= British Muslim Awards =

Annual award ceremony

- Awarded for: Success and achievements of British Muslims
- Sponsored by: Al Rayan Bank
- Location: England
- Country: United Kingdom
- Presented by: Oceanic Consulting
- First award: 2013
- Website: http://www.thediversityawards.info/britishmuslim/

The British Muslim Awards are an annual award ceremony that honours the success and achievements of British Muslim individuals, groups and businesses. It was established in 2013.

== Overview ==
The British Muslim Awards was founded by Oceanic Consulting. The event honours the success, achievements and contribution of Britain's Muslim individuals, groups and businesses and highlights the significant role Muslims play in contributing to a better Great Britain.

It recognises the achievements of Muslim men and women at the forefront of their communities and industries celebrating the success of individuals, community groups and businesses, highlighting their achievements and recognising various aspects of British society including business, charity, sport, arts, and culture.

== 2013 event ==
From October 2012, nominations were encouraged through social media. Following 10,000 nominations nationally, the finalists for the inaugural British Muslim Awards were announced.

The first national British Muslim Awards event took place on 29 January 2013 at the Sheridan Suite in Manchester. The awards were presented by Tasmina Ahmed Sheikh of Hamilton Burns Solicitors and co-hosted by entrepreneur and philanthropist Zulfi Hussain. The Islamic Bank of Britain was the headline sponsor for the event. The awards ceremony was attended by 600 people.

The event also raised money for Mosaic, the largest multi-cause charitable enterprise in the United Kingdom. Founded by Prince Charles in 2007, Mosaic's mentoring programmes create opportunities for young people growing up in the most deprived communities.

=== Nominees and winners ===
Muslim in the Community	Arts & Culture Awareness
Muslim Scout Fellowship: Zahid Hussain; Dr Hany El-Banna (The Humanitarian Forum); ZR Foundation; Akhtar Mansoor (Blackbur)	Aaqil Ahmed (BBC): Adil Ray (Writer and actor of Citizen Khan); Enam Ali (of The British Curry Awards); Imran Akram (of Brit Writers); British Muslim Heritage Centre
Young Achiever (presented by Grafx Media)	Charity of the Year (presented by Sheridan Suite)
Mamuna Farooq, of DJM Solicitors: Omar Ali (of Federation of Student Islamic Societies); Imran Hakim (of i-teddy); Rehana Azib (of 2 Temple Gardens); Sajda Mughal (Jan Trust)	Islamic Relief: Oxfam; Mosaic; Muslim Hands; Tell Mama
Responsible Media of the Year (sponsored by Oceanic Media Consulting)	Religious Advocate of the Year (sponsored by National Zakat Foundation)
BBC Radio 5 Live: Islam Channel; The Independent; Peace TV; Al Jazeera	Sheikh Bilal Khan (Dome Advisory): Iman Abdul Jalil Sajid (of Brighton Islamic Missions); Iman Monawar Hussain (of Oxford Foundation); Shaheen Kauser (of NHS Muslim Chaplain); Ajmal Masroor (of Barefoot Institute)
Muslim Woman of the Year (sponsored by the World Congress of Philanthropists)	Best at Sport (presented by Saffron Events UK)
Haifa Fahoum Al Kaylani (Arab International Women's Forum): Aliya Mohammed (of Race Equality First); Shahien Taj (of Henna Foundation); Shaista Gohir (of Muslim Woman's Network); Baroness Pola Uddin (Parliament)	Mo Farah (Double Gold Olympic Athlete): Rimla Akhtar (of Muslim Woman Sports Foundation); Samir Nasri (Manchester City footballer); Muslim Woman Sports Foundation; Amir Khan (British professional boxer)
Services to Medicine (sponsored by Accounts Management Services)	Services to Media (sponsored by the World Congress of Philanthropists)
Professor Farida Fortune: Mohammed Ali Jawad; Tipu Zahed Aziz; Sir Maqdi Habib Yacoub; Dr Mahdi Mabruk Jibani	Sarwar Ahmed: Saira Khan; Razia Iqbal; Mazher Mahmood; Andleeb Hanif
Services to Education (presented by Mosaic)	Services to Science & Engineering (presented by Mosaic)
Bushra Nasir (Plashet School): Mona Siddiqui (Islamic Assistant Principal for Religious Studies); Baroness Haleh Afshar (Professor and Life Peer in House of Loads); Ahmed Choonara (Network for Black Professionals); Hawa Bibi Laher (Spring Grove School)	Mohamed El-Gomati (University of York): Dr Javed Siddiqui (University of Manchester); Abdulsalam Al-Mayahi; Professor Adel Sharif (University of Surrey); Andy Miah (University of the West of Scotland)
Services to Law (sponsored by Accounts Management Services)	Services to Creativity & Technology (sponsored by Islamic Bank of Britain)
Nazir Afzal (CCPS): Imran Khan (Imran Khan & Partners); Aamer Anwar (Aamer Anwar & Co); Naema Choudry (Eversheds); Tahir Khan (Barrister at Law at Broadway House Chambers)	Uzma Hassan (Producer, The Infidel): Sir Hossein Yassaie (of Imagination Technologies); Shaf Rasul (of Enet Distribution); Adeem Younis (of SingleMuslim.com); Ajaz Ahmed (of AKQA)
Civil Servant of the Year (presented by Asian Image)	Services to Finance & Accounts (sponsored by Euro Quality Lambs)
DI Khizra Dhindsa (ACPO): Ishtiaq Hussain (Central Government); Zaheer Ahmad (National Association of Muslim Police); Ruhena Zoarder (Central Government); Admiral Amjad Mazhar Hussain (Royal Navy)	Amin Mawji (Ernest & Young): Sharjill Ahmed (of Bank of London and Middle East); Mahmoud Atalla (of HSBC); Farmida Bi (of Norton Rose Fulbright); Siddiq Musa (of KPMG)
Politician of the Year (sponsored by Oceanic Consulting)	Businesswoman of the Year (sponsored by Tahira Foods)
Anas Sarwar MP: Baroness Sayeeda Warsi; Sadiq Khan MP; Rushanara Ali MP; Yasmin Qureshi MP	Farida Gibbs (Gibbs S3): Perween Warsi (of S&A Foods); Shazia Awan (of Peachy Pink); Nighat Awan (of Shere Group); Farah Ramzan Golant (of All 3 Media)
Businessman of the Year (sponsored by Tahira Foods)	Entrepreneur of the Year (sponsored by Islamic Bank of Britain)
Aneel Mussarat (MCR Property): Iqbal Ahmed (Seamark Group); Tariq Usmani (Henley Homes); Toukar Suleyman (Low Profile Holdings); Akmal and Afzal Khushi (Trespass)	James Caan: Azeem Ibrahim; Shahid Sheikh; Farnaz Khan; Wasfi Kani
Business of the Year (sponsored by Islamic Bank of Britain)	Spirit of Britain (sponsored by Euro Quality Lambs)
99p Stores: Euro Garages; Bestway Cash & Carry; Manchester City Football Club; S&A Foods	Team Khan: Muslim Jewish Foundation Forum of Greater Manchester

== 2014 event ==
On 14 January 2014, the finalists were announced. The second awards event was held on 31 January 2014 at the Salford City Stadium. The awards were presented by Tasmina Ahmed-Sheikh OBE of Hamilton Burns WS and welcomed over 400 attendees.

The event also raised money for The Well Foundation. Set up in 2008, The Well Foundation aims to raise money to build wells, install hand pumps and establish health and sanitation programs to provide accessible clean water to the stricken regions of the world.

=== Nominees and winners ===
Muslim in the Community (presented by Shazana Raja, Marketing Director at AsiansUK)	Arts & Culture Awareness (sponsored by The British Indian Awards and presented by Amit Arora, Business Development Director)
Colours of Islam: Bradford Muslim Women's Council; Zeeshan Rehman Foundation; Halal Food Festival; Al Isharah	Abdullah Quilliam Quilliam Society: British Muslim Heritage Centre; Arab British Centre; Exhibition Islam; Aerosol Arabic
Young Achiever (presented by Asian Image)	Charity of the Year (presented by Rizvan Khalid of Euro Quality Lambs)
Rabia Bhatti: Kasim Jameel; Saira Hussain (Hussain Architectural Design); Adil Rashid (Adil Rashid Cricket Academy); Islam Feruz	Muslim Hands: Islamic Relief; Penny Appeal; The Lady Fatemah Charitable Trust; Muslim Aid
Responsible Media of the Year (sponsored by Oceanic Media Consulting and presented by Colin Grant, Director)	Religious Advocate of the Year (sponsored by National Zakat Foundation and presented by Iqbal Nasim, National Manager)
Islam Channel: Al Jazeera; Emel Magazine; Invitation Magazine; Peace TV	Amer Jamil/Ruzwan Mohammed (iSyllabus): Tariq Ramadan; Bilal Khan (Link Laters LLP and Dome Advisory); Ajmal Masroor; Abu Eesa Niamatullah (AlMaghrib Institute)
Noor Inayat Khan Memorial Award for Muslim Woman of the Year (presented by Sophina Ahmed-Daud of The British Muslim Awards)	Best at Sport (presented by Hassan Anwar, Director at Saffron Events UK)
Sughra Ahmed (Islamic Society of Britain): Salma Yaqoob (Yara Consulting); Yvonne Ridley; Faeeza Vaid (Muslim Women's Network UK); Rabiha Hannan (New Horizons)	Haroon Khan: Tahmina Begum; Salma Bi; Nathan Ellington; Saira Tabasum
Dr. Abbas Khan Memorial Award for Services to Medicine (presented by Sara Khan (Sister of Dr. Abbas Khan))	Services to Media (presented by Host Tasmina Ahmed Sheikh OBE)
Seher Ahmad: Mohammed Javad; Aziz Sheikh; Sheraz Daya; Nadia Khalid	Mehdi Hasan: Tasnim Nazeer; Rageh Omaar; Mishal Husain; Shelina Zahra Janmohamed
Services to Education (presented by Sobya Sattar of The Well Foundation)	Services to Science & Engineering (presented by Host Tasmina Ahmed Sheikh OBE)
Nadira Mirza: Tauheedul Islam Girls' High School; Yusuf Seedat (Islamiyah Girls High School); Sara Silvestri; Sadek Hamid	Nessar Ahmed: Salim T S Al- Hassani; Haroon Ahmed; Azra Meadows; Javaid Siddique
Services to Law (presented by Adeel Asghar of AiA Marketing)	Services to Creativity & Technology (presented by Host Tasmina Ahmed Sheikh OBE)
Ifath Nawaz (Chiltern District Council): Forz Khan (Chambers of Khan); Aina Khan (Duncan Lewis Solicitors); Nauman Javid (Farani Javid Taylor); Tahir Khan (Broadway House Chambers)	Faizah Maryam Mustafa (Macmillan): Moneeb Awan; SUNDE Technologies; Nazish Aslam (For Where I Am); Amman Ahmed (Rormix)
Civil Servant of the Year (presented by Lieutenant Colonel Rosie Stone of The British Army)	Services to Finance & Accounts (presented by Mohammed Ahmed and Afruj Choudhury of The Spice City Journal)
Asif Sadiq (City of London Police): Emran Mian (Social Market Foundation); Judge Khurshid Drabu (Ministry of Justice); Asif Anwar Ahmad (Foreign and Commonwealth Office); Suniya Qureshi (DWP)	Siddiq Musa (of KPMG): Farmida Bi (of Norton Rose Fulbright); Tarek el Diwany (1st ethical); Asim Siddiqui (Gatehouse Bank)
Politician of the Year (sponsored by Oceanic Group and presented by Irfan Younis)	Businesswoman of the Year (sponsored by Yasmin Mahmood, Operations Director of Oceanic Consulting)
Yasmin Qureshi MP: Sadiq Khan MP; Sajid Javid MP; Mohammad Asghar AM; Shabana Mahmood MP	Salma Chaudry (The Halal Cosmetics Company): Uzma Yakoob (Sculpt Beauty); Ruzwana Bashir (Peek.com); Tab Ahmed (Employ-ability); Imtaz Khaliq (Bespoke Design and Couture Tailoring)
Businessman of the Year (sponsored by Islamic Bank of Britain and presented by Maisam Fazal, head of Commercial Sales)	Entrepreneur of the Year (sponsored by Islamic Bank of Britain and presented by Zegum Hussain, Senior Branch Manager)
Sutterwala Brothers (TRS): Mohammed Bin Issa Al Jaber (MBI International); Touker Suleyman (Hawes and Curtis); Afzal and Akmal Khushi (Trespass); Mohammed Khalid (Chicken Cottage)	Taz and Umer Sheikh (Gamucci): Faraz Khan (SEED Ventures); Ghias El Yafi (Tahira); Tahir and Zuber Mohsan (Supanet Limited); James Caan
Business of the Year (sponsored by Islamic Bank of Britain and presented by Imran Pasha, Head of Sales)	Spirit of Britain (presented by Faiza Baqir of The Well Foundation)
Asons Solicitors: Quiz; Euro Garages; Accrol; Chunky Chicken	Muslim Jewish Forum: Quilliam Foundation; Christian Muslim Forum

== 2015 event ==
On 4 December 2014, the finalists were announced for 22 awards.

On 27 January 2015, the third annual awards event presented by Al Rayan Bank (formerly known as Islamic Bank of Britain) was held at the Chateau Impney Hotel in Worcestershire. Over 400 people attended the ceremony, which was presented by award-winning TV chef, Ajmal Mushtaq. The event raised £1500 for The Well Foundation.

=== Nominees and winners ===
Muslim in the Community	Arts & Culture Awareness
Ali Khan (Roshni): Muslim Women's Network; Mile End Community Project; Noori Bibi (Jawaab); Muslim Women's Council (Bradford); Better Community Business Network	Shahida Rahman (Perfect Publishers): Tabinda Kauser Ishaq (London College of Fashion); Samuir Rahman (House of Calligraphy); Abdullah Shariff (Spoken Word Poet, Yarlet); Milton Keynes Islamic Arts & Culture; SISTERS Magazine; Waseem M Aslam
Young Achiever	Charity of the Year
Enaam Ahmed (Enaam Motor Sport): Aysha Boshor (Aysha Academy Trust); Ayan Qureshi (Youngest Microsoft Certified Professional); Zain Awan (Creative Consultant); Shahid Khan (Naughty Boy); Hamzah Hafesji (Islamic Help); Sara Khan (Inspire)	Orphans in Need: Penny Appeal; Lady Fatimah Trust; Islamic Relief; Nour Domestic Violence; Human Appeal; Islamic Help
Responsible Media of the Year	Religious Advocate of the Year
British Muslim TV: The Muslim News; Noor TV; Islam Channel; Peace TV; Channel 4; The Huffington Post	Imam Asim Hafiz (UK Ministry of Defence): Hamza Andreas Tzortzis; Qari Mohammed Asim (Leeds Makkah Mosque); Imam Shahid Raza (Leicester Central Mosque); Molana Rayan Mahmud (Iqra TV); Imam Irfan Chisti (Light of Islam Academy); Qari Noman Yousef (Harem Academy)
Noor Inayat Khan Memorial Award for Muslim Woman of the Year	Best at Sport
Rimla Akhtar: Amirah Foundation; Amenakin; Myira Khan; Baroness Sayeeda Warsi; Mehmuda Mian	Samera Ashraf: Qasim Niaz; Ambreen Sadiq; Moeen Ali; Haseeb Hameed; Ateeq Javid; Ali Al-Habsi
Dr. Abbas Khan Memorial Award for Services to Medicine	Services to Media
Dr Nadia Khalid: Professor Alimudin Zumla; Dr Syed Nayyer Abidi; Dr Mohammad Saqib Anwar; Dean Dentists; Dr Mohammed Jawad; Professor Aziz Sheik	Mishal Husain (BBC): Yasmin Khatun (Islam Channel); Sameena Ali-Khan (ITV Central); Noreen Khan (BBC Asian Network); Faisal Islam (Sky); Nina Hossain (ITV); Rageh Omaar (ITV)
Services to Education	Services to Science & Engineering
Sofina Aktar Motin Islam (Stanton Bridge): Al Isharah; Shaykh Abdal Hakim Murad Dean (Cambridge Muslim College); Shahed Ahmed Battiwala (Elmhurst Primary); Zaidah Ahmed (Rotherham Borough Council); Professor Iram Siraj (University of London); Ashfaq Chowdhury (Association of Muslim Schools)	Farid Khan: Hamid Ghafur Mughal; Jawed Siddiqui; Saeed Vaseghi; Muslim Engineers Network; Ehsan Masood; Zaha Hadid
Services to Law	Services Creativity & Technology
Bilkis Mahmood (Blackstone Law): Tariq Sadiq (St Philips Chambers); Forz Khan (The Chambers of F Khan); Atif Hanif (Allen & Overy); Farmida Bi (Norton Rose Fulbright); Badr Al-Hasan (Dome Advisory); Shehneela Ahmed (Platinum FA)	Muslim & Single: Air 21; Remit One; Book Friends Forever; Hussain Architectural Design; Uzma Asghar (Success Coach & Trainer); Sabirul Islam (Inspire1million)
Civil/Third Sector Servant of the Year	Services to Finance & Accounting
Saleh Saeed (DEC): Yasmin Shabir (HMRC); Salim Sidat (Blackburn Council); Hasan Bakhshi (Nesta); Syed Mizan Rahman (Cabinet Office); Salim Mitha (HMRC); Wasim Mir (Foreign and Commonwealth Office)	Islamic Finance Council: Moorad Choudhry (RBS); Nadeem Ahmed (Hentons); Mohammed Khan (PWC); Gaffar Khalid; Faizal Karbani (Simply Sharia); Mohamed Iqbal Asaria (Afkar Consulting Ltd)
Politician of the Year	Businesswoman of the Year
Sajid Javid MP: Mohammad Asghar AM; Khalid Mahmood; Yasmin Qureshi MP; Sadiq Khan MP; Sajjad Karim MEP; Amjad Bashir MEP	Henna Riaz (360 Royalty Audit): Farzana Baduel (Curzon PR); Nabila Sadiq (Marlin Hawk); Pinky Lilani (Spice Magic); Shaheen Uni (Mrs Unis); Ruzwana Bashir (Peek.com); Saira Khan
Businessman of the Year	Entrepreneur of the Year
Farouq Sheikh (CareTech Holdings Plc): Asif Aziz (Criterion Capital); Iqbal Ahmed (Seamark Group); Aref Karim (Quality Capital Management); Saleem Asaria (Cambian Group); James Caan; Shahid Azeem (Arcom IT)	Shazia Saleem (IEat Foods): Syed Ahmed (SAVORTEX); Shade 7 Publishing; Noman Khawaja; Ammar Mirza (ABC); Zaynab Mirza (ZaynaB)
Business of the Year	Spirit of Britain
Euro Quality Lambs: CK Foods; Tubzee; Quiz Clothing; Karali LTD (Burger King); KCB Bakeries; Haji Baba	Anas Sarwar MP: Mosaic Network; Active Change Foundation; Waqar Azmi (Waterhouse Consulting Group); Shavanah Taj (PCS Wales Secretary); Sughra Ahmed (Islamic Society of Britain); Mirza Waqas Ahmad (Ahmadiyya Muslim Youth)

== 2016 event ==
On 28 January 2016, the fourth annual British Muslim Awards presented by Al Rayan Bank was held at the Holiday Inn Birmingham City Centre. The event was hosted by presenter Inayat Kanji and was a celebration of success, with around 400 guests.

=== Nominees and winners ===
Muslim in the Community	Arts & Culture Awareness
Young Achiever	Charity of the Year
Outstanding Business of the Year	Religious Advocate of the Year
Noor Inayat Khan Memorial Award for Muslim Woman of the Year	Best at Sport
Dr. Abbas Khan Memorial Award for Services to Medicine	Services to Media
Services to Education	Services to Science & Engineering
Services to Law	Services Creativity & Technology
Civil/Third Sector Servant of the Year	Services to Finance & Accounting
Politician of the Year	Businesswoman of the Year
Businessman of the Year	Entrepreneur of the Year
Business of the Year	Spirit of Britain

== 2017 event ==
On 25 January 2017, the fifth annual British Muslim Awards took place where the winners were announced at the Athena Hotel in Leicester. The evening was hosted by the television presenter and broadcaster journalist Samina Kiyani and the presenter, actor and voiceover artist Inayat Kanji. The celebration was welcomed over 400 guests. The awards also raised money for the National Zakat Foundation.

=== Nominees and winners ===
Muslim in the Community	Arts & Culture Awareness
Young Achiever	Charity of the Year
Power Business of the Year	Religious Advocate of the Year
Noor Inayat Khan Memorial Award for Muslim Woman of the Year	Best at Sport
Dr. Abbas Khan Memorial Award for Services to Medicine	Services to Media
Services to Education	Services to Science & Engineering
Services to Law	Services Creativity & Technology
Civil/Third Sector Servant of the Year	Services to Accounting
Politician of the Year	Businesswoman of the Year
Businessman of the Year	Entrepreneur of the Year
Business of the Year	Spirit of Britain
Community Organisation	Diversity Champion of the Year
Rising Star of the Year	Uniform Services of the Year
Family Run Business of the Year

== 2022 ==
Unzela Khan was the recipient of the 2022 British Muslim Award in the Media Achievement of the Year category.

== See also ==
- British Muslims
- List of British Muslims
