= NAMP =

NAMP may refer to:

- National Association of Muslim Police, Islamic organization based in the United Kingdom
- North American Meat Processors Association, a non-profit meat industry group, merged into the North American Meat Institute in 2015
- Institutional Meat Purchase Specifications, sometimes called NAMP, NAMP/IMPS, or IMPS/NAMP
- North American Mycoflora Project, a non-profit citizen-science organization established in 2017, now known as Fungal Diversity Survey (FunDiS)

== See also ==
- NAMPS, a narrowband version of the Advanced Mobile Phone System developed by Bell Labs and Motorola
