= List of Islamic television and radio stations in the United Kingdom =

The Ahmadiyya television channel was launched on 1 January 1994 by Muslim Television Ahmadiyya International (MTA), globally-broadcasting and nonprofit satellite television network. This set the foundation for the Islamic television channels available today. In July 2009, ILM Radio launched, making it the first Islamic radio station to launch nationwide in the UK. ILM Radio returned in Bradford and Leeds on DAB+ Radio with new identity as Marefa Radio. Founder Qamar Zaman (AKA Shabir Qamar)

In United Kingdom, all the channels are available via Sky and Freesat. Some of these channels are also available in the Republic of Ireland. However, Islamic radio stations have been available on a local basis throughout the UK since the 1990s even though these were on a temporary licence for the Islamic holy month of Ramadan.

== Television networks ==
Name	Language(s)	Established	Type	Notes
MTA 1 World	Programming: English, Urdu Translations: Arabic, Bengali, English, French, German, Urdu	1992 as AMP, 1994 as MTA	Ahmadiyya	First Islamic television channel and the first channel launched by the MTA International Network, which used to broadcast programmes in a variety of languages until 2020, the launch of other regional MTA channels, converted from MTA1.
ARY QTV	Urdu	2003	Sunni Islam	Available in Europe via Eutelsat 28A
Islam Channel	English	2004	Sunni Islam	Third Islamic television channel in the UK. Available throughout UK and Western Europe via Eurobird. Available throughout Europe and Middle East via Hotbird 6 and throughout Africa via Eutelsat Sesat and Eutelsat W4.
Noor TV	English, Urdu	2006	Sunni Islam	Programmes approximately 70% Urdu, 20% English and 10% Other. Based on Sufi principles of Sunni Islam.
Velayet	English, Urdu	2007	Shia Islam	Based on Islamic teachings from the family of Muhammad.
Muslim Kids TV	English, Arabic, Bahasa, Urdu	2014	Sunni Islam	An Islamic on-demand web channel with educational, entertaining, and nurturing content.
Madani Channel	English, Urdu, Bangla	2007	Sunni Islam	The channel is operated by Dawat-e-Islami
Peace TV	English	2007	Sunni Islam	Owned by Zakir Naik. First launched as English and Urdu language channel; in 2009, a separate Urdu language channel launched.
Peace TV Urdu	Urdu	2009	Sunni Islam	Owned by Zakir Naik. Urdu version of the English Peace TV channel.
Peace TV Bangla	Bangla	2009	Sunni Islam	Owned by Zakir Naik. Bangla version of the English Peace TV channel.
Hidayat TV	Urdu, English	2009	Shia Islam	
IQRA TV UK	English, Urdu	2009	Sunni Islam	IQRA TV (IQRA Bangla) (including IQRA Bangla) is owned and run by Al-Khair Foundation under the supervision of Imam Qasim. Mainly in English but also runs some Bangali and Urdu programming. Has strong links with Peace Tv and recently hosted the Al-Khair Peace convention jointly in UK. On Sky in the UK and can be received in Europe via Eurobird 1. Islam TV is owned and run by Al-Khair Foundation under the supervision of Imam Qasim.
Ahlebait TV	Urdu, Persian	2009	Shia Islam	
Ahlulbayt TV	English	2010	Shia Islam	
Fadak	English, Arabic, Persian, French	2011	Shia Islam	Started by Sheikh Yasser Al-Habib.
Shia TV Online	Urdu	2014	Shia Islam	Based on Islamic teachings from the family of Muhammad.
Ummah Channel	English, Urdu	2009	Sunni Islam	An Islamic entertainment channel covering all types of Sunni Islamic teachings. The channel closed on 31 July 2017 after apparent financial difficulty.
Madani Channel	English, Urdu	2009	Sunni Islam	Owned by Dawateislami. The channel emphasises the lifestyle of Muhammad.
Takbeer TV	Urdu	2010	Sunni Islam	Owned and run by the Sultan Bahu Trust. Based on Sufi principles of Sunni Islam. Madani channel December 2009 Sunni Islam Owned And Run by Dawateislami. Sky 828.
Paigham TV	Urdu, Pashto	2011	Sunni Islam	
British Muslim TV	English	2014	Sunni Islam	Sunni Islam
iPlus TV	Urdu	2015	iPlus TV India's first official Islamic TV Satellite Channel registered with Ministry of Information & Broadcastingand with a valid uplinking/downlinking permission and approval and is being uplinked from Delhi to Insat 4A @83°E.	Sunni Islam
Eman Channel	English	2015	Sunni Islam	Eman Channel aims to produce high-quality programs; in terms of both production value and Islamic principles; available freely on satellite television, mobile app and online. Eman Channel is a real alternative Islamic channel for Muslims. Eman Channel shows range from studies of the Qur'an to Halal entertainment for Kids.
BNSW TV	Urdu	2016	Ahl al-Hadith	BNSW TV is an Islamic Channel. This Channel Is Based On Islam, Quran And Hadith.
Bethat TV	Urdu	2017	Sunni Islam	This is an educational TV channel.
Muhammadiya TV / Napoleon TV / Al Hira TV / Nasheed TV	English/Urdu	TBA	Sunni Islam	Micro channels broadcasting via Up & Coming TV channel.
Mercy TV	Urdu/English/Many Indian Languages	2020	Shia Islam	Mercy TV promotes authentic teachings of the Holy Qur’an and Sahih Hadith. It intends to teach about Islam, communal harmony, and Universal brotherhood.
