= Al-Khair Foundation =

International Muslim NGO based in the United Kingdom

- Established: 2003; 23 years ago
- Founder: Imam Qasim Rashid Ahmad
- Tax ID no.: 1126808
- Registration no.: 04819971
- Headquarters: 109-119 Cherry Orchard Road Croydon, CR0 6BE, United Kingdom
- CEO: Shuaib Yusaf
- Chairman: Imam Qasim Rashid Ahmad
- Website: alkhair.org

Al-Khair Foundation (AKF) is an international Muslim aid organisation based in the United Kingdom and Turkey. It was established in 2003, and aims to deliver aid to the poor and vulnerable, as well as education for the Muslim community. It specialises in humanitarian support, international development, emergency aid and disaster relief.

== History ==
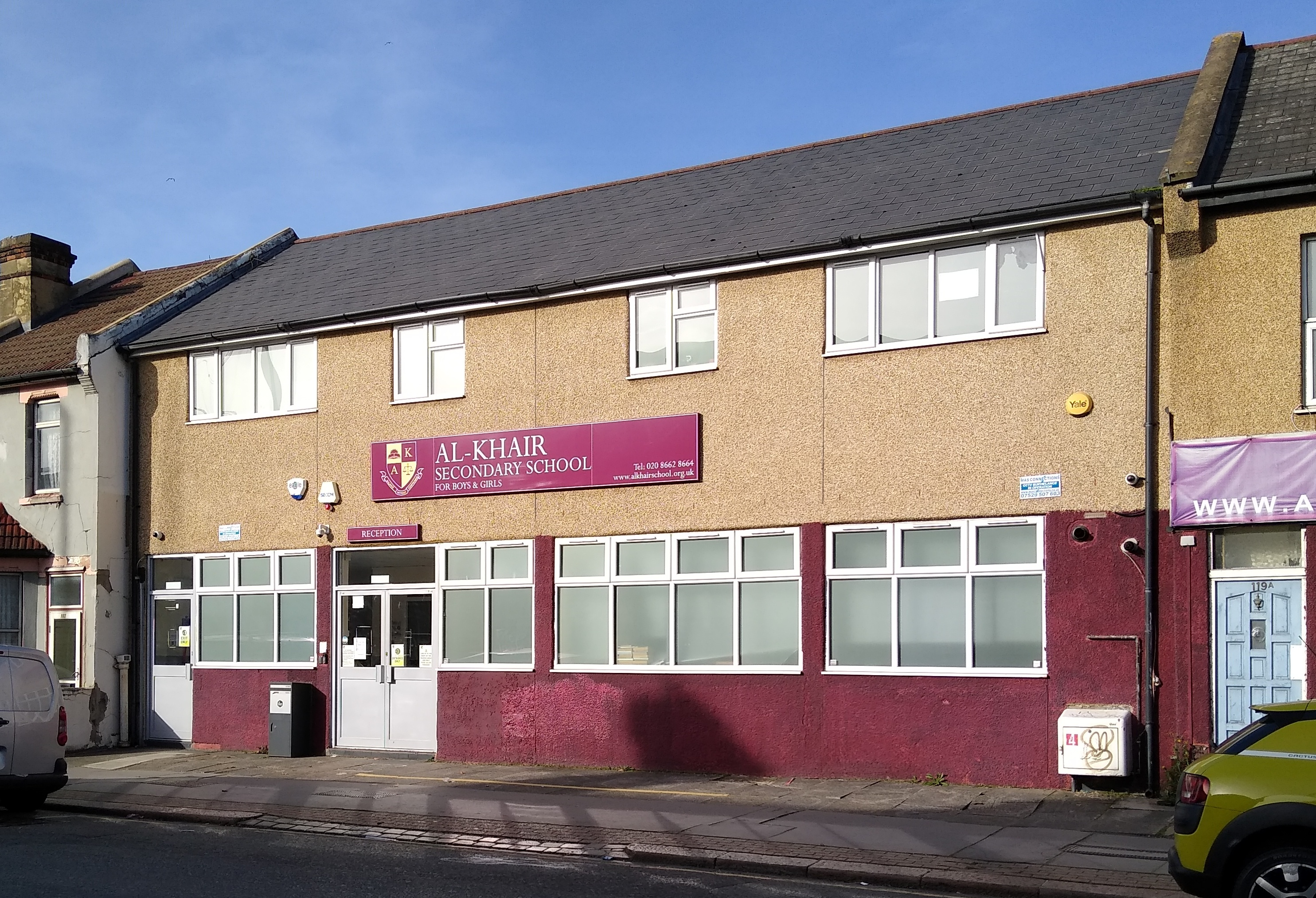
Al-Khair Secondary School

The name of the foundation translates as ‘goodness’ in Arabic. The AKF began as an Islamic school in Croydon in 2003, evolving into a service organisation focusing on education and charity work in the UK.

Qasim Ahmad founded the AKF School, which began in 2003 with five pupils. The sports hall was previously a converted warehouse and the school itself was previously an office. By 2013, the school grew into a primary and secondary school with over 350 pupils. This led to AKF building schools overseas. Later, AKF launched their water aid, medical aid, and livelihood programmes.

In 2005, AKF launched their first relief venture to provide emergency aid during the Kashmir earthquake. AKF's relief teams provided survivors with medicine, food, shelter kits and moral support.

In 2007, AKF established their first shelter in Kashmir, and two years later AKF bought IQRA TV, a free-to-air channel available on Sky TV. IQRA TV's educational Islamic-based programmes including 'Live with IQ', 'IQRA with IQRA', and 'Questions and Answers'.

In 2010, AKF was a founding member of the Muslim Charities Forum.

AKF has supported the victims of many earthquakes, including the Haiti earthquake and Pakistan floods of 2010, the horn of Africa famine relief, and the Japan earthquake of 2011. Their work in Haiti was recognised by the United Nations in 2010, and they were the only UK Muslim charity working with survivors on the ground in the Japan earthquake of 2011.

In 2012, AKF announced their first official partnership with the Malaysian Red Crescent.

In July 2015, AKF partnered with UNRWA to facilitate education in the Gaza Strip.

In 2020, The Times published allegations by Notis Mitarachi, Greek Minister for Migration, that the foundation had colluded with human traffickers. The foundation brought legal action against the Times and the newspaper subsequently published a full apology.

In 2023, Matthew Levitt alleged in U.S. Senate Committee on Banking testimony that the foundation had set up pro-Hamas crowdfunding websites.

In July 2024, an Israel Defense Forces strike in Gaza killed Hossam Mansour, who served as a director for AKF. In March 2025, the foundation announced that an Israeli drone strike had killed several of their volunteer aid workers and two independent journalists in Gaza.

=== Sustainable development & aid ===
AKF provides relief to help those affected or displaced by disasters and conflict through the use of sustainable development programmes, ranging from livelihood projects to long-term water aid projects. Notable work by AKF includes work to prevent future floods in Pakistan using infrastructure relief projects.

=== Awareness raising ===
Al-Khair Schools aim to educate and encourage children to give back to their communities.

=== Partnerships ===
AKF works with more than 30 partners, including the Qatar Red Crescent, UNRWA, Kenya Red Cross, United Muslim Relief, UNHCR, Global One, Afghan Aid, Tayyab trust, Christian Aid, UMR and Islamic Help and many more. AKF is also a member of the Coalition of Muslim NGOs and participated in a Christian-Muslim Humanitarian partnerships workshop, hosted by the Lutheran world federation in Jordan in 2013.

=== Advocacy ===
AKF aims to advocate for global issues, which its members believe require more than donations. AKF also aims to promote interfaith dialogue and works to promote tolerance and understanding.

== Key people ==
Qasim Ahmad founded the AKF and serves as its chairman. He is also the CEO of IQRA TV.

Dr Jafer Qureshi a senior consultant psychiatrist based in Birmingham serves as a trustee. He also serves on the board of Muslim Aid Sweden and India.

In April 2015, AKF appointed a new chief executive officer, Saif Ahmad. He was formerly the a CEO of the UK charities Muslim Aid and Islamic Help.

== Locations ==
In the United Kingdom, AKF has offices in London (East Croydon and Bounds Green), Bolton, Glasgow, Sheffield, Leicester and Blackburn.

The foundation also operates in Bangladesh, Somaliland, Kenya, Japan, India, Pakistan, Palestine, Sierra Leone, Albania, Myanmar, Philippines, Afghanistan, Haiti and Chile.
