= Al-Khair School =

Islamic school in London, England, United Kingdom

Coordinates: 51.3794°N 0.0889°W

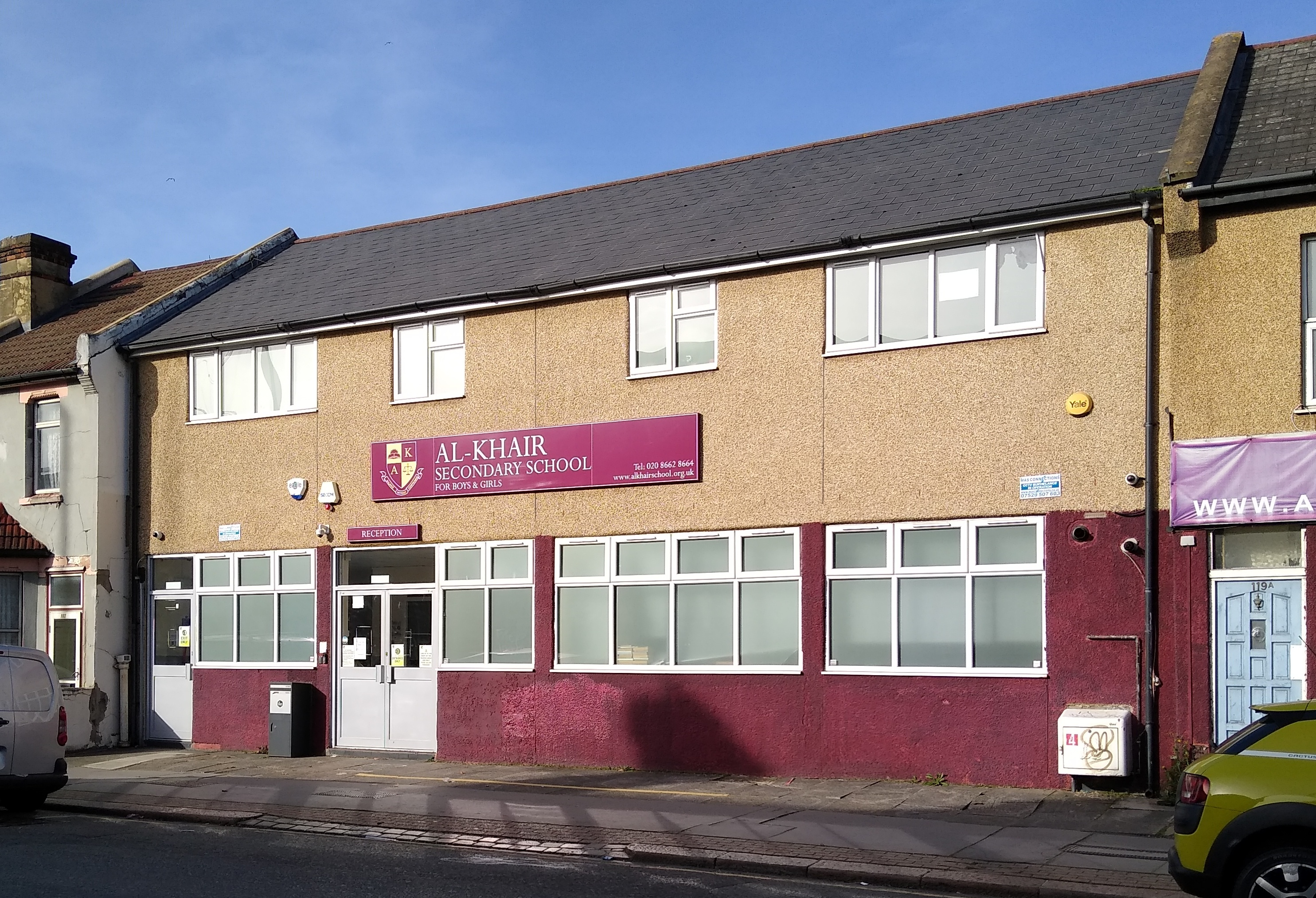
- Iyaad town

Information
- Type: Private school
- Established: 18 August 2003
- Founder: Imam Qasim Rashid Ahmad
- Local authority: LB of Croydon
- Department for Education URN: 134585 Tables
- Gender: Mixed
- Age: 4 to 16
- Enrolment: 430 as of October 2016
- Colours: pink and brown
- Website: https://alkhairschool.org.uk

Al Khair is a primary and secondary school in the heart of East Croydon.

== History ==
The school officially opened to the public in 2003 and was enrolled with only five pupils. The sports hall was a converted warehouse and the school itself was an office. The founder of the school is Imam Qasim Rashid Ahmad. He is also the founder of the Al-Khair Foundation.

In over ten years, the school has evolved into a fully fledged primary and secondary school, with over 350 pupils.
