= Adeem Younis =

English-Pakistani entrepreneur and humanitarian (born 1980)

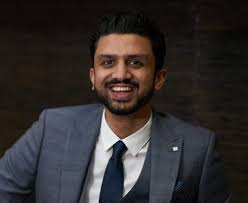
- Born: 17 October 1980 (age 46); Wakefield, West Yorkshire, England
- Education: University of Leeds
- Known for: SingleMuslim.com and Penny Appeal
- Website: adeemyounis.com

Adeem Younis (born 17 October 1980) is an English-Pakistani entrepreneur, philanthropist, and humanitarian. He is best known as founder of digital matrimony platform SingleMuslim.com and international humanitarian charity Penny Appeal.

He is a founding board member of Penny Appeal USA and also helped set up Penny Appeal South Africa, Penny Appeal Canada and Penny Appeal Australia. He is a Founding Circle Member of the British Asian Trust and was listed as one of Yorkshire's leading entrepreneurs by Insider Media in their "42 under 42" list of 2019.

== Early life and education ==
Younis was born to Pakistani parents in Wakefield, West Yorkshire on 17 October 1980. His father died when he was eight years old. He was raised by his mother and grandparents. He attended Outwood Grange School and went on to study at Wakefield College where he maintained a close relationship upon graduation. The college nominated him for an Association of Colleges Gold Award for his achievements as an outstanding alumnus of the school.

In late 2018, Younis announced that the charity he founded, Penny Appeal, had bought the Thornes Park campus in which he had studied and were transforming it into a new international headquarters for the charity.

He received his bachelor's in Graphic Designing from the University of Leeds.

Younis funded his studies by founding his first business, GoWebPrint, at the age of 17 above the fast food shop where he worked part-time. He went on to help set up a restaurant in Wakefield, which was renowned for its chocolate curry, before focusing his efforts on his humanitarian work and business.

== Career ==
Younis is the founder and CEO of world's largest Muslim digital matrimony platform, SingleMuslim.com. It has over 2 million users registered with market penetration estimated at 52% of all British Muslims aged between 16 and 60. The website was launched on 1 August 2000, and its headquarters is in Wakefield, West Yorkshire, England. As SingleMuslim.com's founder, Younis has helped facilitate over 100,000 Muslim marriages.

Younis has said of his platform: "We make it very clear this is for people who are serious about getting married, and it is not some 'meet up' service... We’re not just facilitating marriages. It's a really liberating service, we help people and it’s a cornerstone to a society. Religion is bringing people together."

Younis’ memoir, Small Change, Big Difference: The Penny Appeal Story was published on 12 April 2021 by Can of Worms Press.

== Charitable activities ==
=== Penny Appeal ===
In 2009, Younis founded Penny Appeal, a charitable organization working in over 52 countries and providing essential aid and welfare to those in the UK. It builds wells, orphan homes, and schools, and provides life-saving medical relief, nourishing meals and more. In the UK, Penny Appeal runs a fostering and adoption agency, funds a number of soup kitchens and food banks and supports refugee settlement. The two times Guinness World Records holding charity raised just over £100,000 in 2012. In 2017, Penny Appeal's total turnover had exceeded over £22 million. The organisation has launched a sister domestic relief programme, demonstrating their commitment to begin charity at home. The charity has helped an estimated 20 million individuals and raised over £60 million for good causes. Penny Appeal has been recognized as largest provider of orphan care in The Gambia by its president. The charity has enlisted a number of high-profile ambassadors including Amir Khan and Cat Stevens.

Younis ran the London Marathon in aid of Penny Appeal's Thirst Relief campaign in 2017, 2018 and 2019, raising tens of thousands of pounds in the process. In 2019, in celebration of the charity's ten years of operation, Younis appointed the first ever charity ‘Kid’ CEO, Shakira Rahman. Younis met Rahman at Penny Appeal's Great Muslim Pantomime tour, was inspired by her "can-do" attitude and created a special role for her to contribute to the charity from the perspective of a child.

Penny Appeal has been lauded for handling challenges to the leadership and governance of the organisation. Former employees have described the organisation as being "the most unethical and Immoral organisation you will find". The charity was shocked following allegations of abuse in one of their partner organisations working in the Gambia . Penny Appeal has since instituted a range of organisational enhancements, however has confirmed that the Government of Gambia has dropped any case related to potential allegations.

=== Penny Ventures ===
Younis is director and co-founder of Penny Ventures, which works in partnership with the James Caan Foundation. Caan and Younis co-created Penny Ventures as an investment fund that supports budding entrepreneurs launch and grow new businesses.

=== SalaamGiving ===
Created in partnership with JustGiving, SalaamGiving is an online crowdfunding platform tailored for Muslim communities. The platform was co-created by Younis and launched in 2018.

== Suspension from Penny Appeal ==
In September 2019, Younis was suspended from charity Penny Appeal after "serious issues" were brought to the attention of the Chief Executive and trustees. In July 2020, Younis was reinstated in his board role within the charity after an investigation into allegations of misconduct found no wrongdoing.

== Awards and nominations ==
Younis was awarded Young Director of the Year by Yorkshire's Institute of Directors. He was made an Ambassador by The Yorkshire Society owing to his success as an entrepreneur and awarded Entrepreneur of the Year at the Asian Business Awards 2017. Also in 2017, Younis was decorated as the Natwest ‘Entrepreneur for Good’ in the 2017 Natwest Great Entrepreneurship Awards. In 2018 he received Entrepreneur of the Year award at British Muslim Awards. In the same year he received the ‘Charity Chair of the Year’ Award at the Third Sector Excellence Awards. In 2019, Younis was awarded the 'Ummul Mu’minin Khadijah' Award for Excellence in Enterprise at the Muslim News Awards.
