= UMR =

UMR may stand for:

- Underground Media Revolution, a music e-zine in Pakistan
- Uninitialized Memory Reads
- University of Missouri–Rolla, former name of the Missouri University of Science and Technology
- University of Minnesota Rochester
- Unreal Media Ripper - tool for extracting media (sounds and music) from games made in the unreal system
- Upper Mississippi River
- Ursula Maier-Rabler
- United Muslim Relief
- Unité mixte de recherche, a French administrative entity created between a research center located in a public university and a French Scientific and Technical Research Establishment (Établissement public à caractère scientifique et technologique) like CNRS or INRAE
- UMR which is subsidiary and third party administrator for United Healthcare Services Incorporated, a medical insurance provider.
- Universal Mandatory Reporting, laws requiring all adults to act as mandated reporters of child abuse
- Universal Music Russia
- United Medical Resources, a subsidiary of UnitedHealthcare
- Unique Market Reference, a type of unique ID used in the insurance industry

and also :

- RAAF Base Woomera, IATA airport code "UMR"
