= The Humanitarian Forum =

The Humanitarian Forum is an international network of NGOs, bringing together both Muslim and Western charities.

The Humanitarian Forum was founded by Dr Hany El-Banna in 2005 and is registered in UK as a charity.

The goal of the Humanitarian Forum is to help create a conducive, unbiased and safe environment for the implementation of technically sound and principled humanitarian action by;

- providing a platform for dialogue,

- promoting mutual understanding,

- supporting capacity building and development of NGOs and charities,

- advocating for a legal framework for greater transparency and accountability,

- promoting humanitarian principles and standards and

- improving communication and co-operation

Dr. Hany El Banna, founder of Islamic Relief and chairman of the Muslim Charities Forum, is the president of The Humanitarian Forum.
