= Alan Rockefeller =

American mycologist and fungi photographer

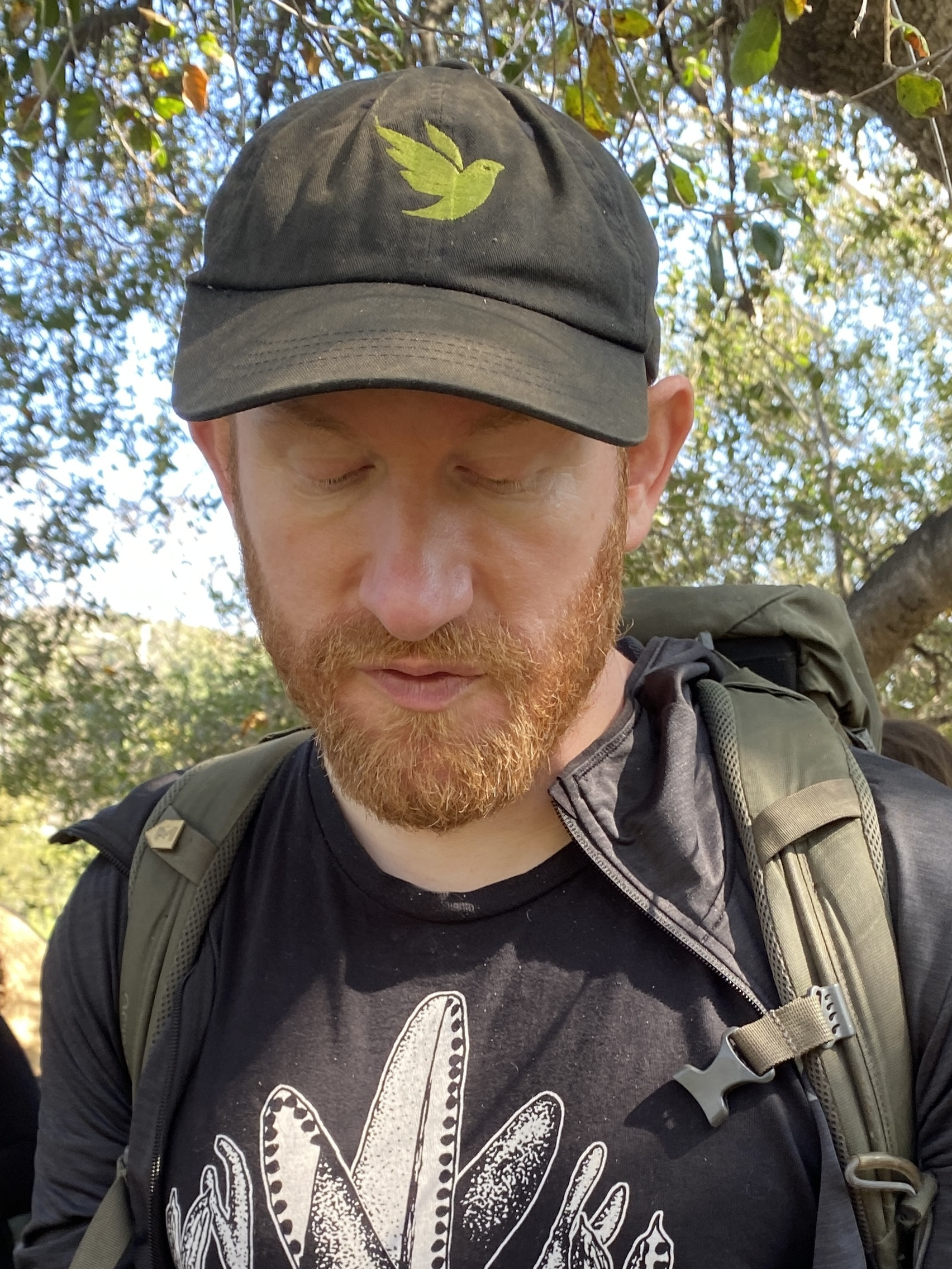
Alan Rockefeller leads a mushroom walk at Eaton Canyon in Los Angeles County, California

Alan Rockefeller (born c. 1980) is an American mycologist who specializes in fungi photography, microscopy, DNA barcoding, and taxonomy. National Geographic described Rockefeller as "one of the most well-known mycologists studying psilocybe species", citing his memorization of Latin names and his extensive knowledge of mushrooms from the West Coast. Rockefeller, an expert in collection and classification of psilocybin and muscimol mushrooms, has used phylogenetic and microscopic analysis to identify several species not previously described.

Rockefeller participates in several citizen science projects by identifying fungi on iNaturalist, Mushroom Observer, and Facebook, as well as teaching mushroom photography classes. Rockefeller's iNaturalist images are released under a Creative Commons license, allowing their use as photo illustrations for news articles and sites like Wikipedia. Rockefeller asserts that fungi photography is valuable not just for scientific documentation but "to get people excited about nature." Rockefeller is self-taught, and the San Francisco Chronicle once described him as a "remarkably dedicated volunteer". Mycology is an underfunded field that relies more than many scientific disciplines on independent naturalists for taxonomic extensions.

Rockefeller worked professionally in information security but "the son of two science teachers...started studying mushrooms in 2001 and has since traveled around the world to find and classify them. Since 2007, he has made annual visits to Mexico and has photographed more than 1,000 fungi species that grow there." His explorations of Mexican cloud forests have included studies of night-fruiting, bioluminescent and fluorescent mushrooms. Since 2023, Rockefeller and Mandie Quark, in cooperation with the indigenous Sacha-Wasi people, have been working to catalog Ecuadorian fungi species.

Rockefeller was one of the taxonomists who first described Psilocybe allenii and he "recently co-authored a 2020 publication characterizing five Psilocybe species." He also moderates Shroomery.org, a discussion forum for enthusiasts and home cultivators of psychedelic mushrooms, which remain illegal in many/most jurisdictions.

== See also ==
- Commons:Category:Photographs by Alan Rockefeller
