= Time UK =

Time UK may refer to:

- Time UK, a manufacturer of PCs sold by Granville Technology Group
- Time UK (band), a 1980s rock band
- Time in the United Kingdom
