= Fundis =

Fundis most often refers to:

- Fundi (politics) - fundis - plural form of short term for "fundamentalists" in some political circles.
- Fungal Diversity Survey, a 501(c)3 non-profit also known as FunDiS, formerly North American Mycoflora Project.
