= Tahir Mohsan =

British businessperson

Tahir Mohammed Mohsan (born 1971) is a British businessperson who founded Time Computers in 1987, Supanet, Tpad and 6G Internet. He comes from a family of Pakistani origin, and has been one of the richest young Britons.

== Early life and career ==
Mohsan was born in June 1971 in Blackburn and is one of five brothers. In 1987, at the age of 16, he founded Time Computers, which went on to become Britain's largest manufacturer of PCs, with a turnover of over $750 million. He moved to Dubai in 2003, to develop the brand of Time in the Middle East and South East Asia. Time Group continues in the United Kingdom, Middle East and the Far East, supplying computers, notebooks, plasma screens and TFT screens around the world. In January 2002, he acquired Tiny Computers.

In 1996, he became a non executive director of the East Lancashire Training & Enterprise Council.

Mohsan also owns Internet service provider Supanet, currently under the control of his brother Zuber Mohsan who is the company's managing director the Mohsans family investment companies have interests in the IT and property industries across Europe, the Middle East and Asia. These range from hardware manufacturing and sales to Internet services, software development and Voice over IP technology company Tpad.

In 1999, he was asked to become a non executive director of the newly founded University for Industry, chaired by Lord Dearing. In the same year, he had bestowed on him an Honorary Fellowship, from the University of Lancashire, for services to industry.

Also in 2000, he was asked by the Chairman of the East Lancashire Training and Enterprise Councils and Business Link to set up a business support agency for integrating the ethnic businesses of Lancashire into the main population. The results was the Asian Business Federation, which was launched in June 2000. As part of Enterprise4All, the ABF covers the whole North West region and continues to thrive under the chairmanship of Mohsan.

He was approached by the group of Hilton Hotels, to become an independent co opted trustee. In May 2006, Mohsan set up the VoIP telephony company Tpad, which specialises in providing business telephone systems and solutions to businesses, the public sector and corporates around the world. Tpad has its headquarters in Jersey, with service centres and presence in the UAE, India, Hong Kong, United States, United Kingdom and Canada.

== Awards and recognition ==
In January 2014, Mohsan was nominated for the Entrepreneur of the Year Award, at the British Muslim Awards.
