= Muslim Charities Forum =

Islamic organization based in the United Kingdom

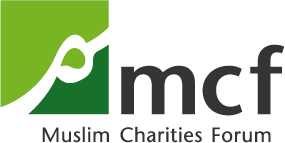
- Founded: 2008
- Founder: Hany El-Banna
- Type: Charity
- Purpose: Advocacy, Capacity Building, Research, Partnership Building, Promotion of Humanitarian Principles and Standards
- Headquarters: London, UK
- Key people: CEO: Fadi Itani
- Income: £136,500 (2018)
- Website: www.muslimcharitiesforum.org.uk

The Muslim Charities Forum (MCF) is an umbrella organisation for UK based Muslim-led charities whose primary goal is to provide humanitarian aid and assistance to the poorest and most vulnerable people around the world. It is also an associate member of British Overseas NGOs for Development (Bond), the UK membership body for non-government organisations and a member of National Council for Voluntary Organisations (NCVO), an organisation with 11,000 members that champions the voluntary sector and volunteering.

The Chairman of the Board of Trustees of the Muslim Charities Forum is Moazzam Malik.

Fadi Itani is the Chief Executive.

The organisation faced hostile media reporting after one of its members alleged ties to political and non charitable entities in an article in the Telegraph. Days later however, the Telegraph made a correction in its print edition. The Charity Commission had previously confirmed in 2009 that the alleged connections of an MCF member to those entities were unfounded.

== Background ==
Muslim Charities Forum was founded by the initiative of Hany El Banna and was registered in the United Kingdom as a charity in November 2008.

Its members include UK based international Muslim-led NGOs, including African Development Trust Human Appeal, Human Relief Foundation, Islamic Help, Islamic Relief UK, Muslim Charity, and Muslim Hands.

== Activities ==
The Muslim Charities Forum helps members to provide better services and raise awareness of the work members are doing abroad. It aims to improve British Muslim charities' contribution to international development by promoting the exchange of experience, ideas and information amongst members, between networks of NGOs in the UK and internationally, with governments, and other bodies with an interest in international development.

On 4 November 2009, Muslim Charities Forum organised a workshop on zakat, or giving alms, one of the Five Pillars of Islam. The focus of the workshop was to find a common view for the understanding of zakat between several organisations working in relief and international development. The workshop concluded with a consensus that further sessions were needed with scholars and delegates on the concept of zakat and to provide a general narrative on the general understanding of zakat and other charitable giving and its uses.

On 10 December 2009, Muslim Charities Forum organised a workshop on institutional funding and partnerships. The aim of the workshop was firstly to identify opportunities to build stronger relationships between institutional donors and Muslim-led NGOs, and secondly, to promote partnerships both between Muslim-led NGOs and other types of organisations. The event was highly successful and very well attended, with participants from both Muslim and non-Muslim organisations, including the Disasters Emergency Committee (DEC), Bond, Muslim Hands, Euclid Network, Islamic Relief, DFID, CAFOD, and Oxfam GB.

On 22 January 2011, the Trustees of Muslim Charities Forum met with Prime Minister of Pakistan Yusuf Raza Gilani. The Prime Minister said that it was heartening to note that the Islamic charitable and humanitarian organisations are performing well to serve the cause of humanity in different parts of the world. He also lauded the contribution of representatives of the Muslim community in UK and elsewhere both for their community as well as for the country they are living in. The charitable organisations, he added, serve as a bridge between the country they are living in and the country of their origin.

On 9 December 2014, El-Banna told MPs and peers scrutinising the draft Protection of Charities Bill that anti-terror legislation could make it impossible to deliver overseas aid to certain locations.

On 5 March 2015, the Overseas Development Institute, in a report compiled with support from Muslim Charities Forum, argued that counter-terrorism legislation is making banks increasingly reluctant to deal with charities working in conflict zones, particularly in Muslim countries, and without government action their access to funds could dry up.

The Government announced in July 2016 that Muslim Charities Forum, along with other third sector organisation BOND, were to be part of a Treasury working group that would look into the effects of counter-terrorism legislation on humanitarian organisations.

== Misunderstanding ==
The organisation has received £110,169 from the UK's Department for Communities and Local Government, and was scheduled to receive a further £140,000 under the Faith Minorities Action Project, an initiative aimed at encouraging integration by promoting inter-faith work, improving the role of women in faith, reducing youth crime, and offering child protection training. This was withdrawn after a piece in the Telegraph alleged that an MCF member had links to extremist organisations. MCF denied this and released a statement. In a written statement to Parliament, the Secretary of State for Communities and Local Government alleged that the “Muslim Charities Forum has failed to reassure us that they have robust measures in place to investigate and challenge their members”. The organisation responded that they were "unfounded allegations" and the role of MCF is not a regulator but rather a good practice aggregator.
