= Mosaic Network =

British charity initiative

The Mosaic Network is a charitable initiative founded by Charles, Prince of Wales in 2007 as part of 'The Prince's Programmes' at his charity "Business in the Community". The catalyst was a memorandum from The Prince of Wales to Julia Cleverdon, who was the chief executive officer of BITC, and John O'Brien MBE, who was the director of personal programmes. Although it sat well outside the normal focus of BITC, Cleverdon gave O'Brien a free remit to see what he could create. The initiative very quickly became formed a multiple set of initiatives which included, The Mosaic Schools Network, chaired by Princess Badiya bint El Hassan of Jordon, The Mosaic Speakers Bureau with individuals including Pinky Lilani, Asad Ahmad and many others. It also consisted of a media network launched at Channel 4.

The name Mosaic was settled upon between Cleverdon and O'Brien in a meeting at BITC, where, after approval via Clarence House from The Prince of Wales, this was presented to initial supporters. O'Brien also engaged the Marketing company M&C Saatchi, to create an engaging identity and succinct message and identity. The original logo was a mosaic type form and the lasting message "The Power of Positive Thinking" was crafted. This message was particularly apposite at this time, when so much negative thinking was pertaining to those from a Muslim background.

The Original Funders of the initiative were identified by O'Brien through his personal networks and invited to meet with the Prince of Wales at Clarence House in 2007. At that meeting Rumi Verjee (now Lord Verjee); Naguib Kheraj a senior Banker; Malik Karim, founder of Fenchurch Advisory Partners and Khawar Mann of SX2 Ventures agreed to follow up with O'Brien and their original donations initiated a pilot project in the London Borough of Tower Hamlets. The programme, specifically crafted by O'Brien & Mann proved so successful that with subsequent funding from the UK Government, could be rolled out further. The initial uk Government funding was as a result of O'Brien meeting with Minister Hazel Blears, then Labour Secretary of State at The Department For Communities and Local Government (Now Ministry of Housing, Communities and Local Government). At this time Jonathan Freeman who was later to be seconded into Mosaic, was a senior civil servant in charge of such grant assessments and Muslim community engagement. O'Brien met with Freeman and that started an association which proved useful for the further development of the programme. Some two years later Freeman joined to become O'Brien's deputy running the UK schools programme.

O'Brien is universally credited as being the creative and entrepreneurial force behind the early years of Mosaic with him personally creating the Enterprise Challenge, The Media network, the speakers bureau and then the Mosaic International Leadership School, which he presented to the Prince of Wales as a 60th Birthday present in 2008 at a major gala dinner held at London's Natural History Museum.

Mosaic delivers mentoring programmes in primary and secondary schools and in prisons. The mentoring programmes are designed to help those from disadvantaged communities to realise their potential with the support of volunteer mentors. Mosaic operates in five regions of the UK: London, North West, South East, West Midlands and Yorkshire. In 2010 O'Brien left Business in the Community, to become a private representative of some of The Prince of Wales's interests, including many of the Mosaic connections on amongst other things The Prince's Pakistan Flood Recovery Initiative in 2011. This combined Mosaic network support with that of The Prince's British Asian Trust with a gala dinner and speech by The Prince of Wales.

On O'Brien's departure, the BITC Prince's Programmes were broken up as a group and the Mosaic was led by the National Director, Jonathan Freeman, formerly a senior UK civil servant. Freeman was awarded a prestigious Muslim News Award in 2016, an award previously declined by O'Brien in 2009. Freeman is credited as having taken the network and activities to a new level of depth, in particular focusing on acquiring accreditation and creating a more formalized programmatic feel. Some initial funders and supporters moved away at this time and the number of component parts of Mosaic were reduced, but the over-arching effect was that the school programme gained increased recognition and achieved many awards.

== Statistics ==
In the academic year 2012/13, Mosaic supported 5,000 young people in 140 schools and other institutions, supported by over 900 volunteers. 83% of UK beneficiaries were drawn from the 20% most deprived areas of the country. Mosaic also operates internationally through its International Leadership Programme and delivery of its Enterprise Challenge competition with local partners in Jordan and Qatar. Mosaic’s International Leadership Programme supports 80 young leaders from 20 countries.

== Accreditation ==
Mosaic’s schools programmes have received independent accreditation through the Approved Provider Standard of the Mentoring & Befriending Foundation. In addition, Mosaic’s programmes have been independently evaluated by Demos, the leading research organisation, which described its programmes as "very well run and both the mentors and mentees reported significant benefits in taking part". In 2013, Mosaic received the Prime Minister's Big Society Award. As stated Mosaic was originally an initiative of Business in the Community (BITC). As such, Mosaic was part of The Prince's Charities.

in 2009 it was the subject of a move from Business in the Community to The Princes Trust, maintaining its connection with The Prince of wales. It is widely recognised that at this time the programme was subsumed and although nominally remains, is seen as being a smaller component of a much larger Princes Trust programme. The international leadership Programme was divided from the UK schools mentoring programme and placed in a then new Princes Trust International.

Mosaic is overseen by a national Advisory Board: Mosaic's Founder Chairman (after O'Brien) was Princess Badiya bint El Hassan of Jordan.

== Apax Mosaic Enterprise Challenge ==
The Apax-Mosaic Enterprise challenge was an innovative computer based game originally developed by O'Brien with subsequent co-chair (post Princess Badiya) Khawar Mann OBE, whose co-chair was Yasmin Waljee OBE, who hosted the challenge finals at law firm Hogan Lovells which she was head of Pro-bono support. It remains a national competition for secondary school students across the UK, designed to develop and encourage their entrepreneurial skills.

== Awards and nominations ==
In January 2015, Mosaic was nominated for the Spirit of Britain award at the British Muslim Awards.
