= Tiny Computers =

British computer manufacturer

Tiny Computers Limited
- Type: Private
- Industry: Computer hardware
- Founded: 1991; 35 years ago
- Defunct: 2005; 21 years ago
- Fate: Administration
- Headquarters: Salfords, Surrey, United Kingdom
- Number of locations: 10+ (United Kingdom)
- Parent: OT Computers (1996-2002) Granville Technology Group (2002-2005)

Tiny Computers Limited was a British computer manufacturer based in Salfords, Surrey, England The company was formed in 1991. In 2002, Tiny Computers was bought by Time Computers, after facing administration.

== History ==
Tiny Computers enjoyed great success during the latter half of the 1990s, having retail units throughout the United Kingdom as well as launching in the United States and the Far East. The company claimed to have sold 400,000 units in 2000 and signed a contract worth £40m with Scottish manufacturer Fullarton Computer Industries in August 2001.

Tiny cited reduced air freight fees and a shorter, more efficient supply chain as their reason for choosing a firm based in the United Kingdom over Asian OEMs who had lower base costs.

== Innovations ==
=== Home theater PC ===
In March 2001, the company released one of the first home theater PCs, called the Takami system. The PC was contained in a flat case with a similar form factor to a VCR, and was intended to be placed under a television rather than at a computer desk as was typical during the 1990s. Bundles including a plasma television and other home cinema equipment were also sold.

Despite its innovative nature, the Takami was not a commercial success, with only 5,000 units being sold during 2001.

One of the opening screens in the Tiny Trainer e learning package

=== Tiny Trainer ===
In 2000, in an attempt to make computing easier for those who had little to no experience with PCs, Tiny commissioned e-learning company VSI Communications Group to create a 'virtual mentor' named Tiny Trainer. An interactive animation ran automatically when the PC first booted up and gave users a brief introduction to computers in general, the Windows operating system as well as Tiny's own online services.

Tiny Trainer was based on the same technology platform as VSI's Mentor interactive help series, and was tightly integrated with a Tiny specific Windows ME version of Mentor that also came bundled on Tiny's computers.

== Sponsorship ==
Tiny sponsored Wimbledon F.C. shirts between 1999 and 2000.
