= Active Change Foundation =

Active Change Community

The Active Change Foundation is a community project based in Walthamstow in east London with a stated aim to "prevent the spread of violent street crime, gang related issues, community tensions & violent extremism in all its forms. The group are known for starting the #notinmyname campaign (from September 2014) that voiced protest at the actions of the Islamic State of Iraq and the Levant and the group's misrepresentation of Islam.

== Awards and nominations ==
In January 2015, Active Change Foundation was nominated for the Spirit of Britain award at the British Muslim Awards.
