= Tahmina Begum =

English football referee (born 1993)

- Born: 1993 (age 32–33); Tower Hamlets, London, England
- Other occupation: PE assistant
Years		Role
2010–present		Referee

Tahmina Begum (Bengali: তাহমিনা বেগম; born 1993) is an English football referee and PE assistant. In 2010, she became the first qualified female referee of Bangladeshi descent in the United Kingdom.

== Education and career ==
In 2010, at the age of 17, Begum was part of a group of 12 that passed a referee course organised by the Bangladesh Football Association (BFA). She became the first qualified female referee of Bangladeshi descent in the UK, she was the only female on the course and had to convince her parents to do the course. Since then she has been officiating in BFA football matches and other local leagues in East London.

Begum is a trained basketball coach. She has achieved the Community Sports Leaders Award (CSLA), which secured her a job as a PE assistant and multi-sports coach at a primary school in Tower Hamlets. She is one of the deputy Young Mayors of Tower Hamlets. She is currently studying at University of Greenwich.

== Awards ==
In October 2010, Begum was awarded the Chelsea Community Sports Award for Football In The Community at the GG2 Leadership and Diversity Awards. In January 2014, she was nominated for the Best at Sport award at the British Muslim Awards.

== Personal life ==
After being selected through the London Organising Committee of the Olympic and Paralympic Games programme to be an Olympic torchbearer in recognition of her sporting achievements. On 21 July 2012, Begum carried the Olympic Torch in Stepney Green, London.

== See also ==
- British Asians in association football
- British Bangladeshi
- List of British Bangladeshis
- List of football referees
