= SingleMuslim.com =

Matrimonial website designed for and marketed to Muslims

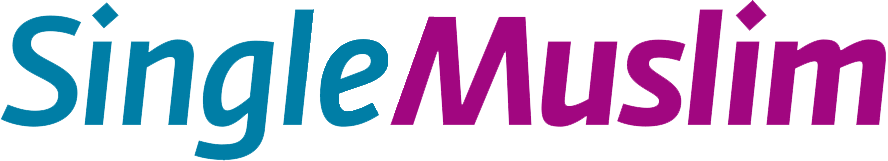

- Homepage on 9 July 2008
- Website type: Matrimonial website
- Available in: English
- Owner: Adeem Younis
- Creator: Adeem Younis
- Revenue: £100,000
- Website: www.singlemuslim.com
- Commercial: Yes
- Registration: Yes
- Users: approx 2,000,000
- Launched: 1 August 2000
- Current status: Active

SingleMuslim.com is a matrimonial website designed for and marketed to Muslims. The website was launched on 1 August 2000, and its headquarters is in Wakefield, West Yorkshire, England.

== History ==
Founder and managing director Adeem Younis conceived the idea for SingleMuslim.com when he was a 19-year-old undergraduate student at the University of Leeds.

As well as being available in the United Kingdom, the website also has Pakistani-, Canadian-, Australian-, and American-centered web pages.

SingleMuslim.com also works in partnership with Muslim Marriage Events. In 2010, 130,000 members signed up to their events in the United Kingdom.

== Features ==
SingleMuslim.com works as an introductions agency to help single Muslims find a compatible marriage partner, as an alternative to using traditional methods. Gold Membership entitles users full access to all the services offered by the website. Women are offered Gold Membership free of charge, whereas men are required to pay for Gold Membership packages on a reoccurring subscription.

The website allows users to create a profile with personal, faith-based, educational, and professional information, and upload pictures. Users can send instant messages to members of the opposite gender, and send them virtual gifts. Users can perform searches of the member database based on criteria such as age, religious sect, location, country of origin, piety, citizenship, language(s), marital status, education, and profession. The website also has a real time live chat feature.

The website team manually vet each profile data and photographs for authenticity. The website is also self-regulating so users can report other users who are misusing the service, or who may not be genuine users, and there is a zero-tolerance policy in place where such people will be removed. Family or friends can also register on the website on behalf of someone.

SingleMuslim.com is available on mobile and desktop, and has Android and iOS apps, which were rated 5 out of 5 by Dating Scout reviews. It is among the top 10 matchmaking websites across the UK.

== Statistics ==
By the end of 2002, SingleMuslim.com had over 10,000 registered users registered. By June 2005, there were over 50,000 active accounts on the website, and in December 2006 the website had its 100,000th user. The website has over 14,000 new members joining the website every month and an increasing number of international members are being drawn to the website. As of August 2010, there were over registered 500,000 members, which rose to 600,000 members in January 2011. More than 500 new user accounts are registered every day. In October 2012, the website had its millionth user. Since 2004, the website has seen a 1,000 percent growth in users and a tenfold increase in turnover. By 2023, the site had over 2,000,000 members.

Since 2007, SingleMuslim.com has learned of an average of four new marriages every day. The website is thought to have brought around 10,000 marriages. On average two people a day leave the website having found success.

Around half of the website's users are British Muslims, therefore 10 percent of the UK's 2.4 million Muslims are registered with SingleMuslim.com, and on average the website receives over 40,000 unique visits every day.

== Surveys ==
SingleMuslim.com uses its matrimonial service to conduct surveys gauging the views of its international user base.

In July 2009, a survey revealed that an overwhelming majority of Muslims believe that, ideally, Muslims should be married by the age of 25.

In February 2010, a survey found that Muslim couples were scaling back their wedding celebrations.

In May 2010, A survey revealed that most Muslims who stated a preference believe pre-marital health screening is essential.

In October 2010, a survey revealed that a majority of the Muslims believe that they would personally not choose to practise polygamy given the choice.

In January 2011, A survey showed that Muslims (particularly Muslim women) prefer to marry closer to home. The survey concluded that more than 65 percent of members would prefer their ideal marriage partner to come from the same country as them. A third of those polled would prefer their future spouse to come from the same town or city.

In February 2011, a survey showed that the majority of Muslim men would prefer to marry someone younger.

== Media and reception ==
On 3 October 2007, BBC One broadcast a documentary about SingleMuslim.com called Single British Muslims.com. In August 2008, the website featured on a two episodes of six-part ITV1 series, A Match Made in Heaven.

In June 2009, Majid Nagra, candidate from series 5 of BBC reality television programme The Apprentice, endorsed the website.

In August 2010, Catherine Heseltine, Muslim Public Affairs Committee UK (MPACUK) CEO, married her husband Muhammad Ali who she met using the website.

In March 2012, Rashid Khan and Damon Scully, who appeared on Channel 4 documentary series Make Bradford British, endorsed the website.

The platform was featured in British Muslim romantic comedy Finding Fatimah, commissioned to raise funds for charity Penny Appeal, also founded by SingleMuslim.com director Adeem Younis.

== See also ==
- Arranged marriage
- Comparison of online dating websites
- Matchmaking
- Matrimonial website
- Online dating service
- Comparison of online dating services
- List of social networking websites
