= Skipton Girls' High School =

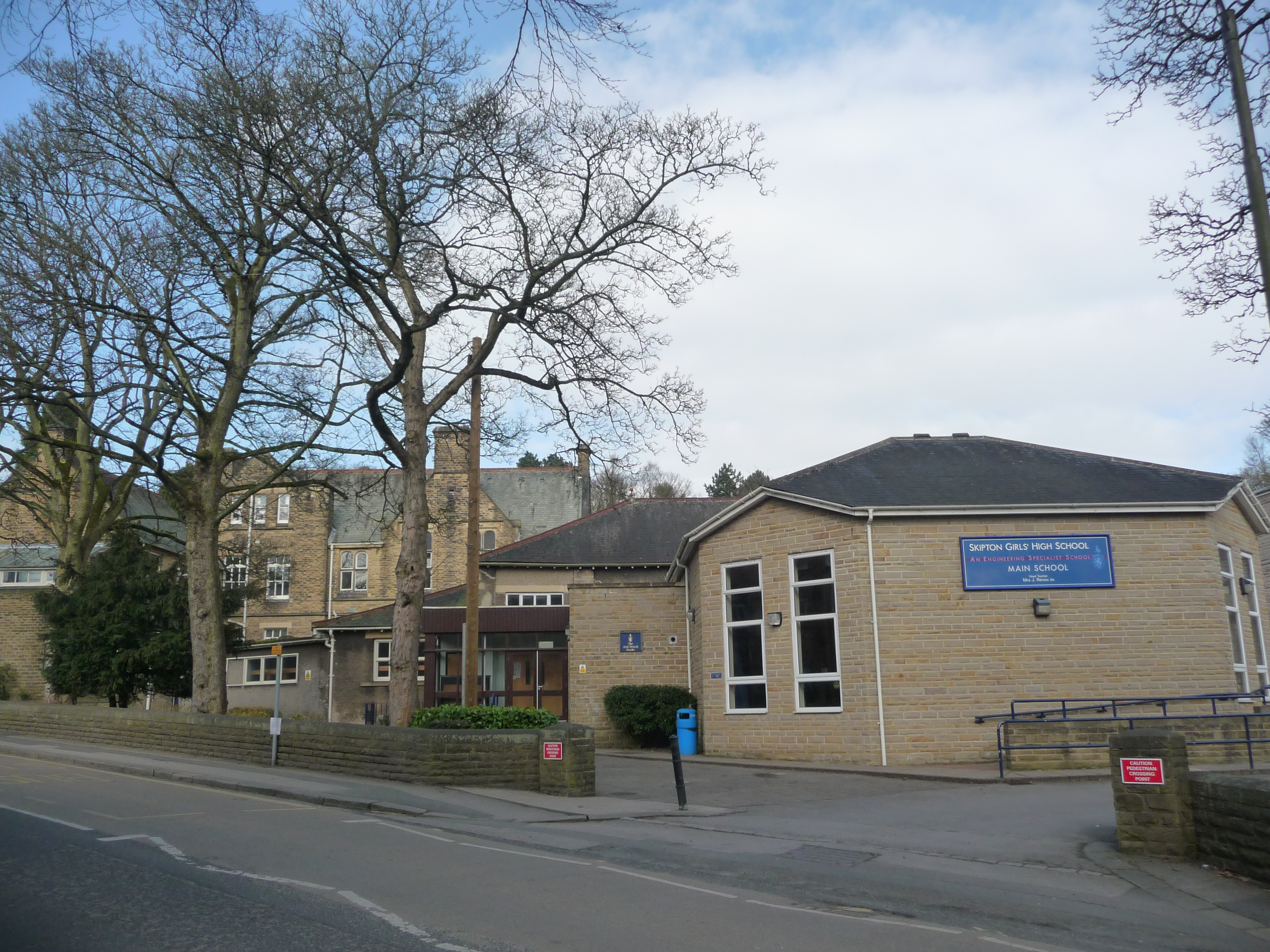

Location
- Gargrave Road; Skipton, North Yorkshire, BD23 1QL; England
- Coordinates: 53.963576°N 2.02747°W

Information
- Type: Grammar school; Academy
- Established: 1886
- Local authority: North Yorkshire Council
- Department for Education URN: 136664 Tables
- Ofsted: Reports
- Head of Academy: Martha Featherstone
- Gender: Female
- Age: 11 to 18
- Enrolment: 780
- Houses: Former: Broadbent, Larner and Wise.Then Pembroke, Norton, DeRomille and Clifford. Current: Bronte, Johnson, Curie and Franklin
- Colours: Bronte; Johnson; Curie; Franklin
- Website: www.sghs.org.uk

Skipton Girls' High School, founded in 1886 by the Petyt Trust, is an all-girls selective grammar school situated in Skipton, North Yorkshire, England. The school is a founding member of Northern Star Academies Trust, and leads Northern Lights Teaching School Alliance and Northern Lights SCITT. The school has over 800 students.

== Status ==
The school was awarded specialist status as an Engineering College in September 2003, becoming the first all-girls school to achieve this status. It also has Investors in People accreditation and Fair Trade FairAchiever status. On 1 April 2011, the school became an academy and on 1 April 2015, the school established the Multi-Academy Trust Northern Star Academies Trust.

== Admission ==
As an academy Trust, the Governors are responsible for admissions. Girls who wish to join the school sit a selection test. There is no selection test for entrance into the Sixth Form, as pupils are admitted on the basis of their GCSE grades.

Pupils joining the Sixth Form are expected to have achieved 5 9-4 grades, including English and Mathematics, at GCSE and at least grade 6 at GCSE in the subjects they want to study at A Level.

== Ofsted inspections ==
The school underwent an Ofsted inspection in September 2022 and was graded 'Outstanding' for behaviour and attitudes and 'Good' overall.

== Old Girls' Guild ==
The Old Girls' Guild began on 24 November 1917. The idea of the Guild developed whilst Miss Larner was Headmistress, when staff and former pupils would meet. Miss Broadbent continued this, organising social events. The Guild's first magazine was published in 1918 and, with the exception of 1920, one has been published every year. Bound copies of the magazine are held at Skipton Reference Library.

The Guild disbanded in 2017 and no longer meets.

== Houses ==
Each pupil is in one of four houses, each of which has a house colour. Each house is named after a woman or women of note from history: Bronte (red) is named after the Brontë sisters; Curie (yellow) after Marie Curie; Franklin (blue) after Rosalind Franklin; and Johnson (green) after Amy Johnson.

The original four houses of Skipton Girls' High School were Clifford (yellow), de Romille (red), Norton (blue) and Pembroke (green). These names linked the school to the Craven area - Clifford, de Romille and Pembroke all being related to Skipton Castle. Later, three houses taking the names of former headteachers (Broadbent, Larner and Wise) were used.

== Sixth Form ==
The school offers a wide range of subjects at A Level; most students study three subjects, with exceptionally able students able to choose a fourth subject if they wish.

The Extended Project Qualification (EPQ), a standalone qualification at A Level standard intended as preparation for university or a future career, is also offered.

In 2022, the pass rate (grades A*-E) was 99.7%, with 71.5% at grades A*-B. 35% of students went on to Russell Group universities. Three students went to Cambridge, and two to Oxford.

Sixth Form results typically put the school in the top 100 state schools in the country for A-Level results.

== Notable former pupils ==
- Claire Brooks (1931–2008) – politician
- Elizabeth Harwood (1938–1990) – opera singer
- Ruzwana Bashir – first British Asian woman to become President of the Oxford Union
- Katherine Langrish – fantasy writer

== See also ==
- Ermysted's Grammar School
- Harrogate High School - joint founder of Northern Star Academies Trust
