= Saeed Vaseghi =

Saeed Vaseghi (Persian: سعیدواثقی) is a British Iranian speech scientist. Professor Vaseghi is the professor of Communication Signal Processing at Brunel University. His PhD and postdoctoral research work at Cambridge led to the development of CEDAR Audio Ltd., one of the first commercial digital signal processing systems for restoration of degraded archived audio signals.

== Awards and nominations ==
In January 2015, Vaseghi was nominated for the Services to Science and Engineering award at the British Muslim Awards.
