= British Muslim TV =

- British Muslim TV logo used since June 2014
- Country: United Kingdom
- Headquarters: Wakefield, England

Ownership
- Owner: Esplanade Vale Media Limited

History
- Launched: 10 June 2014; 12 years ago
- Closed: 28 June 2024; 2 years ago

Links
- Website: britishmuslim.tv

British Muslim TV is a UK-based, digital brand and former free-to-air, English language, Islamic-focused satellite television channel.

The company is independently owned by Mr Arshad Ashraf and funded solely by commercial advertising.

== Premise ==
British Muslim TV was conceptualised towards the end of 2013 and underwent planning from the start of 2014.

In June 2014, British Muslim TV was launched on Sky describing itself as, "a new Sky channel that provides both Muslim and non-Muslim communities with news, views and insights into how British Muslims live. We will also present content from our community, for our community, with the aim to make British Muslims feel confidently Muslim and comfortably British." The channel added, "viewers will be treated to a range of engaging, entertaining and educational content, aimed at showcasing the best that our British Muslim community has to offer."

Prominent former advertisers include British Muslim charities Read Foundation and Penny Appeal. In 2014, Roshan Salih, Editor of 5 Pillars published a web article calling for the channel to be re-named "Penny Appeal TV" due to the brands substantial presence on the channel. In 2015, Penny Appeal was awarded a Guinness World Record for the longest live broadcast for a charitable event which lasted 11 days 11 hr 11 min on British Muslim TV.

As the channel celebrated its tenth anniversary in 2024, British Muslim TV relocated its studios to 130 Westgate in Wakefield, distancing itself from Penny Appeal Campus. With Penny Appeal claiming that the charity and the channel had always been separate entities.

== Content ==
Shows broadcast included Marriage Made in Britain, Talking Booth, Halal Kitchen, British Muslim Teen Vision and Women Like Us, a female-led panel show covering a range of issues relating to British Muslim women.

The on-screen talent of the channel included Guz Khan, Lauren Booth and Myriam François.

== Awards ==
In January 2015, British Muslim TV won the Responsible Media of the Year award at the British Muslim Awards.

== Growth ==
In 2016, the channel commissioned the production of British romantic comedy film Finding Fatimah, which was released in UK cinemas in April 2017.

In 2018, British Muslim TV collaborated with Church Times and Jewish News to publish an interfaith list of young leaders.

In February 2020, Joseph Hayat was announced as the new editor-in-chief of the channel.

In October 2020, the channel commissioned 'The Naz Shah Show' hosted by Naz Shah MP, making her the first-ever female British MP to have her own television show.

In Q2 of 2021, British Muslim TV had over 1 million viewers tuned in, in the first two weeks of Ramadan according to viewing figures from BARB, the UK’s industry standard television audience measurement service.

In April 2022, Seyfi Onur Sayin the Turkish Consul General inaugurated British Muslim TV's reportedly £150,000 refurbished studio featuring a 30 square metre video wall.

== Exit from Sky ==
On 28 June 2024, Biz Asia reported that British Muslim TV had been removed from Sky's EPG suggesting that British Muslim TV would continue to operate as a digital-only channel. This was later confirmed by Founder Arshad Ashraf citing the move as a "revised linear strategy and further embrace of digital."

In July 2024, it was announced that Joseph Hayat was leaving the channel as editor-in-chief with Arshad Ashraf expressing appreciation to Hayat for "championing such transition."

== See also ==
- List of Islamic television and radio stations in the United Kingdom
