= Mandie Quark =

American mycologist

Mandie Quark is an American molecular biologist and mycologist. She currently serves as communications director for the California Fungal Diversity Survey (FUNDIS). She specializes in DNA barcoding of new and recognized species of fungi in California and the western hemisphere. Circa 2023, Quark and Alan Rockefeller, in cooperation with the indigenous Sacha-Wasi people, started a project devoted to cataloging Ecuadorian fungi species. Quark studied chemistry at St. Mary's College of Maryland in Maryland, and has a master's degree in biochemistry.
