= Sarwar Ahmed =

British publisher (born 1971)

- সরয়ার আহমেদ
- Born: 9 July 1971 (age 54); Keighley, Yorkshire, England
- Occupation: Publisher
- Years active: 1989–present
- Known for: Founder of Eastern Eye
- Children: 2

Sarwar Ahmed (Bengali: সরয়ার আহমেদ; born 9 July 1971) is a British publisher, founder of Eastern Eye, and publisher of Asiana and Asiana Wedding.

== Background ==
Ahmed was born in Keighley, West Yorkshire and his family moved to London when he was six months old. He was brought up in East London. His father was a Bengali journalist.

== Career ==
In 1989, at the age of 18, Ahmed founded Eastern Eye and was the managing director of Smart Asian Media Limited. He was formerly publisher of Ethnic Media Group (EMG), a subsidiary of Southnews plc.

Ahmed became editor-in-chief of four newspapers, having bought the Asian Times, The Caribbean Times and New Nation, then sold up to launch Smart Asian Media, publishers of Asian Woman magazine, Asian Bride and Asian Xpress newspaper. He later sold Smart Asian Media and launched Asiana magazine.

In 2002, Ahmed was appointed to The Newspapers Panel of the Competition Commission. He is currently publisher of Asiana and Asiana Wedding.

== Awards ==
In January 2013, Ahmed was awarded the Services to Media award at the British Muslim Awards.

== See also ==
- British Bangladeshi
- List of British Bangladeshis
