= Perween Warsi =

- Born: 10 August 1956 (age 69); Muzaffarpur, Bihar, India
- Occupation: Consultant
- Spouse: Talib Warsi
- Children: Sadiq and Abid

Perween Warsi CBE (born 10 August 1956), was the founder and Chief Executive of S&A Foods until 2015.

== Biography ==
Warsi was born in Muzaffarpur in India in 1956 and moved to the United Kingdom in 1975.

She began her business making ethnic finger foods from her kitchen. In 1986, after being appalled by the quality of a supermarket-purchased samosa, she founded S&A foods, winning her first major contract to supply chilled and frozen dishes to Asda and Morrisons stores, having secured the contract via blind tasting.

In 1987, S&A Foods was acquired by the Hughes Food Group (which would ultimately go into receivership in 1990), with the resulting investment injection allowing them to open the first S&A Foods factory, in Derby, creating over 100 jobs for the area. In 1996 a new, larger bespoke factory was built next to the original site.

S&A Foods was reported in 2005 to be producing two million meals a week, employing over 1300 people, and had an annual turnover in the region of £100 million. Warsi was named in the same year by the Confederation of British Industry (CBI) in its First Women Awards as one of Britain's 10 most remarkable women.

In 2015 her company S&A foods based in Derby went into administration due to losing a contract with ASDA, causing all 300 staff members at the company to be made redundant.

Since 2016, she has been working as a consultant to owner managed businesses in the food sector through her company Succeda. She is also a member of Derby City Council's Renaissance Board, which promotes economic development in the area.

Mike Coupe, chief executive of J Sainsbury, described Warsi in 2017 as a self-made CEO and leader who has been "an influential driving force in the food industry. Her visionary approach introduced innovation in the fresh chilled, frozen and longer life segments, which has delivered significant change and progress to quality in the UK market."

== Awards and nominations ==
In January 2013, Warsi was nominated for the Businesswoman of the Year award at the British Muslim Awards.

== Personal life ==
Perween and Talib Warsi married in 1972. The couple have two sons, Sadiq and Abid, after whom S&A Foods was named. Perween is a shia.

== Awards ==
- 1996: Woman Entrepreneur of the World Award
- 1997: MBE, New Year's Honours list
- 2002: CBE, Queen's Jubilee Honours list
