= Islamic Help =

Islamic organization based in the United Kingdom

- Founded: 2003
- Type: International NGO
- Purpose: Poverty reduction, disaster resilience, education, healthcare, sustainable livelihoods
- Headquarters: Birmingham, UK
- Region served: Worldwide
- Key people: Chair of Trustees: Sultan Fiaz Hassan
- Income: £6.2 million (2018)
- Disbursements: £5.38 million
- Expenses: £870,000
- Website: islamichelp.org.uk

Islamic Help is a UK based charity that was founded in 2003 and works both internationally and within the UK. According to their registration with the UK Charity Commission, “Islamic Help provides humanitarian assistance all around the world. Support is also provided to the needy, widows, victims of emergency natural/manmade disasters and homelessness in the UK”. Islamic help characterizes itself by its ability to inspire, motivate, and mobilize young individuals wishing to provide assistance to disaster stricken communities.

The organization is a member of the Muslim Charities Forum, which serves as an umbrella organization for multiple UK-based Muslim charitable organizations and has been criticized for its member's alleged extremist ties, allegations which extend to Islamic Help and which have been refuted by the charity.

== Background ==
Islamic Help was founded in 2003 by young individuals in a grassroots initiative to provide assistance following natural disasters. Shortly after the organization's creation, they were able to provide disaster relief after the Pacific Ocean tsunami, the Bam earthquake, and the Pakistan earthquake.

Islamic Help has worked in more than 20 countries and has multiple offices worldwide in Birmingham, Pakistan, Bangladesh, Tanzania, Gaza, Yemen, Jordan and Australia.

The charity is based in the UK and has its UK office in Balsall Heath, Birmingham.

== Activities and Projects ==
Islamic Help carries out a wide variety of projects worldwide.

In March 2012, the organization started the Eco Village, a three-year project in Tanzania which will create a community for orphans. Islamic Help also runs a sponsorship program for helping orphans in Africa, Asia, and the Middle East. Islamic Help has helped to build water pumps and solar powered wells water deprived countries, particularly in Tanzania, Bangladesh, and Pakistan. The organization also has a sponsorship program for sponsoring a well or water pump in one of the three countries.

They have engaged in efforts for women's empowerment, teaching them skills that make them more independent and self-sufficient. One such initiative was teaching impoverished women about beekeeping allowing them to have a sustainable livelihood.

Islamic Help also has initiatives in the UK focusing on food aid and nutrition, cleanup jobs, and assistance for the homeless.

Since 2017 Islamic Help has been working directly with Rohingya refugees in Bangladesh, raising money and distributing supplies.

The Islamic Health Birth Campaign helps pregnant Syrian refugees living in Jordan with access to healthcare services, food, clothing and sanitary items.

== Controversy ==
Islamic Help is one of several members of the Muslim Charities Forum that has alleged extremist ties. In early 2015, Muslim Charities Forum was stripped of a grant from the UK government due to their alleged extremist ties. Islamic Help also lost state funding for English language courses following an event to which they invited a speaker with extremist views. A spokesman for Islamic Help said the individual had not been publicly named by the Government and it had not received any notification from the Government about any individual/s or event/s of concern. He said they had asked the Government whether there was a publicly available list of so-called extremist speakers, and what criteria were used to determine this, and had been told none existed. The spokesman stated "We utterly refute any accusations of being linked to or of playing any part in promoting extremist views or extremism."

== Awards and nominations ==
In January 2015, Islamic Help was nominated for the Charity of the Year award at the British Muslim Awards. In February 2016, it was awarded the Charity of the Year award at the British Muslim Awards.

The organization was featured in Academy Award-winning documentary "Saving Face" about the work that the charity does in helping victims of Pakistani acid attacks.
