= Tasnim Nazeer =

British journalist

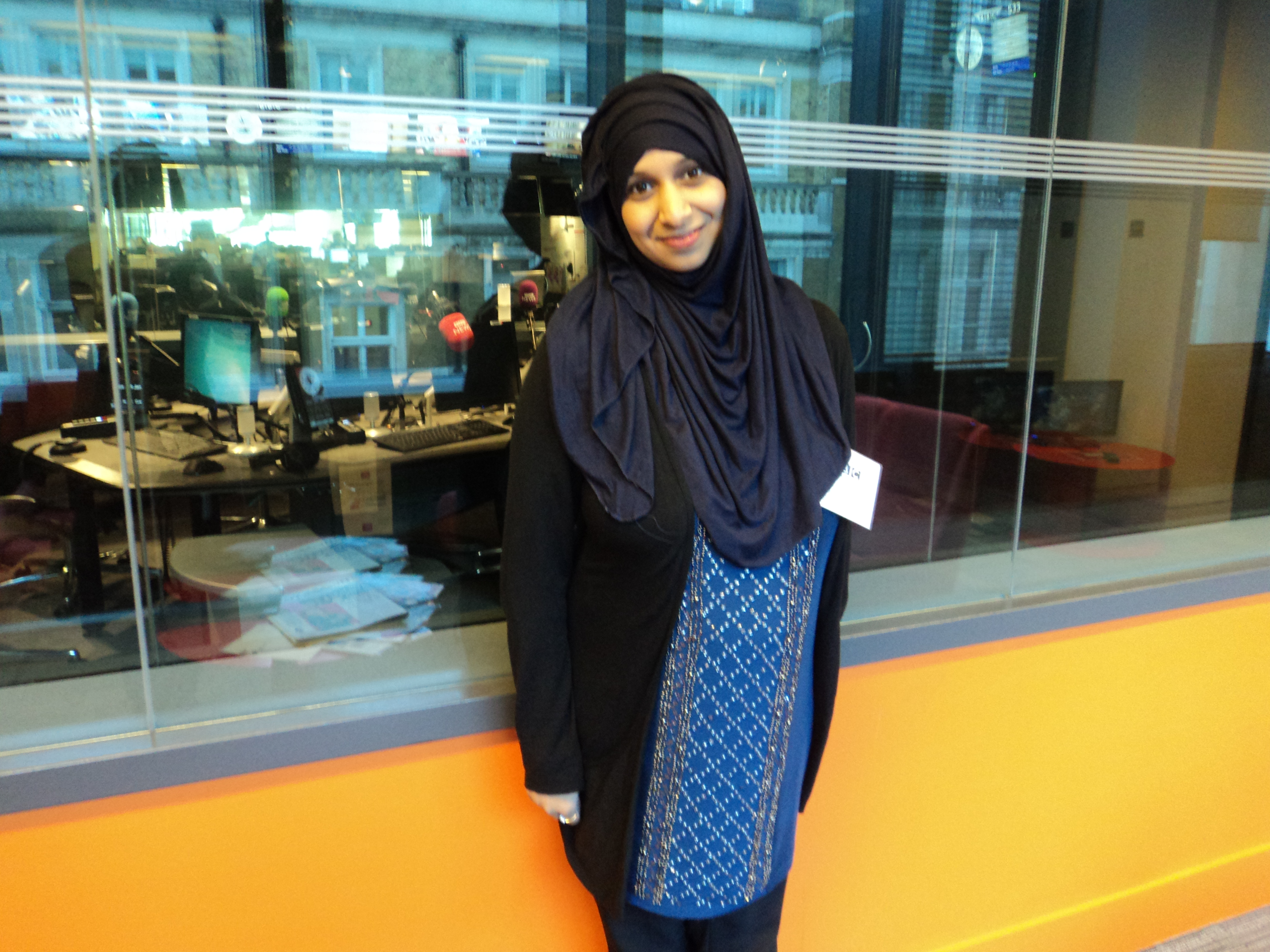
- Born: Tasnim Nazeer
- Education: Edinburgh Napier University; The Open University; University of the Arts London
- Occupations: Journalist, author
- Notable credit(s): Al Jazeera, BBC, CNN, Forbes
- Website: www.tasnimnazeer.com

Tasnim Nazeer is a British journalist, author and Universal Peace Federation Ambassador for Peace Nazeer became Scotland's first hijab-wearing freelance TV reporter in July 2020. She has written for Al Jazeera, HuffPost, The Independent online, CNN, BBC News Online, The Guardian, TRT World, Middle East Eye and others. Nazeer was awarded The Muslim News Ibn Battuta Award for Excellence in Media 2013 and the FIPP Rising Stars in Media Award 2018 for her work in her capacity as a journalist.

== Education and career ==
Nazeer studied Journalism in 2007 at the University of the Arts London, has an Open University BA Honours degree in English Language and Literature. and a master's degree in International Journalism from Edinburgh Napier University. In 2011 Nazeer was given the Ambassador for Peace Award from the Universal Peace Federation for work in the media. She was shortlisted for the 2014 British Muslim Awards, 2012 Asian Women of Achievement Award in Media and 2011 Muslim Writers Awards Young Journalist of the Year. In 2015 she was a guest panelist on BBC Big Questions. She has been a guest interview on BBC Radio 4 Woman's Hour, BBC Radio Scotland and BBC Asian Network. Tasnim has also made an appearance on BBC Radio 2 Pause for Thought.

Nazeer has written children's books Allah's Gifts (2012) and Aleena Celebrates Eid (2015)., Muslimah's Key to Jannah (2015) and Islamic Finance: A Practical Introduction (2018). She is an Ambassador for Peace for the Universal Peace Federation, and has freelanced for Al Jazeera, The Huffington Post and Forbes Middle East.

In 2024, she won the Media person of the year award at Asian Achievers Awards for her contribution to journalism and her work amplifying South Asian voices in the media.

== Personal life ==
Nazeer lives in London, United Kingdom .

== Bibliography ==
- Nazeer, Tasnim;(2012-02-02). Allah's Gifts. Greenbird Books. ISBN 9780956214171.
- Nazeer, Tasnim (2015-04-07). Muslimah's Key to Jannah. CreateSpace Publishers
- Nazeer, Tasnim (2015-01-01). Aleena Celebrates Eid. IIPH Books. ISBN 978-603-501-287-4.
- Nazeer, Tasnim (2018-04-30). It's Ramadan. IIPH Books. ISBN 978-603-501-347- 5.
- Nazeer, Tasnim (2019-11-30). Islamic Finance: A Practical Introduction. Kube Publishing. ISBN 9780860376354.
