= Granville Technology Group =

British computer maker and retailer

- Type: Public company
- Industry: Retail
- Founded: 1994; 32 years ago
- Founder: Tahir Mohsan
- Defunct: 2005; 21 years ago
- Headquarters: Simonstone, Lancashire (1994–2005)
- Products: Computers
- Number of employees: 1,600
- Subsidiaries: Time Computer Systems, Tiny Computers, Colossus, Omega, MJN

Granville Technology Group Ltd was a British computer retailer and manufacturer based in Simonstone, near Burnley, Lancashire, marketing its products under the brand names Time, Tiny, Colossus, Omega and MJN.

It sold mainly through mail order, though late in its life, the firm added a chain of shops in the United Kingdom that traded as The Computer Shop, and rapidly grew to over 300 stores. The main competitors were PC World, Comet, and Maplin.

Granville Technology Group had 3 manufacturing companies but operated in the same place. The companies were called VMT, GTG and OMT all operated under Granville Technology Group Limited as subsidiaries. VMT was the manufacturing department and GTG was the office part of Granville Technology Group.

== History ==
Formerly known as Time Group, the company was formed in 1994, by Tahir Mohsan.

The manufacturing unit was located at Time Technology Park, in Simonstone. The company produced computers under the Tiny and Time Computers brands, although tracing the ownership of these brands later proved difficult for administrators Grant Thornton due to the group's convoluted and opaque ownership structure.

In the year ending June 2003, the group made profits of £2.5m before tax with a turnover of £207m,. The company went into receivership on 27 July 2005, due to the fall in demand for personal computers. That month, it employed 1,600 people, and was one of the largest retailers of computers in the United Kingdom.

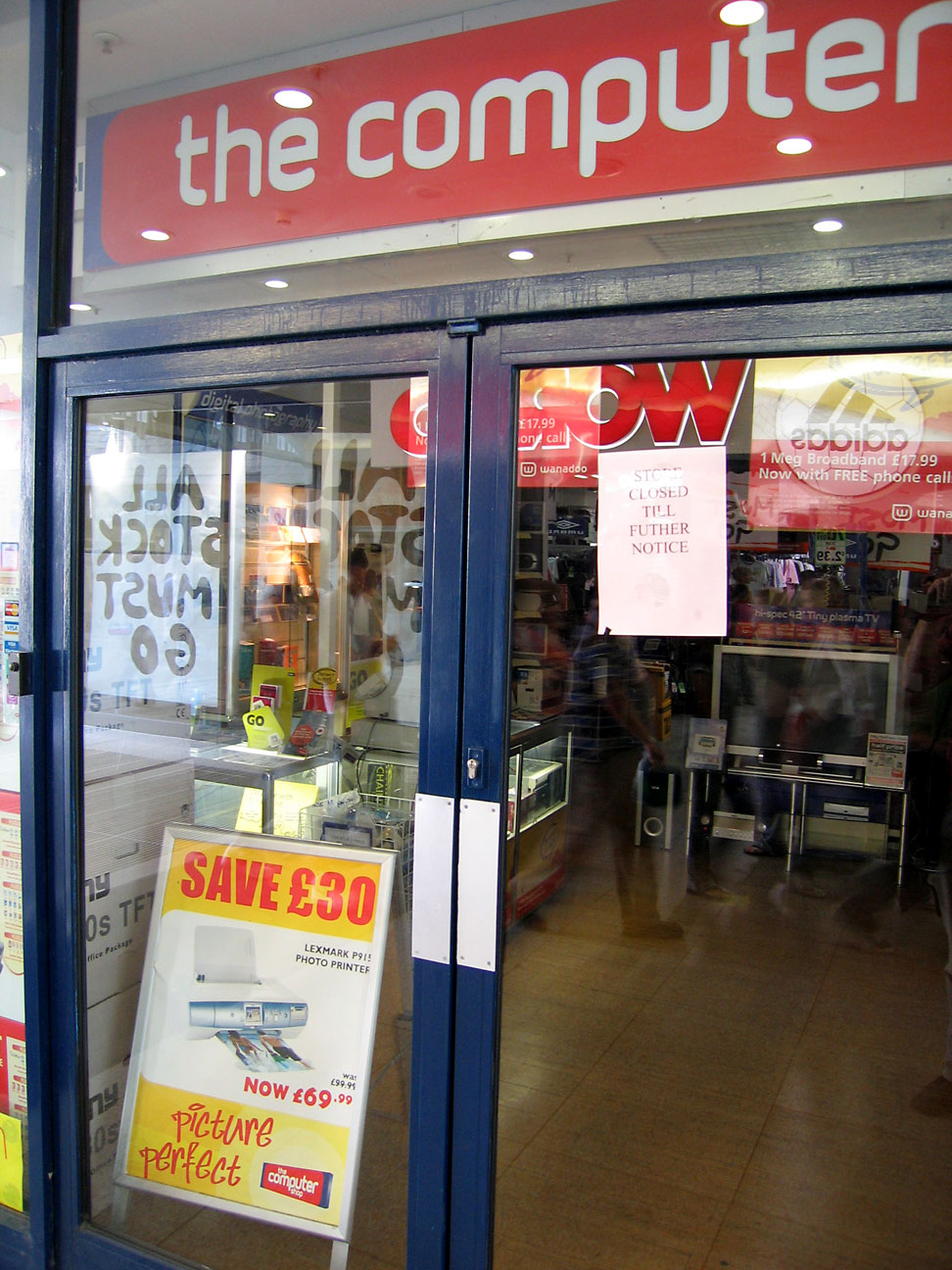
A Computer Shop (The company's computer store announced the closure due to the bankruptcy of the parent company, and the closure announcement was posted on the door of the store. (Contents on paper: "Our store is closed until further notice")

== Time UK ==
Time logo

Time UK (also known as Time Computers) was the main supplier and manufacturer for GTG. Their products included desktop computers, notebooks, and flat screen televisions. The company supported consumers who purchased Time products from Granville Technology Group Ltd. The company's manufacturing plant and headquarter was based at Simonstone, Lancashire, in the private industrial park, the Time Technology Park, named after its brand.

With a turnover of £750 million during the 1990s, the firm became Britain's largest computer manufacturer, by establishing its market in the United Kingdom, Middle East, and the Far East. It was selling computers through retailers, and a chain of stores, The Computer Shop, which was established by Granville Technology Group.

In 1999, Time offered a "free PC" where customers could obtain a Windows 98 PC for no upfront cost, but were required to sign up to Time's internet service provider for 24 months.

Mohsan subdivided the company into Time Computers and Time Computer Systems, in order to segregate manufacturing and retailing. The company went into administration on 27 July 2005. In March 2006, the brand was rebranded as Time UK.

Time UK television commercials used Leonard Nimoy, of Star Trek fame, who reprised his Mr. Spock character. In August 2000, Time UK handed its advertising account to HHCL & Partners, which saw the end of the adverts featuring Leonard Nimoy.

== Lawsuits ==
In 2000 Time UK sued IBM over supplying Time UK with faulty components but eventually Time UK won an out-of-court settlement and no further charges were held against IBM.
