= Rimla Akhtar =

British businesswoman

Rimla Akhtar OBE (born 1982/83) is a British businesswoman and sports administrator, who champions inclusivity in sport. She was the first person who publicly identified themselves as an Asian, Muslim woman on the Football Association Council. She has spoken many times on the need for sports to adapt to accommodate Muslim athletes, and has called for an increase in diversity within sports and football.

== Biography ==
Akhtar was born to Pakistani parents, and grew up in Harrow, London.

She is the Chairwoman of the Muslim Women's Sport Foundation (MWSF).

Akhtar has served on the boards of several organisations. She is currently an independent trustee of Kick It Out, an English organisation campaigning against racism in football. She has also held memberships of the Asian and Muslim Women and Girls Working Group, as well as the Referees Diversity Action Group. From December 2019 to December 2023 she served on the board of the Rugby Football League.

== Honours, awards and achievements ==
Akhtar was listed as an Asian Women of Achievement by The Independent in 2013. In 2015, she was listed at number 15 in a list of the most influential women in sport by The Independent. She was also nominated for Muslim Woman of the Year for the British Muslim Awards in the same year.

She earned an Honorary Doctorate of Science from the University of East London (UEL), and the University of Roehampton in 2017.

She was ranked at number 14 in a list of the Most Powerful Women in Sports by Forbes in 2018.

Akhtar was appointed Member of the Order of the British Empire (MBE) in the 2015 Birthday Honours and Officer of the Order of the British Empire (OBE) in the 2021 Birthday Honours, both for services to equality and diversity in sport.

== Projects and Campaigns ==
In 2018, Akhar visited Jordan on behalf of Equal Playing Field and the Asian Football Development Project (AFDP) to deliver a project in support of women's football and empowerment. The project also set out to set the Guinness World Record for the lowest football match, which was played on a pitch built by the Dead Sea.
