= Ruzwana Bashir =

British businesswoman

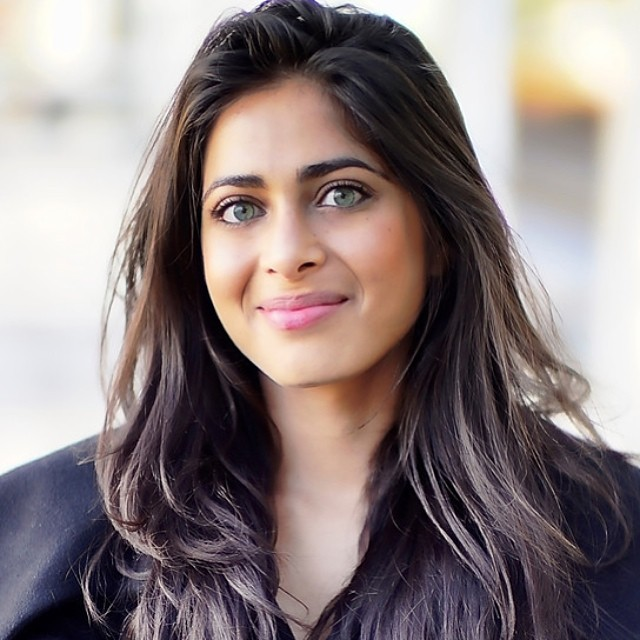
- Born: 28 July 1983 (age 43); Skipton, North Yorkshire, England
- Education: Skipton Girls' High School; University of Oxford; Harvard Business School (MBA)
- Occupation: Entrepreneur

Ruzwana Bashir (born 28 July 1983) is a British-American entrepreneur, founder and CEO of Peek, a travel company based in San Francisco, California. She was selected in 2012 for Forbes 30 Under 30 list on Technology and in 2014 for Fast Company's 100 Most Creative People as well as Vanity Fair's Next Establishment.

== Early life and education ==
Bashir was born and grew up in Skipton and attended Skipton Girls' High School in North Yorkshire.

Bashir attended New College at the University of Oxford to read Philosophy, Politics and Economics.

While at Oxford, Bashir beat James Forsyth in the election for President of the Oxford Union debating society in March 2004. However, she subsequently had to face a tribunal, accused of irregular canvassing in the shape of courting votes in her college on polling day. Friends of Bashir commented that the opposition to her was really "because of the colour of her skin and because she is a Muslim". The tribunal found Forsyth guilty of electoral malpractice. The Guardian commented that "Frivolous complaints have become the raison d'être of the Oxford Union", and subsequently the electoral rules of the Union were changed, so that others would not fall foul of the same problem.

When Bashir assumed the presidency of the Oxford Union in Michaelmas Term 2004 she became only the second Muslim to hold the position after former Pakistani Prime Minister Benazir Bhutto. During her tenure as president, Bashir's guest speakers included Senator John McCain, Michael Heseltine, Norman Lamont, Kenneth Clarke, John Redwood, David Trimble, Tom Ford, Hans Blix, and José María Aznar. In 2004, Bashir met Boris Johnson (himself a former President of the Union), and in October Johnson visited Oxford to speak at a debate entitled 'This House has No Confidence in Her Majesty's Government'.

After Oxford University, Bashir was a Fulbright Scholar at the Harvard Business School where she obtained an MBA.

== Business career ==
Bashir worked in private equity at the Blackstone Group and in investment banking at Goldman Sachs in London. She then worked at Gilt Groupe, and was part of the founding team at Art.sy in New York.

In 2012, Bashir founded Peek, a marketplace for travellers and locals to book activities in holiday destinations. Peek, where Bashir is CEO, has received financing by investors including Eric Schmidt, Jack Dorsey, and David Bonderman. Bashir met Peek's co-founder and chief technology officer, Oskar Bruening, in New York and by the end of the day they decided to start a company together. In November 2013, Bashir announced that Peek developed Peek Pro, a suite of backend tools to help tour operators run their businesses, and in December 2013, Peek launched a mobile app version of its site.

In 2014, Peek raised $5 million in funding. In 2016, Peek raised a further $10 million and Trulia founder Pete Flint joined the Board.

In 2018, the company raised a $23 million fundraising round and inked a partnership with Google. In 2019, Forbes wrote that "Peek could be North America's next Travel Unicorn".

In 2021, Peek joined SoFi's board of directors.

Since founding Peek Bashir has been cited as one of the most powerful women in technology alongside Sheryl Sandberg and Marissa Mayer. In 2014, she was named one of the Most Promising Women Entrepreneurs by Fortune, one of the Most Influential Women in Business by the San Francisco Business Times, and one of Glamour's "35 Under 35 Who Are Changing the Tech Industry." That same year, Peek was named one of the Top 50 Websites of 2014 by Time and one of the World's Top 10 Most Innovative Companies in Travel by Fast Company. In 2016 Fortune magazine labelled Bashir "Silicon Valley’s Favorite British Import". In 2022, Bashir was a winner in Ernst & Young's Entrepreneur Of The Year Awards.

== Personal life ==
Bashir was reported in 2009 to be dating actor Toby Kebbell. Bashir and Kebbell met at a Christmas party. They were pictured together in the Daily Mirror and in February 2009 attended the 62nd British Academy Film Awards event together. In 2014, Bashir was reported to be dating Ben Rattray, the founder of Change.org, with whom she attended the Time 100 Gala.

On 29 August 2014, Bashir wrote an article in The Guardian in which she told her story as a survivor of sexual abuse. Bashir's article was published in light of the 2014 investigations into the sexual abuse of 1,400 children in Rotherham, England between 1997 and 2013. Bashir cited the underreporting of abuse in the British-Pakistani community and the taboos around shame that perpetuates it. She calls upon the communities to give victims the support they need to come forward and bring the perpetrators to justice.
