= Qasim Rashid Ahmad =

British businessman

- قاسم رشید احمد

Personal life
- Born: 13 June 1970 (age 55)

Religious life
- Religion: Islam
- Denomination: Sunni
- Founder of: Al-Khair Foundation
- Jurisprudence: Hanafi
- Movement: Deobandi

Muslim leader
- Based in: United Kingdom

Qasim Rashid Ahmad (Urdu: قاسم رشید احمد) is the founder and chairman of Al-Khair Foundation (AKF), and also the CEO of IQRA TV. Since 2003, Ahmad has managed AKF from concept to delivery of projects, from fundraising to feedback reports, managing donors, staff and volunteers around the world.

He worked as a counsellor and teacher for reforming prisoners for nearly a decade at Her Majesty's Prisons.

== Experience ==
=== Visiting Imam at HMP prison services ===
Ahmad worked as a counsellor and teacher for reforming prisoners for nearly a decade at Her Majesty's Prisons. There he engaged in counselling and teaching the offenders, looking after their welfare and helping them to reform and not return to criminal activity after their release from prison.

=== Chairman and Founder of Al-Khair Foundation (AKF) ===
Ahmad founded the foundation, naming it 'Al-Khair’ which translates to ‘goodness’ in Arabic. He created and managed AKF as an Islamic school in Croydon in 2003. It evolved into a service organisation to the UK community first, with an initial focus on education, and also charity work. The Islamic school began with five enrolled pupils. By 2013, the school grew into a primary and secondary school with over 350 pupils. Later, AKF began to build schools overseas, which lead to their water aid, medical aid, and livelihood programmes. Today, Ahmad is largely involved in AKF's work in the UK, and internationally. He oversees many of the charity's aid and development programmes.

AKF's ’Let's Rebuild Pakistan’ campaign was one of the largest international relief efforts in the Foundation's history. In 2011, Ahmad cycled from John O’Groats in Scotland to Land's End in Cornwall over thirty days. This was shown on the Foundation's dedicated television channel, IQRA TV, helping to raise £2,000,000. Ahmad was named Fundraiser of the Year 2011 by JustGiving.
