= ISyllabus =

Five year Islamic studies programme in the UK

iSyllabus
- Motto: Islam • Iman • Ihsan
- Type: Islamic studies programme
- Educational Director: Shaykh Ruzwan Mohammed
- Project Director: Shaykh Amer Jamil
- Type: Charity (non-profit)
- Established: 2008; 18 years ago
- Founders: Shaykh Ruzwan Mohammed & Shaykh Amer Jamil
- Religious affiliation: Sunni Islam
- Students: 7000
- Location: 110 Flemington House, Suite G9 Springburn, Glasgow
- Website: www.isyllabus.org

iSyllabus is a five-year Islamic studies course developed and piloted at the University of Glasgow. The course first began in 2008 and has now taught over 7000 students across 15 cities. The course aims to give an introduction to the "Islamic sciences as they relate to both the individual and society in the 21st Century"—a key differentiator between it and other courses and "madrasa" curriculum which can be found throughout the United Kingdom.

== Vision ==
The course aims to "develop the next generation of active citizens and faith-inspired thought leaders in the West through transformative Islamic education programmes".

== Course differentiators ==
The course claims to deliver on five areas which differentiate it from other Islamic studies curricula:

1. "Relevance - Identifying the most relevant topics of religious discourse in the West
2. Function - Acknowledging the changing dynamics of religious leadership in the Modern world
3. Synthesis - Incorporating elements from successful Islamic studies syllabi of the Muslim world
4. Language - Nurturing the English language as a Muslim language of instruction
5. Competency - Developing religious literacy and competency in the Islamic sciences"

== Course structure ==
The course is divided into three levels:

- 'Diploma' (1 year)
- 'Intermediate' (2 years)
- 'Advanced' (2 years)

=== Diploma course ===
The diploma course covers the following 15 modules:

- The Laws of Purity & Prayer
  - Seeking purity
  - Setting the base for worship
  - Perfecting the Prayer
  - Returning to the Homeland
- Towards a Tranquil Soul
  - Towards a Tranquil Soul 1
  - Towards a Tranquil Soul 2
- Understanding the Divine Sources
  - Understanding the Qu'ran
  - Understanding the Sunnah
- Living the Law
  - Living the Law 1 - Theory
  - Living the Law 2 - Case Studies
- Articulating Muslim Creed
  - Understanding Muslim Creed 1
  - Understanding Muslim Creed 2
- Family & Society
  - Understanding the Law and Spirituality of Income and Charity
  - The Sacred Bond
- Orthodoxy & Orthopraxy
  - The Tradition of Scholars

NB: There is also iSyllabus for Schools which offers a set of 5 workbooks for GCSE students and have been designed with current day needs and understandings.

== Awards ==
List of Awards iSyllabus has been nominated for
Award	Year	Result
British Muslim Awards - 'Religious Advocate of the Year'	2014	Won
British Muslim Awards - 'Religious Advocate of the Year'	2017	Nominated

== Notable faculty ==
- Sohaib Saeed (born 1984), British scholar of Quranic studies
