= Noor TV =

British-based Islamic television channel

- Type: Islamic
- Country: United Kingdom
- Broadcast area: Europe, Africa, Middle East and parts of Asia
- Headquarters: London, United Kingdom

Programming
- Languages: Urdu, English
- Picture format: MPEG-4

Ownership
- Owner: Noor Ul Arfeen Siddiqui

History
- Launched: 2006; 20 years ago
- Founder: Muhammad Alauddin Siddiqui

Links
- Website: https://www.thenoor.tv/

NOOR TV UK (Noor meaning ‘light’ in Arabic) is an Islamic television channel founded by the Islamic Sufi scholar Muhammad Alauddin Siddiqui.

Pir Alauddin Siddiqui founded the channel in 2006. It is part of the Mohiuddin Trust.

Noor TV SKY Channel 739 is a UK based Satellite Television Channel that is broadcasting throughout Europe, Africa, Middle East, USA, Asia and many parts of the world via Eutelsat-28A and Pakistan at Satellites.

They usually show re-runs of the founder, Pir Alauddin Siddiqui going through texts such as an exegesis of the Qur'an or Rumi's Mathnawi.

== Controversies ==
In May 2012, a program was run on this channel which was hosted by Muhammad Farooq Nizami. He was asked about the proper response to those who do not respect Prophet Muhammad. He replied and said, “We are ready, and should be ready at all times, to kill a blasphemer.”

Frooq also justified the actions of Mumtaz Qadri, the police officer who assassinated Governor of Punjab Salmaan Taseer in 2011, by defying Taseer's calls for changes to the controversial blasphemy law.

In July, Britain’s Office of Communications fined £85,000 to TV channel after it broadcast a speech saying Muslims had a "duty to kill" anyone who insulted the Prophet Muhammad.
