= Muslim Hands =

Charitable organization

- Muslim Hands logo.
- Founded: 90
- Type: International NGO
- Purpose: Sustainable Livelihoods, Education, Health, Orphans and Child Welfare, Water Sanitation & Hygiene, Hunger, Environment
- Headquarters: Nottingham, UK
- Region served: Worldwide
- Key people: Chair of Trustees: Syed Lakhte Hassanain
- Income: £33.3 Million (2024)
- Disbursements: £39.4 Million (2024)
- Expenses: £4.38 Million (2024)
- Website: muslimhands.org.uk

Muslim Hands is an international Non-governmental organization in over fifty two countries worldwide to help those affected by natural disasters, conflict and poverty. The organisation was established in 1993 in Nottingham, UK.

== History ==
Muslim Hands was established in 1993 in response to the crisis in Bosnia at the time. The charity began by sending aid to those in needs in the region.

== Working in emergencies ==
They regularly act on behalf of other UK NGOs to deliver aid supplies to areas where they have an existing field office or volunteers.

They have been present on the ground for widely publicized disasters such as the Asian tsunami of 2004, the Wars in Iraq and Afghanistan and the recent Horn of Africa. They have also been present for crises that have never attracted media attention such as the sub-zero winters in Kashmir, cholera outbreaks in Guinea Bissau and acute droughts in Somalia, Mali and Niger.

== Awards and nominations ==
In January 2013, Muslim Hands was nominated for the Charity of the Year award at the British Muslim Awards.

in 2019, Muslim Hands was awarded the Queen's Award for voluntary service.

== Street Children and Sports ==
Muslim hands, through its project Maidaan, is contributing towards the right to play for more than 1.5 million street children in Pakistan. Their street children football team won the runner up position at Street Child World Cup Russia 2018 and Qatar 2022. Moreover, Muslim Hands Street Children Football Team also won the runner up trophy at Norway Cup 2023 in U-17 category.

== Great Charity Gifts ==
In 2020, Muslim Hands launched a new website dedicated to their Great Charity Gifts service. It allows donors to give a useful item to someone in need, in the name of a loved one.

== Major Giving projects ==
In 2003, Muslim Hands launched a legacy and Wills projects to their Major Giving Projects service. It allows donors to add their plaque details on their tangible projects like Classrooms, Rural Schools, solar wells, water filtration plants, livelihood shops, Eye camps, and personalised feedback reports shared on the completion of the project done for themselves or on behalf of their loved one.
