= Khalid Mahmood (Norwegian politician) =

Norwegian Labour politician

- Born: Khalid Chaudry Mahmood; 12 April 1959 (age 67); Mehta Losar, Punjab, Pakistan
- Education: University of Oslo
- Occupation: Politician

Khalid Chaudry Mahmood (born 12 April 1959) is a Pakistani Norwegian politician for the Labour Party.

Born in Pakistan, he migrated to Norway as a teenager and studied economics at the University of Oslo. Mahmood has also worked as a journalist, author and been on the board of several organisations. In 1983 he was elected to serve in Oslo city council. He was re-elected in 1987, not in 1991 but again in 1995. Having originally represented the Conservative Party, he joined the Labour Party in 1995. He left the Conservative Party in protest against a proposal to introduce financial reports regarding the immigrant population. He was re-elected to the city council in 1999, 2003, 2007 and 2011. In 2011, he was placed on the last spot on the Labour electoral list, but was elected due to getting most personal votes of all candidates. In 2015, he was named the longest sitting city council representative, having been elected for eight periods.

He also served as a deputy representative to the Norwegian Parliament from 2005.

== Islamophobia ==
According to a 2009 BBC article, Mahmood believes that there is persecution against Muslims. In the article, he was quoted: "Muslims are the Jews of our times, stigmatised, generalised and presented as a threat to society. We are portrayed as uncivilised people living double lives - orderly and behaved when in public, but at home fundamentalists suppressing and physically abusing women."
