= Fungal Diversity Survey =

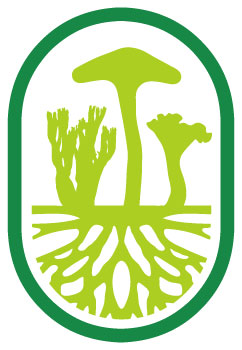
- Logo of Fungal Diversity Survey
- Abbreviation: FunDiS
- Purpose: Citizen science
- Headquarters: Indiana, United States

Fungal Diversity Survey, or FunDiS, is a nonprofit citizen science organization formerly known as North American Mycoflora Project, Inc. FunDiS aims to document the diversity and distribution of fungi across North America “in order to increase awareness of their critical role in the health of ecosystems and allow us to better protect them in a world of rapid climate change and habitat loss.” The project encourages amateurs, working with professionals, to contribute observations to online databases vetted by experts, and to collect and document fungi for DNA barcoding. Fungal Diversity Survey, Inc. is a Charitable 501(c)(3) organization registered in Indiana, United States.

== History ==
FunDiS grew out of an academic initiative to create a modern, comprehensive funga for North America. In 2012, some 70 academic mycologists and scientific-oriented mushroom collectors met at Yale University and called the initiative the North American Mycoflora Project.

In 2017 at a meeting in Athens, Georgia, the project was reframed as a citizen science initiative and subsequently a nonprofit organization, North American Mycoflora Project, Inc. (NAMP) was launched in December 2017. In August 2020 the organization changed its name to Fungal Diversity Survey to reflect the fact that "fungi are their own kingdom - as long as they get lumped in with plants they will not get the recognition, attention and protection they deserve".

== Programs ==
- Fungal Diversity Database – Build a database of fungal observations on iNaturalist of sufficient scale and quality to be useful to scientists studying biodiversity and the effects of climate change and other impacts on distribution. Observations posted to a special iNaturalist project are reviewed first by triagers who give feedback to contributors of low quality observations and then by a team of expert identifiers.
- Rare Fungi Challenges – A Conservation Working Group of experts identifies species of concern and their habitats, develops regional watchlists, and engages amateur citizen scientists to look for and document target specimens.
- Sequencing – make the molecular revolution accessible and affordable to individuals, clubs and organizations. Citizen scientists register projects on the FunDiS website; collect, describe and upload color photographs to iNaturalist or Mushroom Observer; send dried tissue for DNA barcoding; and send dried specimens to curated herbaria or fungaria which in turn send data to the Mycology Collections data Portal (MyCoPortal). DNA barcoding is done by the Barcode of Life Data System, based in Guelph, Ontario, and results are posted to GenBank.

== Articles that mention FunDis / NAMP ==
- Leber, Jessica. Species Sleuths: Amateur Naturalists Spark a New Wave of Discovery. YaleEnvironment360, March 12, 2019
- Thiers, B. M., and R. E. Halling. 2018. The Macrofungi Collection Consortium. Applications in Plant Sciences 6(2): e1021. doi:10.1002/aps3.1021
- LR Mycofloras 28_36.pdf Sheehan, B., 2017. Mushroom citizen science in the USA: From species lists to Mycoflora 2.0. Fungi Magazine, 101, pp.28-36
