= Amer Jamil =

Islamic religious scholar

Shaykh Amer Jamil

Personal life
- Born: 1977 (age 48–49) Glasgow, Scotland
- Citizenship: Scotland
- Era: Modern era
- Education: University of Strathclyde; University of Wales; Abu Noor University (Syria); al-Fath Islamic Law institute (Syria); Dar al-Mustafa Institute (Tarim)
- Occupation: Islamic scholar
- Website: amerjamil.com

Religious life
- Religion: Islam
- Denomination: Sunni
- Founder of: iSyllabus
- Jurisprudence: Hanafi
- Creed: Maturidi

Amer Jamil is an Islamic scholar and co-founder of the Solas Foundation and iSyllabus programme, the latter of which he is currently the Project Director. He holds a (LLB) law degree from the University of Strathclyde and BA (Hons) in Islamic studies from the University of Wales. He was also previously the Muslim Chaplain at Glasgow Caledonian University.

== Education ==
Jamil holds an (LLB) law degree from the University of Strathclyde.

After travelling to France, he travelled to a wide range of Muslim countries seeking sacred knowledge from a wide range of Muslim scholars. He first travelled to Syria, attending the Abu Noor University, founded by Ahmed Kuftaro (1912 - 2004). Whilst in Syria he also attended private classes with scholars from both the Abu Noor University and the al-Fath Islamic Law Institute, where Abd al-Fattah al-Bizm was the leading scholar.

He later travelled to Yemen, where he studied in the Dār al-Mustafa Institute, Tarim under Habib Umar bin Hafiz and Habib Ali al-Jiffri. Whilst there, he studied the science of Tazkiah, religious dialogue and family law, the latter of which is now his primary field of interest. He has studied family law from the perspective of all 4 schools of Sunni; he studied the Maliki and Shafi'i schools of thought in Yemen, and the Hanafi and Hanbali schools of thought in Syria.

== Career ==
Jamil is authorized to teach Islamic sciences include Arabic jurisprudence (Fiqh), principles of law (Usul Al-Fiqh), Qur'anic exegesis (Tafsir), Sufism (Tasawwaf), the life of Muhammad (Seerah), beliefs and doctrine, legal maxims, family law, the science of Hadith terminology, and inheritance law.

He regularly contributes to national newspapers such as the Scotsman, Sunday Herald, and the BBC. He is a frequent contributor to local radio programmes. In 2012, he addressed the Scottish Parliament with a short reminder on the importance of morally righteous behaviour, particularly for those who are in positions of authority. In 2016, he appeared on the Islamic site Seekers Guidance, where he talked about the issue of black magic. In 2017, he appeared on a series of podcasts for the Deenspiration podcast show.

== Work on domestic violence ==
He has spoken against forced marriage in the Asian community, stating "the practice has no place in Islam".

In 2007, he authored the booklet What Islam Really Says About Domestic Abuse. The booklet methodically explains topics such as "The concept of harm in Islam", "The example of the Muhammad" as well as clarifying the often misunderstood verse in the Qur'an about hitting, explaining that domestic violence is irrefutably not allowed in Islam. The work was supported by the Strathclyde Police and Scottish government. It was translated into 5 other languages and 8,000 copies were distributed to various women's groups, social work and the police as well as other relevant organisations.

In 2010, he launched a national campaign on raising awareness and tackling domestic abuse in the Muslim community. In the same year, he co-authored the work, Islam and Domestic Violence: A Commentary with Louise Riley. In 2013, he was asked by the Scottish government to share his views on the proposal put forth to criminalise forced marriage. In the same year, the Assistant Chief Constable, Iain Livingstone, invited him to speak at a conference regarding honour-based violence.

Jamil is also the leader of Unity Family Services, a Glasgow based charity that focuses on family support and guidance in the Muslim population. Its primary aims are to prevent and tackle forced marriages and domestic abuse, as well as solving wider societal family issues and providing support for social workers on how to engage with Muslim clients.

He also signed his name alongside over 30 religious leaders across Scotland, voicing his rejection of forced marriage in Islam. The campaign was backed by the Scottish government and The West of Scotland Religious Equality Council. He is currently conducting PhD research on the relationship between Islamic family law and Scots family law.

== Literary works ==
- What Islam Really Says About Domestic Abuse
- Islam and Domestic Violence: A Commentary
- Reminder (leaflet)

== Awards ==
List of Awards Amer Jamil has been nominated for
Award	Year	Result
British Muslim Awards - "Religious Advocate of the Year"	2014	Won
British Muslim Awards - "Religious Advocate of the Year"	2017	Nominated
