= Death of Abbas Khan =

Abbas Khan
- Born: May 19, 1981; London, United Kingdom
- Died: 16 December 2013 (aged 31–32); Damascus, Syria
- Cause of death: Suspicious circumstances (claimed suicide, disputed)
- Education: Royal National Orthopaedic Hospital, London
- Occupation: Orthopaedic surgeon
- Known for: Humanitarian work in Syria, Death in Syrian custody
- Notable work: Treating civilians during the Syrian Civil War
- Spouse: None
- Children: 2
- Parent(s): Fatima Khan (Mother), Unknown Father
- Awards: None (posthumous recognition for humanitarian work)
- Website: www.bbc.co.uk/news/uk-25527168

Abbas Khan, a father of two, was a British orthopaedic surgeon who was killed at age 32 on 16 December 2013 while imprisoned by the Syrian government. The Syrian government claim that Khan committed suicide but this is disputed. The British Foreign Office say that Khan was "effectively murdered".

In November 2012, Abbas Khan had gone to Turkey to help refugees from Syria during the civil war, but, after two weeks, he crossed the border into Syria to help those unable to reach the border between the two countries. Khan was arrested in Aleppo, 48 hours after entering Syria. When Khan's younger sister, Sara, found out that her brother was missing, the family contacted the Foreign Office, hoping for help in finding him, but the FCO did nothing. Eventually, his mother, Fatima Khan, found Abbas in a prison in Damascus through unofficial help given by the Indian and Russian embassies eight months later. When she found him, his weight had dropped to less than 32 kg (71 lb), and he could hardly walk. She also described seeing a missing fingernail and burned feet: signs of torture familiar to Syrians. He told her that he had been tortured and held for eight months in an underground cell.

Khan told his family that he was accused of treating dying civilians (women and children), which had been classed as an act of terrorism. Khan worked as a specialist registrar in orthopaedic surgery at the Royal National Orthopaedic Hospital. The Foreign Office said it was "extremely concerned" by reports. In December 2013, the ICRC transported his body from Damascus to Beirut, then back to London.

In July 2014, two men who had been imprisoned with Khan in Damascus told the BBC that he had given treatment to other prisoners in jail, and taught them English, and had been positive and strong. He had ultimately been taken away by Intelligence Services, and the men said they believed he was killed because of what he had witnessed: "Abbas saw everything. They killed him for the things he saw. They didn't want anyone to know."

On 27 October 2014, a jury in London found that the Syrian government “deliberately and intentionally killed” Khan.
