= National Association of Muslim Police =

British organisation

- Founded: 2007
- Type: Organization
- Purpose: Support for Muslim police officers and staff, promoting an understanding and awareness of Islam within the police service and the wider community, influencing national policies within the police service, addressing disproportionality within misconduct and grievance procedures, enhancing community cohesion and safety
- Location: United Kingdom
- Members: 2,000+
- Official language: English
- Chair: Alex Gent (2020 - present)
- Website: https://muslim.police.uk/

The National Association of Muslim Police (NAMP) is a British organisation for Muslim police officers. It represents more than 2,000 members and was founded in 2007.

- The National Association of Muslim Police (NAMP) is a British organisation for Muslim police officers & staff.
- To provide support to localised associations.
- Improving recruitment, retention and progression of Muslim officers and staff.
- Addressing disproportionality within misconduct and grievance procedures.
- To promote an understanding and awareness of Islam within the police service and the wider community
- To influence the direction of national policies within the Police Service.
- To promote community cohesion and enhance the safety of our communities.

The current chair is Alex Gent (2020-present). The previous chair was Mustafa Mohammed (2016–2020)

== Islamophobia ==
The top priority for NAMP is to tackle Islamophobia both internally within the police and externally within the community. A survey conducted by NAMP in 2020 showed that one of the biggest barriers for Muslims applying for the police is fear of institutional racism and Islamophobia.

== Counter Terrorism (CT) Terminology ==
NAMP originally raised the issue about CT terminology in a paper submitted to the Home Affairs Select Committee in October 2019. This was followed by paper submitted to the Counter Terrorism Advisory Group, which proposed a change in terminology. Later that year in 2020 a survey was conducted by NAMP over members of the association and Muslims within the community. The survey highlighted that words such as "Islamism" and "Jihadism" link Islam itself to extremism, therefore stigmatising a whole religion and followers of it. The majority of respondents felt vulnerable when these terms are used. NAMP believes the use of such terminology creates negative perceptions of the general Muslim population, and contributes towards Islamophobic attitudes and an increase in hate crime. NAMP are seeking change this terminology and have made recommendations to the National Police Chief Council and the Independent Prevent Review.
