= United Mission for Relief & Development =

US-based nonprofit organization

- Formation: January 2010; 16 years ago
- Type: International NGO
- Purpose: Relief and Development
- Headquarters: Virginia, US
- Region served: Worldwide
- Field: Humanitarianism
- Website: umrelief.org

United Mission for Relief and Development, formerly United Muslim Relief, and abbreviated as UMR, is an international nonprofit organization that specializes in human and recovery services.

UMR was first created by a student body in George Mason University in response to the 2010 Haiti earthquake and was the first international nonprofit organization to enter Libya with a medical convoy when the 2011 Libyan civil war began.

UMR is a registered 501(c)(3) non-profit organization that provides livelihood and disaster relief and recovery services to the underserved, specializing in the Health, WASH (Water, Sanitation and Hygiene) and Child Protection sectors. Their mission is to provide agile and sustainable development in the face of emergencies and rapid socioeconomic and political change.

UMR believes the greatest asset of any community is the people who call it home. Therefore any approach they implement involves a wide network of community partners that consist of community authorities and other NGOs in the places they aim to serve. UMR is able to alter its model to meet the needs of diverse and variegated populations. This includes contributing gift in kind hospital equipment to under resourced medical facilities in Gaza, Sudan, Somalia, Yemen, among many others. UMR is also a strong contributor to the field of public and mental health through cross sectoral programs that intersect with gender based violence prevention, emergency response, and education. They also provide psycho-social support to Syrian refugees to ease their integration into their host communities of Jordan and cataract surgeries to remote communities in Kenya and Jordan.
