= Matrimonial website =

Websites for matchmaking for marriage

Matrimonial websites or marriage websites or matrimonial apps or marriage apps are websites that allow users to meet individuals to establish a relationship that leads to marriage. Matrimonial websites contrast with dating websites in that matrimonial websites have marriage as the goal of the meeting of two persons, rather than short-term or casual relationships.

== Usage ==
Matrimonial sites register users, after which they are able to upload their profiles onto a searchable database maintained by the website. Those users looking to find suitors search the database with customized searches that typically include nationality, age, gender, religion, and geographic location, as well as the availability of photographs.

In addition to being popular in Eastern Europe (particularly Russia and Ukraine), matrimonial sites are popular in South Asia (India, Pakistan and Bangladesh) and among South Asians settled overseas. According to the Associated Chambers of Commerce and Industry in India, the online matrimony business is expected to be a $250 Million business by 2017. According to The New York Times, there are over 1500 matrimonial websites in India. Matrimonial websites have been used often by men in the West for the purposes of marriage tourism, and by people in Eastern Europe and South Asia for the purpose of finding a spouse overseas.

== Criticism ==
There have been reports of abuse of information obtained from matrimonial websites.

== See also ==
- Arranged marriage
- Matchmaking
- Online dating service
- Dating agency
