= Mushroom Observer =

Mycology website

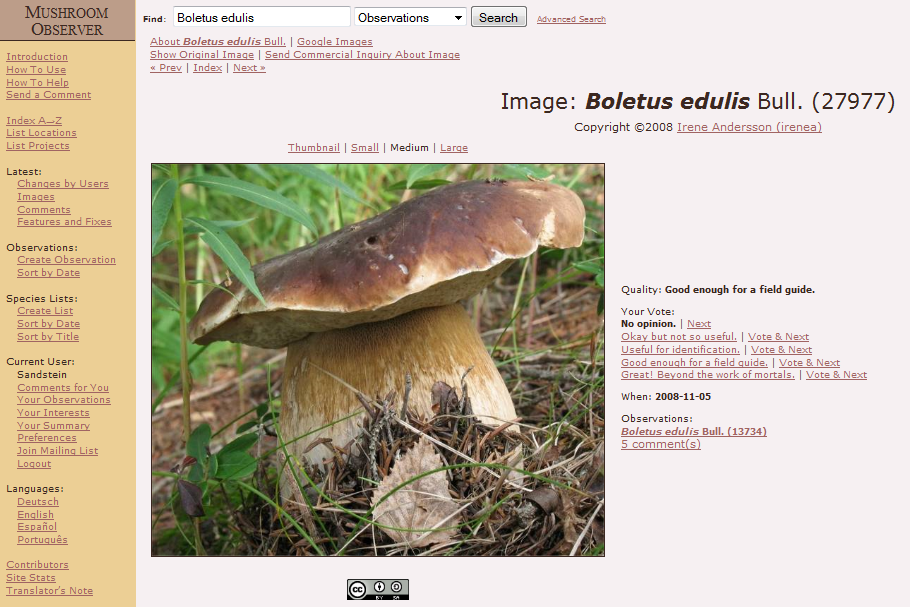
- Photograph of a Boletus edulis observation recorded on Mushroom Observer
- Available in: English, French, German, Greek, Italian, Polish, Portuguese, Russian and Spanish
- Owners: Mushroom Observer, Inc.
- Website: https://mushroomobserver.org
- Registration: Optional (for viewing), Required (for voting and commenting and creating observations)
- Launched: 2006
- Content license: Creative Commons Attribution/Share-Alike with or without "Noncommercial" restriction

Mushroom Observer is a collaborative mycology website started by Nathan Wilson in 2006. Its purpose is to "record observations about mushrooms, help people identify mushrooms they aren't familiar with, and expand the community around the scientific exploration of mushrooms".

The community of about 12,000 contributing users collaborates on identifying the submitted mushroom images, assigning their scientific names by means of a weighted voting process.

All photographs are subject to a Creative Commons license that allows their reuse by others without the need for remuneration or special permission, subject to the terms of the license. The software is open source and hosted on GitHub.

== Growth ==
As of 2024, the website contains about half a million user-submitted mushroom observations illustrated by more 1.6 million photographs of nearly 20,000 species of fungi. In 2010, the website contained about 53,000 user-submitted mushroom observations illustrated by 101,000 photographs; up from 7,250 observations and 12,800 photographs in 2008.
