= Hany Abdel Gawad El-Banna =

Aid agency founder

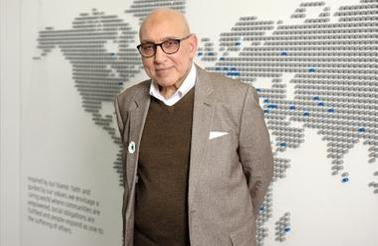
Dr Hany El-Banna OBE

Hany Abdel Gawad El-Banna OBE (born 9 December 1950) is the co-founder of Islamic Relief, an international Muslim relief and development NGO established in 1984 in Birmingham, United Kingdom.

== Early life and education ==
Born in Egypt, El-Banna completed his MBBCh Medicine at Al Azhar University, Cairo, where he also obtained a Diploma in Islamic Studies in 1976. El-Banna was awarded the Hamilton Bailey Prize in Medicine at City hospital (previously known as Dudley Road) in 1981, Birmingham UK. He then went on to further his medical training and completed a Doctorate of Medicine (MD) in foetal pathology from the University of Birmingham Medical School in 1991.

== Islamic Relief ==
In 1983, El-Banna attended a medical conference in Sudan during a time of famine in the region. The poverty and desperation he witnessed compelled him to return to the UK and raise funds from family to aid relief efforts.

This led to the foundation of Islamic Relief in January 1984 as an organisation to help people in need. Over the following 24 years, Dr El-Banna visited over 70 countries as part of his role leading Islamic Relief. He permanently left medicine to dedicate all his time to Islamic Relief in 1995.

During his time at the organisation Dr El-Banna worked on raising funds and advocating hundreds of humanitarian causes including for the victims of the genocide in Bosnia, floods and earthquakes in Pakistan and Bangladesh and the Indian Ocean tsunami in 2004.

Additionally, Dr El-Banna oversaw the first government funding for a Muslim faith-based organisation and the inclusion of the organisation to the Disasters Emergency Committee, to date the only Muslim organisation to be a member.

== Muslim Charities Forum and The World Humanitarian Action Forum ==
Since leaving Islamic Relief in 2008, Dr El-Banna continued to be involved in the aid sector founding new vehicles through which to foster a collaborative approach. The World Humanitarian Action Forum seeks to foster partnerships and closer co-operation among the humanitarian and charitable organisations from Muslim countries and their Western counterparts. Dr El-Banna has visited over 60 countries on behalf of these organisations.

Between 2007 and 2022 Dr El-Banna also served as chairman of the Muslim Charities Forum (MCF) a registered charity that aims to improve British Muslim charities' contribution to international development by promoting the exchange of experience, ideas and information amongst the members, between networks of NGOs in the UK and internationally, with governments, and other bodies with the interest in international development.

== Awards ==
Dr El-Banna was appointed an Officer of the Order of the British Empire (OBE) by Queen Elizabeth II in the 2004 New Year Honours; in the same year he received Ibn Khaldun Award at the Muslim News Awards for Excellence in Promoting Understanding between Global Cultures and Faiths within the UK. In 2007 the University of Birmingham has awarded him an honorary doctorate.

In 2020, he received the Ubuntu Award in South Africa celebrating excellence in diplomacy and social responsibility. In 2023, Dr El-Banna was awarded the Daniel Phelan Lifetime Achievement Award by Civil Society in the UK for 40 years of leadership in the humanitarian sector. In 2024, Dr El-Banna was awarded the Lord Mayor of Birmingham’s Award for his exceptional service to the city of Birmingham.
