= List of British Pakistanis =

The following is a list of notable British Pakistanis, namely notable citizens or residents of the United Kingdom whose ethnic origins lie in Pakistan:

== Academia and education ==
=== Humanities ===
- Sara Ahmed – professor of Race and Cultural Studies at Goldsmiths, University of London and academic working at the intersection of feminist theory, queer theory, critical race theory and postcolonialism
- Shabbir Akhtar – philosopher
- Tariq Ali – academic, historian and novelist
- Khizar Humayun Ansari OBE – director of the Centre for Minority Studies at the University of London, known for his work in the field of race and ethnic relations
- Sarah Ansari – professor of history at Royal Holloway, University of London
- Akil Awan – British academic and the current RCUK Fellow at the Royal Holloway, University of London
- Yasmin Khan – historian of British India and associate professor of history at the University of Oxford
- Ziauddin Sardar – scholar, writer and cultural critic
- Mona Siddiqui – professor of Islamic Studies and Public Understanding at the University of Glasgow, as well a regular contributor to BBC Radio 4's The Moral Maze, The Times, The Scotsman, The Guardian and The Herald

=== Natural sciences ===
- Haroon Ahmed – professor emeritus of Microelectronics at the Cavendish Laboratory, the Physics Department of the University of Cambridge
- Saiful Islam – professor of Materials Chemistry at the University of Bath and a recipient of the Royal Society Wolfson Research Merit award
- Syma Khalid – biophysicist who is a professor of Computational Biophysics in Chemistry at the University of Southampton.
- Ehsan Masood – science writer, journalist and broadcaster; editor of Research Fortnight and Research Europe; teaches International Science Policy at Imperial College London
- Azra Meadows OBE – honorary lecturer in the Institute of Biomedical and Life Sciences at the University of Glasgow
- Jawed Siddiqi – professor emeritus of software engineering at Sheffield Hallam University and political activist
- Ghayasuddin Siddiqui – academic and political activist

=== Social sciences ===
- Hamza Alavi – Marxist academic sociologist and activist
- Muhammad Anwar – University of Warwick sociologist
- Tariq Modood – professor of sociology, politics and public policy at the University of Bristol

=== University leadership and executives ===
- Nazir Afzal – former Chief Crown Prosecutor for North West England; Chancellor of the University of Manchester, began his term in 2022 as the highest ranked Pashtun at any Russell Group institution
- Aneez Esmail – retired Associate Vice-president at the University of Manchester; formerly based at Institute of Population Health belonging to the Faculty of Medical and Human Sciences; held a visiting professorship at Harvard University in the US
- Sayeeda Warsi – former Chairman of the Conservative Party and now Deputy-Chancellor of the University of Bolton

== Business and finance ==
=== FTSE 100 and multinational corporations ===
- Javed Ahmed – Former Chief Executive of Tate & Lyle PLC from 2009 to 2018, a FTSE 100 company which is one of Britain's oldest brands
- Mohammed Amin MBE – Retired partner at PricewaterhouseCoopers UK; Chairman of the Conservative Muslim Forum, Amin joined the Liberal Democrats after the promotion of Boris Johnson
- Salman Amin – Former Chief Executive Officer of Turkish owned Pladis; group owner of Godiva premium chocolate and McVities biscuits
- Zameer Choudrey, Baron Choudrey CBE – Chief Executive of Bestway Group; second richest Pakistani and the largest family-owned business in the United Kingdom
- Naguib Kheraj CBE – Former Vice-chairman of Barclays Bank PLC; former boss of JP Morgan Cazenove; his philanthropic interests have made him Chairman of the Aga Khan Foundation based in Karachi Pakistan
- Sir Anwar Pervez OBE – Rawalpindi-born businessman founder of the Bestway Group; one of the largest financial backers to the UK Conservative Party; lives in Beaconsfield, Buckinghamshire
- Saif Malik – CEO, UK and Regional Head, Client Coverage, UK & Europe at Standard Chartered.
- Aki Hussain - Chief Executive Officer of Hiscox plc
- Ben Habib - businessman (commercial property investment executive; First Property Group CEO), and leader of Advance UK.
- Syed Salim Raza - banker and financial executive; former central bank governor.
- Aamer Sarfraz, Baron Sarfraz- businessman (private equity / agri-tech founder), in addition to political role

=== Small and medium-sized enterprises ===
- Mumtaz Khan Akbar – founder and owner of the Mumtaz brand
- Amjad Ali – co-founder of fast food chain Dixy Chicken
- Ruzwana Bashir – British businesswoman, former Oxford Union President and founder and CEO of Peek.com, travel company based in San Francisco, California
- James Caan CBE (Nazim Khan) – businessman and entrepreneur; formerly a part of Dragons' Den
- Mo Chaudry – born in Pakistan, raised in England; became a millionaire businessman in the West Midlands
- Humayon Dar – advocate of Islamic banking and finance; founder of the Global Islamic Finance Awards
- Afzal Kahn – Bradford-based entrepreneur, owns a specialist car design company; in 2008 he broke records by paying £440,000 for a distinctive 'F1' number plate; has previously shown an interest in purchasing Newcastle United F.C.
- Mohammed Khalid – founder and Chairman of the successful fast food chain Chicken Cottage
- Zarine Kharas – co-founder and CEO of JustGiving
- Abid Mehmood – co-founder of fast food chain Dixy Chicken
- Amar Latif – Scottish entrepreneur, television personality and professional traveller
- Tahir Mohsan – founder of Time Computers, Supanet, and Tpad; currently manages several investment companies from his base in Dubai
- Aneel Mussarat – property millionaire; his company, MCR Property Group, specialises in renting apartments to university students in Manchester and Liverpool
- Tarak Ramzan – founder and CEO of the Quiz womenswear retail chain
- Asim Siddiqui – chairman and a founding trustee of The City Circle
- Adeem Younis – founder and CEO of SingleMuslim.com and Penny Appeal
- Mohammad Zahoor – Ukraine-based British-Pakistani businessman and philanthropist.
- Munir Hussain – founder of Pepe's Piri Piri.
- Frank Khalid — entrepreneur (cash & carry, hospitality, film studios
- Suleman Raza — restaurateur and food entrepreneur (Spice Village group)
- Tariq Sheikh (businessman) — founder of Tariq Halal Meat (national halal food supply business)
- Sonya Barlow — technology and careers-network entrepreneur (LMF Network founder/CEO)
- Omar Mansoor — fashion designer and label founder (international couture business)
- Abbas Gokal — shipping businessman (historically notable UK-linked Pakistani business figure)

== Entertainment ==
- Asad Shan – actor and TV presenter B4U music & Zing TV. Won the title of Mr Asia UK and started in 4 feature. Directed 7 Welcome to London
- Abdullah Afzal – actor and stand-up comedian
- Riz Ahmed – British actor, best known for his role in films such as Four Lions, Nightcrawler, Rogue One, and Venom, as well as in the HBO miniseries The Night Of
- Mina Anwar – British actress, best known for playing Police Constable Maggie Habib in the sitcom The Thin Blue Line
- Humza Arshad – actor and comedian; the producer of the YouTube series Diary of a Bad Man
- Sadia Azmat – stand-up comedian
- Shabana Bakhsh – actress who has appeared in soaps such as River City and Doctors
- Babar Bhatti – actor known for the part of Punkah Wallah Rumzan in the BBC sitcom It Ain't Half Hot Mum
- Jamil Dehlavi – London-based independent film director and producer of Pakistani-French origin
- Dynamo – born Steven Frayne; popular magician; Pakistani father and English mother
- Tan France – fashion designer, television personality, and author He is currently the fashion expert for the Netflix series Queer Eye.
- Ahmad Hussain – singer-songwriter, executive, producer and founder and managing director of IQRA Promotions
- Moin Hussain – filmmaker
- Aziz Ibrahim – musician best known for his work as guitarist with Simply Red, The Stone Roses (post-John Squire)
- Naz Ikramullah – British-Canadian artist and film producer; of Pakistani origin
- Tez Ilyas – stand-up comedian of Pakistani descent
- Jameela Jamil – actress, radio presenter and activist
- Sarah Joyce – better known by her stage name, 'Rumer'; Pakistani-born British singer–songwriter
- Mimi Keene – actress
- Annie Khalid – English-Pakistani musician and model
- Abid Khan – director
- Ahsan Khan – film and television actor, host and performer
- Alyy Khan – film and television actor and host
- Aqib Khan – actor who played Sajid Khan in the movie West is West
- Armeena Rana Khan – Canadian born Pakistani-British film and television actress and model, known for her work in the Pakistani entertainment industry
- Guz Khan – comedian and actor
- Natasha Khan – known by her stage name, 'Bat for Lashes'; half Pakistani half English singer-songwriter and multi-instrumentalist
- Sair Khan – Coronation Street actress of Pakistani descent
- Saira Khan – runner-up on the first series of The Apprentice; TV presenter on BBC's Temper Your Temper and Desi DNA
- Shahid Khan – known as 'Naughty Boy'; British-born Pakistani songwriter, record producer and musician
- Ayub Khan Din – actor and playwright, known for writing the film East Is East
- Zack Knight – Punjabi singer, songwriter and performer
- Art Malik – Pakistani-born British actor who achieved international fame in the 1980s through his starring and subsidiary roles in assorted British and Merchant-Ivory television serials and films
- Zayn Malik – former member of the British-Irish boyband One Direction from Bradford, whose father is from Pakistan; his mother is mixed British and Irish
- Nadia Manzoor – writer, performer, and producer based in Brooklyn, New York.
- Jeff Mirza – stand-up comedian and actor
- Shazia Mirza – comedian from Birmingham, England, whose act revolves around her Muslim faith
- Suleman Mirza – lead dancer of dance group Signature; runner-up on Britain's Got Talent 2008
- Zia Mohyeddin – Pakistani actor, narrator, producer, director and television broadcaster who has appeared in both Pakistani and British cinema throughout his career
- Mazhar Munir – television and film actor; before co-starring in the 2005 movie Syriana, he appeared in three British television shows: The Bill, Mile High, and Doctors
- Murtz – television and radio presenter
- Aki Nawaz – British singer and musician; part of the band Fun-Da-Mental
- Adil Omar – British-born Pakistani recording artist
- Adil Ray – presenter, better known as the creator of BBC South Asian Muslim comedy Citizen Khan in which he also portrays the protagonist
- Sakina Samo – award-winning actress, producer and director
- Kiran Sonia Sawar – Scottish actress best known for her role in the one-off drama Murdered by My Father
- Nadine Shah – singer-songwriter and musician
- Jay Shareef – award-winning stand-up comedian and broadcaster
- Rani Taj – dhol player dubbed 'Dhol Queen' after her YouTube video went viral
- Badi Uzzaman – television and film actor
- Atta Yaqub – actor and model
- Laila Zaidi – actress
- Mikaal Zulfiqar – British born Pakistani actor and model
- Mawaan Rizwan – British actor, writer and comedian
- Asim Chaudhry – British comedian, writer, director and actor
- Tahirah Sharif – British actress
- Shazad Latif - British actor

== Journalism and media ==
- Ali Abbasi – former Scottish TV presenter
- Kamran Abbasi – doctor, medical editor, and cricket writer; currently editor of the Journal of the Royal Society of Medicine; former acting editor of British Medical Journal and editor of the bulletin of the World Health Organization
- Asad Ahmad – BBC journalist and news presenter
- Tazeen Ahmad – was a reporter for both American television news and British TV.
- Arif Ali – regional product director for the Associated Press news agency in Europe, Middle East and Africa
- Yasmin Alibhai-Brown – journalist and author born in Uganda, currently columnist for The Independent and the Evening Standard
- Martin Bashir – British journalist of Pakistani descent, currently with ABC's 20/20
- Hassan Ghani – Scottish broadcast journalist and documentary filmmaker, based in London
- Mishal Husain – anchor for BBC World
- Faris Kermani – film director based in the UK, now head of Crescent Films, production company based in London
- Secunder Kermani – journalist who is Foreign Correspondent for Channel 4 News. He was previously a reporter on the BBC's flagship current affairs programme Newsnight.
- Reham Khan – journalist and anchor currently working at Dawn News
- Rizwan Khan – works for Al Jazeera English; has his own show called Riz Khan
- Mazher Mahmood (also known as the Fake Sheikh) – often dubbed as "Britain's most notorious undercover reporter"; in a GQ survey was voted as the 45th most powerful man in Britain, ahead of Prince William; the News of the World paid his six-figure salary
- Javed Malik – television anchor; publisher of the UAE's first diplomatic magazine, The International Diplomat; executive director of the World Forum; served as Pakistan's Ambassador at Large and Special Advisor to the Prime Minister
- Sarfraz Manzoor – Pakistani-born British writer, journalist, documentary maker, and broadcaster; writes regularly for The Guardian; presents documentaries on BBC Radio 4
- Aasmah Mir – BBC presenter and former columnist for the Sunday Herald
- Nazia Mogra – television journalist for BBC North West Tonight News on BBC One
- Jason Mohammad – radio and television presenter
- Saima Mohsin – British journalist
- Shereen Nanjiani – radio journalist with BBC Radio Scotland
- Adnan Nawaz – news and sports presenter working for the BBC World Service
- Zarqa Nawaz – freelance writer, journalist, broadcaster, and filmmaker
- Asad Qureshi – filmmaker who was kidnapped on 26 March 2010 by a militant group called the "Asian Tigers" in Pakistan's Federally Administered Tribal Areas
- Osama Saeed – head of International and Media Relations at the Al Jazeera Media Network
- Aisha Ghazi – independent documentary filmmaker, lawyer and human rights activist.
- Mehreen Khan - British journalist, and economics editor at The Times

== Law and justice ==
- Nazir Afzal – Chief Crown Prosecutor for North West England, who initiated prosecutions in the case of the Rochdale sex trafficking gang
- Aamer Anwar – Glaswegian solicitor; named as Criminal Lawyer of the Year by the Law Awards of Scotland in 2005 and 2006
- Tan Ikram – Deputy Senior District Judge (MC) of England & Wales based at Westminster Magistrates' Court; Associate Judge, SBA, Cyprus; holds honorary doctorates in laws (LLD) from the University of West London and the University of Wolverhampton; Contributing Editor, Archbold Magistrates Criminal Courts Practice 2020
- Javed Khan – Chief Executive of Barnardo's, former Chief Executive of the British charity Victim Support; of Kashmiri origin; member of the Whitehall Social Policy Forum; an adviser to the Goldman Sachs Global Leaders Programme
- Karim Ahmad Khan – lawyer and chief International Criminal Court prosecutor
- Khawar Qureshi QC – barrister and international lawyer.

== Literature and art ==
- Tariq Ali – historian and novelist
- Moniza Alvi – poet and writer
- Rasheed Araeen – London-based conceptual artist, sculptor, painter, writer, and curator
- Nadeem Aslam – novelist
- Nasser Azam – contemporary artist, living and working in London
- Shezad Dawood – artist based in London
- Imtiaz Dharker – poet and documentary filmmaker
- Roopa Farooki – novelist born in Lahore, Pakistan
- Mohsin Hamid – Pakistani writer of novels Moth Smoke (2000), The Reluctant Fundamentalist (2007), and How to Get Filthy Rich in Rising Asia (2013)
- Sairish Hussain – novelist and lecturer
- Aamer Hussein – short story writer and critic
- Zahid Hussain – novelist, poet and screenwriter
- Razia Iqbal – arts correspondent for the BBC; born in East Africa and is of Muslim Punjabi origin
- Idris Khan – artist based in London
- Shamshad Khan – Manchester-based poet born in Leeds; worked as an editor on an anthology of black women's poetry and advised the Arts Council of England North West
- Vaseem Khan – writer, author of the Baby Ganesh Detective Agency novels
- Hanif Kureishi – playwright, screenwriter and filmmaker, novelist and short story writer
- Omar Mansoor – London-based fashion designer, best known for his couture occasionwear
- Emran Mian – author and policy advisor at Whitehall
- Suhayl Saadi – literary and erotic novelist; radio and stage playwright
- Ziauddin Sardar – scholar, writer and cultural critic
- Qaisra Shahraz – novelist, journalist, Fellow of the Royal Society of Arts and a director of Gatehouse Books
- Anwar Sheikh – Pakistani-born British author; lives in Cardiff, Wales

== Architecture ==
- Saira Hussain – Lancashire-based and Huddersfield University educated; named most influential woman in UK Architecture 2017

== Civil service, military and police ==
- Tarique Ghaffur – high-ranking British police officer in London's Metropolitan Police Service; Assistant Commissioner–Central Operations
- Amjad Hussain – senior Royal Navy officer; highest-ranking member of the British Armed Forces from an ethnic minority
- Sajid Javid – Rochdale-born; former Home Secretary; included in The Times' list of "Top 100 Global People to Watch in 2012", and in The Daily Telegraph's list of "Top 100 most influential figures from the Right"
- Muhammed Akbar Khan – British recruit in the First World War and an officer in the Second World War; first Muslim to become a general in the British Army
- Emran Mian – previously lived in Islamabad; later completed his PhD at Corpus Christi College, Cambridge; Policy Advisor at Whitehall and the Cabinet Office; won a 2014 UK Civil Servant of the Year Award

== Politics ==
=== Members of Parliament ===
- Imran Ahmad Khan – former Conservative Party Member of Parliament (MP) for Wakefield, president of the Transnational Crisis Project; convicted child sex offender, contrary to section 3 of the Sexual Offences Act 2003.
- Zubir Ahmed - Labour MP for Glasgow South West
- Tasmina Ahmed-Sheikh – former Scottish National Party MP for Ochil and South Perthshire
- Tahir Ali – MP representing Birmingham Hall Green for the Labour Party
- Rosena Allin-Khan – Labour MP for Tooting
- Saqib Bhatti – Conservative MP for Meriden, first elected in the 2019 United Kingdom general election.
- Rehman Chishti – former Conservative MP for Gillingham and Rainham
- Nus Ghani – Conservative MP for Wealden
- Adnan Hussain - Independent MP for Blackburn
- Imran Hussain – Labour MP for Bradford East and Shadow Minister for International Development
- Sajid Javid – Conservative MP for Bromsgrove
- Afzal Khan – Labour MP for Manchester Gorton solicitor and former Labour MEP for North West region; first Asian Lord Mayor of Manchester;
- Ayoub Khan - Independent MP for Birmingham Perry Barr
- Naushabah Khan - Labour MP for Gillingham and Rainham
- Sadiq Khan – Mayor of London, former Labour MP for Tooting and Shadow Secretary of State for Justice and Shadow Lord Chancellor
- Khalid Mahmood – former Labour MP for Birmingham Perry Barr
- Shabana Mahmood – Labour MP for Birmingham Ladywood
- Shahid Malik – former Labour MP for Dewsbury; served as a Minister for International Development in Gordon Brown's government
- Anum Qaisar-Javed – former Scottish National Party MP for Airdrie and Shotts
- Yasmin Qureshi – Labour MP for Bolton South East
- Faisal Rashid – former Labour MP for Warrington South, elected in 2017. He was the Mayor of Warrington in 2016.
- Naz Shah – Labour MP for the constituency of Bradford West
- Zarah Sultana – Labour Party MP for Coventry South
- Mohammad Yasin – Labour MP for Bedford, elected in 2017

=== Peers ===
- Shaffaq Mohammed MBE, Baron Mohammed of Tinsley
- Nazir Ahmed, Baron Ahmed – Unaffiliated peer in the House of Lords, formerly Labour now retired.
- Zameer Choudrey, Baron Choudrey CBE – Conservative life peer, businessman
- Kishwer Falkner, Baroness Falkner of Margravine – Lead Liberal Democrat Spokesperson for Foreign Affairs in the House of Lords
- Shaista Gohir, Baroness Gohir OBE – Crossbench life peer
- Wajid Khan, Baron Khan – Labour Baron of Burnley
- Zahida Manzoor, Baroness Manzoor – Liberal Democrat Baroness; former Legal Services Ombudsman; former Deputy Chair of the Commission for Racial Equality
- Nosheena Mobarik, Baroness Mobarik – Conservative Baroness of Mearns in the County of Renfrewshire; former Chairman of CBI Scotland
- Michael Nazir-Ali – now retired Bishop in the House of Lords
- Qurban, Lord Hussain – Life peer
- Aamer Sarfraz, Baron Sarfraz – former Conservative party treasurer
- Shas Sheehan, Baroness Sheehan – Liberal Democrat and Baroness of Wimbledon in the London Borough of Merton and of Tooting in the London Borough of Wandsworth
- Mohamed Sheikh, Baron Sheikh – Baron of Cornhill and Chairman of Conservative Muslim Forum
- Sayeeda Hussain, Baroness Warsi – Conservative minister without portfolio and a former member of the Cabinet

=== Members of Scottish Parliament ===
- Bashir Ahmad – former SNP Member of the Scottish Parliament
- Hanzala Malik – Scottish Labour Party member of the Scottish Parliament for Glasgow, elected in 2011
- Anas Sarwar – former Leader of the Scottish Labour Party
- Kaukab Stewart – SNP MSP for Glasgow Kelvin.
- Humza Yousaf – SNP MSP for Glasgow Pollok, First Minister of Scotland and former Justice Secretary (2018 to 2021)

=== Members of the Senedd ===
- Mohammad Asghar – Welsh politician, representing Plaid Cymru and Welsh Conservatives. First ethnic minority member elected to the Senedd
- Natasha Asghar – Welsh politician, representing the Welsh Conservatives. First female ethnic minority member elected to the Senedd

=== Members of the London Assembly ===
- Hina Bokhari – Liberal Democrat AM
- Sakina Sheikh – Labour AM

=== Mayors ===
- Munir Ahmed – Mayor of the London Borough of Ealing 2021-22
- Yasmine Dar – Lord Mayor of Manchester; first Asian Woman to be Lord Mayor.
- Shiraz Mirza – Honorary Alderman and First Asian Mayor of the Royal Borough of Kingston upon Thames in 2000 and again in 2007. Shiraz Mirza also served as the Assistant Police and Crime Commissioner for Surrey Police.
- Rokhsana Fiaz – Labour Party politician serving as Mayor of Newham
- Sadiq Khan – elected Mayor of London in May 2016
- Chauhdry Abdul Rashid – former Lord Mayor of Birmingham

=== Others in politics ===
- Amjad Bashir – former Conservative Member of the European Parliament (MEP) for Yorkshire and the Humber; former UKIP Small & Medium Business spokesman
- Benyamin Habib – Brexit Party MEP for London from 2019 to 2020.
- Sajjad Karim – former Conservative MEP; born in Brierfield, Lancashire; qualified as a solicitor and started a number of successful lawyers' practices before being elected as a Member of the European Parliament in 2007; Conservative Legal Affairs Spokesman; sits on the Industry, Research and Energy Committee
- Bashir Khanbhai – former Conservative MEP for East of England
- Mushtaq Ahmad – Lord Lieutenant of Lanarkshire. He was the first Asian to serve as Provost of a Scottish council
- Shahnaz Ali – British Muslim woman best known for her leadership role in equality, inclusion and human rights in the National Health Service and local government in England
- Bashir Maan – Pakistani-Scottish politician, businessman and writer
- Munira Mirza – was the Deputy Mayor for Education and Culture of London. Born in Oldham.
- Salma Yaqoob – vice-chair of the Respect Party; Birmingham City Councillor
- Zulfi Bukhari – Minister of State for Overseas Pakistanis & Human Resource Development and Special Assistant to Prime Minister Imran Khan.

== International governmental organizations ==
- Aga Khan III – Karachi-born and Cambridge University educated. Khan III served as the President of the League of Nations from 1937 to 1938.
- Lina Khan – legal scholar and chairwoman of the Federal Trade Commission

== Religion ==
- Sohaib Saeed, Islamic scholar, academic and imam based in Scotland
- Michael Nazir-Ali – 106th Bishop of Rochester in the Church of England; holds dual Pakistani and British citizenship. Became Roman Catholic in 2021.
- Musharraf Hussain – scientist, educator and religious scholar in Nottinghamshire
- Faiz-ul-Aqtab Siddiqi – scholar and principal of the Hijaz College
- Saleem Sidwai – accountant and Secretary General of the Muslim Council of Wales
- Syed Muhammad Faisal Sami - Islamic Scholar and British-Pakistani Humanitarian based in Birmingham
- Shakeel Begg - Imam at Lewisham Mosque

== Science and medicine ==
- Farah Bhatti OBE - Cardiac Surgeon and President of the British Medical Association (BMA)
- Zafar Iqbal - Physician and Former Head of Sports Medicine at Arsenal F.C.
- Haroon Ahmed – prominent scientist in the fields of microelectronics and electrical engineering
- Qanta Ahmed – physician specializing in sleep disorders. She is also an author and a newspaper columnist
- Rozina Ali – microvascular reconstructive plastic surgeon and consultant with a specialist interest in breast reconstruction; television presenter
- Nadia Bukhari – pharmacist and youngest female fellow of the Royal Pharmaceutical Society; an honour bestowed to those who have achieved excellence and distinction in their pharmacy career.
- Hasnat Khan – heart and lung surgeon who was romantically involved with Diana, Princess of Wales
- Mohammad Naseem – qualified GP and the chairman of the Birmingham Mosque Trust
- Asim Shahmalak – hair transplant surgeon and broadcaster, and proponent of such surgery; in 2009, he performed the UK's first eyelash transplant
- Afzal Javed OBE, SI – Psychiatrist and academic; President of the World Psychiatric Association (2020–2023); recipient of the Sitara-i-Imtiaz (2023) and OBE (2025).

== Sport ==
=== Boxing ===
- Tanveer Ahmed – former lightweight boxer; WBO Inter-Continental champion
- Ijaz Ahmed – British super-flyweight boxer
- Muhammad Ali – featherweight boxer; amateur champion
- Kyle Yousaf – British flyweight boxer; held the English flyweight title in 2018
- Hamzah Sheeraz – British light-middleweight boxer, WBO European title champion
- Kash Ali – British heavyweight boxer, holds the IBF European heavyweight title
- Ukashir Farooq – British bantamweight boxer, former British bantamweight title winner
- Usman Ahmed – super flyweight boxer
- Adnan Amar – British light-middleweight boxer, multiple title winner
- Adil Anwar – British light-welterweight boxer and multiple title winner
- Qais Ashfaq – British super-bantamweight boxer; Commonwealth silver medallist and WBA Continental title holder
- Jawaid Khaliq, MBE – first British Asian to win a world title belt
- Amer Khan – former undefeated light-heavyweight boxer, Central Area championship winner
- Amir Khan – British light-welterweight boxer; 2004 Olympics silver medalist; former world champion
- Haroon Khan – super-flyweight boxer and commonwealth bronze-medalist
- Nadeem Siddique – former British welterweight boxer, multiple title winner
- Adam Azim – professional boxer
- Aqib Fiaz – professional super-featherweight boxer
- Tasif Khan - former super-flyweight world champion

=== Cricket ===
- Danial Ibrahim – All rounder for Sussex county cricket club
- Saqib Mahmood – right arm fast bowler for Lancashire county cricket club
- Shoaib Bashir – spin bowler for Somerset county cricket club
- Saif Zaib – All rounder for Northamptonshire county cricket club
- Feroze Khushi – right handed batsman for Essex county cricket club
- Aquib Afzaal – left-handed batsman who bowls right-arm off break
- Kamran Afzaal – Pakistani-born English cricketer; right-handed batsman
- Usman Afzaal – cricketer who has played three Test matches for England
- Ajaz Akhtar – former Pakistani people-born English cricketer
- Mohammad Akhtar – Pakistani-born English cricketer; right-handed batsman who bowls right-arm off break
- Kabir Ali – English cricketer; formerly played for Worcestershire
- Kadeer Ali – cricketer formerly playing for Worcestershire and is related to Kabir Ali
- Moeen Ali – test cricketer playing for England and Worcestershire County Cricket Club
- Rehan Alikhan – English-born former cricketer of Pakistani descent; right-handed batsman and off-break bowler
- Akbar Ansari – English first class and List A cricketer who played his first class games for Cambridge University Cricket Club and Cambridge University Centre of Cricketing Excellence and List A cricket for Marylebone Cricket Club
- Zafar Ansari – English cricketer who plays for Cambridge University and Surrey County Cricket Club
- Imran Arif – Pakistani-born English cricketer; a fast-medium bowler; currently plays for Worcestershire County Cricket Club
- Asim Butt – Scottish and Pakistani cricketer; primarily a left-arm medium fast bowler
- Aamir Farooque – former Pakistani-born English cricketer
- Majid Haq – Scottish cricket player
- Omer Hussain – left-handed batsman; cousin of fellow Scottish international cricketer Majid Haq
- Moneeb Iqbal – Scottish cricketer; right-handed batsman and leg-break bowler
- Shammi Iqbal – English cricketer; right-handed batsman who bowls right-arm medium pace
- Imran Jamshed – former Pakistani-born English cricketer; right-handed batsman who bowled right-arm medium pace
- Shaftab Khalid – English cricketer, a right-arm off-spinner who also bats right-handed
- Aamer Khan – Pakistani-born former English cricketer
- Amjad Khan – former cricketer for England International and the youngest to play for the Danish national team
- Rawait Khan – former English cricketer who played for Derbyshire County Cricket Club and Pakistan Customs in a four-year first-class career which saw him bowl mostly in Second XI Championship matches
- Wasim Khan MBE – first British-born Pakistani to play professional cricket in England; talented left-handed batsman who also bowled right arm medium pace; now chief executive of Leicestershire County Cricket Club
- Sajid Mahmood – cricketer who formerly played international cricket for England and county cricket for Essex and Lancashire County Cricket Club
- Nadeem Malik – English cricketer, a right-arm fast-medium seam bowler and right-handed lower-order batsman
- Maneer Mirza – English cricketer; right-arm fast-medium bowler and right-handed batsman who played for Worcestershire
- Imraan Mohammad – English cricketer; right-handed batsman who bowls right-arm off break
- Waqar Mohammad – former Pakistani-born English cricketer; right-handed batsman who bowled leg break
- Saleem Mohammed – former English cricketer; right-handed batsman
- Azeem Rafiq – English cricketer
- Adil Rashid – English cricketer who plays for Yorkshire and England
- Hamza Riazuddin – English cricketer; right-handed lower-order batsman and a right-arm medium-fast bowler who currently plays for Hampshire
- Naheem Sajjad – Pakistani-born English cricketer; right-handed batsman who bowls left-arm fast-medium
- Bilal Shafayat – cricketer
- Rashid Shafayat – former English cricketer
- Owais Shah – former Middlesex, Essex and Hampshire cricketer who also appeared for England in a number of One Day Internationals and two Test matches
- Nadeem Shahid – former English first-class cricketer who played for Essex and Surrey
- Ajmal Shahzad – cricketer who plays for Nottinghamshire County Cricket Club and formerly represented England in all three formats of the game
- Safyaan Sharif – right-arm fast-medium bowler and a right-handed batsman
- Zoheb Sharif – left-handed batsman and a leg-break bowler
- Qasim Sheikh – Scottish cricketer; has represented Scotland on more than 20 occasions
- Alamgir Sheriyar – former Leicestershire cricketer
- Naqaash Tahir – English cricketer; right-arm fast-medium bowler who has played for Lancashire and Warwickshire
- Rehan Ahmed – English cricketer; youngest test debutant for England
- Abtaha Maqsood – Scottish cricketer; first hijab-wearing cricketer, plays for Sunrisers, Birmingham Phoenix and Scotland
- Nayma Sheikh – Scottish cricketer; plays for Scotland

=== Football ===
- Adnan Ahmed – former midfielder and Pakistan international
- Iltaf Ahmed – former goalkeeper and Pakistan international
- Reis Ashraf – former forward and Pakistan international
- Atif Bashir – former defender and Pakistan international
- Adam Docker – former defender
- Abbas Farid – freestyle footballer from Newport, South Wales;
- Usman Gondal – former midfielder and Pakistan international.
- Amjad Iqbal – former footballer who played as a defender and midfielder
- Zidane Iqbal – professional footballer who plays as a midfielder for Utrecht
- Omar Kader – former midfielder
- Otis Khan – footballer who plays as a midfielder for Grimsby Town and the Pakistan national team
- Shabir Khan – former defender who played for Worcester City, having progressed through their youth system and the Pakistan national team
- Adil Nabi – forward for West Bromwich Albion and the Pakistan national team
- Zeeshan Rehman –former defender and Pakistan international; first Pakistani and British Asian to play in the Premiership with Fulham
- Rashid Sarwar – Kilmarnock
- Kashif Siddiqi – former defender and Pakistani international
- Easah Suliman – defender and Pakistan international; has represented England at youth level, first player of Asian heritage to captain an England representative side, having done so at Under-16, Under-17 and Under-19 levels.
- Harun Hamid – midfielder and Pakistan international
- Nadia Khan – forward for Doncaster Rovers Belles and the Pakistan National Team
- Shadab Iftikhar – football manager; first British Asian to manage a Scottish senior team.
- Rahis Nabi – midfielder & Pakistan international
- Samir Nabi – midfielder & Pakistan international
- Imran Kayani – Pakistan international
- Sonny Perkins – plays for Leeds United
- Alfie Whiteman – goalkeeper for Tottenham Hotspur
- Nadia Khan - forward for Sheffield F.C. Women and Pakistan International

=== Martial arts ===
- Qasim Beg – undefeated kickboxing champion, two-time world champion
- Imran Khan – two-time World Muay Thai champion
- Nisar Smiler – two-time karate world champion and fifty-time gold medalist

=== Other sports ===
- Enaam Ahmed – Indy NXT driver and British F3 champion, series' youngest-ever champion at just 17 years old
- Shokat Ali – English snooker player of Pakistani descent; represents Pakistan in international tournaments
- Ikram Butt – former professional rugby league footballer; first south Asian to play either code of international rugby for England in 1995; founder of the British Asian Rugby Association and the British Pakistani rugby league team
- Gaz Choudhry – wheelchair basketball player; played for Paralympics GB in the 2012 Summer Paralympics in London
- Aamir Ghaffar – English badminton player
- Adam Khan – racing driver from Bridlington, Yorkshire; represents Pakistan in the A1 Grand Prix series; currently demonstration driver for the Renault F1 racing team
- Carla Khan – British-born squash player; granddaughter of squash legend Azam Khan
- Hiddy Jahan – squash player who was ranked among the top-6 players in the world from 1970 through to 1986
- Alessandro Latif – race car driver
- Zia Mahmood – Pakistani professional bridge player; a World Bridge Federation and American Contract Bridge League Grand Life Master
- Imran Majid – professional British pool player
- Imran Sherwani – former English field hockey player; was capped 45 times for Great Britain and 49 times for England
- Lianna Swan – swimmer, represented Pakistan in the 2014 Commonwealth Games
- Matthew Syed – table tennis international player; the English number one for many years

== Other ==
- Aliza Ayaz – youth climate activist
- Mazhar Majeed – sporting agent and bookmaker who came under police investigation in 2010 following reports of cricket 'match fixing' after a News of the World sting operation
- Omar Mansoor – fashion designer who showcased at the London Fashion Week in 2008
- Robina Qureshi – Scottish human rights campaigner
- Dina Wadia – daughter of Muhammad Ali Jinnah and Rattanbai Jinnah
- Shafilea Ahmed, a 17-year-old girl murdered by her parents in an Honour Killing.

== See also ==
- British Pakistani
- Overseas Pakistani
- List of Pakistani Americans
- List of Pakistani Canadians
- List of Pakistani Australians
