= Tell MAMA =

British hate monitorIng group

Tell MAMA (Measuring Anti-Muslim Attacks)
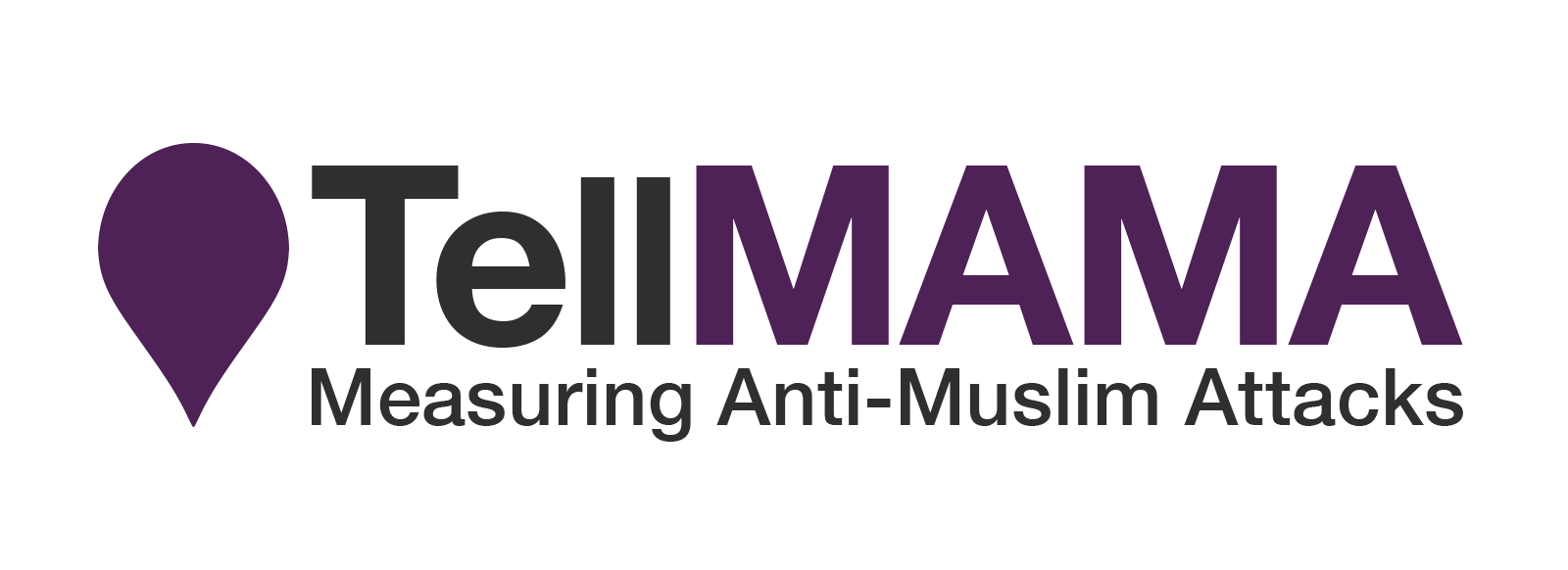
- Founder: Fiyaz Mughal
- Type: Project
- Legal status: Part of Faith Matters CIC
- Purpose: To ensure that anti-Muslim incidents and attacks in the UK are mapped, measured and recorded, and support provided for victims.
- Location: United Kingdom
- Services: Anti-Muslim hate monitor and victim support service
- Director: Iman Atta
- Parent organization: Faith Matters CIC
- Website: tellmamauk.org
- Mission statement To ensure that anti-Muslim incidents and attacks in the UK are mapped, measured and recorded, and support provided for victims.

Tell MAMA (Measuring Anti-Muslim Attacks) is a national project which records and measures anti-Muslim incidents in the United Kingdom.

Tell MAMA was launched on 21 February 2012 by Eric Pickles MP, Secretary of State for the Department for Communities and Local Government and is co-ordinated by the interfaith organisation Faith Matters. Faith Matters was founded by social entrepreneur Fiyaz Mughal OBE, a former adviser to the Leader of the Liberal Democrats, Nick Clegg, on Interfaith and Preventing Radicalisation and Extremism. The organisation's statistics have been the subject of debate, but were referenced by Theresa May when speaking at the Royal Institution of Chartered Surveyors on 23 March 2015.

The project was set up with government backing, and received start up funding from the Department for Communities and Local Government between 2012 and 2013. In November 2012, Deputy Prime Minister Nick Clegg announced a further £214,000 annual funding for Tell MAMA up to October 2013. Tell MAMA was funded for an initial period of 2 years and was funded on the basis of being self-sustaining after two years. Tell MAMA covers a range of issues and cases, and also works with mosques across the country.

Tell MAMA has had significant press coverage on its work to monitor anti-Muslim hate after the Charlie Hebdo shooting in Paris in 2015. It also reported on the rise of school-based anti-Muslim hate incidents that took place after the Paris murders, as well as on continuing anti-Muslim hate incidents on both Facebook and Twitter. Tell MAMA has additionally worked on some high-profile cases involving alleged anti-Muslim discrimination – for example at the Savoy Hotel, where the female worker in question who alleged the anti-Muslim discrimination was represented by Tell MAMA.

The BBC programme Inside Out highlighted the work of Tell MAMA through a programme entitled "Behind the Veil". It publicised the discovery that there was a 70% rise in Islamophobic hate crimes reported to the Metropolitan Police Service in the year July 2014 – July 2015, when compared to the same period the year before.

In March 2025, it was reported that the UK government was to cut all funding to Tell Mama, leaving it facing closure. Police warned the move could undermine efforts to track rising threats and support victims.

== Findings ==
By end of November 2013, the organisation had recorded 1,432 cases of abuse since its founding in February 2012. On 30 January 2014 the organisation released a graphic highlighting details of mosque attacks it had recorded between January 2012 to August 2013, including three bombings which took place in June and July 2013 (connected to a self-confessed white supremacist, Pavlo Lapshyn).

632 incidents were recorded in its first year of operation. One in three attackers reported to the project had links to far-right organisations. Of physical incidents reported in its first year, Tell MAMA founder Fiyaz Mughal said on BBC Sunday Morning Live that 70% were perpetrated against hijab or niqab-wearing women and the majority of attackers were white males, aged 20–50. In June 2013 these findings were analysed and verified by a team of academics at Teesside University, revealing that English Defence League (EDL) figures were linked to one-third of online incidents; the data said that almost two out of every three incidents were not reported to police.

Mughal, interviewed on Press TV in 2012, and writing for Hope not Hate, claimed that such incidents were becoming more violent and aggressive. Mughal also called on the Commonwealth of Nations to do more to combat Islamophobia.

Following the murder of British soldier Lee Rigby by two Muslim extremists, Tell MAMA recorded 83 incidents in 24 hours, and 212 over the week. During the same period, the Association of Chief Police Officers (ACPO) recorded a 'spike' of 136 anti-Muslim incidents which were directly reported to its True Vision hate crime reporting service.

As of October 2013, Tell MAMA had recorded 34 attacks against mosques since the Woolwich incident. Most cases involved graffiti, though others included arson, offensive DVDs, petrol bombs, smoke bombs, a suspected nail bomb, use of a pig's head, and threats and abuse of worshippers. Of particular significance was the bombing campaign carried out by Pavlo Lapshyn, which began shortly after the murder of Lee Rigby. This was preceded by the murder of pensioner and grandfather Mohammad Saleem by Lapshyn. Tell MAMA has since maintained an updated map of all mosque attacks in England, Wales and Scotland.

Tell MAMA's 2015 annual report highlighted the following key points about anti-Muslim hate crime in the UK:

- There was a total of 801 anti-Muslim incidents documented by Tell MAMA in 2015, 437 of which were classified as offline, and 364 of which were classified as online.
- The number of offline incidents of anti-Muslim hate crime had increased from 146 in 2014 to 437 in 2015, representing a 200% increase.
- There is a clear gendering of anti-Muslim hate crime, whereby Muslim women are more likely to be attacked than Muslim men in most settings. 61% of victims (whose gender could be ascertained) were women, 75% of whom were visibly Muslim. This suggests that the relative visibility of Muslim women's Islamic attire is a significant factor in anti-Muslim hate crimes.
- Due to the fact that anti-Muslim hate crimes occur most frequently in public areas, transport networks and places of business, anti-Muslim hate crime has the effect of restricting the mobility of Muslims in Britain. Many become afraid to leave their homes, use public transport or travel beyond the neighbourhoods in which they feel safe.

== Press coverage ==
Tell MAMA has received significant press coverage in relation to the surges in anti-Muslim incidents that follow Islamist terrorist attacks. This was the case following the Charlie Hebdo attack, where Tell MAMA reported on issues such as mosques receiving death threats, and the rise of school-based anti-Muslim hate incidents in the aftermath. Most notably, a Muslim student in Oxfordshire was reportedly slapped and called a 'terrorist' by classmates after a teacher raised the murders of 12 people at the French magazine and suggested that Muslims should be 'challenged' by the display of cartoons of the Prophet Mohammed.

== Reception from British Muslims ==
Inayat Bunglawala, founder and chair of Muslims4UK and a former media secretary at the Muslim Council of Britain, questioned Tell MAMA's links to the CST, which he linked to Zionism and neoconservatism. Former Hizb ut-Tahrir member, and now Senior Fellow at ICSR, King's College London, Shiraz Maher wrote in The Jewish Chronicle that:

Tell Mama is new and, though gauche in many respects, it is badly needed. It was established by Fiyaz Mughal, who led the "Muslims Against antisemitism" campaign. Unlike most Muslim groups, Tell Mama also records intra-Muslim sectarian attacks. More importantly, it replaces the Muslim Safety Forum, an extremist group dominated by Islamists who support Hamas.

Support has ranged from British Muslims for Secular Democracy through to the Council of Mosques in Calderdale where Tell MAMA was launched in West Yorkshire.

Tell MAMA founder Fiyaz Mughal was criticised by conservative Muslims in 2014 for inviting gay rights campaigner Peter Tatchell to be a patron of Tell MAMA.

== Controversies ==
=== Andrew Gilligan's pieces in The Sunday Telegraph ===
Andrew Gilligan in The Sunday Telegraph (1 and 9 June 2013) wrote that 57% of incidents recorded by Tell MAMA in the week after the Woolwich murder were online incidents. Other incidents – with the exception of mosque attacks in Grimsby and Essex – were "relatively minor, such as window-breaking or graffiti". Seventeen incidents involved assault on a person, although 11 of those were attempts to remove Islamic dress and none required medical treatment. According to Gilligan, Cressida Dick of the Metropolitan Police said that her force, which is one of the few forces which monitors anti-Muslim incidents, had seen fewer anti-Muslim incidents than after the 7 July bombings in 2005.

Gilligan wrote that the group's government funding was axed following concerns about its methods raised by Don Foster, the Minister for Communities. Gilligan's report said that the decision was made before the Woolwich attack and was based on perceived discrepancies between the group's statistics and ACPO and police records. Gilligan said "hate crime in mainly Muslim areas has fallen in the past 10 years". Gilligan also mentioned two cases in mid-May, before the Woolwich incident, where Tell MAMA had "been using its budget to threaten members of the public with libel actions for criticising it on Twitter": one was against a Jewish activist who criticised the group in Twitter postings. Atma Singh, Former race advisor to the then Labour Mayor of London, Ken Livingstone, who had been sacked from his position for creating a commercial company offering consultancy services for profit in March 2005 while still an employee of the Greater London Authority, was also threatened with action by Tell MAMA after he tweeted that the organisation "gives a platform to Islamists".

==== Tell MAMA response ====
Tell MAMA responded to Gilligan's criticism by stating that online attacks were worth recording and had links to real-world incidents and wider communal tensions. It disputed the rest of Gilligan's main accusations. On funding, it said that Deputy Prime Minister Nick Clegg confirmed in November 2012 that the project's funding of £214,000 was for one year only.

Government advisor and academic expert on Islamophobia, Dr Chris Allen, suggested that there was likely to be significant under-reporting of anti-Muslim incidents, based on a large 2009 EU-wide survey. Expert on far-right politics, Dr Matthew Feldman of Teesside University, contended that the nature of the data collected by hate-monitoring projects naturally differs to that collected by police, due to the nature of self-reporting.

A BBC News report said that the data is somewhat "patchy" but noted a number of "very serious" incidents which took place in the summer of 2013, including a number of attempts to set fire to Islamic schools and mosques. It also noted that Tell MAMA "has produced an online map of alleged attacks".

=== Other media articles ===
Charles Moore, also writing in The Daily Telegraph in June 2013, followed Gilligan's report by stating:

"...you frequently find that Muslim groups like Tell Mama get taxpayers' money (though, in its case, this is now coming to an end)...And you notice that many bigwigs in Muslim groups are decorated with public honours. Fiyaz Mughal, for example, who runs Tell Mama, has an OBE. Obviously it would be half-laughable, half-disgusting if activists of the EDL were honoured in this way: yet they are, in fact, less extreme than some of those Muslims who are."

Writing in the New Statesman magazine, academic Matthew Goodwin, of Nottingham University, an expert on British far-right politics, criticised Charles Moore and Andrew Gilligan, who he said were "proved wrong" in trying to "dismiss a documented rise in attacks against Muslims following the [Woolwich] attack." Goodwin went on to say:

"Moore's view of the EDL as "the instinctive reaction of elements of an indigenous working class" now sits uneasily alongside its founder's admission this week that – as we suspected all along – his creation is overrun by neo-Nazis and extremists, while both police and academic reports confirm that there was a significant spike in anti-Muslim attacks."

=== Sadiq Khan and Mohammed Amin response ===
Criticising the approaches of Gilligan and Moore, senior Labour frontbench MP Sadiq Khan, said:

"For decades, the British Jewish community has had to contend with the belittling of anti-Semitic attacks, whether they be on headstones in cemeteries or to Synagogues or schools. While we cannot be complacent, there is, rightly, a zero tolerance to anti-Semitism whether it be oral, viral or physical. Would we be comfortable with a respected journalist writing about the Community Security Trust the way Tell Mama has been written about? Or aspersions being cast on a politician due to their Jewish faith? Would we accept the Jewish community being talked about the way the Muslim community are? The piece would be roundly criticised, and rightly so."

Khan's words were echoed by deputy head of the Conservative Muslim Forum and Tell MAMA patron, Mohammed Amin, writing on the prominent Conservative Party blog, ConservativeHome:

"Given that Tell MAMA has adopted the methodology of the CST; and that the pattern of incidents that it is reporting is similar to the patterns reported by the CST – with incidents ranging from verbal abuse, internet abuse, to relatively rare cases of extreme violence – will these journalists be attacking the CST's next report the same way? Because, as far as I can see, there is little difference between the evils of anti-Semitism and anti-Muslim hatred, or the way in which both bodies which monitor such hatred function."

=== Tweet trial ===
A Liberty GB radio host, Tim Burton, was arrested, charged and prosecuted for comments he tweeted about Tell MAMA founder Fiyaz Mughal in the wake of the Islamophobia reporting controversy. Tim Burton was acquitted on 28 April 2017.

In 2017, Tim Burton was once again arrested, charged and prosecuted for a number of abusive emails and tweets directed at Mughal. He was found guilty of religiously aggravated harassment on 28 March 2017, and was given a custodial sentence of 12 weeks. Judge Alex Gordon said of Burton's campaign of harassment: "It was pre-meditated, it was determined, it was deeply unpleasant, and it was part of a campaign by you and your associates to tar all Muslims as Islamists."

Burton subsequently resigned from his position as radio officer for Liberty GB.

== Patrons ==
Patrons of the Tell MAMA project include Jonathan Bloch, the Reverend Mark Oakley, John Esposito, Canon Dr. Giles Fraser and Lord Sheikh of Cornhill.

In April 2014, former head of the Community Security Trust, Richard Benson, was announced as the new Chair of Tell MAMA. More recently, former Government Minister Shahid Malik was appointed as Chair on the Tell MAMA project.

== See also ==
- Muslim Safety Forum
