= Better Than That =

Better than that may refer to:

- Better Than That (campaign), a UK anti-hate crime campaign launched in 2016
- "Better Than That", a 2011 song by Status Quo from the album Quid Pro Quo
- "Better Than That" (song), a 2013 single by Miles Kane
- "Better Than That", a 2015 song by Marina and the Diamonds from the album Froot
- "Better Than That", a 2018 song by James from the album Living in Extraordinary Times
