= Naguib Kheraj =

British banker (born 1964)

Naguib Kheraj CBE
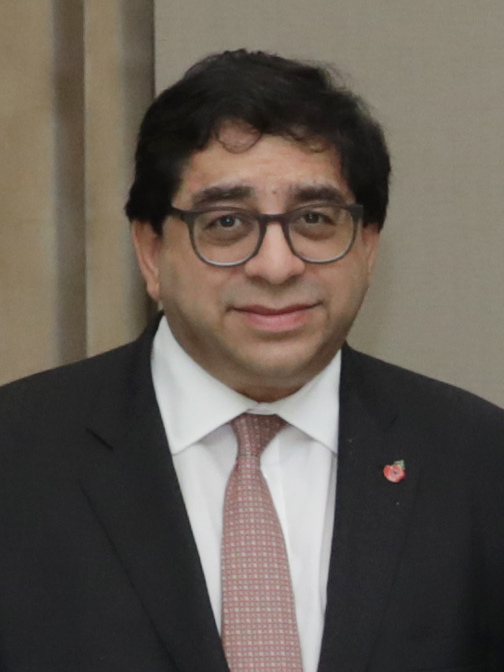
- Born: 15 July 1964 (age 61)
- Education: Dulwich College
- Alma mater: University of Cambridge

Naguib Kheraj CBE (born 15 July 1964) is a British banker.

== Early life ==
Kheraj was born in July 1964 in South London and grew up in Tanzania, Switzerland, Pakistan and the Middle East. He is a member of the Ismaili community. Kheraj attended Dulwich College back in South London. He went on to study at Robinson College, Cambridge, where he graduated with a degree in economics.

== Career ==
Kheraj began his banking career at Salomon Brothers in 1986, and went on to hold a number of senior positions at other international financial institutions. Over the course of 12 years at Barclays, Kheraj served as group finance director and vice-chairman, as well as in various business leadership positions. He was chief executive officer (CEO) of JP Morgan Cazenove, a London-based investment banking business.

Kheraj is a former non-executive director of NHS England, and has served as a senior adviser to Her Majesty's Revenue and Customs and to the Financial Services Authority in the UK. He has served as a member of the board of the UK-US Fulbright Commission, on the Investment Committee of the Wellcome Trust and the Finance Committee of Oxford University Press.

Kheraj is chairman of Rothesay Life, a specialist pensions insurer, Deputy Chairman of Standard Chartered, an international banking group and serves on the finance committee of the University of Cambridge.

Kheraj spends a substantial portion of his time as a senior adviser to the Aga Khan Development Network, and serves on the boards of various entities therein, including the Aga Khan University, the University of Central Asia and The Institute of Ismaili Studies. He is also chairman of its endowment committee.

Kheraj was appointed Commander of the Order of the British Empire (CBE) in the 2024 New Year Honours for services to business and the economy.

== See also ==
- List of British Pakistanis
