= Tariq Modood =

British Pakistani Professor of Sociology, Politics, and Public Policy

Tariq Modoood MBE, FBA, FAcSS
- Born: 1952 (age 73–74); Bristol, England

Academic background
- Education: University of Durham; University College Cardiff; University College Swansea

Academic work
- Discipline: Sociologist
- Sub-discipline: Specialist on ethnic minorities in Britain
- Institutions: University of Bristol

Tariq Modood, MBE, FBA, FAcSS (born 1952) is a British Pakistani Professor of Sociology, Politics, and Public Policy at the University of Bristol (1997– ). Modood is the founding director of the Centre for the Study of Ethnicity and Citizenship.

== Education ==
Modood holds bachelor's and master's degrees from the University of Durham, a PGCE from University College Cardiff, and a PhD from University College Swansea. Following fellowships at Nuffield College, Oxford, and the University of Manchester, Modood became a senior research fellow at the Policy Studies Institute, London (1993–97).

== Research ==
Modood's research interests include racism, racial equality, multiculturalism, and secularism. Modood was the principal researcher involved in the Fourth National Survey of Ethnic Minorities in Britain published as Ethnic Minorities in Britain: Diversity and Disadvantage by the Policy Studies Institute at the University of Westminster in 1997. Research that he led in 1999 showed that university lecturers from ethnic minorities were half as likely to become professors compared to white lecturers. The research concluded "minority ethnic groups experienced discrimination in applications for posts and promotions, harassment, and negative stereotyping". A study published in 2002 found that older universities in the UK discriminated against Indians, Pakistanis, black Africans, and Irish students whereas some universities formed since 1992 actively favoured ethnic minorities. Modood said he thought that the discrimination was not conscious and that "Universities generally pride themselves on their ethnic diversity and would have no truck with deliberate discrimination".

In 2004 he co-authored a report for the Department for Education and Skills which found that ethnic minority graduates were less likely to gain top jobs than their white counterparts. The difference was thought to be partly due to discrimination but also due to the fact that ethnic minority students do not achieve as high grades in university. In 2006 he co-authored a report that examined whether policies used to increase employment levels among ethnic minorities in Northern Ireland, the Netherlands, Canada, and the United States could be applied to Great Britain. He was Bristol director of the Leverhulme Programme on Migration and Citizenship with UCL. He has served on the DfES Race, Education, and Employment Forum, was part of the Commission on the Future of Multi-Ethnic Britain (1997–2000), and a member of the IPPR Commission on National Security (2007–09), and a member of the National Equality Panel chaired by Professor John Hills (2008–10). He is also a co-founder of the scientific journal Ethnicities.

Tariq Modood currently serves as part of a steering group for the Commission on Religion and Belief in British Public Life.

== Opinions ==
Modood defines equality as: "not having to hide or apologise for one's origins, family, or community but requiring others to show respect for them, and adapt public attitudes and arrangements so that the heritage they represent is encouraged rather than contemptuously expect them to wither away."

Modood is critical of policies that force secular identities upon religious minorities, he has coined the term "radical secularism" for this and commented that it "cannot be secured without illiberal measures". He has also said that some people feel "that religious people are not worthy of protection; more than that, they should be subject to not just intellectual criticism but mockery and ridicule..."

In Multicultural Politics: racism, ethnicity, and Muslims in Britain (2005), Modood argues that multiculturalism should not be abandoned due to criticism following events such as the 7 July 2005 London bombings. He points out that Britain is far less racist than in the past, and that films and television shows such as Bend It Like Beckham and The Kumars at No 42 demonstrate that Britain is multicultural. Despite this, he believes that there are still problems with what he terms "cultural racism" which focuses on language, religion, family structures, dress, and cuisine.

Speaking at the Labour Party Conference in 2007 he asked "What is Britishness anyway?" and said that ethnic minorities should engage with the concept of Britishness which he called a "very diverse and plural identity". Modood was a signatory of a letter organised by Sunny Hundal in 2008, that called for Gordon Brown to abandon plans to allow terror suspects to be held for up to 42 days without charge; the plans were later abandoned.

== Honours ==
In the 2001 New Year Honours, Modood was appointed a Member of the Order of the British Empire (MBE) for services to social sciences and ethnic relations. He was elected to the Academy of Social Sciences in 2004. In July 2017, he was elected a Fellow of the British Academy (FBA), the United Kingdom's national academy for the humanities and social sciences.

== Publications ==
Books:

- Essays on Secularism and Multiculturalism, (ECPR Press Rowman & Littlefield International,2019)
- Multiculturalism, Second Edition, (Polity, 2013)
- Still not easy being British (Trentham Books, 2010)
- Secularism, Religion and Multicultural Citizenship, editor with G. Levey (Cambridge University Press, 2009)
- Multiculturalism: A Civic Idea (Polity Press, 2007)
- Multicultural Politics: Racism, Ethnicity and Muslims in Britain (University of Minnesota Press and University of Edinburgh Press, 2005)
- Ethnicity, Social Mobility and Public Policy in the US and UK, editor with Glenn Loury and Steven Teles (Cambridge University Press, 2005)
- Ethnic Minorities in Britain: Diversity and Disadvantage: The Fourth National Survey of Ethnic Minorities, Modood, T., Berthoud, R., Lakey, J., Nazroo, J., Smith, P., Virdee, S. & Beishon, S, (Policy Studies Institute, 1997)
- Asian Self Employment: The Interaction of Culture and Economics in England, Metcalf, H., Modood, T. & Virdee, S.(Policy Studies Institute, 1996)
- Changing Ethnic Identities, Modood, T., Beishon, S. & Virdee, S. (Policy Studies Institute, 1994)
- Not Easy Being British: Colour, Culture and Citizenship, (Runnymede Trust and Trentham Books, 1992)

== See also ==
- List of British-Pakistanis
