= Sadia Azmat =

English comedian

- Azmat in 2024
- Born: 1990 (age 35–36); Leyton, London, UK

Comedy career
- Years active: 2010–present
- Medium: Stand-up
- Genres: Observational comedy, self-deprecation
- Subjects: British Asian culture, stereotypes, racism, Islamic humour
- Website: www.sadiaazmat.com

Sadia Azmat (Urdu: عظمت سعدیہ; born 1990) is an English stand-up comedian, author and broadcaster.

== Early life ==
Azmat was born to Indian parents in Leyton, England. At the age of 19, she started wearing hijab.

== Career ==
Azmat had been working in call-centres of varying descriptions, but in 2010, Azmat started performing stand-up comedy.

In August 2011, she performed her debut show Please Hold – You're Being Transferred to a UK Based Asian Representative at the Edinburgh Fringe Festival at the Laughing Horse @ Finnegan's Wake, which was directed by Deborah Frances-White. In August 2011, Azmat also featured on BBC Radio 4's Front Row and a producer invited her to perform at the Cape Town Festival 2012.

In December 2011, she performed at the Desi Central Comedy Tour in Glasgow.

In August 2014, she performed her debut full-length show I'm not Malala at the Edinburgh Fringe Festival at the Laughing Horse. In September 2014, she was interviewed by Nadia Hussein and Sakinah Lenoir on British Muslim TV's Sisters' Hour.

In June 2015, she made a short film Things I Have Been Asked As a British Muslim as part of the British Muslim Comedy series, five short films by Muslim comedians commissioned by the BBC for release on BBC iPlayer. Azmat debunked Muslim stereotypes, including the "Muslim verdict", racism, Ramadan, integration and hijab, thus providing a look at life as a Muslim woman. In August 2015, she performed at the inaugural Muslim Lifestyle Expo at the Ricoh Arena in Coventry. In September 2015, she appeared on Sky News's Morning Stories series on YouTube, questioning what people would be willing to do for someone we love.

In January 2016, Azmat appeared on This Week where she criticised David Cameron's push for English language lessons for Muslim women to help them resist the lure of Islamic extremism.

In March 2017, as part of our All Women Everywhere month, Azmat appeared on a video about Asian Women talking about stereotypes they deal with while dating.

From 2018 to 2020 Azmat hosted three series of the podcast No Country for Young Women with fellow comedian Monty Onanuga for BBC Sounds. The series saw the hosts "work out how we balance our identities as British women of colour" and explore "life, love and work in a white man's world". The podcast was named among the best audio of 2018 by Miranda Sawyer for The Observer. It was also one of Apple Podcasts's top picks for 2018.

On 26 May 2022 Azmat's first book, a memoir entitled Sex Bomb: The Life and Loves of an Asian Babe, was published by Headline Publishing Group. The theme of the book was partially inspired by an article Azmat wrote for Metro in 2019 titled "Horny Muslim women like me aren’t supposed to exist during Ramadan". She sent the article to an editor who felt that pop culture and social commentary was lacking the perspective of sexually liberated Muslim women. Azmat said that she was inspired by the question "why do we just perceive Muslim women to be repressed? There’s a whole conversation that needs to be had." A paperback edition was published on 1 June 2023.

Azmat also a regular in the YouTube channel Bend It TV aimed at providing the news from an Asian perspective.

== Comedy style ==
Azmat's act is observational humour about her experiences working as a call centre operative for a well-known car insurance firm, being a British Asian Muslim growing up in London, and moves on to more general cross-cultural issues, about race and religion, her difficulties in the UK job market and an Asian mum gag.

Azmat is described by The Sunday Times as "hilarious and insightful" for her current set of I Am Not Malala.

== Awards and recognition ==
In September 2011, Azmat was shortlisted for the Funny Women Awards final in Leicester Square Theatre, London.

For International Women's Day 2022, she featured on the Evening Standard list of "London women changing the world".

== See also ==
- Islamic humour
- British Pakistani
- List of British Pakistanis
