= Tarak Ramzan =

British businessman

- Born: Mohammad Tarak Ramzan; January 1953 (age 73); Glasgow, Scotland
- Occupation: businessman
- Known for: Founder and CEO of Quiz

Mohammad Tarak Ramzan (born January 1953) is a British businessman, and the founder and CEO of the Quiz womenswear retail chain.

== Early life and business career ==
Ramzan was born in the Southside area of Glasgow, Scotland. In 1947, his father arrived in Scotland from Pakistan, and started a business making duffle coats, kilts, and tartan pinafores, before returning to Pakistan, with his son taking over a staff of 30 at the age of 18.

As of early 2017, Quiz had more than 300 stores and outlets worldwide, and employed 1500 people.

In July 2017, Ramzan listed the company on the AIM section of the London Stock Exchange with an initial market valuation of £200 million as it raised £102.7 million of cash from investors.

== See also ==
- List of British Pakistanis
