= Ethnicities (journal) =

Peer-reviewed academic journal

- Discipline: Ethnic studies
- Language: English
- Edited by: Stephen May; Tarig Modood

Publication details
- History: 2001–present
- Publisher: SAGE Publications
- Frequency: Bimonthly

Standard abbreviations
- ISO 4: Ethnicities

Indexing
- ISSN: 1468-7968
- LCCN: 2001223219
- OCLC no.: 635692872

Links
- Journal homepage; Online access; Online archive

Ethnicities is a peer-reviewed academic journal that publishes research in the fields of sociology and politics concerning questions of ethnicity, nationalism and related issues such as identity politics and minority rights. It was established in 2001 and is published bimonthly by SAGE Publications. The editors-in-chief are Stephen May (University of Auckland) and Tariq Modood (University of Bristol).

== History ==
Ethnicities was established in 2001, initially with three issues a year. The following year it moved to four issues and in 2012 to six issues. The founding editors were Stephen May and Tariq Modood.

Debate Section Ethnicities carries a Debate section that addresses topics of debate within the subject area, including: constructivist and realist conceptions of culture (volume 1.2), critical multiculturalism (volume 1.3), cosmopolitanism (volume 3.4), feminism, ethnicity and reproductive technology (volume 5.2), whiteness (volume 6.2), symbolic ethnicity (volume 9.1), critical race theory (volume 9.2).

Review symposia This section of Ethnicities has explored the work of people like Bhikhu Parekh (volume 1.1), Brian Barry (volume 2.2), Paul Gilroy (volume 2.4), Glen Loury (volume 3.2), Evelyn Nakano Glenn (volume 4.3), Will Kymlicka (volume 8.2), and Veit Bader (volume 9.4).

Special issues Ethnicities publishes a special issue each year, past issues include cities and ethnicities (volume 2.3), multiculturalism and identities (volume 3.3), racialization in the USA (volume 4.3), identity, culture and globalization (volume 5.3), ethnic inequalities and education (volume 7.3), women and multiculturalism (volume 8.3), Muhammad cartoons controversy (volume 9.3).

Invited Symposia The journal commissions Invited Symposia, which discuss topical issues. In its first issue, the journal offered an academic symposium on the key issues facing the field of ethnicity at that time, with contributions from Craig Calhoun, Nira Yuval-Davis, T.K. Oommen, Rogers Brubaker, Thomas Hylland Eriksen, Roger Waldinger and Will Kymlicka. In its early volumes, Ethnicities published an editorial (2.1) and an academic symposium on the reasons for, and potential consequences of, the September 11, 2001 terrorist attack on the USA (2.2), with the latter including contributions from Mahmood Mamdani, Mohammad Waseem, Ruth Rubio-Marín, Barnor Hesse, Ien Ang, and the late Iris Marion Young.

Ethnicities has cross-disciplinary aims and contains articles from the disciplines of sociology, political theory, cultural geography, anthropology, cultural and media studies, history, education, social psychology and law.

== Abstracting and indexing ==
Among other databases, Ethnicities is abstracted and indexed in Scopus and the Social Sciences Citation Index. According to the Journal Citation Reports, its 2022 impact factor is 2.505 and 5-year impact factor is 2.471, ranking it 7th out of 13 journals in the category "Ethnic Studies".
