= Peter Cowgill =

British businessman (born 1953)

- Born: Peter Alan Cowgill; 18 March 1953 (age 73)
- Education: University of Hull
- Occupation: Businessman
- Known for: JD Sports; Quiz; United Carpets; Better Bathrooms

Peter Alan Cowgill (born 18 March 1953) is a British businessman who was the executive chairman of JD Sports until 25 May 2022.

== Biography ==
He was educated at De La Salle Grammar School, Manchester and graduated from the University of Hull with a bachelor's degree.

In 2019, when JD Sports posted record results, Cowgill said this was partly due to staying “in tune with the millennials and Generation Z”. During his time in the role, the brand expanded globally, and acquired an American chain in 2018 in a deal that Cowgill described as “transformational”. He also secured exclusive products from Nike and Adidas.

In 2022, Cowgill was announced as the first non-executive chairman of The Fragrance Shop.
