= Better Than That (campaign) =

UK anti-hate crime campaign launched in 2016

Better Than That is a UK anti-hate crime campaign created in response to the significant rise in hate crimes following the 2016 United Kingdom European Union membership referendum.

It launched on 1 December 2016. The campaign is supported by UK Prime Minister Theresa May and a cross-party group of politicians.

== Launch ==
The launch meeting on 1 December 2016 was attended by a number of parliamentarians including members of the Conservative Party (Baroness Warsi, Eric Pickles), the Labour Party (Rosena Allin-Khan) and the Liberal Democrats (Tom Brake).

== Supporting organisations ==
Among the organizations which support the campaign are:

- British Future
- Community Security Trust
- Faith Matters
- Jewish Labour Movement
- Jewish Leadership Council
- Kick It Out
- Polish Social and Cultural Association
- Tell MAMA UK
- Board of Deputies of British Jews
- Union of Jewish Students
