= Ahmad Hussain =

Islamic musician

Ahmad Hussain احمد حسین
- Born: 9 November 1981 (age 45); Sheffield, South Yorkshire, England
- Origin: Sheffield, South Yorkshire, England
- Genres: Faith Inspired Music: Islamic; a cappella; Nasheed; hamd; na'at
- Occupations: Singer; songwriter; music executive; humanitarian; music producer
- Years active: 2003 – present
- Label: IQRA Promotions
- Website: ahmadhussain.com

Ahmad Hussain (born 9 November 1981) is a British Nasheed singer-songwriter, executive, producer of Kashmiri, Pakistani descent. He is the founder and managing director of IQRA Promotions. He is also a humanitarian who is widely known for utilising his musical talent to support charitable projects the world over.

== Early life ==
Ahmad Hussain was born in Sheffield, South Yorkshire, England to Kashmiri parents on 9 November 1981. At an early age, Ahmad started to explore his interest in music and performance. As a child, he showed an interest in instruments, he had his own keyboard at the age of five and at school he was always keen to sing. He first visited a studio at the age of ten, when his elder brother, Abid Fazal, founded and managed the UK's first community radio station - RSL [Restricted Service Licence] - Meridian Radio in June 1992

== Recording career ==
Ahmad produced many underground singles, and in 2003, he released a fusion album, the album was a blend of Eastern and Western musical influences and broke through to the mainstream music scene. Later that year, Ahmad's elder sister, Shazia Hussain, died aged 28 while participating in a sporting event in Middlesbrough. This was a turning point in Ahmad's life and prompted him to question his own life and he began searching for answers. He left the mainstream music scene and found this genre of spiritual music. Ahmad also decided to dedicate and utilise his talents to support the less fortunate and support humanitarian causes the world over.

In 2004, Ahmad set up an outlet to propagate Islam and to serve the wider community, he also set up IQRA Promotions in December 2005 a platform which would allow him to organise events to highlight issues such as gun crime, gangs, domestic abuse and spirituality. In 2006, he produced Kamal Uddin's second album Illallah.

In 2009, Ahmad's debut single "Aye Khuda" was released which was number one on TV's top ten charts for five consecutive weeks. In July 2010, his debut album I Turn to You was released, which featured songs in Arabic, Urdu and English, along with his first music video "Children of the World". In 2013, two singles and videos were released entitled "Ya Taiba", and "My Beloved" which is a tribute for his mother who was diagnosed with cancer, notably the video was shot in the Cheshire home of Gary Barlow. In June 2014, he released his second album entitled My Beloved was released, which features songs in Urdu, Arabic and English In August 2015, Ahmad released a free download single entitled "Zara Chehre Se".

Ahmad released his much anticipated third album in 2016, a spiritually uplifting album entitled Nur (The Light) In 2018, Ahmad released his fourth studio album Dua and followed it up with a collaboration single with Pakistani and Bollywood legend Ustad Rahat Fateh Ali Khan.

Ahmad was also one of the three judges on Ummah Channel's show Ummah Talent.

Ahmad's single "Bulao Phir received over 1 million views in just over 2 weeks as well as climbing into the top 3 of the world music charts.

In 2021 Ahmad went onto release his fifth studio album 'Ummati' along with five music videos.

== Performances, tours and media appearances ==
Ahmad has travelled to countries around the world and performed in Turkey, South Africa, the U.S., Morocco, Dubai, Netherlands, Trinidad and Pakistan to name a few. He has performed alongside artists, including Maher Zain, Outlandish and speakers such as Attallah Shabazz (the daughter of Malcolm X).

In April 2012, Ahmad performed at the Evening of Inspiration event organised by Islamic Relief.

In July 2013, he was interviewed by Raees Khan in the Desi Nation studio on BBC Radio Lancashire. In October of the same year, he performed at the Global Peace and Unity Event in the ExCeL Exhibition Centre in London organised by Islam Channel.

In May 2014, he performed at the Islamic Circle of North America convention. In November of the same year, he performed at the Sounds of Light event organised by Human Appeal International, which raised £520,000 for Gaza.

In 2018 Ahmad recorded a collaboration with Pakistani and Bollywood legend Ustad Rahat Fateh Ali Khan. In the same year Ahmad's single "Bulalo Phir received over 1 million views in just over 2 weeks as well as climbing into the top 3 of the world music charts.

In 2020 Ahmad took part in the first ever Global Eid event with the Oxford Foundation and has had his music endorsed by the head of religious studies at Harvard University.

In 2021 Ahmad went onto release his fifth studio album Ummati along with five music videos.

In July 2021, Ahmad was invited by the Mohammed Rafi family to perform a spiritual tribute at the inaugural event by the Mohammed Rafi institute on the 41st death anniversary of the legendary singer. Ahmad shared the platform with esteemed guests from the music world including Bollywood playback singers Nitin Mukesh, Kavita Krishnamurthy and Shabbir Kumar as well as composer Rehman Naushad (the son of Naushad).

== Humanitarian work ==
After the death of his beloved sister, Ahmad dedicated his talent to supporting humanitarian causes the world over and often donates proceeds from his events to these causes. Notably Ahmad once helped raise over half a million pounds for the children of Gaza on one tour alone with Islamic Relief. Ahmad also visits educational establishments regularly to inspire the next generation and to engage them in musical workshops.

Ahmad's input to promote spiritual music amongst pupils at Bradford's Feversham Academy resulted in the children improving their overall grades and the story gained popularity worldwide.

Ahmad also volunteers with the Alzheimer's society where he regularly sings for groups of adults with dementia as a form of musical therapy. Ahmad slept out on the coldest night of the year, in freezing temperatures to raise money for the homeless with the InTouch Foundation.

Ahmad has supported charities the world over and was recently appointed as an ambassador for Kashmir's first SMART hospital and is also an advocate for engaging communities and giving them confidence in standing up against domestic abuse as well as being outspoken on the issues of gang violence and gun crime.

== Awards and nominations ==
In 2013, Ahmad was nominated for Young Entrepreneur of the Year at the first Minority Business Awards.

in 2016, Ahmad was shortlisted for “young Muslim of the year” at the prestigious British Muslim Awards.

In 2018, Ahmad was inducted into the power 100 Muslim list, a list that recognises the contributions of prominent Muslims to the social, economical and political well being of Britain.

in 2019, Ahmad was awarded the silver play button by YouTube.

== Discography ==
=== Singles ===
Year	Single	Album
2009	"Aye Khuda"	I Turn to You
2013	"Ya Taiba"	I Turn to You
2013	"My Beloved"	My Beloved
2015	"Zara Chehre Se"	Nur
2016	"Jeena Hain Mushkil"	DUA
2018	"Allah Hu" (featuring Rahat Fateh Ali Khan)	
2018	"Saif ul Malook"	
2019	"Bulalo Phir	
2020	"Shah e Madina"	Ummati
2021	"Tu Ameer e Haram"	Ummati
2021	"Taiba Ke Jane Wale"	Ummati

=== Albums ===
Title	Album details
I Turn to You	*Released: July 2010: Label: Iqra Promotions; Formats: CD, Digital Download
My Beloved	*Released: 19 June 2014: Label: IQRA Promotions; Formats: CD, Digital Download
Nur (The Light)	* Released: June 2016: Label: IQRA Promotions; Format : CD, Digital Download
DUA	* Released: July 2018: Label: IQRA Promotions; Format : CD, Digital Download
Ummati	* Released: April 2021: Label: IQRA Promotions; Format : CD, Digital Download

== Videography ==
Year	Title
2009	"Aye Khuda"
2010	"Children of the World"
2011	"I Turn to You"
2013	"Ya Taiba"
2013	"My Beloved"
2014	"Muhammad (PBUH)"
2014	"Palestine"
2015	"Hazir Hain Hum"
2015	"To the Light"
2016	“Lab Pe Aati Hain”
2016	“Ab To Bas”
2016	“Marhaba Ya Mustafa”
2016	“Missing You”
2016	“Jeena Hain Mushkil”
2017	“Chehra Nur e Qamar”
2017	“Sun Le Sadaa”
2017	“Mujhko Bedard”
2018	“DUA”
2018	“Nasheed Medley”
2018	“Allah Hu ft Rahat Fateh Al Khan”
2018	"Saif ul Malook"
2019	"Heer"
2019	"Bulalo Phir"
2020	Shah e Madina
2021	Tu Ameer e Haram
2021	Taiba Ke Jane Wale
2021	Unke Andaz e Karam
2021	Aye Sabz Gumbad Wale
2021	Jab Cheer Ke
2022	Kar Liya Soda
2022	Tajdar-E-Haram

== See also ==
- British Pakistanis
- List of British Pakistanis
- Islamic music
- Durood
- Hamd
- Madih nabawi
- Na'at
- Nasheed
