= West London Film Studios =

- Alternative names: WLFS

General information
- Type: Film and television studios
- Location: Hayes, Middlesex, England, Springfield Road, Hayes, Middlesex, UB4 0RG, England
- Coordinates: 51.509667°N 0.397831°W
- Opening: May 2014
- Owner: Frank Khalid
- Operator: Matilda Wylie

Website
- westlondonfilmstudios.com; thehospitallocation.co.uk

West London Film Studios (WLFS) is a British film studio and television studio complex located in Hayes, London.

The studios cater to small and large productions; for films, television shows, TV adverts and photo shoots.

== History ==
Frank Khalid bought the studios in 2005. The studios did not officially open as West London Film Studios until 18 May 2014. Actor Aaron Paul, who played Jesse Pinkman in U.S. TV-drama Breaking Bad, joined Frank Khalid to cut the ribbon at the official opening of WLFS.

== Facilities ==
WLFS has 105,000 square feet of studio-space, including six stages, office-space, prop stores and construction space.

WLFS offers The Hospital Location: the only medical film studios located in the United Kingdom dedicated to providing sets for all things related to medicine. Productions which have used The Hospital Location include Luther, Silent Witness, and Topsy and Tim. Walkers snack foods have also used the facility.

WLFS was also home to MADE Entertainment which is a charity which creates film, TV & video production projects for marginalised groups.

== Productions ==
Examples of productions shot or partly-shot at WLFS include:

=== Film ===
- The Imitation Game (2014)
- Burnt (2015)
- Bridget Jones's Baby (2016)
- Another Mother's Son (2017)
- Freehold (2017)
- The Party (2017)
- The Mercy (2018)
- Yardie (2018)
- 2036 Origin Unknown (2018)
- 10x10 (2018)
- All the Devil's Men (2018)
- Stan & Ollie (2019)
- The Aeronauts (2019)
- Judy (2019)
- Last Christmas (2019)
- The Gentlemen (2019 film) (2020)
- The Duke (2020 film) (2020)
- The Owners (2020 film) (2020)
- The Father (2020 film) (2021)
- His House (2020)

=== Television ===
- Derek Christmas Special (2014)
- Sky One's Fungus the Bogeyman (2015)
- London Spy (2015)
- The Marriage of Reason and Squalor (2015)
- New Tricks (2015)
- Not Going Out Christmas Special (2015)
- Peep Show (2015)
- Spotless (2015)
- Toast of London (2015)
- Top Coppers (2015)
- Unforgotten (2015)
- You, Me and the Apocalypse (2015)
- Black Mirror: San Junipero (2016)
- Churchill's Secret (2016)
- Cuckoo (2016)
- Horrible Histories (2016, 2017 & 2019)
- The Keith Lemon Sketch Show (2016)
- Mum (2016 & 2018)
- The Nightmare Worlds of H. G. Wells (2016)
- Siblings (2016)
- Bad Move (2017)
- Chewing Gum (2017)
- Episodes (2017)
- The Halcyon (2017)
- Liar (2017)
- People Just Do Nothing (2017)
- Prime Suspect 1973 (2017)
- Strike (2017, 2018 & 2020)
- Witless (2017)
- Killing Eve (2018, 2019 & 2020)
- Kiss Me First (2018)
- There She Goes (2018)
- Small World (2018)
- ITV's Hatton Garden (2019)
- Island of Dreams, BBC (2019)
- Turn Up Charlie (2019)
- Hold the Sunset (2019)
- Good Omens (2019)
- Top Boy (2019)
- The Reluctant Landlord (2019)
- The Capture (2019)
- Hitmen (2020)
- Trying (2020)
- Sitting in Limbo (2020)
- Ted Lasso (2020 & 2021)
- Finding Alice (2021)
- Dead Pixels (2021)
- Cheaters (TBC)

=== Commercials ===
Commercials which have been at West London Film Studios through their respective agencies:

- Jacob's
- Ladbrokes Coral
- Cineworld
- Domestos
- Ford Motor Company
- Netflix
- Samsung
- National Lottery (United Kingdom)
- Dunelm Group
- Kit Kat
- BlaBlaCar
- BMW
- Burberry
- Jaguar Cars
- Sounds Like Friday Night
- Cadbury
- The Automobile Association
- BP
- Seiko Epson
- Budweiser
- JD Sports
- B&Q
- Head & Shoulders

=== Music ===
Bands or artists which have been at West London Film Studios include:

- Dizzee Rascal
- Charli XCX
- Noel Gallagher
- Newton Faulkner
- Little Mix
- You Me at Six
- WSTRN
- Madonna
- Hannah Diamond
- Krept and Konan
- Chip
- Jme
- London Grammar
