= Rozina Ali =

English surgeon

Dr Rozina Ali
- Born: Rozina Shahzady Ali; 21 October 1967 (age 59); Liverpool, Lancashire, England
- Education: St Thomas's Hospital Medical School
- Occupations: Surgeon, consultant
- Website: www.rozinaali.com

Rozina Shahzady Ali (born 21 October 1967) is an English microvascular reconstructive plastic surgeon and consultant with a specialist interest in breast reconstruction, and television presenter.

== Education ==
Ali was born and brought up in Liverpool, Lancashire (now Merseyside), England. She attended Liverpool Girls College, and at the age of 16 she moved to London.

In 1989, Ali graduated from the University of London with a first class degree in BSc Anatomy. In 1992, she graduated from St Thomas's Hospital Medical School, University of London with first class MBBS honours in her thesis included studies on osteoarcheology and she worked in the Natural History Museum for a year. Which led to further work on bones and leprosy, and spend four months in a leper colony in South America contributing to a World Health Organisation study on the ocular effects of leprosy.

In 1996, Ali graduated from Royal College of Surgeons of England with a FRCS. In 2004, she won the 'Stephen Kroll Scholarship' to study microvascular breast reconstruction in Gent, Belgium. In 2006, she won an International Microvascular Fellowship to study microvascular reconstructive surgery in Taiwan for a year. She has also been awarded a British Association of Plastic Surgeons European Travelling Scholarship and a Surgical Fellowship from the Worshipful Company of Cutlers.

Ali has been awarded a BAPS (British Association of Plastic Surgeons) European scholarship and in 2007 was awarded the Cutler's Surgical Fellowship. Ali is a highly trained and experienced microvascular reconstructive surgeon with a specialist interest in all aspects of breast surgery.

== Medical career ==
In 2001, Ali was one of only three people from the United Kingdom to attend the inaugural world society of reconstructive microsurgery conference. Since August 2007, she has been based at Norfolk and Norwich University Hospital.

Her Postgraduate surgical training was undertaken in specialist units such as Great Ormond Street Hospital for Sick Children and St Andrews Centre for Plastic Surgery and Burns.

Ali has conducted research into innate skin defense mechanisms at the Centre for Cutaneous Research (St Barts and The Royal London RFC) and was awarded her doctorate in 2007.

Ali has devoted considerable time to gaining expertise in correcting congenital breast abnormalities, breast symmetrising surgery and enhancing breast aesthetics. She is experienced in minimal scar techniques and favours single scar breast surgery and the use of natural tissues. Increasing demand for her services has led to the addition of gynaecological reconstruction to her practice.

== Writing career ==
Ali is widely published and a presenter and teacher. She has been active in contributing to some of the major international plastic surgery and breast surgery texts. These include: Surgery of the Breast: Principles and Art (2nd Ed); Grabb's Encyclopedia of Flaps (3rd Ed); Perforator Flaps: Anatomy, Technique and Clinical applications (1st Ed). She has collaborated with some of the world's leading authorities on breast reconstruction and microvascular surgery to write editorials and supplements as well as original papers.

Ali has a specialist interest in all aspects of breast surgery and has published and presented nationally and internationally, including the United States, China, Taiwan, Australia and Europe. She has been active in writing and editing books on breast surgery as well as specialist literature on microvascular surgery and has collaborated with many of the world's leading authorities on breast reconstruction and microvascular surgery.

== Television career ==
Ali has presented her data in the United Kingdom and United States and was a scientific advisor to the BBC Q.E.D. documentary on antimicrobial peptides and appeared in the BBC Open University Blue Sky series.

In July 2012, she presented BBC2's Horizon series episode, The Truth about Looking Young. She discovers the latest research about how the foods we eat can protect our skin from damage, and how a chemical found in a squid's eye is at the forefront of a new sun protection cream. She also finds out how sugar in our blood can make us look older, and explores a new science called glycobiology, which promises a breakthrough in making us look younger. She also examines why some people appear to age better than others, and explores scientific innovations including a pill that manufacturers claim has rejuvenating properties, and a cream that replaces skin sugar, and so reduces wrinkles.

Since 2012, Ali has regularly appeared on Channel 4's How Not To Get Old as an advisory aesthetic surgeon.

== Personal life ==
Ali divides her time between Norwich and London.

== See also ==
- British Pakistanis
- List of British Pakistanis
