= Aneel Mussarat =

British businessman (born 1969)

- Born: 6 November 1969 (age 56); Manchester, England
- Occupation: Real estate developer Philanthropist
- Title: Founder of MCR Property Group
- Spouse: Mehr Mussarat
- Children: 4

Aneel Mussarat is a British businessman, philanthropist and founder of MCR Property Group.

== Early life ==
Aneel was born in Manchester in November 1969 and is of Pakistani heritage. After completing high school, Aneel started to buy, renovate and rent out properties in Manchester.

== Career ==
After completing high school, Aneel started to buy, renovate and rent out properties in Manchester and bought his first property at the age of 18. In 1989 Aneel founded Classic Homes. Having earned the title “Student Housing Magnate” following on from the notable “Student Villages” project, Aneel went on to found MCR Property Group, with their first purchase of Manchester city centre office blocks.

By 2008 Mussarat's personal fortune was report to be £208 million and saw him rank in the Sunday Times Rich List.

In 2005 Manchester Council had to apply for an injunction to stop Classic Homes demolishing a Whalley Range house that had tenants living in it.

== Politics ==
Aneel Mussarat became affiliated with Pakistan-based political party Pakistan Tehreek-e-Insaf in 2012 and has done considerable fundraising for them in the United Kingdom. Due to Mussarat's background in real estate development, he has advised Imran Khan on a key manifesto pledge, which was to implement a policy framework for building 5 million homes in Pakistan by the year 2023.

== Personal life ==
Mussarat is married, and has 4 children. He lives in Cheshire. He is a Sunni Muslim

== Awards and recognition ==
In 2008, Mussarat was listed on the Sunday Times Rich List, and ranked the 550th richest person in the United Kingdom. He was also awarded Businessman of the Year, at the British Muslim Awards in 2013.

In 2018, he received an honour for his business and philanthropic work at the Greater Manchester Business Leaders Dinner & Awards for his work in founding the Rafay Mussarat Foundation and his ongoing work to provide aid for Rohingya people.

In 2019, Mussarat was nominated in the category of Businessman of the Year in the English Asian Business Awards.

== See also ==
- List of British Pakistanis
