= Omar Mansoor =

British fashion designer

- Born: Faisalabad
- Education: London College of Fashion
- Occupation: Fashion designer
- Label: Omar Mansoor
- Website: omarmansoor.com

Omar Mansoor is a British Pakistani fashion designer, best known for his couture occasion wear.

== Career ==
After attending the London College of Fashion, Mansoor was the first Pakistani to showcase at London Fashion Week, in 2008. OM made its appearance at Royal Ascot, Bahrain Fashion Week, Paris Fashion Week, New York Fashion Week and Top Model UK.

BBC did a short documentary on Mansoor's journey in 2015, and he won the TMUK achievement in women's wear award the same year. He is part of a professional mentoring committee at the University of the Arts London and delivers lectures at various universities globally.
