= Quiz (clothing) =

UK Clothing retailer

- Type: Public
- Traded as: LSE: QUIZ
- Industry: Fast fashion
- Founded: 1993; 33 years ago
- Founder: Tarak Ramzan
- Defunct: June 21, 2026
- Fate: Administration
- Headquarters: Glasgow, Scotland, UK
- Number of locations: 300 (2017)
- Key people: Tarak Ramzan (CEO); Peter Cowgill (Independent Non-executive Chairman)
- Website: quizclothing.co.uk quizgroup.co.uk

Quiz was a British clothing retailer headquartered in Glasgow, Scotland.

== History ==
It was founded in 1993 in Scotland.

In 2017 the company became public and floated on the London Stock Exchange. Its chairman is Peter Cowgill. In 2017, it was valued at £245 million.

In June 2020, Quiz announced plans to put its 82 UK and Ireland branches into administration before buying them back, allowing it to renegotiate rents. The move meant 93 jobs would be cut.

On 20 February 2025, it was announced that around 200 jobs are to be lost as Quiz entered administration once again. Five shops are to close across Ireland (in Athlone, Derry, Enniskillen, Newbridge and Tallaght), with its shop in Newry and its concessions in Carlow, Drogheda, Mullingar and Portlaoise to remain in operation. The troubled retail group had been scrambling to secure its future after warning it could run out of cash in the first few months of 2025. The company, which, as of February 2025, runs 62 stores and 47 concessions across the UK, has appointed insolvency practitioner Teneo as administrator to its wholly owned subsidiary, Zandra Retail Limited. Following the appointment of administrators, Orion Retail Limited, another subsidiary of the Company, has agreed to immediately acquire 42 stores operated by Zandra. The chain went into administration again less than a year later on 5 February 2026.
