= Chicken Cottage =

British fast food chain

Chicken Cottage Limited
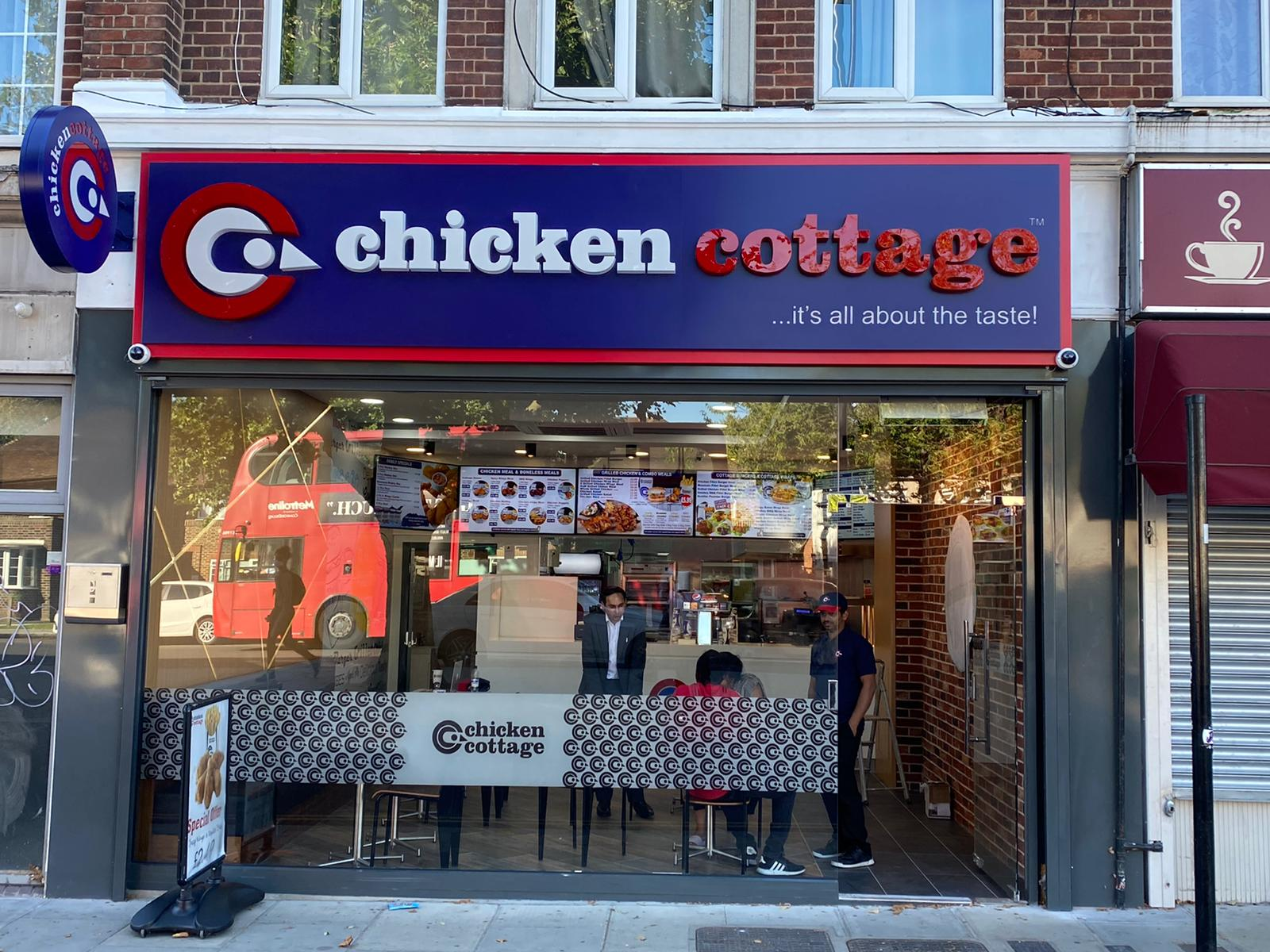
- Chicken Cottage, North End Road, Fulham, London
- Type: Restaurant Franchise
- Industry: Fast food
- Founded: 1994; 32 years ago
- Headquarters: London, England, UK
- Area served: Iraq; Pakistan; Nigeria; Belgium; Kenya; Italy; Malaysia; Ireland; United Kingdom
- Products: Grills, Burgers, Wraps, BBQ, Wings
- Website: chickencottage.com

Chicken Cottage Limited is a UK-based fast food chain. The company is the master franchisor and owner of the "Chicken Cottage" brand. Its taste is modelled on a blend of the South Asian and Southern United States flavours using halal ingredients. As of November 2024, it operates 67 outlets in the UK.

== History ==
Chicken Cottage was established in 1994 as a partnership and incorporated in February 2001. The first Chicken Cottage store was opened in 1994 in Wembley, North London.

In February 2012, TI Global Food Holdings Ltd, a subsidiary of Terengganu Incorporated Sdn Bhd (Terengganu Inc), which is the main investment arm of the State of Terengganu, Malaysia, acquired a 22% stake in the company. The remaining 30% was at that point owned by Ri-Yaz Global Food Brands Inc, a subsidiary of Ri-Yaz Holdings, whose main focuses include hospitality, franchise business & development.

== Food safety ==
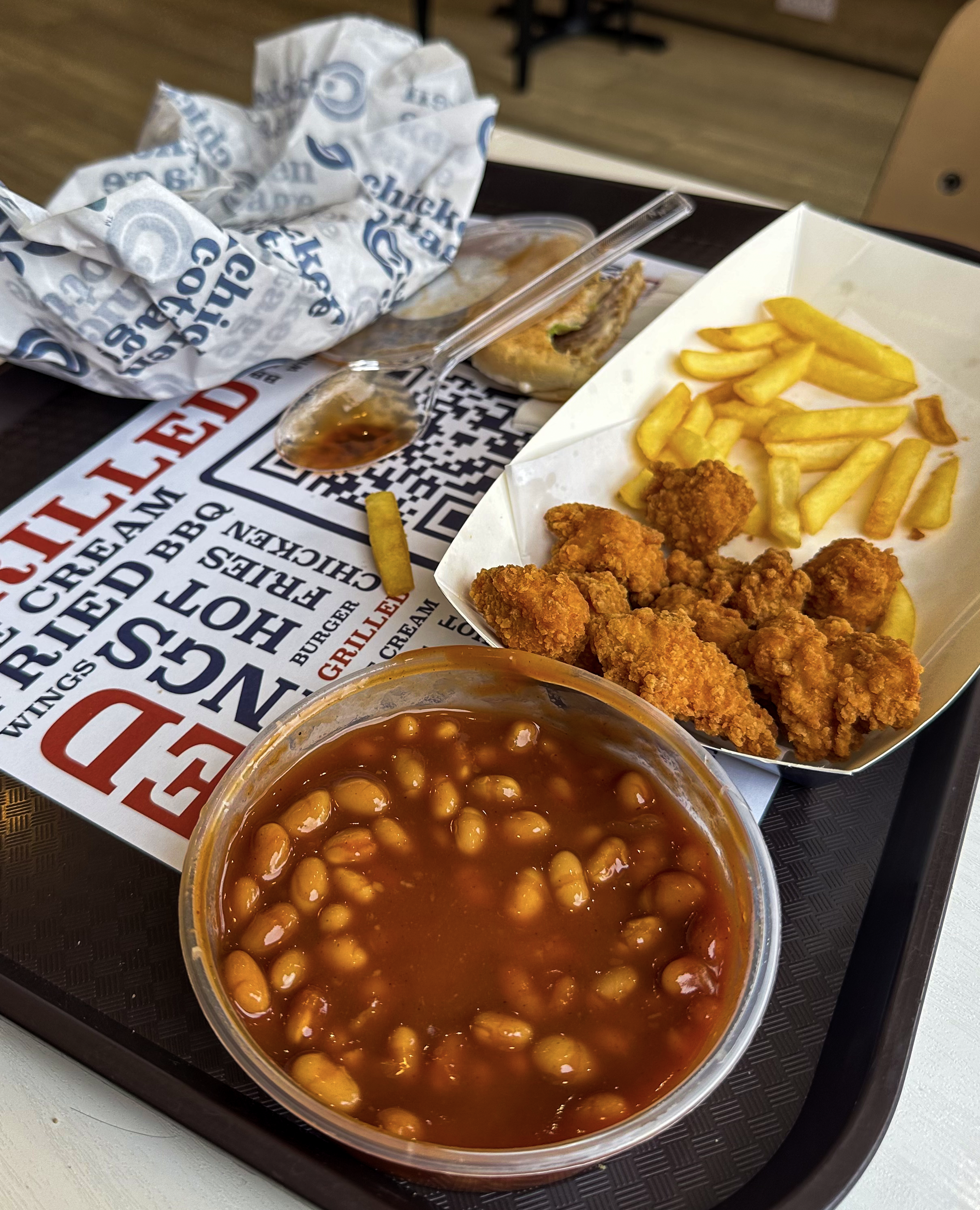
A typical Chicken Cottage meal in Chatham, Kent, England

On 4 September 2003, the BBC consumer affairs TV programme Rogue Restaurants identified extremely serious environmental health problems with two outlets of Chicken Cottage in Greater London where raw chicken was not kept refrigerated for long periods and products were used after their use by dates. The programme did report that the Chicken Cottage headquarters promised to take remedial action once the BBC had informed them of the problems.

== International expansion ==
Malaysia's first branch opened in Ladang Tok Pelam, Kuala Terengganu in December 2015 and Taman Tun Dr Ismail in Kuala Lumpur (both branches are closed). There are plans to have 50 more outlets, including 15 in Terengganu . Other outlets are in Iraq, Kenya, Pakistan, Nigeria, Belgium, Ireland and Italy.
