= Pepe's Piri Piri =

British fast food restaurant chain

- Industry: Fast food
- Founded: 2007; 19 years ago
- Headquarters: Watford, England, UK
- Number of locations: 260 (2026)
- Area served: United Kingdom; Pakistan; United Arab Emirates
- Website: pepes.co.uk

Pepe's Piri Piri, better known as Pepe's, is a British-based fast food chain which specialises in flame-grilled piri piri chicken. It is the UK's largest piri piri chicken franchise with over 250 UK locations. All of its locations are halal and offer a vegetarian menu.

== History ==
Pepe's Piri Piri first opened in 2007 with a location on Whippendell Road in Watford. It celebrated its 200th UK store opening in Gilmerton, Edinburgh on 20 August 2024. They are the kit sponsors of Harefield United F.C. for the 2025/26 seasonas well as Stirling University W.F.C for the 2026/2027 season .

=== International expansion ===
In Pakistan, its first outlet was opened in the World Trade Center Islamabad in November 2017. As of March 2026, it has three locations in the country.

Its first location in the United Arab Emirates was opened in Dubai in December 2020. It opened its flagship store in City Walk, Dubai in May 2023.
