= Aamer Sarfraz, Baron Sarfraz =

British businessman and politician (born 1981)

The Right Honourable The Lord Sarfraz
- عامر احمد سرفراز
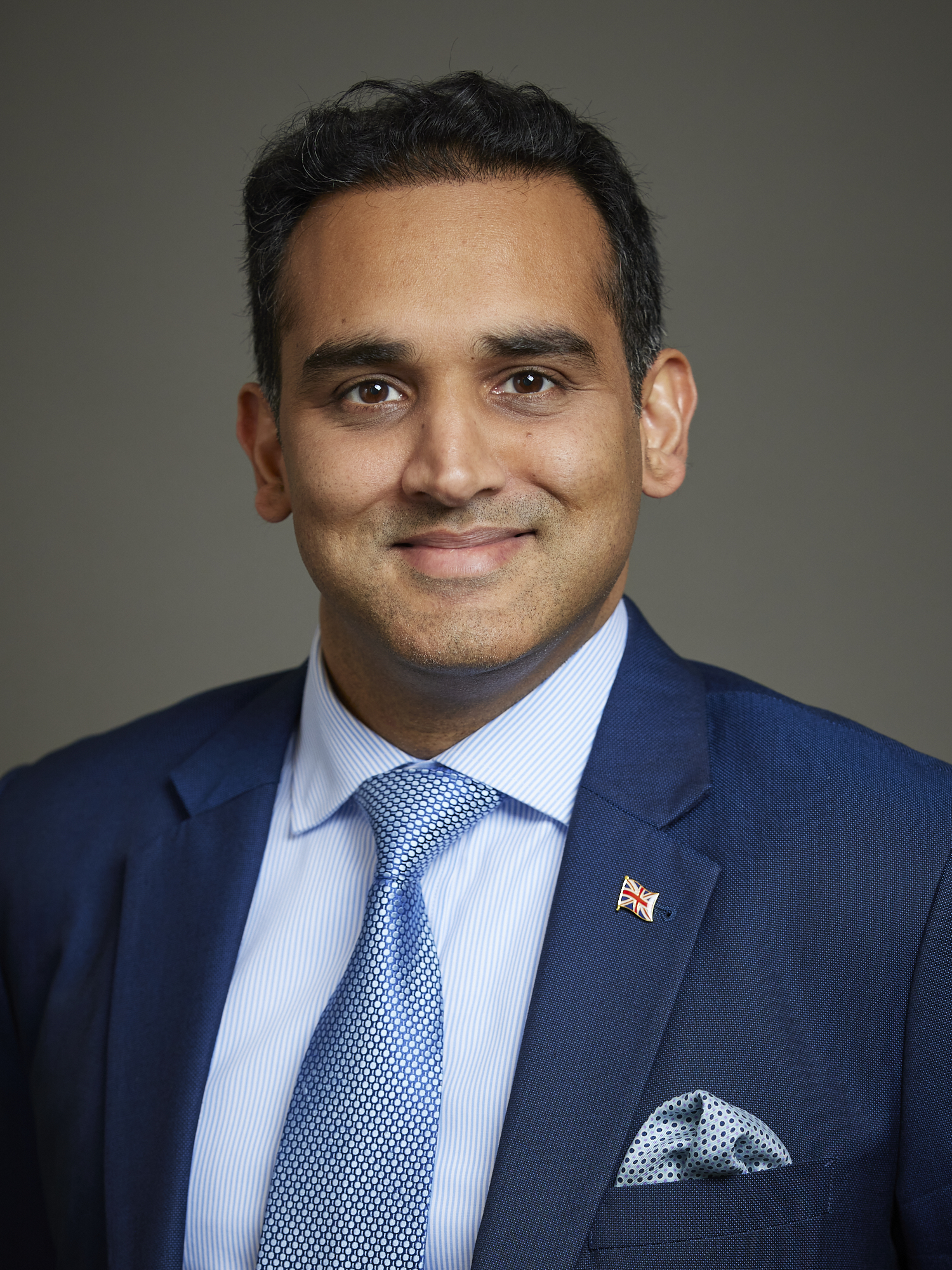
- Official portrait, 2023

Member of the House of Lords
- Lord Temporal
- Life peerage 8 September 2020

Prime Ministerial Trade Envoy to Singapore
- In office 12 January 2022 – 5 July 2024
- Prime Minister: Boris Johnson; Liz Truss; Rishi Sunak

Chancellor of the University of East London
- Incumbent
- Assumed office 1 August 2025

Personal details
- Born: Aamer Ahmad Sarfraz; 25 September 1981 (age 45) London, England
- Party: Conservative
- Spouse: Maryam Sayeed Sarfraz
- Children: 3
- Education: Boston University (BS); London School of Economics (MSc)
- Website: lordsarfraz.com

Aamer Ahmad Sarfraz, Baron Sarfraz (Urdu: عامر احمد سرفراز; born 25 September 1981) is a British-Pakistani businessman and politician. He was previously a Conservative Party Treasurer, before being nominated for a life peerage by Boris Johnson in the 2019 Dissolution Honours List.

== Background ==
Sarfraz was born on 25 September 1981 to a Pakistani Muslim family in London. He grew up in Islamabad and migrated to the United Kingdom in 2002. He is a graduate of Boston University, the London School of Economics, and the Royal College of Defence Studies.

== Professional career ==
Sarfraz is the founder of NetZeroAg, an agriculture business working with smallholder farmers in Asia. Sarfraz was previously a managing director at The Electrum Group, a private equity firm, and a Venture Partner at Draper Associates, an early-stage technology venture capital firm.

On 31 July 2025 he was announced as the new Chancellor of the University of East London.

== Conservative Party fundraising ==
As a Conservative Party Treasurer, Sarfraz chaired the Business and Entrepreneurs' Forum, described as 'a network of business leaders that support the Conservative Party', charging £3,000 a year for membership.

Since 2018, he has donated £172,500 to the Conservative Party.

== Philanthropy ==
Sarfraz established The Lord Sarfraz Foundation, which predominantly works with underprivileged communities in Pakistan. The Sarfraz Lecture is held annually at Wolfson College Oxford focusing on the history and culture of Pakistan.

== House of Lords ==
Sarfraz was nominated to the House of Lords on 31 July 2020, and was created Baron Sarfraz, of Kensington in the Royal London Borough of Kensington and Chelsea on 8 September 2020. Sarfraz took his seat in the House of Lords on 28 September 2020, and delivered his maiden speech on 19 October 2020. Sarfraz stated that improving relations between Pakistan and the United Kingdom would be a fundamental part of his new work.

=== Prime Ministerial Trade Envoy ===
In January 2022, he was appointed as the Prime Minister's Trade Envoy to Singapore.

=== Committee Appointments ===
Since January 2021, Sarfraz has been a member of the Science and Technology Committee.

Since March 2023, he has been a member of the AI in Weapon Systems Committee, and since June 2023, a member of the Joint Committee on the National Security Strategy (JCNSS).

=== Advocacy ===
In October 2020, Sarfraz praised the UK government's support for Rohingya Muslims, and called on it to redouble its humanitarian efforts to support religious minorities around the world.

Lord Sarfraz called on the newly established UK Infrastructure Bank to invest directly in companies and “do the difficult direct deals, not outsource their responsibilities to third party fund managers". He has advocated for the launch of a UK Central Bank Digital Currency and for the Chief Executive of the FCA to issue guidance to the crypto industry.

Lord Sarfraz criticised the IMF's strict conditionality on developing countries and said that the UK should use its influence “to ensure the IMF is offering loan terms that countries can accept” and that the IMF “needs to take a radically new approach to its lending practices”.

Sarfraz has called on the UK government to increase support for the alternative proteins sector and in 2022 launched the UK's Alternative Proteins Association.

== Honorary Military Appointments ==
United Kingdom

- (United Kingdom) 15 September 2025–: Honorary Colonel of the 31 (Middlesex Yeomanry & Princess Louise’s Kensington) Signal Squadron

== Arms ==
Coat of arms of Aamer Sarfraz, Baron Sarfraz
Crest The top of a mountain per fess lowered indented Argent and Vert ensigned by a decresent Or. Escutcheon Per pale Argent and Or issuant in base a representation of the Dome of the Prophet’s Mosque at Medina Proper in chief four roses two and two Gules barbed and seeded Proper. Supporters Dexter a lion Or sinister a snow leopard Argent spotted Sable. Motto Faith, Service

Sarfraz was granted a coat of arms with a baronial coronet by the College of Arms. His shield contains a depiction of the dome of The Prophet's Mosque in Medina, the first such instance in English heraldry. He was also granted heraldic supporters: a lion for the United Kingdom and a snow leopard for Pakistan. His crest features snow-topped mountains in reference to Islamabad, topped by an Islamic crescent.

His motto is "Faith Service".

Orders of precedence in the United Kingdom
Preceded by The Lord Clarke of Nottingham	Gentlemen; Baron Sarfraz	Followed by The Lord McLoughlin
