= Dixy Chicken =

British fast food chain

- Type: Wholly owned subsidiary
- Industry: Restaurants
- Founded: 1986; 40 years ago
- Founder: Mohammed "Mo" Chowdhury and Samuel Jackson (Meshoe)
- Headquarters: Bury, Greater Manchester, England
- Number of locations: 150+ worldwide
- Area served: United Kingdom; Pakistan; India; United States; New Zealand; Saudi Arabia; Syria; New Zealand; United Arab Emirates; Norway
- Key people: Mohammed Ali Bhatti (Owner, chairman & CEO)
- Products: Fast Food (chicken burgers • chicken • chips • soft drinks • salads • desserts)
- Parent: Dixy Group Holdings Limited
- Website: dixychicken.co dixychickenlimited.com

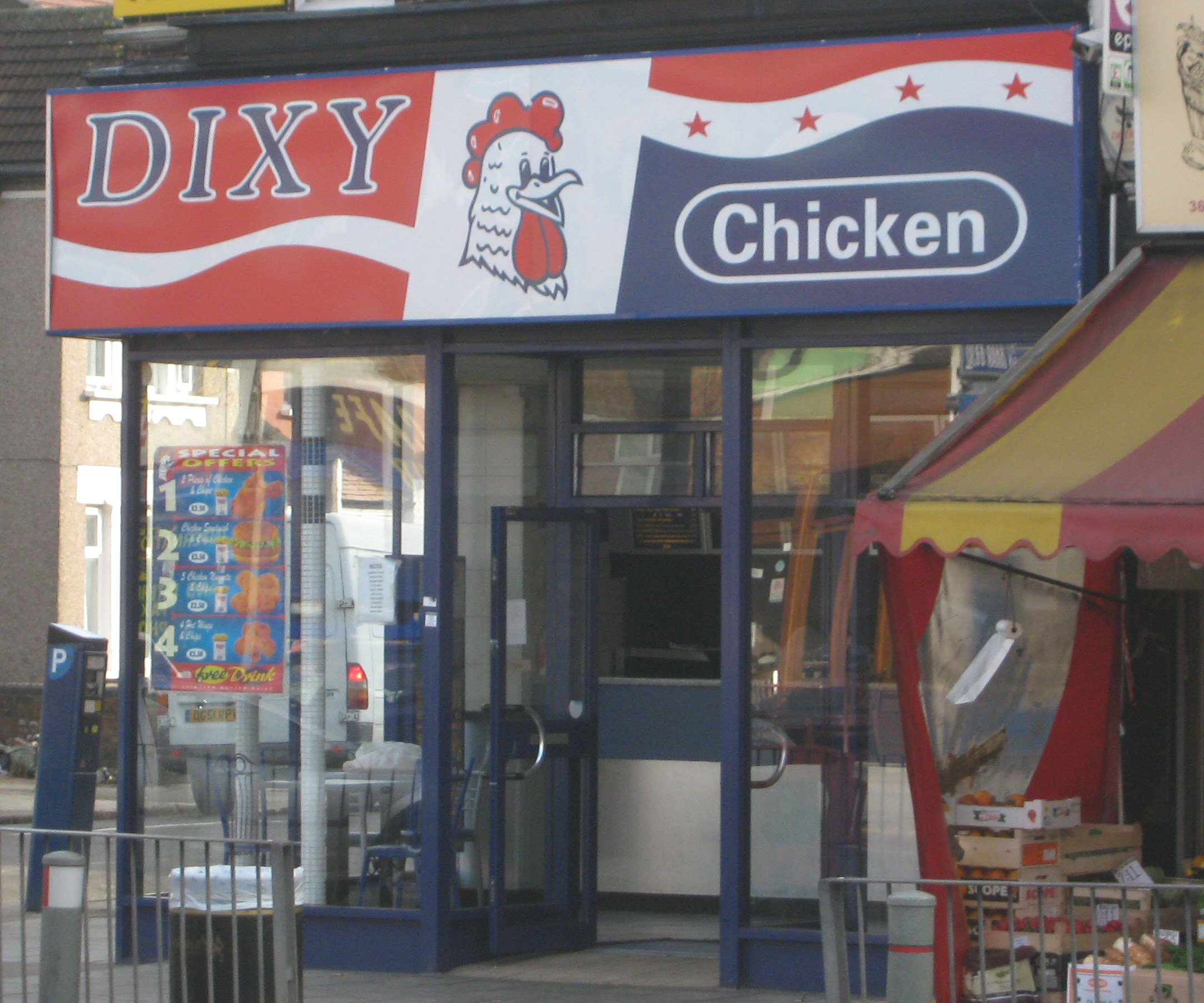
A Dixy Chicken branch in Palmers Green, London in 2010, displaying the old logo.

Dixy Chicken is a British fast food chain that specialises in halal fried chicken, founded in 1986 in Solihull and currently headquartered in Bury. The company was founded by two British Pakistanis, who began by offering halal versions of products found in restaurants such as McDonald's and KFC, before it developed into its own chain. It is owned by an English company, Dixy Group Holdings Limited. Dixy Chicken has 110 outlets within the United Kingdom, the majority on high streets, with some drive thru locations. Internationally, it has locations in Syria, Norway, United States, New Zealand, India, Pakistan, Saudi Arabia and the United Arab Emirates.

== History ==
Dixy Chicken was founded in 1986 by Mohammed "Mo" Chowdhury and Samuel Jackson (Meshoe). It was taken over by the American chain Church's Chicken in February 2008. At the end of 2008, it was acquired by Shakeel Arshad. In 2022, Arshad sold the company to Mohammed Ali Bhatti.

== Food safety and hygiene ==
The Food Standards Agency lists hygiene ratings for the 73 outlets in the United Kingdom, and 39 have received 4 or 5 stars.

In February 2012, after being open for just two weeks, an outlet in Staffordshire was awarded two out of five stars on Staffordshire Borough Council's Rate My Place food safety inspection scheme, noting numerous issues including 'haphazard' refrigerated food storage methods, infected blood found on the packaging of some cheese slices, inadequate hot water supply and cooked chicken being stored below the required temperature of 63 °C.

In July 2014, the Dixy Chicken food chain had the worst hygiene record across the United Kingdom; a third of the outlets failed to meet "satisfactory levels" of hygiene, and nearly half in London failed to meet satisfactory levels. A worker in a branch in Birmingham was filmed washing their feet in a sink, and another was shut down and fined £10,000, after mouse droppings were discovered.

A branch in Hackney was also shut down after a rat infestation. In August 2021, Walsall Council closed a branch of Dixy Chicken within their Borough for a widespread rat infestation.

== See also ==
- List of fast-food chicken restaurants
