= Shakeel Begg =

Prominent British Muslim who lost a significant libel case against the BBC

Shakeel Begg is a prominent British Muslim, He has been imam of the Lewisham Islamic Centre in London since 1998. He has played a role in the British Muslim community, has been invited to speak at mosques and Islamic events, and has been a spokesman for the Muslim community at events and in press releases.

He lost a court case on 28 October 2016 in which he sued the BBC for libel for calling him an extremist.

== Background and education ==
Begg grew up in South London, and was educated in the London Borough of Lewisham. He studied at the Islamic University of Madinah and reportedly has an M.A. degree in Islamic studies from the Markfield Institute of Higher Education, diplomas in Islamic jurisprudence and Islamic finance, and a certificate in Islamic chaplaincy.

== Role in the British Muslim community ==
Begg has been chief imam and khatib of the Lewisham Islamic Centre since 1998. The mosque, at which the killers of Lee Rigby had worshipped, was a 2016 participant in the Muslim Council of Britain's "Visit my Mosque" programme.

He has been prominent in the British Muslim community, has been invited to speak at mosques and Islamic events, and has been a spokesman for the Muslim community at events and in press releases (including attempts to secure the release by ISIS of British hostage Alan Henning). Begg was Muslim chaplain at Goldsmiths, University of London.

Begg was interviewed in the 2009 British Film Institute film, Outside the Law: Stories from Guantánamo. He participated in a 2013 event, "Freedom of Speech – Are Muslims Excluded?", organised by the non-profit organisation ENGAGE. The following year, Begg spoke at the CAGE "Is it a crime to care for Syria and Gaza?" event; "hundreds of people turned up to listen to prominent Muslim speakers from different political organisations and theological backgrounds – moderates, conservatives, Islamists and democrats." He has participated in an interfaith press release. In 2014, Begg and other British imams also approached ISIS about the release of British hostage Alan Henning.

== Libel case - court rules him an Islamic Extremist ==
Begg took the BBC to court for libel in 2015 (see Defamation in the United Kingdom), alleging that the corporation had labelled him an extremist; in November 2013, presenter Andrew Neil had said on Sunday Politics that Begg had called jihad the greatest of deeds.

In his summing-up of the case on 28 October 2016, Mr Justice Charles Haddon-Cave said: "Begg clearly promotes and encourages violence in support of Islam and espouses a series of extremist Islamic positions. On occasions when it has suited him ... he has shed the cloak of respectability and revealed the horns of extremism." The judge gave a 10-point definition of Islamic extremism, and said that four of Begg's speeches indicated that he promoted such violence; in two speeches, the imam espoused extremist positions. "Shakeel Begg is something of a Jekyll and Hyde character," Haddon-Cave said. "He appears to present one face to the general, local and inter-faith community and another to particular Muslim and other receptive audiences. The former face is benign, tolerant and ecumenical. The latter face is ideologically extreme and intolerant."

In a 2006 speech, Begg encouraged a student audience to fight in the Palestinian territories. In a tape-recorded speech at Kingston University obtained by the Sunday Times, Begg (who was a Muslim chaplain at Goldsmiths College, part of London University) said: "You want to make jihad? Very good ... Take some money and go to Palestine and fight, fight the terrorists, fight the Zionists." Two years later, he praised Muslims who had travelled abroad to fight enemies of Islam.

A third speech outside the maximum security Belmarsh Prison in south-east London, which holds some of the most dangerous terrorism convicts in the country, was described by the judge as "particularly sinister":

The various core extremist messages which emerge from the claimant's speeches and utterances would, in my view, have been quite clear to the audiences.

The claimant's ostensible cloak of respectability is likely to have made his [extremist] message in these speeches all the more compelling and seductive. For this reason, therefore, his messages would have been all the more effective and dangerous.

It is all too easy for someone in the claimant's position of power and influence as an Imam to plant the seed of Islamic extremism in a young mind, which is then liable to be propagated on the internet."

A spokesman for the BBC said, "We were right to stand by the journalism of the Sunday Politics. The judge has concluded, based on the evidence, that Imam Begg has preached religious violence and an extremist worldview in his remarks." In The Spectator, Douglas Murray wondered how Begg could continue as imam of the Lewisham Islamic Centre.

On 29 October 2016, his mosque released a statement:

We the Trustees of The Lewisham Islamic Centre (LIC) confirm our unequivocal and unwavering continued support of our Head Imam. We reassert that Imam Begg is not an extremist, has never espoused extremist views, nor is he by any stretch of the imagination an extremist speaker ... We are truly disappointed and disturbed by this judgement, by its skew replete with incorrect and fanciful assumptions that rely unequivocally on the speculative, specious and rigid testimony of one “expert” witness - even when this testimony clearly contradicts the Quran and authentic Hadiths of Prophet Muhammed (pbuh) – as representing the myriad of normative Islamic opinions ... We shall continue to review this judgement.

In November 2016, the centre published a response from Begg on their website:

My legal team and I are continuing to study the judgment very carefully and we are considering all options, including an appeal ... In the meantime, it is important for the public, both Muslims and non-Muslims to understand that this is a civil case of defamation, which I pursued to restore my reputation. Even though the ruling has gone in the BBC’s favour, it is important to stress that the BBC and Andrew Neil have not been 'cleared' of anything, and I have not been 'convicted' of anything ... I will be making further comments regarding this issue in the near future.

The case has been cited in legal textbooks. A March 2017 Henry Jackson Society report examined how Begg had established himself as an influential figure within numerous public bodies and groups, even after the court ruling that he was an Islamic extremist. That month, the Citizens UK charity reported itself to the Charity Commission because it had promoted Begg after the court ruling, in breach of the duty of a charity not to promote extremism.

== Preaching and teaching ==
In 2009 Begg preached a sermon, "Neo-Salafi Movement: Is it Obligatory (Fard) to call one's self a Salafi?", which prompted criticism from some Muslim quarters. That year he spoke at a "Heroes of Islam" event supporting Aafia Siddiqui, who had been convicted on two counts of attempted murder. In 2014, Begg wrote about life as an imam in the United Kingdom. The following year, he spoke at the "Citizens Not Subjects" CAGE event and co-signed a letter to the House of Lords concerning a counter-terrorism and security bill.

== See also ==
- Islamic extremism
- Islam and violence
