= Tariq Sheikh (businessman) =

British entrepreneur

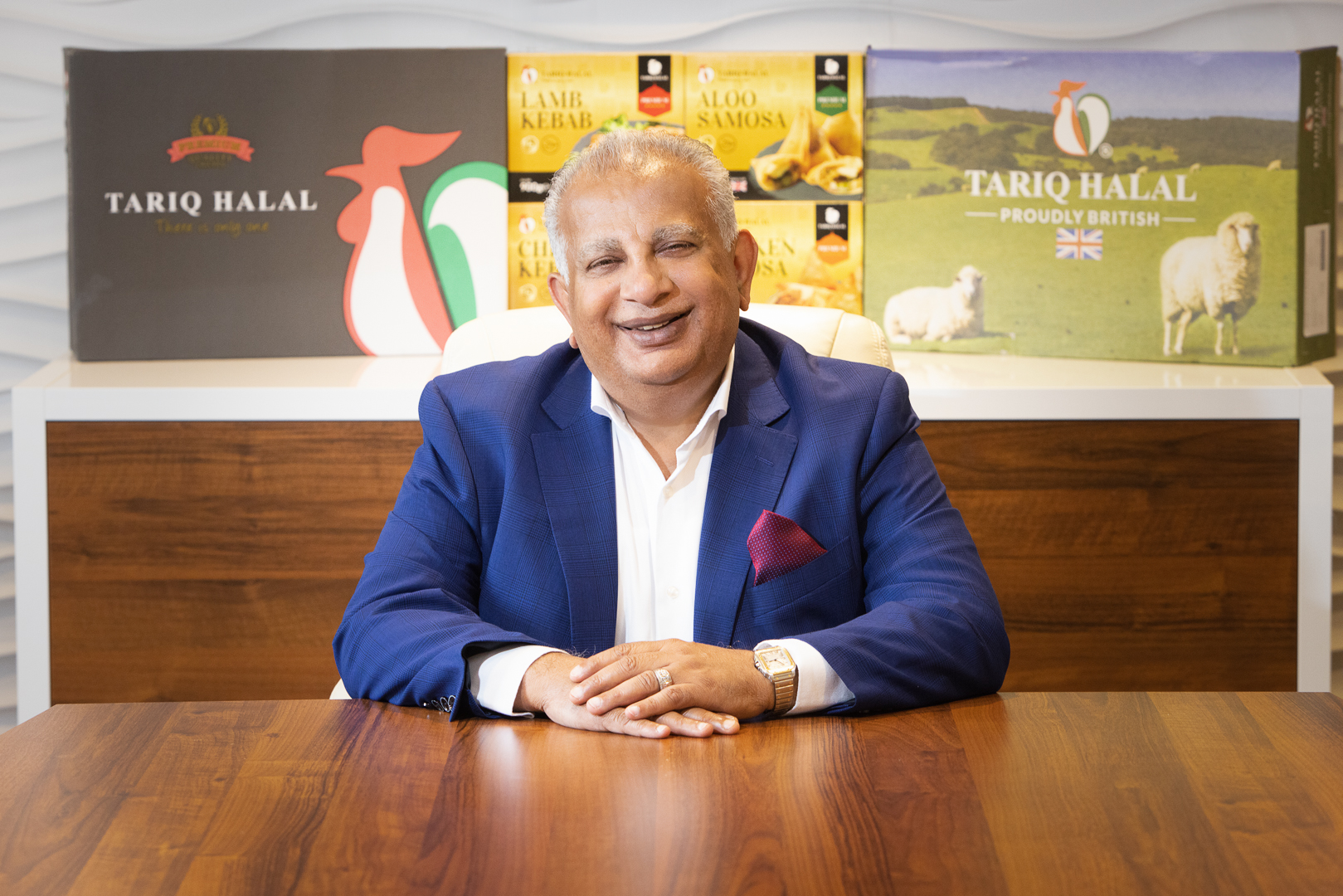
- Tariq Sheikh in 2024
- Born: October 2, 1961 (age 64); Pakistan
- Occupation: Entrepreneur
- Known for: Founder of Tariq Halal Meat
- Spouse: Amina Sheikh
- Children: 4

Tariq Sheikh (born 2 October 1961) is a British entrepreneur. He is the founder of Tariq Halal Meat, a halal meat company in United Kingdom headquartered in London.

== Early life ==
Sheikh was born on 2 October 1961 in Pakistan. In 1965, at the age of four, he moved to the United Kingdom. At the age of 17, Sheikh was initially employed at Huckleberry's and by the age of 19, he was promoted to area manager and supervised multiple stores.

== Career ==
In 1994, Sheikh established Tariq Halal Meat in Southall. The business initially faced difficulties but later expanded into wholesale distribution and introduced its own products. In 2003, Tariq Halal Meat turned over nearly €2.5 million. Sheikh expanded the company to offer products to customers across the UK, Europe and other regions. Domestically, Tariq Halal supplies halal meat to retailers, wholesalers and reportedly operates up to 30 retail stores across the UK. The company's products are reportedly available in more than 300 Sainsbury's locations across the UK.

In 2023, Tariq Halal Meat began exporting British halal meat products to the United Arab Emirates and the Gulf region.

In September 2023, Tariq Halal Meats served as the lead sponsor for the 8th World Halal Food Festival, held at London Stadium, Queen Elizabeth Olympic Park. The festival was reportedly recognized as the largest and longest-running halal food event globally, and took place on the 23rd and 24 September. As part of their sponsorship, Tariq Halal Meats hosted the "Tariq Halal Cookery Theatre," featuring live cooking demonstrations by many chefs and personalities. Notably, Nadiya Hussain conducted a live demo on September 23.

In 2024, Tariq Halal launched what was reported as the world's first drive-thru halal butcher in both the UK and Dubai.

== Personal life ==
Sheikh is married to Amina Sheikh, and they have four daughters, Sofia, Fauzia, Thaira and Saira.

== Philanthropy ==
Sheikh has contributed to the British Asian Trust, the British Heart Foundation and Cancer Foundation. He reportedly supports community and educational projects.

== Recognition ==
- In November 2025, he received the Freedom of the City of London, an honorary recognition conferred by the City of London.
- In October 2024, Sheikh received an honorary doctorate from a Florida-based American university, during the Leaders in London Summit at the Naval & Military Club.
- Sheikh was honored with an Avicenna Medal presented by Prince Philipp of Liechtenstein, in an event at the British House of Lords.
- In 2016, Sheikh won the British Muslim Awards' Businessman of the Year.
