= Farah Bhatti =

British cardiac surgeon

Farah Naz Kausar Bhatti
- Education: Somerville College, Oxford; University of Cambridge
- Awards: Order of the British Empire
- Scientific career
- Thesis: Preclinical strategies in pig-to-primate cardiac xenotransplantation (2004)

Farah Bhatti OBE FRCS FLSW is a British cardiac surgeon who is an honorary professor at the Swansea University Medical School. She serves as Chair of the Royal College of Surgeons of England Women in Surgery Forum. She was appointed an Order of the British Empire in 2020 for services to diversity in the National Health Service in Wales.

== Early life and education ==
Bhatti is of Pakistani heritage. She was born in Birmingham and raised in South London. As a young child, she decided that she wanted to be a doctor. She was an undergraduate student at the University of Oxford, where she studied physiological sciences and specialised in heart related topics. She was a member of Somerville College. She completed a Bachelor of Medicine, Bachelor of Surgery at the University of Cambridge, where she was first introduced to clinical work and operating theatres. Bhatti spent her elective at The Texas Heart Institute, where she became interested in cardiology. She completed several different placements related to surgery (including in orthopaedics, accident and emergency and general surgery) at the Royal Brompton Hospital and Harefield Hospital. Alongside various surgical jobs, Bhatti researched transplantation at the University of Cambridge and was eventually awarded her Doctor of Medicine. She subsequently worked in the North West Anglia NHS Foundation Trust.

== Research and career ==
In 2007 Bhatti became the first British woman of Pakistani origins to be made a cardiac surgeon in the United Kingdom. She was made Honorary Professor of Surgery at the Swansea University Medical School in 2015.

Alongside her clinical work, Bhatti is committed to improving medical education, equity and inclusion in surgery. She serves as Chair of the Royal College of Surgeons of England Women in Surgery Forum, and was the first Muslim woman to be on the council.

== Awards and honours ==
- 2013 Shortlisted for the Asian Women of Achievement Award
- 2015 Swansea University Mary Williams Award
- 2016 Elected Chair of the Royal College of Surgeons of England Women in Surgery Forum
- 2018 Elected to the Council of the Royal College of Surgeons of England
- 2020 Elected to the Order of the British Empire
- 2022 Elected a Fellow of the Learned Society of Wales

== Selected publications ==
- Bhatti, F.; Grayson, A. D.; Grotte, G.; Fabri, B. M.; Au, J.; Jones, M.; Bridgewater, B. (2006-12-01). "The logistic EuroSCORE in cardiac surgery: how well does it predict operative risk?". Heart. 92 (12): 1817–1820. doi:10.1136/hrt.2005.083204. ISSN 1355-6037. PMC 1861312. PMID 16547206.
- Cozzi, Emanuele; Bhatti, Farah; Friend, Peter J. (2000-07-15). "Long-term survival of nonhuman primates receiving life-supporting transgenic porcine kidney xenografts". Transplantation. 70 (1): 15–21. PMID 10919569.
- Zaidi, Afzal; Bhatti, Farah; Friend, Peter J. (1998-06-27). "Life-supporting pig-to-primate renal xenotransplantation using genetically modified donors". Transplantation. 65 (12): 1584–1590. doi:10.1097/00007890-199806270-00008. PMID 9665074.</ref>
