= Frank Khalid =

British entrepreneur (born 1968)

Frank Khalid OBE
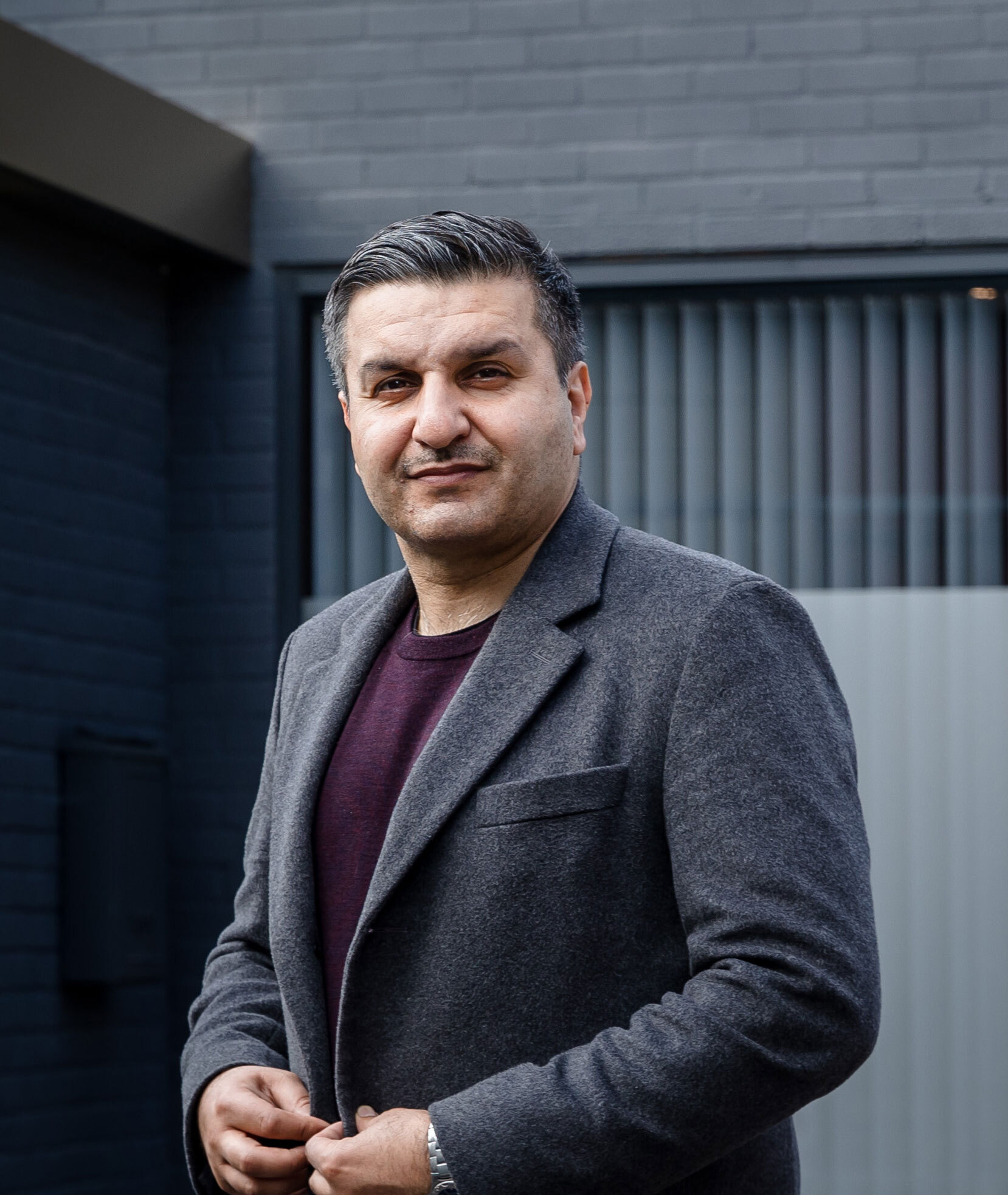
- Khalid in 2022
- Born: Fukhera Khalid; November 22, 1968 (age 57); Surrey
- Occupation: Businessman
- Spouse: Sajida Khalid
- Children: 4
- Website: fkhalid.com

Frank Khalid (born Fukhera Khalid, 22 November 1968) is a British entrepreneur, the owner of West London Film Studios, Elbrook Cash and Carry, and Chak89, Modern Cash and Carry, khalid Modern Industry.

== Early life ==
Khalid was born in Surrey to Pakistani parents, and grew up in Newham, London. He was raised in a high crime rate area and has witnessed the impact of crime as a youth. At the age of 16, he set up his own wholesale unit, learning to do so while helping his father in his shop.

== Career ==
Khalid’s first business was Elbrook Cash and Carry, which he started in 1985. The company grew and another branch was opened in 1993, in Mitcham, London.

Khalid is the owner of three businesses, Elbrook Cash and Carry, Chak89 and West London Film Studios. Films such as Burnt, starring Bradley Cooper and Sienna Miller, and The Mercy, starring Colin Firth, have been shot in his studios in Hayes. After succeeding with his cash and carry business, Khalid bought West London Film Studios. He also closed a deal with actor Mark Wahlberg and rapper P Diddy to be the British distributor of Aquahydrate, their co-owned water brand. Khalid is a shareholder in a sports agency called Touch Sky. He invited Netherlands and Crystal Palace footballer Patrick Van Aanholt, former boxer David Haye, and former Chelsea FC defender Emerson Palmieri to Elbrook Cash and Carry.

Khalid’s Chak89 Restaurant was opened with only a space for 200 people in Mitcham. It is a regular dining place for a number of celebrities including Shah Rukh Khan, Shilpa Shetty, Priyanka Chopra, Mohammed Shami, Deepika Padukone, Akshay Kumar, Rishi Kapoor, Neetu Singh, and Amitabh Bachchan. Other famous people that have paid a visit to Chak89 include American actors Vanessa Hudgens, Lindsay Lohan and Jesse Metcalfe and footballer Willian. Chak89 has hosted Premier League footballers, international actors, TOWIE stars and politicians.

In 2019, Khalid partnered with Diageo and their world famous brand Haig Club.

== Recognition ==
In 2013, he was honoured with the British Community Honours Award at the House of Lords in recognition of his outstanding contribution and services to the community. He also received a Lifetime Achievement Award – Asian Curry Awards. In October 2019, he was ranked at number 101 on the GG2 Power List of the most influential Asian people in Britain.

Khalid was appointed Officer of the Order of the British Empire (OBE) in the 2023 New Year Honours for services to Business, to Charity and to the community in North London. Soon after in January 2023 he was further honoured by being awarded the Freedom of the City of London.

== Personal life ==
Khalid is married to Sajida Khalid and has four children. Khalid's second son, Imran, was diagnosed as autistic which inspired him to start holding dinners in aid of autism charities. He had triple bypass surgery in 2018. Khalid is a supporter of the English football club Chelsea.
