= Mohammed Amin (businessman) =

British businessman

Mohammed Amin MBE FRSA
- Education: Clare College, Cambridge
- Occupations: Businessman, Chairman of the Conservative Muslim Forum

Mohammed Amin is a British Pakistani businessman who was Chairman of the Conservative Muslim Forum, an affiliated group within the British Conservative Party, from mid-2014 until June 2019, when he was reported to have been expelled from the group following his public criticism of the 'moral integrity' of Boris Johnson. He resigned from the Conservative Party on 23 July 2019 when Johnson was announced as the new leader as he regarded him as morally unfit to be Party Leader or Prime Minister. He writes regularly about political and community cohesion issues on the ConservativeHome website.

In October 2019 he joined the Liberal Democrats.

== Early life and education ==
Amin is of Pakistani descent has lived in the UK since 1952. He graduated in mathematics from Clare College, Cambridge, then obtained a Post Graduate Certificate in Education from the University of Leeds. He is a chartered accountant and a fellow of the Chartered Institute of Taxation. He served on the Council for 12 years, standing down in 2015. In 2005 he became a Fellow of the Royal Society of Arts.

== Professional career ==
Amin was the first Muslim partner of Price Waterhouse UK, now PricewaterhouseCoopers. He was elected to PwC's Supervisory Board from 2003 to 2009. Before his retirement at the end of 2009, Amin was PwC's head of Islamic finance in the UK.

== Social work ==
Amin is Co-Chair of the Muslim Jewish Forum of Greater Manchester, Chairman of the Council of the Islam & Liberty Network, and Chair of Donors of the Curriculum for Cohesion. He speaks and writes regularly on Islamic finance and on issues connected with politics and social cohesion. Clare College, Cambridge chose him as its Alumnus of the Year for 2014. He was awarded an MBE in the Queen's Birthday Honours List June 2016 "For services to Community Cohesion and Inter-faith Relations in Greater Manchester."

== See also ==
- Pakistan–United Kingdom relations
- Islamophobia in the UK Conservative Party#Calls for an independent inquiry
