= Conservative Muslim Forum =

Group within the British Conservative Party

The Conservative Muslim Forum is a group within the British Conservative Party. It aims to increase Conservative Party's knowledge and comprehension of issues and circumstances that have particular relevance to Muslim communities and develop suitable responses. It also seeks to increase support for the Conservative Party within the Muslim community. Anyone who is eligible to vote in British general or local elections regardless of race, colour or creed may become a member of the Conservative Muslim Forum. It will however be necessary for a person applying for membership of the Conservative Muslim Forum to be an existing member of the Conservative Party or apply for such membership simultaneously.

Baron Sheikh founded the Conservative Muslim Forum in 2005. Baron Sheikh served as the Conservative Muslim Forum's Chairman until 2014 when the Deputy Chairman, Mohammed Amin, became the new Chairman. Mohammed Amin continued as Chairman until June 2019 when he was expelled from the Conservative Muslim Forum following his strong public criticism of the 'moral integrity' of Boris Johnson. Members of the Executive Committee are listed on the Conservative Muslim Forum website.

== Objectives ==
The Conservative Muslim Forum's objectives, as set out on its website are:

1. Engage with Muslims of all persuasions and encourage them to participate in political life at all levels, from grassroots to Parliament.
2. Engage with Muslims and all other communities and encourage them to support and vote for the Conservative Party.
3. Undertake campaigning for the Conservative Party at elections and other times.
4. Encourage Muslims to make effective and positive contributions to the development of an inclusive and cohesive society in the United Kingdom.
5. Work to maintain and build bridges with all communities and religions within the United Kingdom.
6. Strive to maintain unity, brotherhood, tolerance and goodwill between all persuasions of Muslims and with the wider community and strengthen its social and cultural heritage.
7. Collate factual information on issues and circumstances relevant to Muslims of all persuasions in the UK.
8. Create an enabling environment to influence policy development from within the Conservative Party and safeguard the interests of Muslims.
9. Strive to improve the quality of life of all Muslims through addressing issues including health, education, women's issues, disability, integration and mentorship of prospective Parliamentary and other candidates within the Conservative Party's wider objectives.

== Policies ==
The Conservative Muslim Forum has a page on its website setting out its "Approach to policy positions." It tells readers that a review of the Forum's website pages "will show very few that have any policy aspects. You will also see that those which do touch on policy matters seek to be consistent with the policy of the Conservative party."

Notwithstanding the above, the Conservative Muslim Forum supports the right to Halal and Kosher slaughter and that wearing niqab and burqa should not be prohibited by the state except where special considerations apply such as security.

When the UK Government announced the results of its review of the Prevent strategy, the Conservative Muslim Forum issued a statement supporting the conclusions of the review.

The Conservative Muslim Forum encourages "Muslims to be involved with all of the organisations that provide an opportunity to serve our society" and has links to the Army, Royal Air Force and Royal Navy recruitment websites on its own website.

In June 2018, the Conservative Muslim Forum accused the Conservative Party of a failure to take action on Islamophobia and joined calls made by the Muslim Council of Britain for an independent inquiry into the issue. In addition, 350 mosques and 11 umbrella organisations across the UK have urged the Conservatives to launch internal inquiry into Islamophobia claims.

== Parliamentary mentions ==
On 23 February 2015, the House of Commons held a Westminster Hall debate in response to an e-petition, with Philip Hollobone, the Conservative MP for Kettering moving "That this House has considered the e-petition relating to ending non-stun slaughter to promote animal welfare." During the debate, at 5.35pm Richard Harrington, the Conservative MP for Watford, mentioned that there was a counter e-petition: "However, the chairman of the Conservative Muslim Forum, Mohammed Amin, had a counter-petition called 'Protect religious slaughter in the UK and EU', which has received 125,000 signatures."

== Criticism ==
In 2007, the Conservative Muslim Forum was criticised by some commentators: the organisation claimed that British relations with Israel could "damage Britain’s relationships with 1.5 billion Muslims worldwide, including those in Britain," and calls on the party to be more sympathetic towards Iran's nuclear ambitions.

Melanie Phillips, a columnist for the Daily Mail newspaper and The Spectator magazine, has said of its report An Unquiet World: A Response, that, "The recent paper written for the Tories by the Conservative Muslim Forum is a deeply troubling document. Set up to provide a dialogue with Britain's Muslims and advise on tackling Islamist extremism, the group merely demonstrated depressingly that it shares many of the culturally belligerent attitudes driving that extremism."

Nile Gardiner, in the National Review Online criticized the same report, suggesting that it "openly appeases Islamic radicalism." Gardiner said in the same article that, "The establishment of the Conservative Muslim Forum is a dangerous flirtation with Islamic extremism that should be brought to an end."

== See also ==
- Conservative Middle East Council
