= Ousmane =

Ousmane is a French-Arabic surname and male given name common in West Africa. It is derived from the Arabic name Uthman through Osman. People named Ousmane include:

== Given name ==
- Ousmane Ba (born 2002), Senegalese football goalkeeper
- Ousmane Barro (born 1984), Senegalese professional basketball player
- Ousmane Barry (born 1991), Guinean football centre forward
- Ousmane Bangoura (born 1979), Guinean football midfielder
- Ousmane Camara (disambiguation)
- Ousmane Coulibaly (born 1989), French-Mali former footballer
- Ousmane Cisse (born 1982), Malian professional basketball player
- Ousmane Dabo (born 1977), French football midfielder
- Ousmane Dembélé (born 1997), French footballer
- Ousmane Dieng (born 2003), French professional basketball player
- Ousmane Diomande (born 2003), Ivorian football centre back
- Ousmane Issoufi Maïga (born 1945), former Prime Minister of Mali
- Ousmane Kamissoko (born 1998), Malian football forward
- Ousmane Kanté (born 1989) French-Guinean football defender
- Ousmane Keita (born 1994), Malian football defender
- Ousmane Kone (born 1972), Malian government minister and politician
- Ousmane Mane (born 1990), Senegalese football goalkeeper
- Ousmane N'Diaye (basketball), (born 2004) Senegalese basketball player
- Ousmane N'Diaye (footballer), (born 1991), Senegalese footballer
- Ousmane N'Gom Camara (born 1975), Guinean football midfielder
- Ousmane Niang (born 1980), Senegalese sprinter
- Ousmane Sanou (born 1978), Burkinabé football striker
- Ousmane Sembène (1923-2007), Senegalese film director, producer and writer
- Ousmane Socé (1911-1974), writer, politician, and one of the first Senegalese novelists
- Ousmane Sonko, (born 1974), Prime Minister of Senegal since 2024
- Ousmane Soumah (born 1973), Guinean former football striker
- Ousmane Sow (footballer) (born 2000), Senegalese footballer
- Ousmane Sow (sculptor) (1935-2016), Senegalese sculpture artist
- Ousmane Sy (born 1949), Malian politician
- Ousmane Sylla (Burkinabé footballer) (born 1991)
- Ousmane Sylla (Senegalese footballer) (born 2001)
- Ousmane Tanor Dieng (born 1948), President of the parliamentary group of the Socialist Party of Senegal
- Ousmane Tounkara (born 1973), Polish-born Canadian gridiron football player
- Ousmane Touré (footballer) (born 2005), French football centre back
- Ousmane Touré (swimmer) (born 2002), Malian swimmer
- Ousmane Traoré (born 1977), Burkinabé former football defender
- Ousmane Viera (born 1986), Ivorian former football centre-back
- Ousmane Zeidine Ahmeye (born 1994), Nigerien football forward
- Ousmane Zongo (1960-2003), Burkinabé arts trader

== Surname ==
- Abdoulaye Ousmane (born 2000), French football centre-back
- Mahamane Ousmane (born 1950), Nigerien political figure

== See also ==
- Ousman, another given name and surname
