= Osman Nuri =

Osman Nuri may refer to:

- Osman Nuri Eralp (1876–1940), Turkish veterinarian
- Osman Nuri Koptagel (1874–1942), officer in the Ottoman Army and general in the Turkish Army
- Osman Nuri Örek (1925–1999), Turkish Cypriot politician of the Turkish Republic of Northern Cyprus
- Osman Nuri Pasha (disambiguation), various people
- Osman Nuri Tekeli (1893–date of death unknown), Turkish bureaucrat
- Osman Nuri Topbaş (born 1942), Turkish Sufi leader and author

== See also ==
- Osman (name)
