= Osman Nuri Pasha (disambiguation) =

Osman Nuri Pasha is commonly known as Gazi Osman Pasha.

Osman Nuri Pasha may also refer to:

- Osman Nuri Pasha (painter) (1830s–1906), Ottoman painter and military officer
- Osman Nuri Koptagel (1874–1942), officer of the Ottoman Army and a general of the Turkish Army

== See also ==
- Osman Nuri (disambiguation)
- Osman Pasha (disambiguation)
- Gaziosmanpaşa (disambiguation)
- Osman (name)
