= Ossman =

Ossman is a surname. Notable people with the surname include:

- David Ossman (born 1936), American writer and comedian
- Vess Ossman (1868–1923), American banjoist

== See also ==
- Osman (name)
