= Uthman (name) =

Uthman عثمان
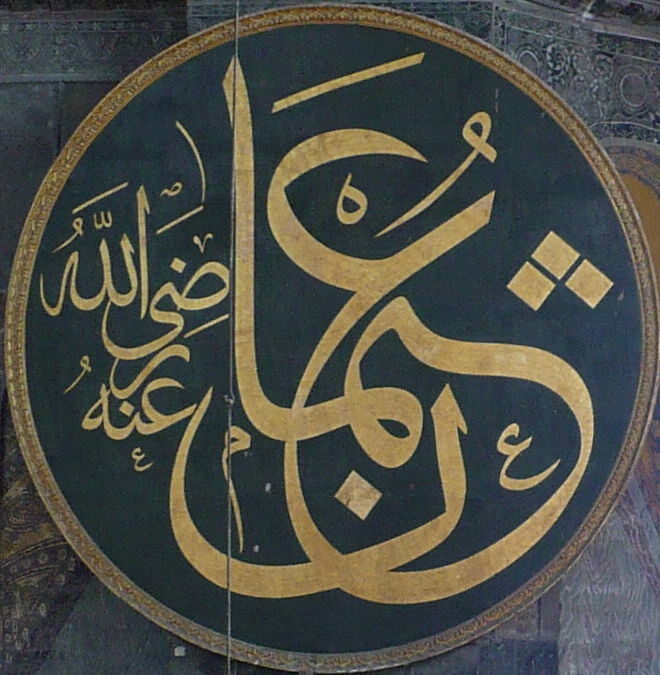
- Calligraphic seal featuring Caliph Uthman's name, on display in the Hagia Sophia
- Gender: Male

Origin
- Origin: Arabic
- Meaning: young bustard, young serpent
- Region of origin: Arabia

Other names
- Variant forms: Uthman (Arabic: عُثمَان); Osman (Turkic); Usman (Persian, Urdu); Osman (Bosnian); Ousmane (Francophone West Africa)

Uthman (Arabic: عُثمَانُ, romanized: Uṯmānᵘ), also spelled Othman, is a male Arabic given name with the literal meaning of a young bustard, serpent, or dragon. It is popular as a male given name among Muslims. It is also transliterated as Osman or Usman, particularly when the name occurs in languages which either have no /θ/ sound or where the character ⟨ﺙ⟩ is pronounced differently, such as Persian, Bosnian, Turkish, and Urdu, as well as some Arabic dialects.

Originally the name often occurred as a nasab or patronymic in the names of children of people called Uthman, as in ibn Uthman "Son of Uthman" or bint Uthman "Daughter of Uthman". From there, it also developed into a surname.

== Given name ==
- Uthman, third Rashidun caliph and son-in-law of the prophet Muhammad
- Abu Quhafa, father of Abu Bakr
- Uthman ibn Ali, one of the sons of Ali
- Uthman ibn Naissa, a.k.a. Munuza, a Berber Wāli of Narbonne and effective Muslim governor of Septimania
- Uthman ibn Abd al-Haqq, a Marinid ruler
- Abu 'Amr 'Uthman, a Hafsid ruler
- Uthman ibn Ali (bey of Tunis), the sixth leader of the Husainid Dynasty and the ruler of Tunisia briefly in 1814
- Uthman ibn Abi al-Ula, Marinid Prince
- Othman Al Omeir, a Saudi-born British businessman, journalist and editor
- Othman Bidin (born 1913), Bruneian educator
- Othman Moqbel (born 1968), British-Palestinian non-profit executive
- Othman Saat, a former Chief Minister of the state of Johor in Malaysia
- Othmane Senadjki, a former journalist and editor-in-chief in Algeria
- Othman Uking (born 1937), Bruneian legislative councillor
- Othman Wok (1924–2017), Singaporean politician

== Middle name ==
- Al-Aziz Uthman, the second son of Saladin and the second Ayyubid Sultan of Egypt
- Azalina Othman Said, a tourism minister of Malaysia

== Surname and patronymic ==
- Abdul Ghani Othman, Menteri Besar of the state of Johor in Malaysia
- Abdul Kahar bin Othman, a Singaporean criminal executed for drug trafficking in Singapore
- Abdullatif bin Ahmed Al Othman, the governor of Saudi Arabian General Investment Authority (SAGIA)
- Arwa Othman, Yemeni writer, journalist, human rights activist and former Minister of Culture
- Tuanku Sultan Otteman II, a former Sultan of Deli
- Barbara Uthmann, businesswoman and supporter of bobbin lace
- Uthman ibn Hunaif, Companions of the Prophet

== Fiction ==
- Othman, a fictional historical character in the Christopher Paolini book Inheritance.

== See also ==
- Ottoman Empire
- Uthman Qur'an
- Usman Institute of Technology
- Usmanu Danfodio University
- Osmanya script
- Osmania University
- Saidina Uthman Bin Affan Mosque
