= Ousman =

Ousman may refer to:

== Given name ==
- Ousman Badjie (born 1967), Gambian lieutenant-general and former chief of the Defence Staff of the Gambia
- Ousman Jabang (born 2001), American professional soccer player
- Ousman Jallow (born 1988), Gambian football striker
- Ousman Jammeh (born 1953), Gambian politician
- Ousman Rambo Jatta (born 1969), Gambian politician
- Ousman Joof (born 2000), Gambian football midfielder
- Ousman Koli (born 1988), Gambian retired football defender
- Ousman Krubally (born 1988), American-Gambian basketball player
- Ousman Maheshe (born 2002), Congolese football forward playing in Canada
- Ousman Marong (born 1999), Gambian football midfielder
- Ousman Miangoto (born 1954), former middle-distance runner from Chad
- Ousman Nyan (born 1975), Norwegian retired football midfielder
- Ousman Sey (died 2012), Gambian man who died in German police custody
- Ousman Sonko (born 1969), Gambian politician, former Interior Minister

== Surname ==
- Ismaila Ousman (born 1997), Cameroonian football midfielder
- Larmin Ousman (born 1981), Liberian football defender

== See also ==
- Ousmane, another given name and surname
