= Adam Kelwick =

English-Yemeni Muslim chaplain and aid worker

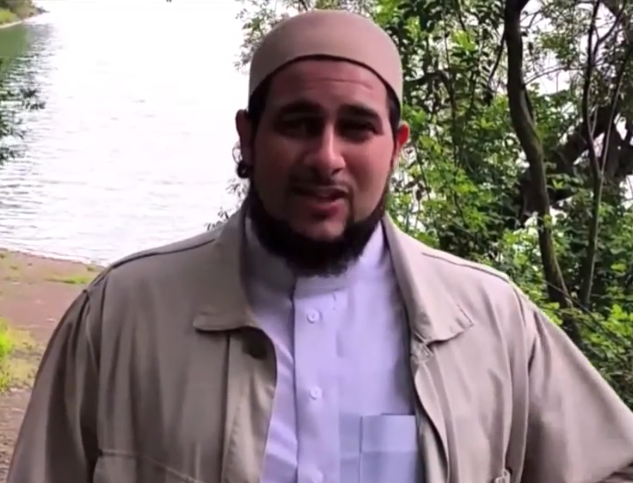
- Born: 1982-1983; South Yorkshire
- Known for: British Muslim chaplain and Syria Relief aid worker

Adam Kelwick is a British Muslim chaplain and humanitarian aid worker.

== Southport stabbings ==
He achieved national prominence in August 2024 in the aftermath of the Southport stabbings.

Hostile crowds gathered outside the Abdullah Quilliam Mosque in Liverpool, but once the situation had calmed, Adam Kelwick and other worshippers took food to those present. Images of 'beautiful interactions' between Muslims and protesters went viral.

Kelwick subsequently received a Beacon Mosque Award for his actions.

== Charitable activity and work in Yemen ==
He was previously best known for his work representing the British Muslim community and on the humanitarian situation in Yemen.

He has conducted humanitarian aid work in Yemen, Lebanon, Syria, Calais and Somalia.

In 2019 Kelwick founded a company producing honey in Yemen and distributing it internationally.

== Personal life ==
Kelwick was born in South Yorkshire. Aged 16, Kelwick met his birth father for the first time and was introduced to the Quran.

As of January 2018 Kelwick had lived in Liverpool for almost 18 years, serving in such roles as the Muslim chaplain for Merseyside Police and the High Sheriff of Merseyside.
