= Human Appeal =

British development and relief charity

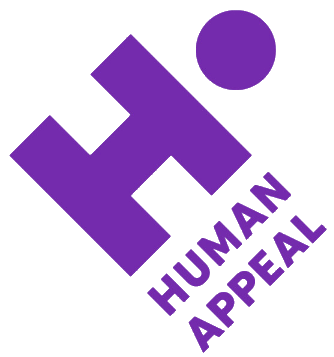
- Founded: 1991; 35 years ago
- Founded at: Manchester, England
- Type: International NGO
- Purpose: List: Conflict Zones; Sustainable Livelihoods; Education; Health & Nutrition; Orphans and Child Welfare; Water Sanitation & Hygiene; Emergency Relief; Integrated Development; Reach Deployments
- Headquarters: Manchester
- Location: 1 Cheadle Point, Carrs Road, Cheadle, England SK8 2BL
- Region served: Worldwide
- CEO: Dr Mohammed Ashmawey
- Website: www.humanappeal.org.uk

Human Appeal is a British international development and relief charity based in Manchester. It was established in 1991. It runs targeted poverty relief programmes in emergency response and sustainable development.

In the past, the charity was known as Human Appeal International but was rebranded in 2018. It is now known as Human Appeal.

According to The Telegraph, the organisation is related to UAE-based Human Appeal International, which has been accused of having ties with Hamas. Human Appeal "categorically" denied any link to Hamas, and the Charity Commission confirmed that in 2015 Human Appeal was not "under any investigation".

== Offices ==
Human Appeal has offices in the UK (Manchester, London, Birmingham and Leicester), France, Spain and Ireland. The charity also has a US office in Dallas, Texas. Human Appeal said that it is a separate organisation to Human Appeal UAE. According to The Telegraph, however, the two charities are divisions of the same organisation.

== Executive staff ==
In May 2018, Othman Moqbel was dismissed as chief executive of Human Appeal, following his suspension by the charity in late 2017 and an independent auditor’s investigation into financial irregularities (the auditor recommended Moqbel’s dismissal), and a disciplinary hearing based on evidence from what the charity referred to as an "exhaustive inquiry", for mismanaging the charity’s funds and for a number of his acts and omissions that were found to be gross misconduct. Moqbel withdrew his appeal to an employment tribunal in 2020.

In April 2019, Human Appeal appointed Dr Mohamed Ashmawey as chief executive. He was given the "Humanitarian Hero of the Year Award 2022" at the annual global humanitarian conference AIDEX, in Brussels, Belgium in November 2022.

== Memberships and partnerships ==
Human Appeal is a member of Bond (a UK membership body for non-governmental organisations working in international development) and of the Muslim Charities Forum (an umbrella organisation for UK-based Muslim-led charities).

== Projects ==
Since 2011, Human Appeal has been a supporter of refugees of the Syrian civil war. In February 2018, Human Appeal called for immediate ceasefire in Eastern Ghouta and pointed out the devastating situation of civilians in the area. In early 2016 the Isle of Man donated £30,000 to support Human Appeal's work on the island of Lesbos, which has become a main access point of Syrian refugees arriving in Europe.

In March 2016 Human Appeal completed a three-month project during which four Gaza universities were rebuilt and £227,000 contributed. In August 2017 Human Appeal was awarded over £4.3 million by the UNHCR in order to distribute help in Mosul, Iraq after the liberation from ISIS.

After the floods in North England, Bradford City Council was supported during the clearing up process in late 2015. In January 2016 Human Appeal worked with the Slough Khidman Community Trust providing winter survival kits. In October 2016, Human Appeal announced the Wrap Up Manchester campaign asking the Greater Manchester public to donate unwanted winter coats to help people in need through the cold months. As part of their winter appeal, Human Appeal organised The Comedy Show which toured in December 2016.

Human Appeal was named "Charity of the Year" at the 2017 British Muslim Awards for their achievements and contribution to British society.

In summer 2017, Human Appeal launched an appeal for the victims of the Manchester Arena bombing, raising £27,000 in a matter of days and earning their then CEO, Othman Moqbel, the honour of being named one of the "Muslim Heroes of Manchester" by the Evening Standard.

The organisation raised and contributed over £114,000 for those affected by the 2017 Grenfell Tower fire.

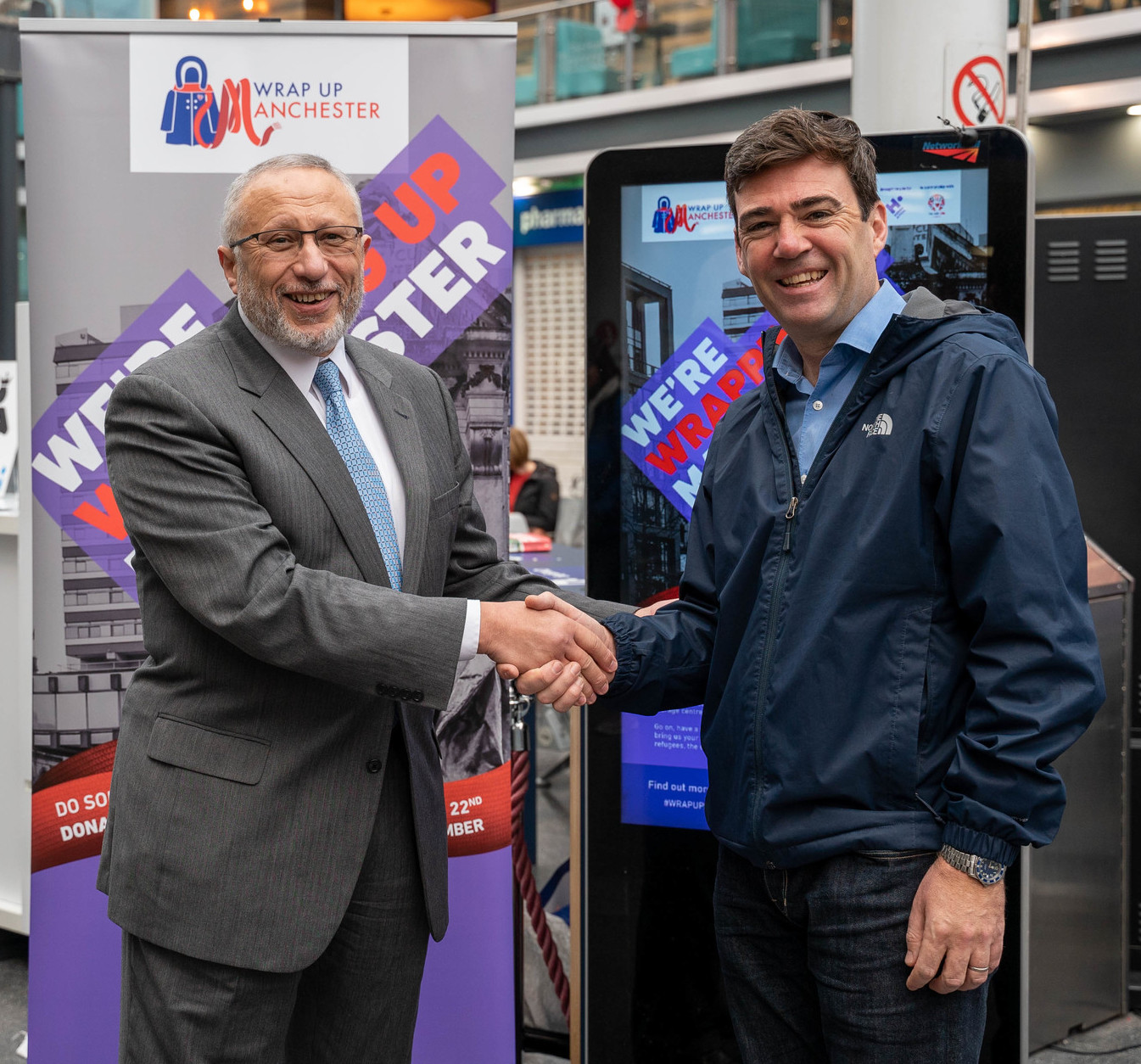
Andy Burnham (right), Mayor of Greater Manchester, visits the 2019 winter coat collection and meets Human Appeal CEO Mohamed Ashmawey

In November 2019, for the fifth year, the Wrap Up Manchester campaign project ran in partnership with Human Appeal. With drop-off locations across the UK, the project collects unwanted coats and funds and donates them to charities that support people fleeing domestic violence, children living in poverty, refugees and the homeless. In 2018, over 30,000 coats were donated in London, Birmingham and Manchester.

During the COVID-19 pandemic, the organisation worked with boxer Amir Khan; with Liam Byrne MP and with Claudia Webbe MP to promote relief efforts. The organisation worked to deliver food to key workers and people in need during the emergency.

Human Appeal published a report Risking Death to Give Birth: The consequences of conflict on the health needs of women and girls in Syria on nine years of the Syrian conflict.

In January 2022, Human Appeal joined with the US humanitarian organisation Globus Relief to undertake healthcare projects in northwest Syria and Iraq.

In April 2022, Human Appeal worked with Globus Relief to deliver civilian shelters, together with medical supplies worth £1.5 million, to Ukraine, following the Russian invasion of Ukraine. The temporary shelters are to be operated by the Ukrainian Muslim Women's League, a local NGO.

Working from Gaziantep, Turkey after the 2023 Turkey–Syria earthquake, Human Appeal provided medical aid, water and 30,000 meals. Human Appeal's own Al Imaan Hospital in Syria was damaged by the earthquake, but was able to continue to function.

In 2025, the group helped with relief efforts following the deadly 2025 Myanmar earthquake.

The charity made a feature-length documentary film, Pot of Gold, in partnership with Chief Productions, about its work with beekeepers in Kashmir, Pakistan. The film was awarded "Best Documentary Feature" at the 10th Manchester Film Festival in March 2025.

== Alleged extremist ties ==
Human Appeal International, a UAE-based organisation which is related to the British Human Appeal according to The Telegraph, had ties with extremists. It was included as a Hamas front in a 1996 CIA report on charitable organizations that finance terror. In 2003, the FBI said Human Appeal International had a "close relationship" with Hamas. The US State Department, in leaked cables from 2003, also associated Human Appeal International with Hamas and said that "members of its field offices in Bosnia, Kosovo, and Chechnya had connections to al-Qaeda associates".

In 2012, after the counter-extremism unit in the Department of Education intervened, the UK-based Human Appeal International were banned from an event at a Manchester school. They co-hosted an event in July 2011 event at Brent Town Hall in north London with Hamas supporters. The name and address of the charity were posted on the Union of Good's official website as a member. Human Appeal denied the connection.

In 2008, Israel listed Human Appeal International as a banned association due to links with Union of Good and alleged fundraising for Hamas. The Nine Eleven Finding Answers Foundation said Human Appeal, along with other British Muslim charities, was an early participant in the Union of Good, an international network designated a terrorist organisation by the US in 2008. The UK Charity Commission interviewed spoke to involved charities in 2009, confirmed with them they were not members, and closed its investigation.

Alleged links to the funding of terrorism made by the Jewish Chronicle in 2012 were withdrawn and an apology was issued in May 2013 after the allegations were deemed untrue and damages paid.

== Awards and nominations ==
In 2013, Human Appeal was awarded the International Charity Award at Global Peace and Unity.

In January 2015, Human Appeal was nominated for the Charity of the Year award at the British Muslim Awards.

In January 2017, Human Appeal was awarded Charity of the Year at the British Muslim Awards for their outstanding achievements and contribution to British society.

Human Appeal was shortlisted in the Charity Times Awards 2022, under the "Change Project of the Year" category.

== Supporters ==
UK Prime Minister Sir Keir Starmer, Rabbi Laura Janner-Klausner, Anna Soubry, MP Kate Green, MP Shabana Mahmood, and Sir Graham Brady have all supported Human Appeal.
