= Othman Moqbel =

British non-profit executive (born 1968)

Othman Moqbel (born July 1968) is a British-Palestinian non-profit executive. He is currently CEO of Action For Humanity, the parent charity of Syria Relief, which describes itself as the largest Syria-focused NGO in the UK. He was CEO of Human Appeal from 2010 to 2017, when he was sacked for mismanaging the charity’s funds and for gross misconduct.

== Education and early career ==
Moqbel earned his BA and MA in Islamic Studies from the University of Jordan (Amman). He also holds a certificate from the 8-day Muslim chaplaincy course at the Markfield Institute of Higher Education (Leicester). He served as president of the Federation of Student Islamic Societies in the UK and Ireland (FOSIS), and as a facilitator for youth leadership and development courses with the Muslim Student Trust.

== Human Appeal ==
Othman Moqbel was the CEO of the Manchester, UK based NGO, Human Appeal from 2010 until May 2018. In 2013 the Jewish Chronicle paid an undisclosed amount of libel damages to Moqbel and two trustees of Human Appeal after accusing the organization of having ties to terrorism. In 2015, an article in The Telegraph claimed Moqbel and Human Appeal had links to Hamas; Human Appeal “categorically” denied this and the Charity Commission said that Human Appeal was not “under any investigation”.

During his time there Human Appeal established new programmes in the UK and worked in 25 countries worldwide. Projects in 2017 saw an increase in beneficiaries as well as development programmes. In 2017, Moqbel was nominated for the BOND Humanitarian Award. Moqbel and Human Appeal launched an appeal for the victims of the 2017 Manchester Arena terrorist attack. Moqbel emphasised that no matter what background, faith, religion, ethnicity – everybody must stand united against anyone who wants to divide people. While working for Human Appeal, Moqbel was concurrently both a trustee and treasurer of the Muslim Charities Forum.

=== Dismissal ===
In May 2018, Othman Moqbel was dismissed as chief executive, following his suspension in late 2017 and an independent auditor’s investigation into financial irregularities (the auditor recommended Moqbel’s dismissal), and a disciplinary hearing based on evidence from what the charity referred to as an "exhaustive inquiry", for mismanaging the charity’s funds and for a number of his acts and omissions that were found to be gross misconduct. He was also placed on a "temporary leave of absence" from the board of the Association of Chief Executives of Voluntary Organisations (ACEVO), a membership body for the leaders of charity organisations in England and Wales, and resigned the following year. Moqbel withdrew his appeal to an employment tribunal in 2020.

== Action For Humanity ==
Othman Moqbel is CEO of Action For Humanity, who are the parent charity of Syria Relief. He and the company rebranded in order to reach beyond Syria and have a more international presence.,
