= National Defence University of Malaysia =

Military university in Malaysia

Coordinates: 3°8′8″N 101°41′16″E

- Universiti Pertahanan Nasional Malaysia
- Seal
- Former name: Akademi Tentera Malaysia (ATMA)
- Motto: Kewajipan, Maruah, Integriti
- Motto in English: Duty, Honour, Integrity
- Type: Public
- Established: March 8, 1995; 31 years ago (as Akademi Tentera Malaysia); November 10, 2006; 19 years ago (as Universiti Pertahanan Nasional Malaysia)
- Affiliations: Malaysian Armed Forces
- Chancellor: Yang di-Pertuan Agong Sultan Ibrahim Iskandar of Johor
- Vice-Chancellor: Lieutenant General Datuk Arman Rumaizi Ahmad
- Commandant: Brigadier General Dato' Mohamad Noorlizam bin Shamsuddin
- Location: Kem Sungai Besi, 57000, Kuala Lumpur, Malaysia
- Campus: Sungai Besi Camp
- Colours: Dark blue, red, and cyan
- Website: www.upnm.edu.my

The National Defence University of Malaysia (NDUM; Malay: Universiti Pertahanan Nasional Malaysia abbreviated as UPNM) is a military university located in Sungai Besi Camp, Kuala Lumpur, Malaysia.

Established in 1995 as the Malaysian Armed Forces Academy (Malay: Akademi Tentera Malaysia) before upgraded into university status and assumed its present name in 2006, the university is Malaysia's first catering to the needs and development of the Malaysian Armed Forces. There are around 2,700 undergraduate students, with over 890 of them Officer Cadets that undergo four to five years of training.

== History ==
UPNM was originally Akademi Tentera Malaysia (ATMA), or the Malaysian Armed Forces Academy, which was established on 8 March 1995 and began operations on 1 June. It was an organisation that offered bachelor's degrees in the fields of engineering, sciences and managements, with military training.

The bachelor's degree courses were accredited and awarded by Universiti Teknologi Malaysia in the beginning. The lecturers came from within the armed forces, some hired by the academy and the rest deputised by UTM.

=== 2000s ===
On 10 November 2006, ATMA was upgraded to university status creating the current UPNM. The establishment of the university was announced by the Prime Minister Datuk Seri Abdullah Ahmad Badawi during the Budget 2007 reading in the Malaysian Parliament. The setting up of the university cost RM 500 million and was fully borne by the Government of Malaysia.

The university's first intake of students was for the 2007/2008 session.

=== 2010s ===
On 1 June 2017, the university was embroiled in a controversy following the murder case of 20-year-old military cadet officer Zulfarhan Osman Zulkarnain who succumbed from grave injuries by bullying of several other dormmates.

== Campus ==
=== Location ===
UPNM's main campus is at the Sungai Besi Camp in Kuala Lumpur. The campus was completed in 2002 as part of ATMA.

== Chancellory ==
The former Commandant of ATMA, Lt. General Dato' Wira Ir. Ismail Samion was appointed as the first vice-chancellor of UPNM. His appointment created history in the Malaysian higher education scene as the first military personnel appointed to be vice-chancellor of a local university. Ismail was Commandant of ATMA for six years prior to the appointment.

The current Vice-Chancellor is Lt Jen Datuk Wira Arman Rumaizi Bin Hj Ahmad who appointed to the post in 2025.

- ATMA Commandants/UPNM Vice-Chancellor

Name	Tenure	
Lt. Gen. Dato' Ismail Hassan	1995–1996	ATMA
Maj. Gen. Dato' Abd Ghani Yunus	1996–1997	ATMA
Brig. Gen. Baharudin Abdul Kadir	1997–1997	ATMA
Brig. Gen. Dato' Adenan Mohamad Zain	1998–2001	ATMA
Brig. Gen. Azizan Ariffin	2001-2002	ATMA
Lt. Gen. Dato' Wira Ir. Ismail Samion	2002–2008	NDUM
Lt. Gen. Dato Pahlawan Zulkifli Zainal Abidin	2008–2010	NDUM
Lt. Gen. Dato' Wira Allatif bin Mohamed Noor	2010–2013	NDUM
General Tan Sri Zulkifli Zainal Abidin	2013–2018	NDUM
Lt. Gen. Dato' Abdul Halim Jalal	2018–2021	NDUM
Lt. Gen. Dato’ Hasagaya Abdullah	2021–2023	NDUM
Lt. Gen. Datuk Mardzuki Muhammad	2023–2025	NDUM
Lt. Gen. Datuk Arman Rumaizi Ahmad	2025–Present	NDUM

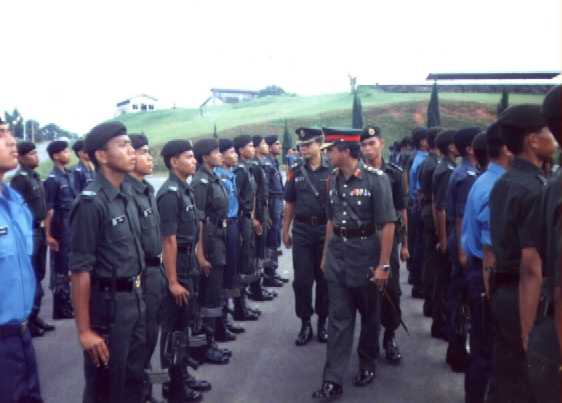
Lt Jen Dato' Ismail Hassan inspecting the parade

== Curriculum ==
Cadets are educated and graded on their performance in academics, physical fitness, and military leadership.

The academic programme consists of a core of 11 courses balanced in management, sciences and engineering. Cadets choose their courses in the end of their foundation year.

The physical programme includes physical education classes and competitive athletics. Every cadet participates in an intercollegiate, club or intramural (called Inter-Battalion Sports) level sport each year. As with all soldiers in the Armed Forces, cadets also must pass a physical fitness test (UKA) twice per year. Additionally, during each end year-session, cadets must undergo Single Service Training (LKPT)—which generally is regarded by cadets to be the "worst 6 weeks of the year."

Cadets learn military skills, including leadership, through a military program (LKU) that begins on their first day at the university. Most military training takes place during the end-semester holiday, with new cadets undergoing Cadet Basic Training (LFI) — or "Square bashing". Additionally, cadets are housed in barracks style floor-by-floor management at accommodation blocks and have leadership positions and responsibilities throughout the academic year.

Every mid-semester, the young men and women train at the campus camp; campus fields for physical trainings, 1RAMD obstacle course and shooting range for obstacle course exercise and shooting practice, and RMC's parade ground for drills. In this six-week part of LKU at the campus, the cadets are introduced to a basic firearms and training exercises. The battalions are in command of appointed rank holders and final year cadets. The super-seniors are in officer positions such as Platoon leader and Company commanders. At the end of the six-week UKMHK session, awards are given out to the best battalion based on the best performance at each training site.

Moral-ethical development occurs throughout the formal programs. These include formal instruction in the values of the military profession, religious programs, and interaction with staff and faculty role models. The foundation of the ethical code at the university is found in the institution's motto, "Duty, Honor, Integrity." Cadets adhere to the Cadet Honor Code, which states "A cadet will not lie, cheat, steal, or tolerate those who do."

=== Rank ===
Unlike virtually all other bachelor-degree granting institutions in Malaysia (but like the other military academies in Malaysia), the university does not refer to its students as freshmen, sophomores, juniors, or seniors; they are instead called by their year of intake e.g. "2002", "2003", "2004", "20XX".

Colloquially, the freshmen are "tahun asas (basic year)"; sophomores, "tahun satu (year 1)"; juniors, "tahun dua (year 2)"; seniors, "tahun tiga (year 3)"; super-senior, "tahun empat (year 4)". Most cadets consider basic year to be the most difficult because of the rules and restrictions developed to help students transition from civilian to military cadet. However, the third and fourth years are generally considered to be the hardest academically.

Within the university, cadets who reached year three or four can hold positions of increasing responsibility with a cadet rank:

- Cadet: Member of platoon - year 1 to year 4 cadet.
- Cadet Corporal: - year 1 to year 4 cadet.
- Cadet Sergeant: Leader of a platoon - year 3 and year 4 cadet.
- Cadet CSM (KSM): Cadet Company Sergeant Major. Second in charge of a company - year 3 and year 4 cadet.
- Cadet JUO (PRM): Cadet Junior Under Officer. Leading a company/second in charge of a battalion - year 3 and year 4 cadet.
- Cadet SUO (PRK): Cadet Senior Under Officer. Leading a battalion or the cadet brigade - year 4 cadet.

=== Organisation ===
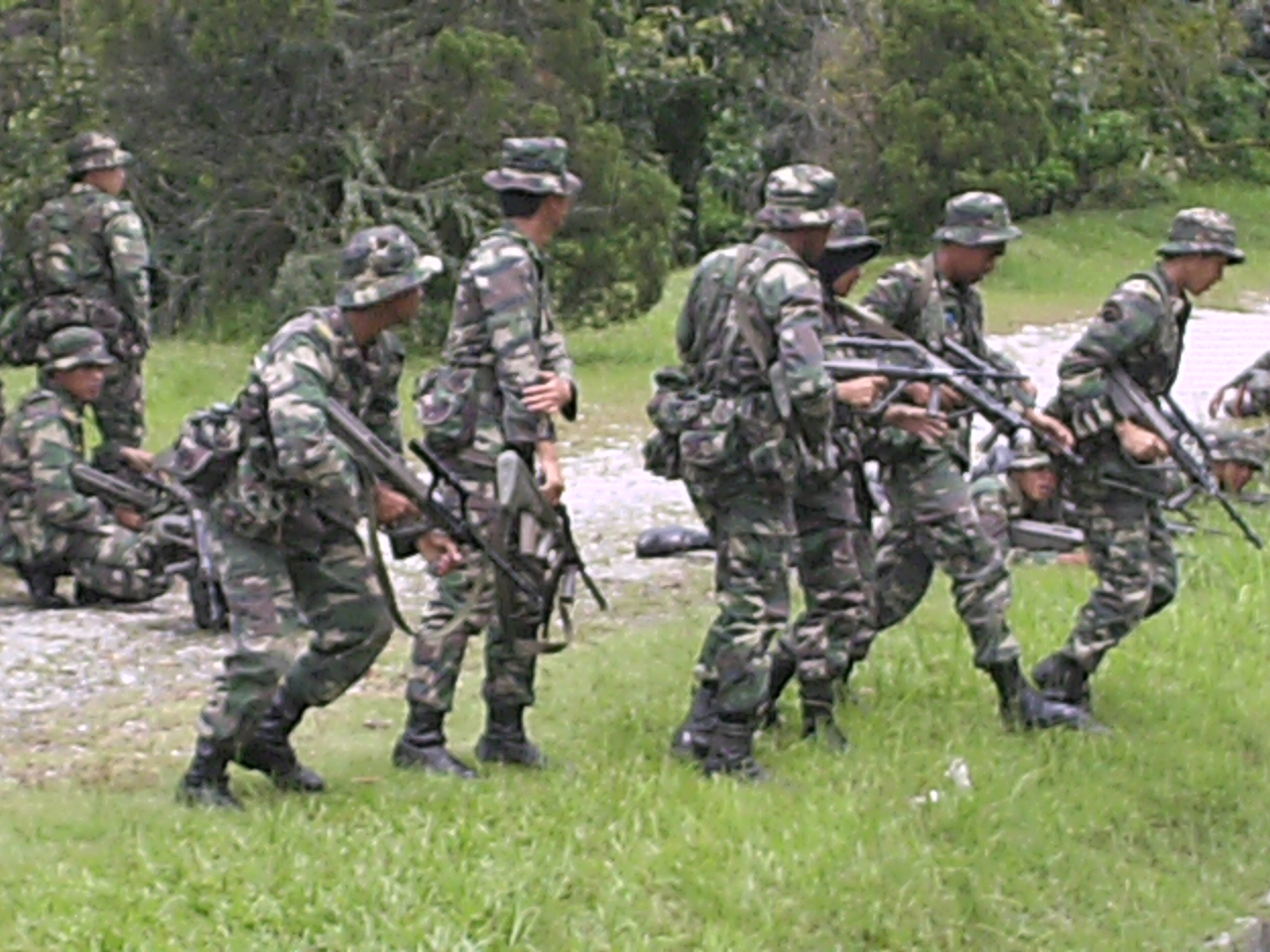
Cadet officers on exercise

In the UPNM student organisation, they are divided by two, Student Representative Council or Majlis Perwakilan Pelajar (consists of military and civilian students), and rank holder and cadet mess secretariat.

The cadets have the following organisation:

(The number of cadets is approximate and varies year to year)

- 1 brigade (1,500 cadets) which consists of:
- 4 battalions
- 9 companies (120 cadets) which each company consist of:
- 3 platoons (40 cadets)

There are 9 companies in the Cadet Brigade and these are as follows:

- Hang Tuah
- Hang Jebat
- Hang Kasturi
- Hang Lekir
- Hang Lekiu
- Tun Perak
- Hang Nadim
- Tun Teja
- A Company Zulu Battalion

Except 'Zulu', each of the companies of the 3 battalions are named after heroes of Malay folklore. Each battalion has their own identity such as insignia, emblem, motto, song and war dance. The Hang Lekiu battalion is the battalion for foundation/basic year cadets, who are living with their own intake for a year before reporting to any one of the battalions as first year cadets. Zulu Battalion is the battalion for final year cadets prior to their commissioning. A cadet will leave their battalion to join Zulu after a batch of previous Zulu have been commissioned, usually in January.

=== Graduation ===
The military graduates of the NDUM receive a bachelor's degree and are commissioned as young officers in the Army or equivalent rank in the navy or air force with an obligation to serve 10 years active service in the military. Eligibility for particular specialties (infantry, artillery, armour, engineers, etc.) is determined by academic performance and personal preference. A cadet is a first class graduate if he or she has earned a 3.70 or above Accumulated Grade Pointer Average (CPA), second class if 3.0-3.69 or third class if 2.99 and below. Each of these new officers receives their new shoulder boards in the presence of the Yang di-Pertuan Agong, the commander in chief of the MAF. The civilian graduates, who also receive degrees, are guaranteed employment in private and public sector firms.

== See also ==
- List of universities in Malaysia
