= Yüksel Koptagel =

Turkish composer and pianist (b. 1931)

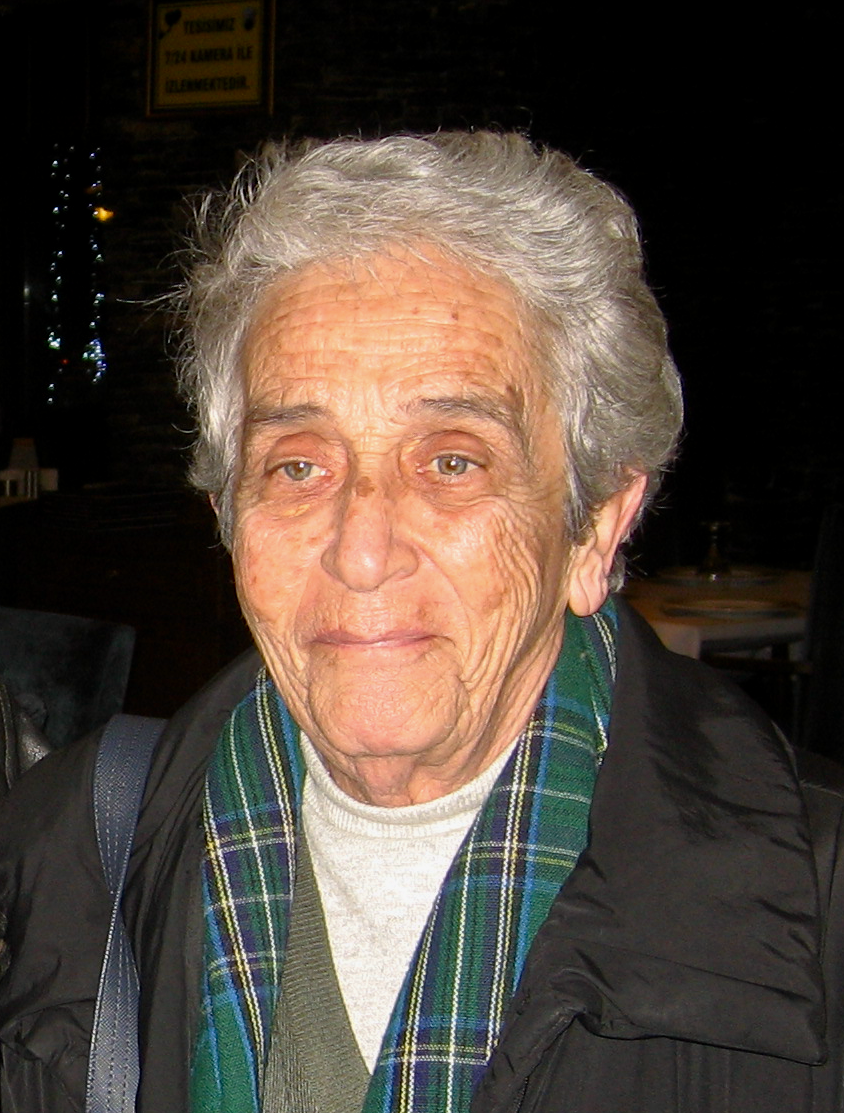
Koptagel in 2018

Yüksel Koptagel (born 27 October 1931) is a Turkish composer and pianist. She was born in Istanbul, Turkey, granddaughter of General Osman Nuri Koptagel, a commander in the Turkish War of Independence. Her maternal great grandfather Abdul Karim Khan Tareen, a physician, had migrated from Multan, British India (now Pakistan) and had settled in Istanbul, adopting the name Abdul Karim Bey. Her father Baha Koptagel was a dentist and her mother Hikmet Koptagel was a teacher.

Yüksel was brought up in a musical environment at home. She started playing the piano with Rana Erksan at five years old. From 1948 to 1955 she studied piano, harmony, counterpoint and fugue under composer and conductor Cemal Reşit Rey. Koptagel gave concerts with Istanbul Municipal Orchestra between the years 1951 to 1954. In 1955 she went to Spain on a grant from the Spanish government. She studied in the Madrid Royal Conservatory with José Cubiles, Joaquin Rodrigo. In 1957 she was accepted to the Conservatoire de Paris where she worked with Tony Aubin, Alexandre Tansman, and Lazare Levy. Invited by the Ministry of Culture in Spain, she attended a number of courses in the city of Santiago de Compostela and worked with Alicia de Larrocha.

After completing her studies, Koptagel took a position with the Istanbul State Symphony Orchestra and worked as a pianist and composer. She is considered to be the owner of the first classical guitar works composed in Turkey.

Koptagel was influenced by Turkish rhythms and motifs in her early works (e.g. Tamzara and Toccata). In some other youthful pieces, she was also inspired by Spanish music (e.g. Minorca Sonata and Epitafo). In general, her compositions are in the style of Western polyphony within a modal context.

== Selected works ==
- Quand nous nous sommes séparés (André Viaud after George Gordon Noel Byron, Lord Byron)
- Pastorale for piano
- Impression de Minorque for piano
- Epitafio de un muchacho muerto en abril for piano
- Toccata for piano
- Fossil Suite (Suite im alten Stil) for piano or guitar
- Tamzara (Türkischer Tanz) for piano or guitar
