= Osman Pasha =

Osman Pasha (also spelled Uthman Pasha or Othman Pasha) may refer to:

- Özdemiroğlu Osman Pasha (1527–1585), Ottoman grand vizier
- Bosniak Osman Pasha (died 1685), Ottoman governor of Egypt, Damascus, and Bosnia
- Topal Osman Pasha (1663–1733), Ottoman grand vizier
- Muhassıl Osman Pasha (died 1750), Ottoman governor of Egypt, Damascus, Tripoli, Sidon, and Jeddah
- Uthman Pasha al-Kurji, Ottoman governor of Damascus (1760–1771) and of Tripoli
- Uthman Pasha al-Wakil, Ottoman commander of the army in Syria (1771–1774)
- Osman Pasha (naval officer) (1792–1860), Ottoman naval officer
- Osman Mazhar Pasha (fl. 1815–61), Ottoman commander and governor

== See also ==
- Osman Nuri Pasha (disambiguation)
- Osman (name)
