= Osman (name) =

Osman refers to two different names:

- Osman or Usman is the Turkish, Kurdish, Persian, and Urdu transliteration of the Arabic masculine given name Uthman.
- Osman is an English surname whose history dates back to the wave of migration that followed the Norman conquest of England in 1066, though it is pronounced with a long "o". Variant spellings include Osment and Osmond. The name comes from the Old English pre-7th-century masculine personal name Osmaer, "oss" meaning god and "maer" meaning fame; hence "god-fame". The name Osmar and Osmer (without surname) appears in the Domesday Book of 1086 for Leicestershire and Devonshire, respectively, but the surname did not appear until the early part of the 13th century. On July 15, 1571, Mary Hosmer, daughter of Richard Hosmer, was christened in Brenchley, Kent, and on September 18, 1580, Jane Hosmer was also christened there. In April 1635, clothier James Hosmer, his wife Ann and two daughters, Marie and Ann, embarked from London on the Elizabeth bound for New England. They were among the earliest recorded name bearers to settle in America. The first recorded spelling of the family name is shown to be that of William Osmere, which was dated 1230, in the Pipe rolls of Devonshire, during the reign of King Henry III.

== Given name ==
=== Osman ===
- Osman I (1258–1326), founder and namesake of the Ottoman Empire
- Osman II (1604–1622), Ottoman sultan
- Osman III (1699–1757), Ottoman sultan
- Osman I of the Maldives, the Sultan of the Maldives in 1377
- Osman II of the Maldives, the Sultan of Maldives from 1420 to 1421
- Osman (1642–1676), Ottoman-born friar of the Dominican Order and alleged prince
- Osman Addo (born 2004), Danish footballer
- Osman Aga of Temesvar (1670–1725), Turkish autobiographer
- Osman or Uthman Beg (1350–1435), leader of the Turkoman tribal federation of Aq Qoyunlu
- Osman Achmatowicz (1899–1988), Polish professor
- Osman Ahmed, Somali ruler and the fifth Sultan of the Gobroon Dynasty
- Osman Ali Atto (1940–2013), Somali warlord
- Osman Jama Ali (born 1941), Somali politician
- Osman Ali Khan, Asaf Jah VII (1886–1967), last Nizam of the kingdom of Hyderabad
- Osman Arpacıoğlu (1947–2021), Turkish footballer
- Osman Arslan (born 1942), Turkish judge
- Osman Atılgan (born 1999), German-Turkish footballer
- Osman Bashiru (born 1989), Ghanaian footballer
- Osman Baydemir (born 1971), Kurdish politician and former Mayor of Diyarbakır
- Osman Birsen (born 1945), Turkish civil servant and former CEO of the Istanbul Stock Exchange
- Osman Bölükbaşı (1913–2002), Turkish politician
- Osman Bukari (born 1998), Ghanaian footballer
- Osman Khalid Butt (born 1986), Pakistani actor, director, and writer
- Osman Çakmak (born 1977), Turkish amputee football manager and former player
- Osman Chávez (born 1984), Honduran footballer
- Osman Cleander Baker (1812–1871), American biblical scholar and bishop
- Osman Coşgül (1928–2001), Turkish long-distance runner
- Osman Can Çötür (born 2001), Turkish footballer
- Osman Đikić (1879–1912), Bosnian poet
- Osman Duraliev (1939–2011), Bulgarian sport wrestler
- Osman Durmuş (1947–2020), Turkish physician and politician
- Osman El-Sayed (1930–2013), 20th-century Egyptian Greco-Roman wrestler
- Osman Eltayeb (1919–2011), Sudanese businessman and Honorary Consul of Sudan in Nigeria
- Osman Ertuğ (born 1949), Cypriot Turkish diplomat
- Osman Fazli (1632–1691), influential Sufi
- Osman Fuad (1895–1973), 39th head of the Imperial House of Osman, the former ruling dynasty of the Ottoman Empire, from 1954 to 1973
- Osman Gradaščević (died 1812), Bosniak nobleman
- Osman Güneş (born 1952), Turkish bureaucrat
- Osman Gürbüz (born 1962), Turkish criminal
- Osman Necmi Gürmen (1927–2015), Turkish novelist
- Osman Hadi (1994–2025), Bangladeshi politician and activist
- Osman Hadžikić (born 1996), Austrian footballer
- Osman Haji (1920–1975), Somali politician
- Osman Hamdi Bey (1842–1910), Ottoman-Turkish statesman, painter, and archaeologist
- Osman Hung (born 1979), Hong Kong actor and singer-songwriter of the Cantopop group EO2
- Osman Kamara (born 1987), Sierra Leonean swimmer
- Osman Karabegović (1911–1996), Yugoslav and Bosnian communist politician
- Osman Kavala (born 1957), Turkish businessman and philanthropist
- Osman Cemal Kaygılı (1890–1945), Turkish writer and journalist
- Osman Kebir, Sudanese governor of the North Darfur province of Sudan
- Osman Yusuf Kenadid (1899–1972), Somali poet and ruler
- Osman Zati Korol (1880–1946), officer of the Ottoman Army and a general of the Turkish Army
- Osman Korutürk (born 1944), Turkish diplomat and politician
- Osman Lins (1924–1978), Brazilian novelist and short story writer
- Osman Faruk Loğoğlu (born 1941), Turkish diplomat
- Osman López (born 1970), Colombian retired footballer
- Osman Mahamuud, 19th-century Somali ruler, king of the Majeerteen Sultanate
- Osman Mahomed, Mauritian politician
- Osman Mema (1939–2023), Albanian footballer
- Osman Menezes Venâncio Júnior (born 1992), Brazilian footballer
- Osman Metalla, Albanian politician
- Osman Mirzayev (1937–1991), Azerbaijani journalist, writer, and publicist
- Osman Medeiros (1896–1929), Brazilian footballer
- Osman Mohamud (born 1960), Somali clan elder from Somaliland
- Osman Nuri (disambiguation), various people
- Osman Nuri Pasha (disambiguation), various people
- Osman Öcalan (1958–2021), Kurdish militant leader
- Osman Orsal, Turkish photo-journalist
- Osman Ahmed Osman (1917–1999), Egyptian engineer, contractor, entrepreneur, and politician
- Osman Osmani, Afghan governor of Ghazni Province, Afghanistan
- Osman Özköylü (born 1971), Turkish retired footballer and coach
- Osman Pazvantoğlu (1758–1807), Bosnian Ottoman soldier, governor and rebel against Ottoman rule
- Osman Saleh Sabbe (1932–1987), Eritrean revolutionary
- Osman Ali Sadagar (1856–1948), Bengali-Assamese politician and educationist
- Osman Saqizli (died 1672), Ottoman dey and pasha of Tripolis
- Osman F. Seden (1924–1998), Turkish film director, screenwriter, and film producer
- Osman Murillo Segura (born 1985), Costa Rican judoka
- Osman Sınav (1956–2025), Turkish film director, producer and screenwriter
- Osman Taka (died 1887), Cham Albanian leader and dancer
- Osman Murat Ülke (born 1970), Turkish conscientious objector
- Osman Waqialla (1925–2007), Sudanese artist and calligrapher
- Osman Omar Wehliye, Somali police commissioner

=== Ousmane ===
- Ousmane Ngom (born 1955), Senegalese politician
- Ousmane Dembélé (born 1997), French Footballer

=== Usman ===
- Usman Afzaal (born 1977), English cricketer
- Usman Ahmed (born 1981), English boxer
- Usman Ali Isani (born 1934), Pakistani bureaucrat
- Usman dan Fodio (1754–1817), African leader also known as Shehu Uthman Dan Fuduye
- Usman Garuba (born 2002), Spanish professional basketball player
- Usman Gondal (born 1987), Pakistani footballer
- Usman Haji Muhammad Ali (1943–1968), Indonesian marine and convicted murderer
- Usman Khan (terrorist) (1991–2019), British terrorist and perpetrator of the 2019 London Bridge stabbing
- Usman Khawaja (born 1986), Australian cricketer
- Usman Sarwar (born 1983), Pakistani cricketer
- Usman Serajuddin (1258–1357), Bengali Islamic scholar
- Usman Simbakoli (born 2001), Central African footballer

=== Uthman ===
- Uthman ibn Affan (580–656), the third Islamic caliph and son-in-law of Muhammad

== Middle name ==
- M Osman Ghani (1912–1989), Bangladeshi academic, Vice-chancellor of the University of Dhaka
- Zulfarhan Osman Zulkarnain (1996–2017), Malaysian murder victim and student

== Surname ==
People with the surname include:

- Arthur Arnold Osman (1893–1972), British nephrologist
- Charles J. Osman (1851–1922), Canadian businessman and politician
- Dan Osman (1963–1998), American extreme sport practitioner
- Dan Osman (Kansas politician), American politician
- Diid Osman (born 1968), English bass guitarist in the Britpop band Sleeper
- Galid Osman (born 1986), Brazilian racing driver
- Harry Osman (1911–1998), English footballer
- Jean-Claude Osman (born 1947), French retired footballer
- Louis Osman (1914–1996), English artist, architect, goldsmith, and medallist
- Marina Osman (born 1965), Belarusian pianist and concertmaster
- Mat Osman (born 1967), English musician
- Matthew Osman (born 1983), English footballer
- Mike Osman (born 1959), English radio presenter, impressionist, and entertainer
- Natalie Osman (born 1989), American professional wrestler and valet
- Oleksandr Osman (born 1996), Ukrainian footballer
- Richard Osman (born 1970), British television presenter, producer, and director
- Russell Osman (born 1959), English former footballer
- Thomas Osman (born 1950), Eritrean Catholic bishop
- William Osman (born 1991), American engineer and YouTuber

=== Surname from Arabic ===
- Abdillahi Abokor Osman (born 1976), Somali politician
- Abdul Osman (born 1987), Ghanaian-born English footballer
- Ahmed Elmi Osman, Somali politician
- Ahmed Osman (author) (born 1934), Egyptian author
- Amin Osman (1898–1946), Egyptian politician
- Arnaut Osman, a hero of Serbian and Albanian epic poetry
- Ashraf Osman (born 2001), Qatari sprinter
- Aziz M. Osman (born 1962), Malaysian actor and director
- Bayezid Osman (1924–2017), 44th Head of the Imperial House of Osman
- Cedi Osman (born 1995), Macedonian-Turkish basketball player
- Farida Osman (born 1995), Egyptian swimmer
- Hadiza Bala Usman (born 1976), Nigerian activist and politician
- Hâfiz Osman (1642–1698), Ottoman calligrapher
- Hafiz Osman (born 1984), Singaporean professional soccer player
- Hasbullah Osman (1957–2020), Malaysian politician
- Kara Yülük Osman (1356–1435), late 14th- and early 15th-century leader of the Turkmen tribal federation Ak Koyunlu
- Leon Osman (born 1981), English footballer of Turkish Cypriot descent
- Levent Osman (born 1977), Australian footballer of Turkish descent
- Mahamane Ousmane (born 1951), the first democratically elected President of Niger
- Magued Osman (born 1951), Egyptian academic
- Mohammad Usman (1912–1948), Indian military office
- Kamaru Usman (born 1987), American Mixed Martial Arstist and UFC fighter
- Ahmed Usman (1951–2021), Nigerian military administrator
- Fakih Usman (1904–1968), Indonesian Islamic leader and politician
- Khalid Usman (born 1986), Pakistani cricketer
- Khwaja Usman (died 1612), Afghan chieftain and opponent to the Mughals
- Maliki Osman (born 1965), Singaporean politician
- M.T. Usman (1932–2009), Nigerian government official
- Mariam Usman (born 1990), Nigerian weightlifter
- Roszaidi Osman (born 1972), Singaporean drug trafficker
- Tanburi Büyük Osman Bey (1816–1885), Ottoman composer and tanbur player
- Topal Osman (1883–1923), Ottoman militia leader
- Topal Osman Pasha (1663–1733), Ottoman grand vizier

== See also ==
- Osman Nuri (disambiguation)
- Osman Nuri Pasha (disambiguation)
- Osman Pasha (disambiguation)
- Osmani
