= Gaziosmanpaşa (disambiguation) =

Gaziosmanpaşa may refer to:

- Gazi Osman Pasha (1832–1900), Ottoman military commander
- Gaziosmanpaşa, a district of Istanbul, Turkey
  - Gaziosmanpaşaspor, a sports club from the district
- Gaziosmanpaşa, Çankaya, a suburb of Ankara, Turkey
- Gaziosmanpaşa University, a public university in Tokat, Turkey
- Gaziosmanpaşa Stadium, a multi-use stadium in Tokat, Turkey

== See also ==
- Osman Nuri Pasha (disambiguation)
