= Action For Humanity =

UK-based international aid organisation

- Founded: 2011
- Founder: Othman Moqbel
- Type: International NGO
- Purpose: Emergency relief, health, education, orphans and child welfare
- Headquarters: Manchester, United Kingdom
- Region served: Syria; Gaza (Palestinian territories); Yemen; Pakistan; Bangladesh; Iraq; Jordan; Lebanon; Turkey; Ukraine
- Key people: CEO: Othman Moqbel; Chair of Trustees: Mounir Hakimi
- Revenue: £35.5 million (2024)
- Disbursements: £32.9 million (2024)
- Employees: 1,700
- Website: www.actionforhumanity.org

Action For Humanity (AFH) is a United Kingdom–based international non-governmental organisation (NGO) delivering humanitarian assistance and recovery programmes in conflict-affected and disaster-hit regions. The organisation was founded in 2011 under the name Syria Relief in response to the humanitarian crisis arising in Syria. It later rebranded as Action For Humanity to reflect the expansion of its international operations beyond Syria.

AFH implements humanitarian programmes across sectors including emergency relief, health, education, food security, water and sanitation, shelter, and livelihoods, working in coordination with international and local partners.

== History ==
Action For Humanity was established in 2011 by humanitarian volunteers and medical professionals responding to the impact of the Syrian conflict. Operating initially as Syria Relief, the organisation focused on delivering emergency medical assistance and life-saving aid to civilians affected by displacement and violence.

As its activities expanded into other humanitarian crises, the organisation adopted the name Action For Humanity to reflect a broader international mandate.

== Activities and programmes ==
Action For Humanity delivers humanitarian assistance across a range of sectors, including emergency food and non-food item distribution, health services, water, sanitation and hygiene (WASH), education, child protection, shelter, and livelihoods support.

Programmes are implemented directly and through partnerships with local civil society organisations in complex and protracted humanitarian emergencies.

== Countries of operation ==
Action For Humanity has implemented humanitarian programmes in multiple countries affected by conflict, displacement, or natural disasters, including Syria, the Palestinian territories (Gaza), Yemen, Pakistan, Iraq, Lebanon, Turkey, Jordan, Bangladesh, and Ukraine.

=== Syria ===
Action For Humanity has expanded its operational footprint in Syria since its founding, delivering humanitarian assistance across multiple regions of the country. Its programmes include emergency relief, health services, education, water and sanitation, and early recovery initiatives for internally displaced populations and conflict-affected communities.

Independent reporting by The Guardian has cited Action For Humanity research documenting repeated displacement among civilians living in camps in north-west Syria.

=== Gaza ===
Action For Humanity has implemented humanitarian assistance in Gaza in response to ongoing hostilities and severe humanitarian access constraints. The organisation has been cited in independent humanitarian reporting warning that aid entering Gaza was insufficient to meet civilian needs, including access to clean water, food, and healthcare.

The Guardian has referenced Action For Humanity data and statements in its coverage of the Gaza conflict, including reporting on repeated displacement and humanitarian conditions faced by civilians.

In April 2024, The Guardian reported that Action For Humanity projected ceasefire messages onto London's Tower Bridge as part of public advocacy related to the conflict.

=== Yemen ===
Action For Humanity maintains an operational presence in Yemen, where it delivers humanitarian assistance addressing food insecurity, health needs, and livelihoods in the context of a prolonged humanitarian crisis.

The organisation has been cited in humanitarian reporting warning of worsening malnutrition and famine risks affecting civilians in Yemen and the wider region.

=== Pakistan ===
Action For Humanity maintains an operational presence in Pakistan, where it has delivered humanitarian responses to natural disasters and supported longer-term community recovery initiatives.

Its work in Pakistan has included emergency assistance following floods and other climate-related disasters affecting vulnerable communities.

== Funding and partnerships ==
Action For Humanity receives funding from private donors, philanthropic foundations, and institutional donors, including United Nations humanitarian funding mechanisms. The organisation works in coordination with UN agencies and international humanitarian partners and collaborates with local organisations to support community-based humanitarian responses.

== Registration and oversight ==
Action For Humanity is registered with the Charity Commission for England and Wales and is subject to UK charity law, regulatory oversight, and reporting requirements.
