= Ousmane Camara =

Ousmane Camara may refer to:

- Ousmane N'Gom Camara (born 1975), Guinean retired football winger
- Ousmane Camara (basketball) (born 1989), French basketball player
- Ousmane Camara (footballer, born 1998), Guinean football winger for Dinamo Tbilisi
- Ousmane Camara (footballer, born 2001), Guinean footballer for Auxerre
- Ousmane Camara (footballer, born 2003), Malian football midfielder for Angers
- Ousmane Camara (footballer, born 2006), Burkinabé football midfielder for Rahimo

== See also ==
- Ousoumane Camara (born 1996), French football midfielder for Auxerre
