= Usman Sarwar =

Personal information
- Full name: Usman Sarwar
- Born: 12 December 1983 (age 42); Lahore, Punjab, Pakistan
- Batting: Right-handed
- Bowling: Right-arm medium-fast

Domestic team information
- Years: Team
- 2008/09: Lahore Eagles

Career statistics
Competition	List A
Matches	1
Runs scored	0
Batting average	–
100s/50s	–/–
Top score	0*
Balls bowled	18
Wickets	–
Bowling average	–
5 wickets in innings	–
10 wickets in match	–
Best bowling	0/78
Catches/stumpings	–/–
- Source: Cricinfo, 10 November 2010

Usman Sarwar (Urdu: عثمان سرور, born 12 December 1983) is a former Pakistani cricketer. Sarwar was a right-handed batsman who bowled right-arm medium-fast. He was born at Lahore, Punjab, Pakistan.

== Only List A match ==
Sarwar played a single List A match for Lahore Eagles against the National Bank of Pakistan in the 2008/09 Royal Bank of Scotland Cup. The match was a disaster for both the Eagles and Sarwar. Bowled out for just 122 in 40.3 overs, Sarwar remained not out on 0 at the end of the Eagles innings. In reply, National Bank of Pakistan scored the 123 runs required to win in just 6.1 overs, with an innings run-rate of 19.94 runs per over. Sarwar himself was singled out for harsh treatment by the batsman: His 3 overs conceded 78 runs, an economy rate of 26. His 3 overs individually conceded 23, 27 and 28 runs. By the end of their reply Salman Butt was unbeaten on 92 from just 25 balls.

== Later claims ==
Prior to the match, Eagles captain Zulqarnain Haider was removed from the captaincy amid allegations that he was under pressure to select certain players for the game; he never played for Lahore again. The captaincy then passed to Ahmed Dar, with Sarwar proceeding to be selected. The National Bank of Pakistan needed to win the match convincingly to improve their net run-rate and qualify for the semi-final of the tournament. The outcome of this match was later investigated, but the Pakistan Cricket Board said nothing untoward had been discovered about the match.

In November 2010, Haider fled to London from the Pakistan vs South Africa series in Dubai, citing threats from bookmakers after he refused to help fix a One Day International in the series. Speaking to Geo TV Haider said: "Yes I have got threats that I should play so and so player, or not play that player". These remarks have put the spotlight on the only List A match Sarwar played and on Sarwar himself, even more so considering the match involved Salman Butt and Mohammad Amir, who are both suspended by the International Cricket Council on suspicion of spot fixing during Pakistan's 2010 tour of England. Wicketkeeper Kamran Akmal is also under investigation for irregularities in a Test match between Australia and Pakistan in 2010, as well as Wahab Riaz, who has himself been questioned by New Scotland Yard about spot-fixing.
