= Larmin Ousman =

Liberian footballer

Personal information
- Date of birth: June 15, 1981 (age 45)
- Place of birth: Monrovia, Liberia
- Height: 1.78 m (5 ft 10 in)
- Position: Defender

Senior career*
Years	Team	Apps	(Gls)
?–2002	NPA Anchors		
2002–2004	Floda BoIF		
2005–2009	Ljungskile SK	30	(2)

International career
2002	Liberia	1	(0)
- * Club domestic league appearances and goals as of 02:00, 20 March 2007 (UTC)

Larmin Ousman (born June 15, 1981) is a Liberian former footballer who played for Ljungskile SK. He was a member of the Liberia national football team.
