= Murder of Zulfarhan Osman Zulkarnain =

2017 murder of a cadet officer in Malaysia

Zulfarhan Osman Zulkarnain
- Born: Zulfarhan Osman bin Zulkarnain; 29 November 1996; Johor Bahru, Johor, Malaysia
- Died: 1 June 2017 (aged 20); Serdang Hospital, Sepang District, Selangor, Malaysia
- Cause of death: Multiple burn wounds (caused by ironing machine attacks)
- Resting place: Kebun Teh Muslim cemetery (Johor Bahru)
- Other name: Along
- Education: National Defence University of Malaysia (incomplete due to his death)
- Occupations: Student; Navy cadet officer
- Parents: Zulkarnian Idros (father); Hawa Osman (mother)

Between 21 and 22 May 2017, 20-year-old Zulfarhan Osman Zulkarnain (29 November 1996 – 1 June 2017), a military cadet officer of National Defence University of Malaysia, was relentlessly tortured and scalded with a steam iron at the university's hostel by his fellow students over a stolen laptop, and died from multiple injuries at Serdang Hospital on 1 June 2017. A total of 18 students, all male, were arrested and out of these 18 suspects, six of them were charged with murder and assault while the remaining 12 were charged with assaulting and hurting Zulfarhan. A 19th suspect was originally charged with causing hurt to the victim but was acquitted without having his defence being called.

After a long-drawn trial process from 29 January 2018 to 2 November 2021, the Kuala Lumpur High Court found the six main perpetrators guilty of manslaughter instead of murder, and sentenced them to 18 years' imprisonment each, while the remaining 12 were sentenced to three years in jail each for causing hurt to Zulfarhan. However, upon the prosecution's appeal on 23 July 2024, the Court of Appeal found the six main offenders guilty of murder and sentenced them to death, after finding that the murder itself was among the "rarest of the rare" cases and the six had exhibited a blatant disregard for human life, and hence the death penalty was the only appropriate sentence for the six. The respective three-year jail terms of the 12 other accomplices were raised to four years for each of them.

The six condemned who were guilty of murder filed appeals to the Federal Court of Malaysia, and on 28 February 2025, the Federal Court overturned the death sentence and instead restored the six men's manslaughter conviction and 18-year prison terms.

== Murder investigation ==
On 1 June 2017, after he was hospitalized for burn wounds and swelling, 20-year-old Zulfarhan Osman Zulkarnain, the eldest of four children (two sons and two daughters) in his family, died at Serdang Hospital. At the time of his death, Zulfarhan was a third-year student and navy cadet officer of National Defence University of Malaysia in Sungai Besi, Kuala Lumpur.

When the nature of Zulfarhan's injuries were relayed to the authorities, the police classified his death as murder, and brought in a total of 36 students from both Zulfarhan's school and Universiti Tenaga Nasional (UNITEN) for questioning. Defence Minister Datuk Seri Hishammuddin Tun Hussein, who got wind of the death of Zulfarhan, called for the Malaysian Armed Forces and the university to conduct an investigation into the death of Zulfarhan. After the completion of an autopsy, Zulfarhan was laid to rest at Kebun Teh Muslim cemetery in Johor Bahru, which was Zulfarhan's hometown. Sources revealed that prior to the birth of Zulfarhan, his mother Hawa Osman had two miscarriages, and she did not approve of her eldest son's choice to go to UPNM after completing his diploma at Universiti Tun Hussein Onn Malaysia (Zulfarhan had failed to enter the Royal Military College during secondary school before this); her disapproval was due to her late brother's experience of having difficulty getting leave throughout his military career, but she relented eventually.

First-stage investigations revealed that Zulfarhan was a victim of bullying in his school, and he had been tortured for a period of two days straight from 21 May to 22 May 2017 by a group of students at the university's dormitory quarters. It was alleged that a laptop of one of Zulfarhan's abusers went missing and hence they interrogated Zulfarhan and also caused harm to him by scalding him with a steam iron, trying to force him to admit to the whereabouts of the missing laptop. Although it was speculated that 20 to 30 students were involved in the brutal assault that ended with Zulfarhan's murder, 19 of them, aged between 20 and 21, were confirmed to have been allegedly responsible for the abuse-turned-murder of Zulfarhan.

On 14 June 2017, six of the 19 arrested students were charged with murder. Five of them – Muhammad Akmal Zuhairi Azmal, Muhammad Azamuddin Mad Sofi, Muhammad Najib Mohd Razi, Muhammad Afif Najmudin Azahat and Mohamad Shobirin Sabri – were charged with directly murdering Zulfarhan under Section 302 of the Malaysian Penal Code, which warranted the mandatory death penalty if found guilty, while the sixth, Abdoul Hakeem Mohd Ali, was charged with abetment of murder under Section 109 of the same law (read together with Section 302), which prescribed the same penalty as murder under this section if convicted as charged. Another 13 students, whose identities were not revealed, were charged with voluntarily causing hurt to Zulfarhan under Section 330 of the Penal Code (which carried the maximum jail term of seven years and a fine), for the purpose of forcing a confession out of the victim. All the 19 suspects pleaded not guilty to the charges. Bail was not granted to the six accused of murder due to it being a capital offence.

On 15 September 2017, the six students who were charged with the murder of Zulfarhan were ordered to stand trial at the Kuala Lumpur High Court, where their cases were transferred to. On 27 October 2017, the prosecution appealed that the case of all the remaining 13 suspects should be transferred to the High Court and heard in the same trial together with the six charged for the murder of Zulfarhan. This request was granted by the High Court on 13 November 2017, and one month later, on 8 December 2017, the trial for all the 19 alleged offenders was scheduled to begin on 29 January 2018 and carried out for an estimated 14-day period.

== Participants ==
Murder (Section 302 of the Penal Code)

1. Muhammad Akmal Zuhairi Azmal, 21 years old
2. Muhammad Azamuddin Mad Sofi (also spelt Muhammad Azamuddin Mod Sofi), 21 years old
3. Muhammad Najib Mohd Razi, 21 years old
4. Muhammad Afif Najmudin Azahat, 21 years old
5. Mohamad Shobirin Sabri, 21 years old

Abetment of murder (Section 109, read with Section 302 of the Penal Code)

1. Abdoul Hakeem Mohd Ali, 21 years old

Voluntarily causing hurt to extort confession or to compel restoration of property (Section 330, read with Section 34 of the Penal Code)

1. Mohd Hafiz Fauzan Ismail, 21 years old
2. Mohamad Lukhmanul Hakim Mohd Zain, 21 years old
3. Ahmad Shafwan Berdal, 21 years old
4. Muhammad Amirul Asraff Mala, 21 years old
5. Luqman Hakim Shamsuri Agus, 21 years old
6. Muhammad Sufi Mohd Mustapha, 21 years old
7. Noriznan Izzairi Noor Azhar, 21 years old
8. Muhamad Ashraf Abdullah, 21 years old
9. Muhammad Danial Firdaus Azmir, 21 years old
10. Muhammad Hasif Ismail, 21 years old
11. Muhammad Adib Iman Fuad Ady Sani, 21 years old
12. Mohamad Syazwan Musa, 21 years old
13. Muhammad Akmal Akif Alias, 21 years old

== Murder trial ==
=== Prosecution's case ===
On 29 January 2018, the 19 students stood trial at the Kuala Lumpur High Court for the torture and murder of Zulfarhan. The trial was presided over by Justice Datuk Azman Abdullah, while the prosecution was led by Othman Abdullah and Julia Ibrahim.

The prosecution's case was that prior to the fatal torture of Zulfarhan, the laptop belonging to Muhammad Akmal Zuhairi Azmal, one of the six men accused of murder, had gone missing and he suspected that Zulfarhan had stolen it. Although Zulfarhan denied that he stole it, which was the truth, Muhammad Akmal did not believe him and persisted in his suspicion. Evidence was adduced during the trial that Muhammad Akmal had sought help from a bomoh, who was the father of one of the 12 accused persons charged with injuring Zulfarhan, and the bomoh deduced from his prayers and visions that the culprit who stole the laptop was Zulfarhan, which turned out to be inaccurate as he was truly innocent. These allegations fueled the bullying against Zulfarhan, and eventually culminated into the series of physical torture that ended Zulfarhan's life.

On 21 May 2017, together with 12 of the 13 defendants charged with causing hurt, five of the main accused – Muhammad Akmal Zuhairi Azmal, Muhammad Azamuddin Mad Sofi, Muhammad Najib Mohd Razi, Muhammad Afif Najmudin Azahat and Abdoul Hakeem Mohd Ali – held Zulfarhan in confinement at the dormitory quarters of the university. They relentlessly assaulted him, wanting to force Zulfarhan to confess that he had stolen the laptop, but Zulfarhan once again denied stealing the laptop. On 22 May 2017, the next day, five of the main accused – Muhammad Akmal Zuhairi Azmal, Muhammad Azamuddin Mad Sofi, Muhammad Najib Mohd Razi, Muhammad Afif Najmudin Azahat and Abdoul Hakeem Mohd Ali – and a sixth person Mohamad Shobirin Sabri once again restrained Zulfarhan at the dormitory quarters of the university. This time round, things took the turn for the worse as the six men took out a steam iron to scald Zulfarhan on his body multiple times, including his private parts, and Zulfarhan, in a state of extreme pain, continued to deny stealing the laptop. This persisted for several hours before the six defendants finally stopped, leaving Zulfarhan with multiple burn wounds. Throughout the next few days, Zulfarhan did not report for class or training due to him being in a poor condition as a result of the burns.

Dr Azfar Hussin, a clinic doctor, testified in court that on 27 May 2017, five days after the scalding incidents, Zulfarhan was accompanied by four friends to consult him, and his friends told Dr Azfar that Zulfarhan injured himself from an explosion during army training at an army camp. Without suspecting anything amiss, Dr Azfar became alarmed by the severity of the burn wounds after examining and stated that Zulfarhan needed medical treatment at a hospital, and Zulfarhan turned it down, stating that he would manage with dressing. Dr Azfar still chose to write a referral letter to a hospital, and continued to advise Zulfarhan's friends to bring him to the hospital. The doctor identified four of the murder accused – Muhammad Akmal, Muhammad Azamuddin, Muhammad Afif and Abdoul Hakeem – as the friends who brought Zulfarhan to the clinic. However, despite the doctor's advice, the four did not comply and never took Zulfarhan to hospital. Four days later, on 31 May 2017, Zulfarhan came to the clinic a second time, and he appeared weaker, fatigued and dehydrated. Dr Azfar questioned Zulfarhan why did he not go straight to hospital, and he replied that his condition was better and Zulfarhan wanted him to clean and apply bandages on the wounds on his thigh and backside, before he could go to hospital later. Dr Azfar, who still told Zulfarhan to go to hospital immediately, noted that Zulfarhan was accompanied by two friends, whom he identified as Muhammad Akmal and Muhammad Azamuddin, during his second consultation. A day after this, Zulfarhan died in Serdang Hospital shortly after one of the accused persons called the ambulance upon discovering that he became stiff and unresponsive.

Dr Salmah Arshad, a forensic pathologist who examined Zulfarhan's body, stated that there were a total of 90 burn marks on Zulfarhan's body, and 29 of these wounds were third-degree burn injuries, which were scientifically the most severe level of burns, with visible wet muscle tissue and bleeding, and they were sufficient in the ordinary course of nature to cause death. Dr Salmah stated that even with medical intervention at that stage, the injuries were too serious and lethal and hence would inevitably lead to the death of the deceased. She also added that the fatal burn wounds were the direct cause of the swelling of the heart and kidney failure. However, the defence's forensic expert Dr Rohayu Shahar Adnan disputed the findings of Dr Salmah, stating that her microscopic examination did not show that the continuity of major burns suffered by the victim had solely caused Zulfarhan's death. With regards to the number of burn wounds found on Zulfarhan's corpse, Dr Rohayu commented that there was a possibility that more than 90 injuries were inflicted, or that the non-burn injuries had mixed up with the burn wounds, which may indicate there were less than 90 burn wounds in actuality.

S. Hari Krishna Rao, a 22-year-old medical student at UPNM, testified that when the laptop theft was known to him, he asked Zulfarhan if he had ever entered Muhammad Akmal's room, and Zulfarhan denied ever setting foot into Muhammad Akmal's room or stealing his laptop. 23-year-old Nurul Syuhada Md Jamean, Zulfarhan's then girlfriend and final-year student in Human Resources, testified that her late boyfriend had called her in pain, stating that he was being assaulted by his friends over a stolen laptop and he denied taking the laptop. Mohd Syafiq Abdullah, Zulfarhan's 22-year-old roommate in the dormitory, was able to identify in court who were the defendants involved in the assault and scalding of Zulfarhan, as he witnessed these series of torture happening on Zulfarhan but he could not clearly recall where are the areas on Zulfarhan's body that got scalded. Muhammad Ilham Zamree, a 22-year-old friend of Zulfarhan since age 16, also testified that he saw Muhammad Najib, one of the six murder accused, carrying a steam iron on the day in question, and he only heard of but did not directly witness the scalding incident. 22-year-old Muhammad Aiman Aufa Asmadi Affendi, a friend of Zulfarhan, stated that he had sent two poison-pen letters to inform the university's top management about the abuse inflicted on Zulfarhan but he did not further intervene as he was fearful of meeting a similar predicament as Zulfarhan, and he regretted not doing so given that Zulfarhan died in the end despite his attempt to help him. Third-year Human Resource Management student Ahmad Senabil Mohamad, then 22 years old, also testified in court that he witnessed the assault and scalding of Zulfarhan and recounted to the court about what he saw.

=== Defence's case ===
On 31 July 2019, 18 of the accused were ordered to enter their defence, after the trial court ruled that a prima facie case had been successfully established against the 18 defendants, but at the same time, the 19th and final accused, Muhammad Akmal Akif Alias, was acquitted of all charges and released after the High Court found that on the totality of the evidence, there was no case for him to answer. Muhammad Akmal Akif Alias was reportedly relieved at the acquittal and wept openly in court, and he told the reporters outside the courtroom that he wanted to continue his studies.

The first accused, Muhammad Akmal Zuhairi Azmal, admitted that he placed a hot iron on the victim's sole and knee, and saw the victim screaming in pain but never fought back. Muhammad Akmal denied that he wanted to cause Zulfarhan's death, and he denied that he deliberately chose to not report the matter to the university staff out of fear of being disciplined for his actions. He disagreed with the prosecution about the number of injuries or that he and the remaining five murder accused took turns to scald Zulfarhan. The second accused, Muhammad Azamuddin Mad Sofi, also denied on the stand that he used the iron on Zulfarhan's private parts or his shoulders and thigh 18 times, although he admitted to waving it the victim's shoulders but claimed that he never expected any severe harm arising from this, and Muhammad Azamuddin, who publicly apologized to Zulfarhan's parents in court, also denied the prosecution's contention that he and Muhammad Akmal tied up Zulfarhan with a taekwondo belt. The third accused, Muhammad Najib Mohd Razi, took the stand and stated he was studying at another student's room when Abdoul Hakeem suddenly asked him to come over and "do it once", and he was being passed a steam iron after following Abdoul Hakeem. Muhammad Najib stated he heard Zulfarhan screaming when he held the iron, which brought shock to him before he let go of the iron and go back to bed.

The fourth accused, Muhammad Afif Najmudin Azahat, admitted that when they restrained Zulfarhan, he was only wearing a boxer shorts, and Muhammad Afif admitted that he placed the steam iron twice onto Zulfarhan's thighs, and he heard the victim shouting, "Don't!" Muhammad Afif claimed he scalded Zulfarhan for just one second before he stopped and left the room, and he stated that he shared a good relationship with the victim and never wanted to cause any serious injury or death. Muhammad Afif stated he remembered the iron was emitting steam but denied knowing the extent of the iron's temperature. The fifth accused, Mohamad Shobirin Sabri, stated that he only arrived at the dormitory room to check on Zulfarhan, after hearing that some people were restraining and interrogating him about the stolen laptop, and just as he was about to depart for his prayers, someone passed him the iron and told him to put the iron on Zulfarhan. Mohamad Shobirin admitted that he spontaneously put the steam iron on Zulfarhan's leg, and he heard Zulfarhan crying in pain, pleading with his captors to not hurt him. Mohamad Shobirin readily admitted that he had done wrong by placing the iron on Zulfarhan despite knowing how hot it was. Abdoul Hakeem Mohd Ali, the sixth accused charged with abetting the first five to commit murder, denied giving the orders to the first five accused to torture or scald Zulfarhan when he entered his defence against the abetment charge.

The remaining 12 accused persons tried for causing hurt also put up their defences. Some defendants, if not all of them, similarly denied participating in the assault of Zulfarhan before his death for different reasons. The defence completed its case on 8 April 2021 after calling over 20 witnesses. Due to the infectious COVID-19 pandemic in Malaysia, and that four of the defendants were tested positive while detained at Alor Setar Prison in Kedah, the trial was vacated at one point to allow the four to recover before they could continue making their defence.

Closing submissions were made by both sides on 29 September 2021, and the verdict was scheduled to be meted out on 2 November 2021.

=== Verdict ===
On 2 November 2021, Justice Datuk Azman Abdullah delivered his verdict. In his judgement, Justice Azman found that there was an intention by all the six main accused to severely assault Zulfarhan, and the prosecution had proven successfully that these six defendants had harboured this intention, with one of them abetting and instructing the five others to torture Zulfarhan. However, the judge did not accept that the six accused should be convicted of murder, as he found that the prosecution failed to prove that there was an intention to cause death despite having proven their intent to injure Zulfarhan.

Therefore, the six defendants accused of murder were found guilty of a lesser charge of culpable homicide not amounting to murder, or manslaughter under Section 304(a) of the Penal Code. The law provides for a potential sentence of up to 30 years in jail and a possible fine on a charge of manslaughter. The judge ordered all six of these defendants to be jailed for 18 years each, with their sentences backdated to the dates of their arrests on 1 June 2017. Additionally, the 12 other students accused of causing hurt to Zulfarhan were convicted as charged and each of them were sentenced to three years' imprisonment, although they remain out on bail while pending their appeal against sentence. Five of the six found guilty of manslaughter were similarly convicted and given three-year jail terms for the other charge of causing hurt to Zulfarhan. Before sentencing, Justice Azman described the acts of assaulting and causing Zulfarhan's death were nothing less than the actions of hardcore criminals despite the young age of the six convicted of killing Zulfarhan, and he expressed sadness for the six killers' family members, adding that they would have become officers in the armed forces if they had not done what they did, and they would not have pressed Zulfarhan with a hot iron if they had any shred of love and friendship for him, citing that any normal person would have felt how painful was it to get a single touch from an iron.

Zulfarhan's mother Hawa Osman was allowed to give a victim impact statement on the date of the High Court sentencing. In the courtroom itself, Hawa called for justice to be served on her eldest son's killers. She stated that the family counted on Zulfarhan to help take care of the family, after her husband retired and drove a taxi for a living, and she herself worked at a secondary school canteen, and also to help his younger siblings to go to university, and she counted on Zulfarhan to take care of his parents in their twilight years. Hawa said she wanted an appropriate punishment equal to the loss of her child who was precious to her, and she wanted the courts to mete out a punishment to serve as a signal to society at large to prevent similar tragedies from befalling on other families out there, and expressed her hope that other parents will never feel the pain of losing a child like she and her husband did. It was further revealed in court that the death of Zulfarhan took a heavy toll on his parents' healths, and for Hawa, developed severe cataract problems in 2018 due to constant crying, and she had high blood pressure. Hawa also became fearful of letting her other children leave the family home to live on their own or even pursue their studies away from her, out of the fear that they might meet the same fate as their eldest brother, and Hawa also did not want her other children to join any uniformed services, viewing them as the direct cause of the permanent loss of her beloved son. Zulfarhan's father lamented to the press that his son was killed over the baseless claims of a bomoh, and heavily blamed the bomoh for being the direct cause of his son's death, and he forgave the defendants for his son's death despite feeling disappointed towards the verdict, and he would leave it to the higher courts to decide on the outcome of his son's case.

The prosecution confirmed that they would appeal against the High Court's decision, mainly the acquittals of the six main accused for murder and the sentences of the 12 other defendants accused of injuring Zulfarhan. The notice of appeal was pending for more than two years before it was announced in April 2024 that the appeal was fixed for hearing on 14 May of that same year.

== Prosecution's appeal ==
=== Submissions ===
On 14 May 2024, two years and seven months after the High Court made its ruling, the Court of Appeal heard the prosecution's appeal against the six main offenders' acquittal for murder, as well as the sentences of the 12 other offenders for causing hurt. Additionally, the 18 convicts of the Zulfarhan murder case also appealed against their sentences. However, before the hearing convened, the six men jailed for manslaughter dropped their appeals against their convictions for causing hurt.

Arguing before the appellate court's three-judge panel, the prosecution requested for the six principal offenders to be convicted of murder as originally charged, and also sought the death penalty for all six of them. Deputy Public Prosecutor (DPP) K. Mangai submitted that based on the opinion of forensic pathologist Dr Salmah Arshad, out of the 90 burn marks on Zulfarhan's body, 29 were third-degree burn injuries, which were scientifically the most severe level of burns, with visible wet muscle tissue and bleeding, such that these would result in death even with medical intervention. DPP Mangai also submitted that it was not disputed that the six main offenders – Muhammad Akmal, Muhammad Azamuddin, Muhammad Najib, Muhammad Afif, Mohamad Shobirin and Abdoul Hakeem – were directly involved in the scalding of Zulfarhan, with Abdoul Hakeem egging the five on while they each took turns using the steam iron to viciously and intentionally torture Zulfarhan. The prosecution also brought the court's attention to the trauma and heartbreak which the victim's family underwent due to the death of Zulfarhan, and echoed the impassioned plea by Zulfarhan's mother for a just punishment as equal as the magnitude of the six killers' actions, and thus asked that the verdict of manslaughter and 18-year term of imprisonment for the six to be overturned in favour of the murder charge and death penalty.

Touching on the cases of causing hurt in the same court session, DPP Solehah Noratikah Ismail argued that the jail terms of three years for these 12 offenders should be increased to the maximum sentence of seven years in prison, which should serve as a deterrent and warning to not only the convicts but to their friends, so as to send the message that bullying would not be tolerated in schools. She also cited the testimony of two prosecution witnesses, who did not try to intervene and stop the bullying out of fear that they might get implicated and meet the same fate as Zulfarhan.

On the other hand, the defence counsels representing the 18 men sought to overturn the High Court's verdict. In the case of the six killers, Muhammad Najib's lawyer Datuk Hisyam Teh Poh Teik submitted that the trial judge failed to take into consideration of the testimony of Muhammad Alif Farhan Aerosni, a defence witness and fellow student of Muhammad Najib who was with him at the time of the incident. Mohamad Shobirin's lawyer Datuk Hazman Ahmad sought to reduce his client's sentence for it was manifestly excessive and using a hot iron could hardly be categorized as a criminal act, and even if it was indeed done, it was done without intent, noting that Mohamad Shobirin confessed to using the iron on Zulfarhan but only did it once. Although he argued against the manslaughter conviction, Amer Hamzah Arshad, who represented both Muhammad Akmal and Muhammad Azamuddin, asked that both his clients should be given a second chance and asked that their jail terms be reduced to 12 years each if the appellate court agreed with the conviction of manslaughter, since they both helped bring Zulfarhan to the clinic for treatment despite their heinous actions.

As for Abdoul Hakeem's lawyer Datuk Mohd Zamri Mohd Idrus, he sought to cast blame on the victim, pointing out that Zulfarhan had several windows of opportunity to seek medical help and no one had prevented him from doing so, yet he himself did not seek it earlier and it caused him to die. Mohd Zamri also argued that being in a university dormitory room and not a remote jungle, Zulfarhan did not make even a phone call for his parents and accused the investigating officer for solely pinning the blame on the defendants, which he argued was not a symbol of justice and an act of unfairness where many factors contributed to the victim's death. However, his arguments attracted criticism from the judges and prosecution alike, as one of the judges questioned him for blaming the victim, while the prosecution rebutted that there was evidence that the appellants did not want to take Zulfarhan to the hospital because they did not want to face any retribution from the authorities, and the victim himself was confined in another room without any evidence of him gaining access to a phone. Mangai also shot down Mohd Zamri's arguments by adducing the evidence of Zulfarhan's absence from class and training due to the severity of his injuries and his poor physical condition, and even submitted the testimony of a e-hailing driver who brought Zulfarhan to the clinic and had to clean the backseat of his car, because of the stains of blood left on the seat previously occupied by the victim, questioning the six killers' willful blindness to his condition that was observed by the driver.

In the case of the 12 other co-accused, defence lawyer A G Kalidas (who represented all 12 of them) argued that the convictions of causing hurt should not stand for his clients, it was the prosecution who failed to prove the common intention between the appellants, and refuted that they were co-conspirators in the assault. Kalidas stated that it was hard to prove that all the appellants had taken part in attacking Zulfarhan, given that there were nearly 50 students residing in the dormitory when the incident occurred, and he asked the court to consider and determine whether they were all acting together as 32 people were arrested and remanded, with some of them turning prosecution witnesses against the 18 defendants charged in this case. He also stated that intimidation and bullying should not be permitted, but not following the crowd meant that they would be shunned, and might lead to weakening of friendships. However, the judges were critical of his arguments, and Justice Datuk Hadhariah Syed Ismail, who led the panel of three judges, stated that there was a motive for the appellants in this case to attack Zulfarhan due to accusations of him stealing Muhammad Akmal's laptop, and it was impossible for the lawyer to argue any absence of motive behind the attack, and there was no evidence to show that Zulfarhan had stolen the laptop and its existence in question was not proven either since the laptop and the purchase receipt were not admitted during trial.

The appellate court's verdict was scheduled to be given on 23 July 2024, after it completed a three-day hearing of all the cross-appeals from the prosecution and convicts alike.

=== Ruling by the Court of Appeal ===
On 23 July 2024, the Court of Appeal delivered its verdict. The court's three-member bench – consisting of Justice Hadhariah Syed Ismail, Justice Mohamed Zaini Mazlan and Justice Datuk Azmi Ariffin – allowed the prosecution's appeal, overturning the manslaughter conviction of the six main offenders and set aside their 18-year jail terms and hence found them guilty of the original charge of murder.

Explaining why they re-instated the original charges of murder (and abetment of murder in Abdoul Hakeem's case), Justice Hadhariah, who pronounced the verdict in court, stated that the trial judge made an error in determining that it was unclear which specific injury on Zulfarhan's body led to his death. Justice Hadhariah added that the trial judge had also erred in stating that the court needed to identify the most serious injury to determine whether the six accused intended to cause death, given that for a Section 300(c) murder charge, which defined murder as an act of intentionally causing fatal injuries to a person, the prosecution's burden of proof in this case was whether the first six defendants had the intention to cause the injuries, which was more of a priority than the need to prove any intention to cause the injuries that resulted in Zulfarhan's death.

The three judges noted that five of the main perpetrators had intentionally used the iron on Zulfarhan, such that they had inflicted severe burn wounds that were sufficient in the ordinary course of nature to cause death, and there was a common intention between all five of them – Muhammad Akmal, Muhammad Azamuddin, Muhammad Najib, Muhammad Afif and Mohamad Shobirin – to commit the acts of scalding that led to the death of Zulfarhan. Abdoul Hakeem was deemed to be playing a complicit role in the murder since he instructed the five to torture Zulfarhan even though he never laid a hand on the victim throughout the scalding incidents. On the grounds that the original trial judge erred in convicting the six murder accused of manslaughter, the Court of Appeal overruled the trial court's decision, and convicted all the six main accused of murder.

In relation to the potential sentences of the six main offenders, Justice Hadhariah held that the murder of Zulfarhan was among the "rarest of the rare" cases of murder where it had greatly shocked both the judicial conscience and the society's collective conscience, and Zaulfarhan's death was caused by inhumane and heinous acts that equated to extreme and rare cruelty, so much so that any parent whose child ended up in the same situation as Zulfarhan would have felt the same sadness and pain deeply felt by Zulfarhan's parents. Justice Hadhariah quoted in her own words:

The court will not tolerate such incidents. What parent can bear the suffering of seeing their beloved child tortured in such a way that leads to their death in such a horrifying state?

Justice Hadhariah stated that it was necessary to uphold the principles of deterrence and retribution, and when touching on the aggravating factors, Justice Hadhariah stated that the victim Zulfarhan was truly innocent of the alleged theft of the laptop, and the first five defendants had tied up Zulfarhan and used an iron to scald him multiple times all over his body (including his private parts), and the sixth accused Abdoul Hakeem had directed the five men to torture and interrogate Zulfarhan over the missing laptop, and these acts were extremely sadistic and callous. Despite seeing the victim writhing in pain, the six accused mercilessly persisted in torturing him and caused over 90 burn injuries on Zulfarhan's body, which demonstrated their blatant disregard for human life and compassion. The judge also noted that the six killers had deliberately concealed the victim to cover up their violent acts and also did not take the victim to hospital. Justice Hadhariah admonished the six men for continuing to blame the victim and stated that in truth, all of this, including the torture and eventual death of Zulfarhan, originated from their evil deeds.

Having taken all the above factors into account, Justice Hadhariah did not neglect to mention that after the judicial revision of the law in 2023, the offence of murder carried the death penalty or a jail term of 30 to 40 years with not less than 12 strokes of the cane under Section 302 of the Malaysian Penal Code. The judge stated that the unanimous opinion of the bench was that, given the horrific and malicious nature of the murder, all the six accused – Muhammad Akmal, Muhammad Azamuddin, Muhammad Najib, Muhammad Afif, Mohamad Shobirin and Abdoul Hakeem – should be sentenced to the maximum punishment of death by hanging, which was the only appropriate sentence called for in this case.

Apart from sentencing the first six accused to death for murder, the same three-judge panel also enhanced the three-year sentences of the 12 other defendants to four years of imprisonment each, and hereby concluded the appeal hearing in a 93-page judgement.

Reportedly, Zulfarhan's parents and other family members were glad and heartened at the Court of Appeal judgement, and Zulfarhan's 60-year-old father stated that justice was served with all the six principal offenders sentenced to death for his eldest son's murder, although he did not lay his heart to rest since the six accused might further appeal to the Federal Court of Malaysia, the highest court of the nation. Zulfarhan's 61-year-old mother stated that while she hoped for the bomoh, the same person who first sparked the chain of events leading to the death of her eldest son, to suffer the same pain and plight as her late eldest son, but she stated she was willing to forgive the bomoh if he showed remorse and apologized to their family for having wrongly predicted Zulfarhan as the laptop thief.

Three days after the appellate court's ruling, Zulfarhan's father revealed in a radio interview that he never received an apology from any of the 18 defendants involved in his son's murder, although he did receive a personal apology from Muhammad Akmal Akif Alias, the 19th accused of the trial who was acquitted of assaulting his son without entering his defence. Zulfarhan's father also stated that while he had encountered the parents of the perpetrators several times in court, neither of them had come forward to apologize. Aside from this, Zulfarhan's father expressed his gratitude to the student who anonymously wrote the letter to the school to expose the bullying, acknowledging the student's attempt to help Zulfarhan and stating his wish to meet the student face to face. Zulfarhan's father also revealed that he actually filed a lawsuit against the administration of his son's university but due to "bureaucratic delays from certain parties", the legal motion had expired after reaching its three-year deadline.

== Federal Court appeal ==
On the same day of the ruling by the Court of Appeal in July 2024, the lawyers representing the six murder convicts confirmed on the same day that they would appeal against the Court of Appeal's ruling.

On 18 February 2025, the first appeal hearing convened at the Federal Court. The defence counsel of the six condemned perpetrators argued that their respective clients' convictions for murder and death sentences should be overturned in favour of an acquittal and claimed that the evidence failed to satisfy the threshold of convicting the defendants of murder and there were alleged errors in the judgement.

On 28 February 2025, the Federal Court overturned the murder convictions and death sentences of all the six condemned and restored their convictions of manslaughter and 18-year prison terms. The court stated that there was not proven beyond a reasonable doubt that the six appellants had the prerequisite intention to commit murder, although their actions of causing injuries to Zulfarhan that led to his death satisfied the threshold of a manslaughter offence.

In response to the six killers escaping the gallows, Zulfarhan's father was saddened that the perpetrators escaped the death penalty for murdering his son. He revealed that two of the killers' families had met him in the past and expressed that they likewise were repulsed by their sons' actions. Zulfarhan's father stated he forgave them to an extent but not fully, as he believed his son would never do such vicious things as the six. Zulfarhan's father stated he did not want to meet any of the killers after they came out of prison, as it would make him heartbroken.

== Societal response and aftermath ==
=== 2017 ===
When the incident first came to light, many people were shocked by the brutality behind the death of Zulfarhan. Given that there was another student named T. Nhaveen (aged 18 at the time of his death) who was bullied and killed by five youths in Penang during the following week after Zulfarhan was murdered, the issue of bullying in schools and higher educational institutions began to gain traction in the public spotlight. Then Deputy Prime Minister Ahmad Zahid Hamidi also assured the public a few months after the murder of Zulfarhan and other bullying cases that the government would implement new measures to curb the phenomenon of bullying in society. Then Prime Minister Najib Razak also offered condolences to the victims' families in these above cases, and urged all citizens of Malaysia to make it a priority to develop people's morals besides physical infrastructure. Civil groups and members of the society called for the government to implement harsher laws and legalize more education on bullying in order to prevent such cases in future. Zulfarhan's mother, who heard about the death of Nhaveen, offered her condolences to Nhaveen's bereaved kin and sympathized with their pain of losing a child.

The seriousness of the incident and circumstances behind Zulfarhan's unnatural death and bullying prompted calls for a transparent investigation. The university and the Higher Education Ministry both agreed to conduct a formal investigation and probe into the bullying and subsequent death of Zulfarhan, and cooperate with the Malaysian Armed Forces and Royal Malaysia Police to solve the case. Residents living in Zulfarhan's place of residence were similarly shocked at the fact that a fellow resident died a horrific death. Malaysia Medical Association president Dr Ravindran R. Naidu also advocated that based on the facts of the case, doctors in the future should be more involved in cases where they encounter patients with questionable injuries. Human Rights Commission of Malaysia (Suhakam) expressed their understanding that justice was necessitated in this case, but added that a severe prosecution by the law was insufficient to send a strong signal to prevent bullying and address the root of the issue, and it required the collective effort of society (including parents, teachers, students, community and religious leaders) and government to stem this lingering problem. Defence Minister Datuk Seri Hishammuddin Hussein also stated that there was a need to overhaul the education system at UPNM to address the problem of bullying, and the university needed to take responsibility of the incident.

=== 2019 ===
A few days after he was acquitted of assaulting Zulfarhan, in August 2019, Muhammad Akmal Akif Alias, the 19th defendant of the trial, told a newspaper in an interview that he was remorseful and wanted to say sorry to Zulfarhan, with whom he shared a close friendship, for what happened to him and for failing to save him, and he regularly prayed for him. Muhammad Akmal Akif, who consistently maintained his innocence, stated that the trial proceedings and investigations affected him and his family, because it was not a good thing to have a criminal charge hanging over him and since his father was a former police officer, some people had treated his family with contempt. It was further reported that aside from the witness Muhammad Aiman, Muhammad Akmal Akif had also tried to write letters to inform about Zulfarhan's condition and his need for medical attention. Muhammad Akmal Akif also hoped that people should not judge something based on the outlook alone, but to fully assess the entire case and turn of events first before making a conclusion. After his acquittal, Muhammad Akmal Akif and his family reportedly also met up with Zulfarhan's parents face to face, and he apologized to them. He also wished to return to the university to complete his studies, and hoped the university could allow him to return after it expelled him and the other 18 accused persons of the case. As of 2019, Muhammad Akmal Akif was working in small businesses, and had been active in association activities.

=== 2021 ===
In November 2021, after the sentencing of the 18 abusers by the Kuala Lumpur High Court, the Ministry of Defence expressed their hope that no similar incidents that befell on Zulfarhan would happen to any other members of the military in the future, and Deputy Defence Minister Datuk Seri Ikmal Hisham Abdul Aziz respected the court's decision.

Anti-death penalty group Malaysians Against Death Penalty & Torture (MADPET) criticized the prosecution for appealing against the acquittal of the six killers, as they found it fair to imprison these six for 18 years on manslaughter charges, and stated that the prosecution should not seek the death penalty for the murder of Zulfarhan.

=== 2022 ===
In an interview in June 2022, Zulfarhan's father expressed his opposition to the planned abolition of mandatory capital punishment, as he feared that life imprisonment would not be an effective deterrent to serious crimes and the absence of capital punishment might bring about an increase in violent crimes.

=== 2024 ===
In January 2024, Zulfarhan's mother stated she was still unable to forget and let go of her son's death, and hoped for the killers to suffer the same pain as her son did before he died.

Throughout the following years, the murder of Zulfarhan was widely regarded as one of Malaysia's high-profile cases of bullying that shocked the whole of society since 2017. The Court of Appeal's decision to sentence the six main perpetrators to death for murder in July 2024 was widely taken as a strong message from the Malaysian judiciary towards the seriousness of bullying in Malaysia.

In July 2024, MADPET criticized the Court of Appeal for sentencing the six murderers of the Zulfarhan case to death. Expressing their stance of opposition against capital punishment, the group stated that the rights of the defendants should be upheld and they asked that justice should be tempered with mercy and compassion, and stated that the six should be given imprisonment terms of around 30 to 40 years for murder, and claimed that the death sentence was manifestly excessive and posed a great disparity compared to the four-year jail terms meted out to the 12 other accomplices.

After receiving news of the death sentence being meted out in 2024, Suhakam released a media statement, offering their deepest condolences to Zulfarhan's family while maintaining their stance against the death penalty. The group asked the judiciary to not execute the six killers responsible for Zulfarhan's murder, stating that the death penalty was an irreversible form of punishment that did not allow some room for rehabilitation and hoped for a more humane and just outcome in this case. Human rights group Amnesty International similarly criticized the decision of the Court of Appeal, stating that the death penalty should not be imposed regardless of the gravity of the crime and they pledged to continue seeking the complete abolition of capital punishment in Malaysia, and claimed that addressing the root causes of crime should take priority over harsh sentencing, the latter option which the group described as a way of "perpetuating a cycle of trauma and violence".

On the other hand, many more people found the sentence fair and just in this case. A writer of an opinion piece in Malay Mail found that the death penalty was legally imposed under the rule of law, and alluded to the fact that its constitutionality was affirmed more than 40 years ago in the landmark case of Bachan Singh v. State of Punjab by the Supreme Court of India, where the "rarest of the rare" principle first came to fruition, based on the Supreme Court's 4–1 majority decision that the death penalty should be reserved for the "rarest of the rare" cases of murder where they fit the classification as the gravest cases of extreme culpability and depravity, and carried other aggravating factors (such as premeditation and outrage of the community's feelings), and this was seemingly echoed by the Court of Appeal's decision to sentence Zulfarhan's six killers to hang for the cold-blooded and "rarest of the rare" murder of Zulfarhan.

The Malaysia Crime Prevention Foundation (MCPF) also agreed with the Court of Appeal's decision to sentence all the six murderers to the death penalty and found it an appropriate and fair sentence for the cold-blooded murder of Zularhan, and they criticized Suhakam's opposition to the sentence, emphasizing that all judges in Malaysia had the rights to impose either the death penalty or long prison sentences of 30 to 40 years in cases of murder (depending on the circumstances), citing that even the United States also carried out the death sentence for convicted killers regularly. A spokesperson of the MCPF aso condemned the acts of torture exhibited in Zulfarhan's case, citing that acts of torture that caused someone's death were unacceptable and blatantly violated the human norms (especially when perpetuated by highly educated people) and an act of killing a person was considered a forbidden act in Islam. The PAS Scholars Council also affirmed their support for the death penalty, stating that it was still relevant for serious crimes. Dr Ahmad Yahaya, representing the council, responded to Suhakam's statement by describing the death penalty as a form of rehabilitation of society in general to cleanse society of serious crimes like murder, and they understood the grief of Zulfarhan's family. A criminal and human rights lawyer Dinesh Muthal stated that while he personally opposed the death penalty, he understood clearly the reasoning behind the court's decision, which he supported as a warning against those who were responsible for continuous streaks of bullying and torture.

During the same month when the six Zulfarhan murderers were sentenced to hang, Dr Muzaffar Syah Mallow, the associate professor of the Faculty of Syariah & Law, Universiti Sains Islam Malaysia, wrote an opinion piece that after analyzing the case, he found that the reasons behind the case were the lack of supervision by university management and ineffective or outdated policies to address bullying, as well as the assumption that bullying did not happen in universities due to the students being expected to be mature and smart, and he stated that the murder of Zulfarhan highlighted the importance of policy and law to deal with the phenomenon of bullying.

In response to the verdict of death in July 2024, Mariam Mokhtar stated that the murder of Zulfarhan was likely one of Malaysia's worst crimes committed by young offenders. She stated that while the killing of Zulfarhan was strongly attributed to the callous and heinous actions of the six killers, the case also showed that the problem of bullying was not solely about the victim and perpetrator but also those who did not intervene or condone it, and the school management and medical professionals who were involved one way or another in Zulfarhan's case would have had opportunities to intervene or avert the tragedy that befell on Zulfarhan, which signaled the need to stem the phenomenon of bullying.

Muhammad Aiman Aufa Asmadi Affendi, the author of the poison pen letters, stated in July 2024 that he was surprised to see the contents of the letter circulated in social media and said he never saw it again after sending it. He offered his condolences to Zulfarhan's family, adding that he hoped he could have done more to help Zulfarhan while he was still alive.

In a speech to students at the International Islamic University Malaysia (IIUM), Tunku Azizah Aminah Maimunah Iskandariah, the Tengku Ampuan (Queen consort) of the state of Pahang, also highlighted that the murder of Zulfarhan should serve as a lesson against bullying, adding that it was not worth for youngsters to enter university only to end up facing the gallows, and she stated that everyone present should not think that their actions would not destroy themselves. Tunku Azizah also expressed her hope that similar incidents should not occur again and urged students to treat each other well like their own siblings.

Dr Shazleen Mohamed and Dr Shafezah Abdul Wahab, who were lecturers affiliated to the Faculty of Communication & Media Studies, MARA University of Technology, also spoke up against the issue of cyber-bullying and school bullying at institutions of higher education, and they referred to the case of Zulfarhan to show the tragic and potentially unforeseen consequences of bullying, and the severe moral and legal implications that may come from bullying. The lecturers also stated that the death penalty imposed on the six Zulfarhan murderers was a clear example of the law's stance of bullying and people should respect life and basic rights of every individual, which was very important.

Defence Minister Datuk Seri Mohamed Khaled Nordin released a media statement nearly a week after the Court of Appeal's verdict, stating that as a military university established by the government, UPNM should make sure that no similar tragedies parallel to the murder of Zulfarhan should happen again, as the university was a place to nurture future members of the Malaysian Armed Forces for the nation's defence. Minister Mohamed Khaled noted that ever since the murder of Zulfarhan, there were no more such incidents occurring at the university, suggesting that UPNM had learned from the incident and took appropriate action, and he additionally urged every parent to pay more attention to their children and ensure a healthier upbringing and learning to not allow them take up negative habits like bullying. In response, Mariam Mokhtar raised the fact that the relevant ministers and the vice-chancellor of UPNM did not seem to realize the gravity of bullying. She stated that the failure to properly address matters after the death sentence would not reassure any students of the university's current batch or their parents in relation to any anti-bullying policies of UPNM, and criticized the defence minister for providing a "brief, non-committal statement" about the crime. She alao added that there may be no reported cases of bullying, which did not equate to no bullying going on. She also stated that the lack of specific details on any measures undertaken to address the issue of bullying was also not satisfactory in reassuring the public and especially the parents who were concerned with their children's safety.

During an interview with Harian Metro's podcast, Zulfarhan's parents, Zulkarnain Idros and Hawa Osman, said that they refused to meet the family members of all six accused in their son's murder case, citing that it has been too late for them to apologize since they had not done so back then when the trial was ongoing, although he added that the father of one of the defendants did approach him to apologise. Zulkarnain also harshly condemned the human rights groups for seeking mercy on his son's killers, pointing out that they never for once spoke up against the inhumane torture inflicted on his son and yet they sought to seek mercy for the wrongdoers in furtherance of their agenda to abolish the death penalty.

== See also ==
- Capital punishment in Malaysia
