= Syria Relief =

Humanitarian organization

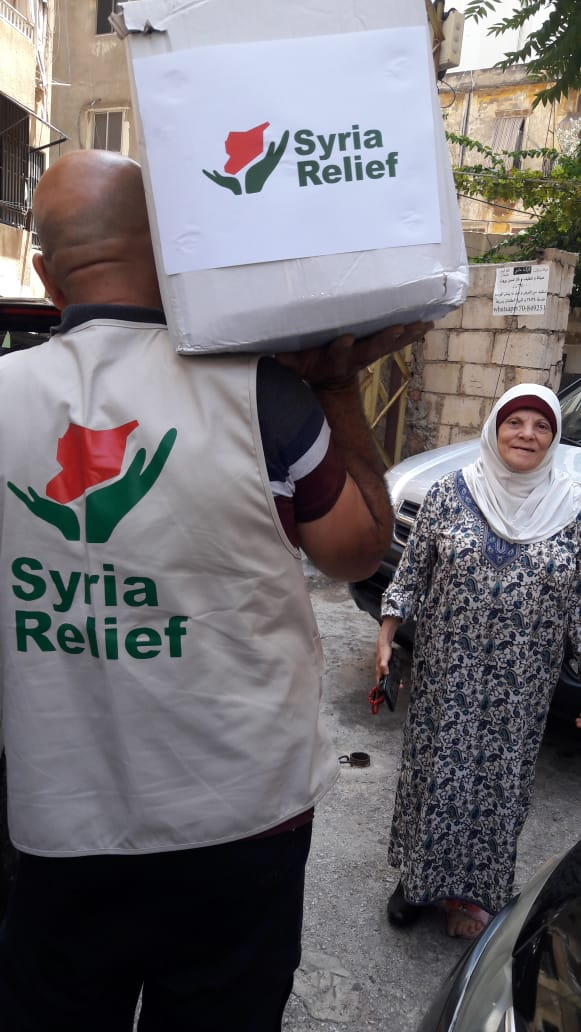
- Syria Relief aid worker carrying an emergency foodpack, Beirut, August 2020
- Founded: 2011
- Type: International NGO
- Purpose: Emergency Relief, Health, Education, Orphans and Child Welfare
- Headquarters: Manchester, United Kingdom
- Region served: Syria
- Key people: CEO: Othman Moqbel Chair of Trustees: Ayman Jundi Head of Communications and Advocacy: Charles Lawley
- Income: £22.1 million (2018)
- Disbursements: £21.8 million
- Employees: 1,700
- Website: www.syriarelief.org.uk

Syria Relief is the largest Syria-focused NGO in the United Kingdom. Syria Relief stated that they "are dedicated to alleviating the suffering and supporting the future of Syrians who have been affected by the crisis, mainly inside Syria." Syria Relief was formed in 2011 at the start of the Syrian Civil War, since then they have reached millions of people, distributing "hundreds of millions" worth of aid. The charity was initially set up as a short-term humanitarian aid project at the start of the conflict, however it has since grown in size. The charity operates a total of 306 schools in Syria, more than any other NGO, and 14 hospitals and healthcare centers.

== Humanitarian programmes ==
As well as distributing aid and monitoring displacement, one of the main focuses of Syria Relief's work are health related projects within Syria. Syria Relief's trustees are mainly British doctors and the organisation provides medical help through training and paying the wages of doctors within Syria. Syria Relief worked with Save The Children, doctors and researchers to produce the world's first manual into treating children injured by explosives, which Syria Relief began distributing to emergency units across northwest Syria in May 2019. Syria Relief have also pushed for DfID to fund 3D printed prosthetic limbs for children in Syria who have become victims of the conflict.

In October 2019, one of Syria Relief's Primary Healthcare Centres became the target of a shell attack, where 7 were injured, by over 5 shells. Vital equipment and medicines were destroyed in the attack. It was described as a "deliberate attack." In February 2020, another of Syria Relief's healthcare centres was destroyed and a member of staff was killed in an air strike.

Providing schooling for Syrian children is another key aspect of Syrian Relief's work, during the ongoing Idlib offensive, six of the 306 schools that Syria Relief run across the country were hit by airstrikes.

As of November 2019 their humanitarian aid programmes includes:

- Running 3 hospitals, 2 mobile clinics, 3 primary health centres, 7 family planning clinics and a prosthetic limbs centre, helping over 250,000 people each year.
- Running 159 schools, with organisations such as Save the Children and UNICEF, helping approximately 55,592 children.
- Providing vocational training, cash for work and small business support and rehabilitation of farming, oil production and water treatment, helping nearly 20,000 people.
- Providing clean water facilities for over 1.5 million people.

Outside of Syria, Syria Relief have provided emergency aid to the victims of the August 2020 Beirut explosion and those in lockdown during the Coronavirus pandemic near their UK headquarters in Tameside.

== Advocacy ==
Syria Relief have made efforts to raise awareness of the crisis in Syria, keeping it on the media agenda. In September 2019, they released a report detailing the impact of the deliberate targeting of schools is having on Syrian children, highlighting a spike in illiteracy in areas where schools are hit by airstrikes. In August 2019, they commissioned a YouGov poll which found that 20% of the UK said they did not know if the conflict was still ongoing and 3% believed it has stopped completely. In January 2019, Syria Relief released figures detailing that approximately 75% of children in Idlib are suffering from post-traumatic stress disorder and 50% are suffering from incontinence.

== Supporters ==
Surgeon David Nott has worked with Syria Relief since 2016, to treat patients in Syria and increase capacity of Syrian doctors. In March 2018, 21 British Members Of Parliament from all parties signed an Early Day Motion specifically praising the work undertaken by Syria Relief, the signatories included Christine Jardine, Sir Peter Bottomley, Ronnie Campbell, Tim Farron and Jim Shannon.

In 2021, Syria Relief released a report, authored by the organisation's Head Of Communications and Advocacy, Charles Lawley, into the prevalence of Post-traumatic stress disorder symptoms amongst Syrian refugees and Internally Displaced People, which found that 75% of respondents may have PTSD.
