= Osman Nuri Koptagel =

Officer of the Ottoman Army and a general of the Turkish Army

Osman Nuri Koptagel 1311-b-P. 17
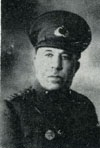
- Born: 1874; Erzincan, Ottoman Empire
- Died: 22 November 1942 (aged 67–68); Ankara, Turkey
- Burial place: State Cemetery
- Military career
- Allegiance: Ottoman Empire; Turkey
- Service years: Ottoman Empire: 1900–1919; Turkey: 1919 – 8 May 1924
- Rank: Major general
- Commands: Muş Training Center, 43rd Division, 27th Division, 43rd Division; 12th Division, president of the martial court of Adapazarı, member of military courts of generals, president of the 1 no military court, 7th Division, member of the Military Supreme Court
- Conflicts: Balkan Wars; First World War; Turkish War of Independence
- Other work: Member of the GNAT (Malatya)

Osman Nuri Koptagel (1874; Erzincan – 22 November 1942; Ankara) was an officer of the Ottoman Army and a general of the Turkish Army.

When he was an assistant teaching staff of the Ottoman Military Academy, he used to order "Sağdan birinci manga, kop ta gel!" ("First squad from the right, separate (from line) and come!"), "Birinci mangadan sağdan itibaren beş kişi kop da gel!" ("First squad of five person from the right, separate (from line) and come!"). His students gave him a nickname "Kop ta gel". After the 1934 Surname Law, Mustafa Kemal gave him a surname "Koptagel".

His granddaughter Yüksel Koptagel (born 27 October 1931) is a Turkish composer and pianist.

== Medals and decorations ==
- Order of the Medjidie 4th class
- Silver Medal of Liyaqat
- Silver Medal of Imtiyaz
- Prussia Iron Cross
- Medal of Independence with Red Ribbon

== See also ==
- List of high-ranking commanders of the Turkish War of Independence
