= Financial mismanagement =

Misuse of monetary funds

Financial mismanagement is management that, deliberately or not, is handled in a way that can be characterized as "wrong, bad, careless, inefficient or incompetent" and that will reflect negatively upon the financial standing of a business or individual. There are many ways of how financial mismanagement is carried out. For example, the wrong distribution of responsibility, to be remiss with payments, bills and taxes and neglecting responsibility, financial problems and economical standing can cause great financial mismanagement and further on devastate your economy. By looking to various cases where the financial management has gone wrong we will be able to comprehend the effect financial mismanagement can have and how crucial it is for an economy's success to carry out well working financial management.

== History ==
Financial management has always been key to a successful business, and is crucial for an economy to function. There are not only companies and individuals that have economies that rely on financial management but also entire societies and countries.

== Examples ==
Throughout the years there have been countless companies, persons and also countries that have been declared bankrupt, caused by financial mismanagement:

- Argentina, with its many natural resources, well-educated workforce and export-oriented agricultural sector, is today Latin America's third largest economy, but the Argentine economy has been through quite a few ups and downs. In 2001 this led to a severe recession and ever-increasing poverty. The country's increasing public debt was one of the reasons for the recession.
- By the end of 2009 Greece experienced one of the most severe economical collapses in today's society. The crisis had severe results and resulted in great public poverty—for instance, in Athens, 20% of all shops were suddenly empty. In February of 2012, it was reported that 20,000 Greeks had been made destitute during the proceeding year. By years of unrestrained governmental spending, cheap lending and a failing try at implementing financial reforms Greece was left badly off when the global economical crisis struck and the country had loans they were completely unable to repay.
- In 2008 the company Lehman Brothers filed for bankruptcy, after being the fourth largest investment bank in the U.S. at the time. By lending severe amounts to fund the company's investing (notoriously, sub-prime mortgages), made the financial services firm extremely exposed to the financial downturn and subprime crisis.
- In 2021, the Federal Reserve issued six citations to Silicon Valley Bank for severe weaknesses in its risk management, particularly in handling cash reserves. Despite warnings, the bank did not address the issues, leading to a review in 2022 that revealed a flawed business model based on the assumption that higher interest rates would improve its financial position. In March 2023, the bank experienced a major run-and-fall scenario, causing widespread panic among customers and triggering government intervention. The primary issues were the lack of government-insured deposits and significant losses incurred from liquidating debt securities to meet customer withdrawals. These events raise questions about the roles of regulators in detecting and preventing disasters.

There are numerous examples of where finances are not managed right and where companies, individuals and even countries are liquidated, and even more examples where there has been episodes of financial mismanagement but the situation was still able to be escaped.

== Consequences ==
The consequences of financial mismanagement can be severe, and can affect individuals, businesses, and governments alike.

=== Governments ===
Governments that mismanage their finances can experience a decline in their economic growth and may be unable to provide important public services. This can lead to unrest among the citizens, and can ultimately cause social and political instability. Additionally, governments that are unable to manage their finances properly may be forced to take drastic measures, such as increasing taxes or reducing spending, in order to balance their budget.

=== Individuals ===
Individuals who mismanage their finances can incur substantial debts and may be unable to meet their financial obligations. This can lead to legal action, such as debt collection or even bankruptcy. Additionally, individuals may experience difficulty in obtaining credit or loans in the future.

=== Businesses ===
Businesses that mismanage their finances may experience a decline in their sales, decreased profits, and a decrease in their ability to attract new customers or clients. Poor financial management can also cause a business to incur substantial debts, which can lead to legal action or bankruptcy.

== Prevention ==
Financial mismanagement will always be a possible problem, for businesses, individuals and also entire countries.

- To prevent personal financial mismanagement it is important to have financial education from an early age.
- For a business to succeed in their finances it is crucial to employ people with the right qualifications and experiences and to continuously appraise the financial state within the business. See Financial risk management § Corporate finance.
- To enhance protection and potentially increase fundraising, it is crucial for businesses to implement appropriate financial processes and procedures. Trustees and senior management should lead the way by demonstrating the significance of robust financial protocols and providing guidance on change management.
- To establish a structured financial system, existing protocols should be reviewed and evaluated. The process should involve multiple trustees to maintain policy adherence, ensuring that transactions are thoroughly viewed and approved
- Continuous monitoring of financial processes is crucial, including policy adherence checks, bank reconciliation, monitoring financial performance against the budget, and establishing an internal audit committee or hiring an independent contractor to review accounts at the end of the financial year.
- Regular policy reviews are crucial to assess efficacy, identify areas for improvement, and make necessary adjustments, especially as policies are subject to constant evolution due to rapid technological advancements.
