= Islamic Relief =

UK-based international aid agency

Islamic Relief Worldwide
- Founded: 1984; 42 years ago
- Founder: Hany El-Banna
- Type: International NGO
- Purpose: Sustainable Livelihoods, Education, Health & Nutrition, Orphans and Child Welfare, Water Sanitation & Hygiene, Emergency Relief & Disaster Preparedness, Campaigning, Integrated development
- Headquarters: Birmingham, UK
- Region served: Worldwide
- Key people: CEO: Iftikhar Shaheen Chair of Trustees: Haroun Atallah
- Income: £275.6 million (2024)
- Website: islamic-relief.org

Islamic Relief Worldwide is an international non-governmental organization founded in the United Kingdom in 1984. It has international headquarters in Birmingham and a network of national offices, affiliated partners, registered branches and country offices spread over more than 40 countries.

The charity typically assists more than 10 million people each year through emergency response, and development programmes in areas including education, health and livelihood support. It also advocates on behalf of those in need, focusing particularly in its campaigns on climate change, the rights of women and girls, and supporting refugees and displaced people.

Islamic Relief has been registered with the Charity Commission of England and Wales since 1989 and is an independent, non-political non-governmental organisation. In 2024, Islamic Relief's income was £275.6 million.

== History ==
Islamic Relief was founded in 1984 by Dr Hany El-Banna and fellow students from the University of Birmingham. From its first donation of 20p, the charity raised £100,000 to help those affected by the famine in Sudan. Since then, Islamic Relief has grown into an international humanitarian organisation with an annual income of hundreds of millions and a presence in more than 40 countries across Europe, Africa, Asia, the Middle East, and North America.

=== 1990s ===
In 1993, Islamic Relief worked with UK-based newspaper The Independent on an appeal to raise funds for relief efforts during the Bosnian War. The appeal raised £37,000 for Islamic Relief and supported aid delivery throughout the conflict, including during the Siege of Sarajevo.

In 1994, Islamic Relief became the first Muslim non-governmental organisation to receive UK government funding when it was awarded £180,000 to support a training centre in North Kordofan, Sudan.

The following year, the charity was the first international relief agency on the ground delivering aid to the Chechen capital, Grozny, after war broke out in the territory. Islamic Relief supplied food, blankets, clothes and medicine to those affected by the fighting.

Islamic Relief became a signatory of the International Red Cross and Red Crescent Movement's Code of Conduct in 1999, committing to this international standard of how to provide aid to people affected by emergencies in a non-biased manner. Humanity, neutrality, impartiality and independence are the code's core principles.

=== 2000s ===
In 2002, Islamic Relief signed a Framework Partnership with the European Commission's Humanitarian Aid department, recognising the charity's capacity to deliver aid to a high standard.

Islamic Relief purports to have been one of the few international aid agencies assisting people in Iraq when war broke out in 2003, providing £9 million worth of aid to people in need.

In late 2004, Islamic Relief responded to the devastating Indian Ocean Tsunami, assisting some of the hardest-hit communities. It was Islamic Relief's largest-scale emergency response at the time and marked the beginning of the organisation's work in Indonesia.

In 2005, Islamic Relief launched its biggest-ever operation in the United States, supporting those affected by Hurricane Katrina. That same year, the charity joined the UK's Disasters Emergency Committee (DEC). It remains a member, along with 14 other major charities.

=== 2010s ===
In 2010, Islamic Relief launched a major relief and reconstruction operation in Pakistan after the country was hit by the worst floods in living memory at the time. Its work benefited some 428,000 people in more than 580 villages, the charity has reported.

2014 saw Islamic Relief begin a partnership with the Lutheran World Federation (LWF) – the first of its kind between global Islamic and Christian humanitarian organisations. The agreement formalised a programme of joint humanitarian project, policy, research and advocacy, focusing specifically on faith and protection issues.

The decade was punctuated by the conflicts in both Syria and Yemen which according to the United Nations has left a combined 29 million people as refugees.

=== 2020-2025 ===
The spread of COVID-19 impacted Islamic Relief's work around the world, delaying some projects and prompting new emergency responses to cope with the fallout of the pandemic. The charity continued to deliver aid in a safe manner, where possible, and transitioned some of its activities and events online.

In 2020, the International Federation of Islamic Relief entities launched a new global governance framework, establishing an International General Assembly from which representatives from around the world elect Islamic Relief Worldwide's board of trustees.

In 2021, Islamic Relief was recertified against the prestigious Core Humanitarian Standard on Quality and Accountability (CHS), a rigorous standard made up of nine commitments designed to ensure charities best meet the needs of the communities they serve. At the time, Islamic Relief was one of only five UK-based charities to hold the full independent certification, which will last until May 2025. The charity was first certified against the CHS in 2017.

In 2022, Islamic Relief marked World Refugee Day with a joint conference with the LWF, and another of its close faith-based partners HIAS, on 'Welcoming the Stranger'.

In 2022, the charity responded as devastating flooding swept across Pakistan. Islamic Relief provided food, water, shelter and other emergency items to affected people, continuing to support communities in the months that followed the disaster. By the end of the year, Islamic Relief had assisted over 1 million people and raised over £10 million to support communities affected by the flooding.

In 2023, Islamic Relief launched major responses and appeals to address crises, including the Türkiye-Syria earthquake, the outbreak of conflict in Sudan and the unprecedented escalation in violence in Gaza.

The charity also published its new 10-year Global Strategy, laying out how it would seek to achieve three core outcomes: saving lives and reducing vulnerability to humanitarian crises, empowering communities to tackle poverty and vulnerability, and advocating for change to eliminate the global and local root causes of inequality.

In 2024, Islamic Relief continued to deliver aid in Gaza, Lebanon and Syria as their differing humanitarian crises deepened. The organisation also scaled up its support in Sudan as the crisis reached catastrophic to become the largest displacement crisis anywhere in the world. Islamic Relief reached more than 1.1 million people in Sudan with humanitarian support in 2024.

== Islamic Relief's work ==
=== Vision and mission ===
Islamic Relief's work is guided by the values and teachings of the Qur'an and Sunnah, the prophetic example. These shape the organisation's five key values: ikhlas (sincerity), ihsan (excellence), rahma (compassion), adl (social justice), and amana (custodianship).

Islamic Relief serves communities in need regardless of race, political affiliation, gender or belief, working to provide lasting routes out of poverty and to empower individuals to transform their lives.

It envisages a caring world where communities are empowered, social obligations are fulfilled, and people respond as one to the suffering of others. It is committed to the principle of Do No Harm, striving to ensure aid is appropriate for the communities it serves, and to understand and minimise any potential negative impacts of aid delivery.

=== Humanitarian programmes ===
Islamic Relief responds to humanitarian crises around the world, aiming to reduce the impact of conflicts and natural disasters. The charity focuses on rapid response, providing emergency relief and protecting vulnerable people. It also helps communities and governments to prepare for future incidents through disaster risk reduction programmes.

Some of the major emergency interventions launched by Islamic Relief have included providing life-saving aid during the Bosnian War in the 1990s, providing medical assistance during the wars in Afghanistan and Iraq, and managing refugee camps in Darfur, Sudan. The charity has also responded to devastating natural disasters including the 2004 Indian Ocean earthquake and tsunami, the Kashmir earthquake in 2005 and a severe drought in the Horn of Africa in 2011.

In 2024, Islamic Relief reported that it had reached 14.5 million people across 38 countries in 2024 through emergency response, development and campaigning projects.

The charities current emergency appeals include supporting communities uprooted by violence in Gaza and Sudan, and delivering vital food aid to 2 million people at risk of famine and disease in Yemen each month. Other current appeals include supporting communities devastated by earthquakes in Afghanistan and Myanmar, and floods in Pakistan.

Islamic Relief also runs annual seasonal programmes, including Ramadan and qurbani food distributions, and a winter programme through which blankets, fuel and other essentials are provided to help people in need survive the colder months. These programmes reach millions of people each year.

=== Development programmes ===
Islamic Relief's development programmes aim to empower individuals and communities to emerge from poverty and become more self-reliant. The programmes focus on providing solutions to the challenges faced by those in need, and include climate adaptation, livelihood support, and orphan sponsorship.

In 2011, Islamic Relief began a Programme Partnership Agreement with the UK government's Department for International Development, now the Foreign, Commonwealth and Development Office, recognising the charity's capacity to contribute to the Millennium Development Goals (MDGs). Islamic Relief's development strategy has been consistently aligned to support the UN Sustainable Development Goals (SDGs).

The charity reported that in 2024, more than 4.6 million people received life-changing support through 407 development projects. Those assisted through these projects included more than 97,700 orphaned children through the Orphan Sponsorship Programme, while seasonal Ramadan and qurbani programmes helped ease the hunger of more than 1 million and 3 million people.

Islamic Relief also supported over 1.6 million people with healthcare interventions and provided better access to water,

=== Advocacy and campaigning ===
==== Climate change ====
In August 2015, Islamic Relief launched the Islamic Declaration on Climate Change with GreenFaith and the Islamic Foundation for Ecology and Environmental Sciences. It called on Muslim communities to take an active role in climate action at local, national and international levels. The Declaration makes an Islamic faith-endorsed case for protecting the environment and was supported by global Muslim leaders.

In 2023, Islamic Relief assisted more than 205,000 people to adapt and build resilience to the negative impacts of climate change, and produced a report on the vital role local actors play in such interventions.

==== Women and girls ====
In 2018, Islamic Relief announced a forthcoming Declaration of Gender Justice in Islam. The Declaration is a call to action against gender inequality from an Islamic faith perspective and seeks to tackle discrimination and harmful practices, especially against women and girls in Muslim communities.

The Declaration is expected to be launched publicly in late 2022 as part of a new global campaign to empower women and girls and tackle gender inequality. The Declaration and the campaign are part of Islamic Relief's gender justice work, which includes tackling early and forced marriage, domestic violence and female genital mutilation/cutting (FGM/C). In 2023, Islamic Relief offices around the world invited men and boys to join efforts to combat FGM/C in a campaign aiming to address the root causes of the harmful practice by engaging men and boys as allies in transforming the social and gender norms that perpetuate FGM/C.

In November 2024, Islamic Relief were in attendance at COP29 in Baku, Azerbaijan, representing an interfaith caucus at the conference, addressing the ministry plenary session and speaking at a number of events.

==== Refugees and displaced people ====
In 2013, Islamic Relief was one of several faith-inspired organisations to work with the UN High Commissioner for Refugees[CM9] on an inter-faith affirmation. The charity also campaigns to help implement the UN's Global Compact on Refugees, an historic agreement that includes specific recognition of the role of faith-based organisations and local faith communities in welcoming those forced to flee their homes.

In 2023, Islamic Relief continued supporting refugees and displaced people around the world, including hundreds of Ukrainian refugees living in Poland.

In 2024, Islamic Relief invested over £3 million to support refugees and asylum seekers those facing hardship in the UK and also worked with the United Nations High Commissioner for Refugees (UNHCR) to create sustainable livelihoods for refugees and displaced peoples in Jordan.

==== Fundraising ====
Islamic Relief raises funds through various channels including online donations, charity shops, and corporate giving. In 2023, the charity reported that it had raised a record £274.6 million through fundraising.

Islamic Relief is also the founder of Charity Week – a student volunteer-led campaign to raise funds. In 2024, Charity Week engaged more than 20,000 volunteers across the globe and saw 153 UK educational institutions take part in the event which raised a total of £2.5 million.

== Structure and governance ==
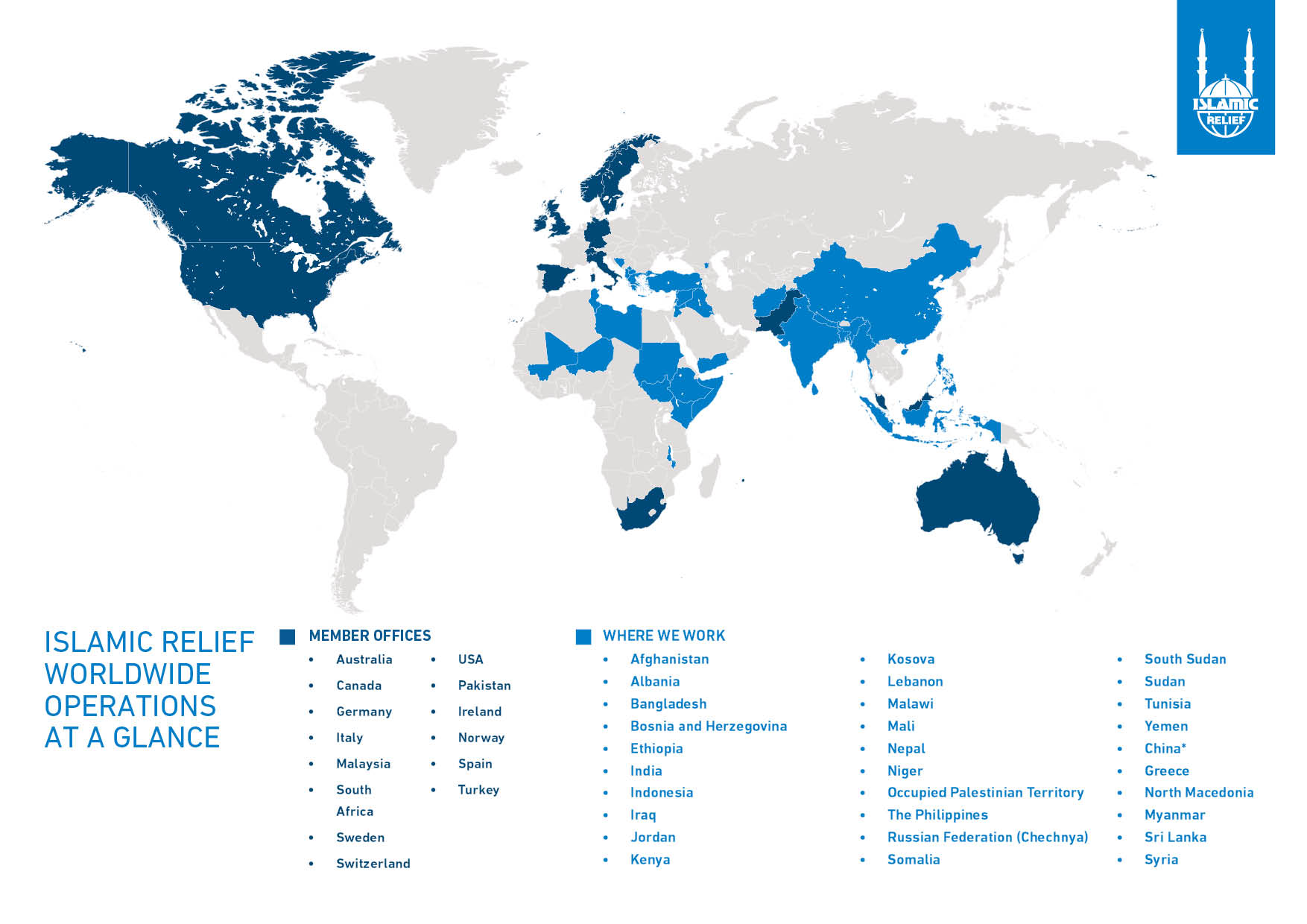
A 2022 map of where Islamic Relief works

The Islamic Relief federation is made up of member offices, which carry out fundraising on a national level, and country offices, which coordinate and implement projects to serve communities in need. Islamic Relief Worldwide, based in the UK, is the international office of the Islamic Relief federation. It oversees global standards and coordinates and monitors the work of country offices.

In 2020 as part of a wide governance reform programme Islamic Relief created the International General Assembly (IGA). This is the highest body of the new Islamic Relief Worldwide governance structure and consists mainly of representatives elected by Islamic Relief member offices across five continents. It is through this body that the board of trustees are elected which is inclusive of member offices and independent members.

== Affiliated organisations ==
=== TIC International Ltd ===
TIC International is a trading subsidiary of Islamic Relief. It supports the charity's fundraising activities by recycling clothes and running a network of charity shops across the UK. It was set up in 1993 after Islamic Relief received an influx of clothes in response to emergency appeals. The Birmingham-based firm supports Islamic Relief's journey towards 'net zero' by recycling clothing that might otherwise be disposed of in landfill or in other ways that harm the environment.

In 2023, TIC converted 2,362 tonnes of unwanted clothing into income for Islamic Relief, either through re-selling high-quality items in the charity shops or through recycling to generate profits.

=== International Waqf Fund ===
The International Waqf Fund is Islamic Relief's investment vehicle. It was established in 2001 to boost the long-term financial sustainability of Islamic Relief investments and to generate returns for social impact, known as waqf in Islamic terminology.

Waqf enables Islamic Relief to decrease its dependency on donations and grants, as the annual yield from waqf investments provides income that funds social impact programmes. In 2021, Islamic Relief said the International Waqf endowments fund grew to £8.6 million.

=== Humanitarian Academy for Development ===
Formerly known as the Islamic Relief Academy, the Humanitarian Academy for Development (HAD) re-launched in 2018 as a centre for learning and research to benefit the humanitarian sector.

As well as training Islamic Relief staff, HAD offers training to other humanitarian practitioners. In 2024, HAD partnered with the UK Foreign, Commonwealth & Development Office (FCDO) to deliver training for a number of Sudanese non-governmental organisations, aiming to empower local humanitarians to deliver a more resilient and locally led humanitarian response.

== Memberships and key partnerships ==
Islamic Relief is a member of the United Nations' Economic and Social Council and is a signatory to the International Red Cross and Red Crescent Movement's Code of Conduct. It is also a member of Bond and the Disasters Emergency Committee.

Islamic Relief is the co-owner of the International Civil Society Centre, a global action platform, and an affiliate member of the INGO Accountability Charter Company. The charity is also part of the global Make Poverty History coalition, which is campaigning to end extreme poverty.

Islamic Relief also makes up part of the Beyond 2015 coalition, which aims to influence the development framework that will replace the Millennium Development Goals. In 2014, it signed a Memorandum of Understanding to cooperate in humanitarian work with the Lutheran World Federation (LWF), and in 2015 formed a partnership with the African Union to tackle chronic poverty on the continent. In 2024, Islamic signed a Memorandum of Understanding with the Misr El Kheir Foundation (MEK) that will see the two organisations work together to support people in desperate need in Gaza, as well as Palestinian refugees in Egypt.

The charity's Annual Report 2024 lists its key partners as: Arab Fund for Economic and Social Development (AFESD), Bond, CHS Alliance, Church of Sweden, Climate Action Network International, Disasters Emergency Committee (DEC), Finn Church Aid, Foreign, Commonwealth and Development Office (FCDO), Gender and Development Network (GADN), Global Affairs Canada, Habitat for Humanity International, HelpAge, HIAS, Humanitarian Coalition, Inter-Agency Standing Committee (IASC), International Civil Society Centre, International Council of Voluntary Agencies (ICVA), International Organisation for Migration (IOM), Islamic Development Bank, Joint Learning Initiative (JLI), Joint United Nations Programme on HIV/AIDS (UNAIDS), Lutheran World Federation, Misr El Kheir Foundation, NetHope, Network for Religious & Traditional Peacebuilders (NRTP), PARD, Qatar Charity, Qatar Red Crescent, Save the Children UK, Sheikh Abdullah Al Nouri Charity Society, Shelter Box UK, Sida (Swedish International Development Cooperation Agency), START Network, TZU Chi Foundation, UN Office for the Coordination of Humanitarian Affairs (OCHA), UN Refugee Agency (UNHCR), UN World Food Programme (WFP), United Nations Children's Fund (UNICEF), United Nations Development Programme (UNDP), World Vision, Zakat House.

== Awards ==
Islamic Relief has received various awards from governments and institutions in recognition of its humanitarian work over the decades. These include:

- Lord Mayor of Birmingham Community Care Award, 1993
- Government of Pakistan's 'Star of Dedication' Award in recognition of response to 2005 earthquake, 2006
- Sakakawa Award for Disaster Risk Reduction in Bangladesh, won as part of the National Alliance for Risk Reduction and Response Initiative, 2013
- British Muslim Awards 'Charity of the Year', 2013
- Third Sector Awards 'Marketing Campaign of the Year' for 2018 Ramadan Campaign
- Special Commendation in the 'Digital Innovation' category for Virtue Reality digital game, 2018
- Bond International Development Award for "Eliminating Extreme Poverty through Alternative Livelihoods for Orphaned Families", 2019
- Third Sector Award, Charity of the Year, 2022
- Charity Times Awards, Charity of the Year, 2023 in particular recognition of response to 2022 Pakistan floods and 2023 Türkiye-Syria earthquake.

== Controversies ==
=== Alleged links to Hamas ===
In June 2014, Israel added Islamic Relief to a list of organisations banned from operating in the country, alleging that the charity was funding Hamas. The charity's West Bank offices were raided, during which time computers were destroyed, files were confiscated, and an office safe was forcibly opened.

Islamic Relief denied the allegations and, in late 2014, an audit carried out by the leading global audit firm, KPMG, found no evidence of any link to terrorism. The Israeli government responded by stating its decision to declare Islamic Relief illegal was "based on information that has been accumulated over years" and claimed that Islamic Relief was "a central player in the financing of Hamas".

Islamic Relief denies this allegation and continues to challenge the decision in Israeli courts.

=== Alleged ties to Muslim Brotherhood ===
In 2014, the United Arab Emirates designated Islamic Relief as a terrorist organisation over alleged ties to the Muslim Brotherhood. Islamic Relief denied such links, stating that the charity is a "purely humanitarian aid organisation". In March 2023, a New Yorker investigation reported that the UAE had hired private investigators to try to find ties between Islamic Relief and the Muslim Brotherhood, with the intent of influencing Western media outlets. The New Yorker and the Associated Press have related the UAE's campaign to a wider conflict between the UAE and Qatar.

In December 2020, the German government stated in a response to a question to parliament that it had stopped funding the Islamic Relief by January 2020, and that Islamic Relief had significant personal connections to the Muslim Brotherhood. In 2021, Dutch minister Sigrid Kaag stated that Islamic Relief would not receive subsidies due to these alleged ties. Islamic Relief has been investigated by British and Swedish authorities. Banks around the world have threatened to stop transferring Islamic Relief funds to crisis zones.

=== Antisemitism ===
In July 2020, one of several directors at Islamic Relief, Heshmat Khalifa, resigned after The Times discovered he had made antisemitic remarks on his Facebook page in 2014 and 2015. In an interview with The Guardian, then-CEO Naser Haghamed said he was "appalled" by the "unacceptable posts", which included labelling Egyptian President Abdel Fattah el-Sisi a "pimp son of the Jews" and calling the Israeli government the "grandchildren of monkeys and pigs".

In late August 2020, Islamic Relief announced that its entire board would be resigning in a long-planned move that was described as "a part of far-reaching governance reforms" that had been over five years in the making.

In January 2021, the Charity Commission of England and Wales completed a compliance case into Islamic Relief, stating that it was "satisfied that it [Islamic Relief] is making the necessary improvements in terms of the vetting of trustees, and ongoing oversight over their social media activities."

Later that month, an Independent Commission helmed by the former Attorney General for England and Wales Dominic Grieve concluded that "the offensive views articulated by the former senior director and two former trustees did not in any way compromise the impartiality or integrity of the organization's humanitarian programmes."

=== Other controversies ===
In 2016, The Sunday Times reported that the banking group HSBC had decided to sever ties with Islamic Relief. The charity confirmed that in 2014 HSBC had invited it to "end the relationship" before doing so itself after the charity refused.

HSBC did not state publicly why the relationship had been terminated but said such decisions "would typically include the type of activities the business is involved in, the jurisdictions in which it operates and the products and services it uses."

Islamic Relief said it was told that HSBC needed to "manage the challenge" posed by customers operating in "high-risk jurisdictions". The charity called on banks to ensure their de-risking measures did not impact people in need of humanitarian aid.

In 2017, the government of Bangladesh was reported to have barred Islamic Relief from aiding the Rohingya people in Cox's Bazar, but made no specific allegation. Islamic Relief was subsequently approved to operate in Cox's Bazar. As of July 2022, the government of Bangladesh was working with Islamic Relief to aid Rohingya refugees.

In September 2025, the broadcaster GB News publicly apologised to the organisation for broadcasting the allegation that allegation that Islamic Relief has funded terrorist groups. In December 2025 if was confirmed that GB News had also paid damages over the claim.

In September 2026, Islamic Relief Worldwide’s International General Assembly unanimously voted to expel Islamic Relief USA (IRUSA) from the Islamic Relief federation with immediate effect. The decision followed a dispute between the organizations that culminated in IRUSA filing a federal lawsuit against IRW in March 2026. IRW said that IRUSA’s actions had damaged trust and the work of the wider federation, and stated that IRUSA would no longer be entitled to use the Islamic Relief name or associated assets unless a governance-compliant arrangement was established. IRUSA, which had suspended its association with IRW in October 2025, characterized the expulsion as a bad-faith action taken during court-ordered dispute-resolution proceedings and said that it would continue operating independently as a U.S.-registered nonprofit.

== See also ==
- List of charitable foundations
