= Yinka Babalola =

Nigeria Humanitarian and engineer

- Born: Olayinka Hakeem Babalola; Oyo state
- Citizenship: Nigeria
- Occupation: Engineer
- Organization: Rotary International

Olayinka Hakeem Babalola is a Nigerian business consultant and humanitarian,who is elected as the Rotary international president for 2026/2027 Rotary year. He was the second African to held the position.

== Early life/Career ==
Babalola was born in Ibadan, Nigeria. He attended university and finished with a degree in engineering in 1988.He spent 25 years in the oil and gas industry, including key roles at Shell PLC. Babalola's professional associations include the Nigerian Society of Engineers, the Institute of Safety Professionals of Nigeria, and the Association of Change Management Professionals. He is a member of Jericho Businessmen Club, an organization in his natal city of Ibadan that gives feedback to governments on economic and social policies.

== Honour/Awards ==
His humanitarian imprint includes work as a trustee of ShelterBox UK and director of the Safe Blood Africa project.

=== Honour ===
- Africa Centennial Heroes Award.
- RI Service Above Self Award.
- The Rotary Foundation Citation for Meritorious Service.

== Married Life ==
He is married to Preba Babalola,and the reside in Port Harcourt Nigeria.
