= Stefan Groesser =

German economist

Stefan N. Grösser (born May 1, 1978 in Göppingen (Germany) is a German economist, and professor of strategic management and dean at the Bern University of Applied Sciences.

== Life ==
From 2000 to 2004, Groesser studied Business Administration at the University of Stuttgart. After finishing his degree in business he continued studying at the University of Bergen, where he studied System Dynamics and completed a Master in Philosophy. Along with working at a consulting company he completed his PhD in Business Education at the University of St. Gallen in 2011. During his PhD studies he was also active as a guest researcher at the Sloan School of Management at the Massachusetts Institute of Technology.

From 2011 to 2017, Groesser was working as a professor for strategic management at the University of Applied Sciences in Bern, Switzerland. He acted as director of simulation labs (Lab for Business, Policy and Strategy) and as deputy head of the research field "Strategy and Entrepreneurship". Additionally he acted as Vice-President for the NGO ShelterBox in Switzerland.

In 2017, he helped initiating the bachelor's degree course in Industrial Engineering and Management at the Bern University of Applied Sciences and took the role of the dean.

== Research ==
Groesser's main research interests include strategic management, business models, mental models and simulation. He focuses particularly on the use of dynamic models and frameworks in strategic management and organizational development for better decision making in a complex world. He shows that models and computer simulations play an important role in individual and group-based decision making. His works contribute to increased awareness on that topic.

His current research interests include the analysis of circular business models for the solar energy/electricity industry as well as studies in the area of value chain-related supply shortages of medicines.

== Selection of published contributions ==
- (with Martin Schaffernicht) Competing in a New Market. A Dynamic Approach to Growth by Diffusion. Wiley-Publishing, 2018.
- (with Meike Tilebein, Sabina Jeschke, Thomas Fischer, Markus Schwaninger (Publ.)). Digitale Welten: Neue Ansätze in der Wirtschafts- und Sozialkybernetik: Konferenz für Wirtschafts- und Sozialkybernetik. KyWi 2014 vom 10. bis 11. Juli 2014 in Stuttgart, Berlin: Duncker & Humblot, 2017, ISBN 978-3-428-14949-0.
- (with Arcadio Reyes Lecuona & Göran Granholm (Publ.)) Dynamics of Long-Life Assets: From Technology Adaptation to Upgrading the Business Model, Cham: Springer International Publishing - Springer, 2017, ISBN 978-3-319-45437-5.
- Qualitative Modellierung mit System Dynamics. North Charleston: CreateSpace Independent Publishing Platform, 2016, - ISBN 978-1-5407-0702-4
- Co-Evolution of Standards in Innovation Systems: The Dynamics of Voluntary and Legal Building Codes. Physica, Heidelberg 2013, ISBN 978-3-7908-2857-3 (Dissertation, Universität St. Gallen, 2011).
- (edited with René Zeier) Systemic Management for Intelligent Organizations: Concepts, Models-Based Approaches and Applications. Springer, Heidelberg 2012, ISBN 978-3-642-29243-9.
- (with Jean-Paul Thommen) Economy, Company, Management. Versus, Zürich 2012, ISBN 978-3-03909-137-9.
