= Peter Eigen =

German lawyer (born 1938)

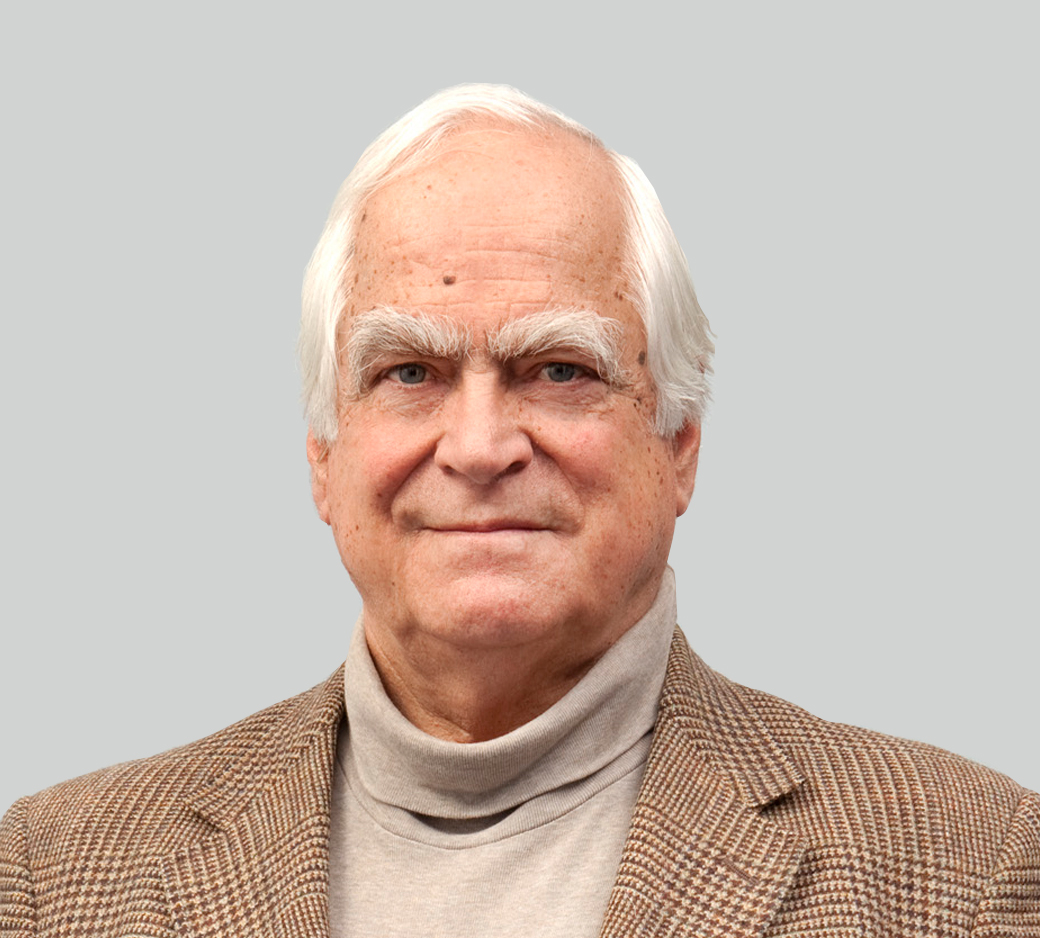
- Peter Eigen in 2012
- Born: June 11, 1938 (age 88); Augsburg, Bavaria, Germany
- Education: Harvard University, Free University of Berlin
- Occupations: Economist, lawyer, lecturer
- Known for: Anti-corruption advocacy, Political transparency, Political Science
- Spouse: Jutta Philippi (m. 1963)
- Children: 3
- Awards: Order of Merit of the Federal Republic of Germany, Theodor Heuss Prize (1998), European of the Year (2004), Markgräfler Gutedelpreis (2006)

Peter Eigen (born June 11, 1938) is a German lawyer and development economist. He is also the founder of Transparency International (TI), a non-governmental organization with national chapters in over 100 countries.

== Early life and education ==
Peter Eigen was born on June 11, 1938, in Augsburg, Germany, to Grete Eigen (born Müchler) and Fritz Eigen, an engineer and industry manager. Eigen spent his early childhood during World War II in Berlin and in Czechoslovakia, where his father had been assigned during the Nazi regime to manage a large factory.

After the war, Eigen moved back to Germany and settled in Mettmann with his grandparents, later relocating to Erlangen in 1952. He later studied law in Erlangen and Frankfurt, and earned a Doctor of Laws in 1964 (Dr. iur.) from Goethe Universität Frankfurt. From 1962 to 1963, he studied at the University of Kansas in the United States as a scholar of the Fulbright Program. During this time he took a four-month road trip through Latin America, an experience that informed his early interest in global governance.

== Career ==
=== Early career ===
Eigen worked as a regional director at the World Bank, but later left to pursue his anti-corruption efforts in Berlin.

=== Founding and Building Transparency International (TI) ===
Eigen's interest in combatting corruption led to the development of Transparency International (TI). In February 1993, he gathered approximately 20 individuals and experts in The Hague, Netherlands, where they signed the Founding Charter of Transparency International in the office of the Dutch Development Minister Jan Pronk. The organization was established as a charitable society based in Berlin. In May 1993, Eigen secured funding from the GTZ and the German Development Foundation, Deutsche Stiftung für Internationale Entwicklung (DSE) to publicly launch TI at the Villa Borsig, the official Guest House of the German Government in Berlin-Tegel. Leaders from Africa, Asia, Latin America, and the German development community participated in the launch. Transparency International's mission is to address corruption in all its forms through engagement with civil society, business, and government, a strategy Eigen describes as 'the magic triangle'.

United Nations Secretary-General Kofi Annan reportedly referred to the 10th (anti-corruption) Principle of the UN Global Compact as 'the Peter Principle' in a 2004 speech.

=== Leadership with other initiatives ===
By the late 1990s, Eigen believed the World Bank had the political will and resources to support anti-corruption efforts, but lacked direct mechanisms to finance and empower civil society organizations globally. Along with other Transparency International board members, including Frank Vogl, Barry Metzger, and Pierre Landell-Mills, Eigen conceptualized the Partnership for Transparency Fund (PTF) as an independent organization to address this gap. The PTF was formally registered under New York State law in December 2000, with Eigen serving as its first board chair. The PTF was established as a charitable entity, with the goals of providing small grants and technical assistance to civil society organizations working to promote good governance and hold governments accountable.

In 2007, Eigen initiated the launch of the Berlin Civil Society Centre (now the International Civil Society Centre), a think tank supporting global civil society organizations. He partnered with Burkhard Gnärig, former CEO of International Save the Children Alliance (London), to establish and lead the centre. Gnärig served as the centre's managing director until 2018, working pro bono in the early years.

Eigen was one of the initiators and served as the first chair of the Extractive Industries Transparency Initiative (EITI). The initiative was formally launched following the conclusion of the "Publish What You Pay" campaign in June 2003, when representatives from governments, industries, and civil society groups convened in the United Kingdom to endorse a common set of "EITI Principles." Under Eigen's leadership, the group convened five times between 2005 and 2006, publishing the EITI Validation Guide and creating the framework for the initiative's governance.

In 2022, Peter Eigen founded the Local Electricity Access Programme (LEAP Transparency), a Senegalese-led initiative aimed at increasing energy access in rural communities.

== Awards ==
- First Class of the Order of Merit of the Federal Republic of Germany (Bundesverdienstkreuz 1. Klasse), 2001.
- European of the Year, Reader's Digest Prize, 2004.
- Gustav Heinemann Award, 2007.
- Inamori Ethics Prize, 2015.
- Deutscher Kulturpreis (German Culture Prize), 2019.
- Persönlichkeit des Jahres (Personality of the Year), German-Brazilian Chamber of Commerce, 2019.

== Personal life ==
In 1963, Peter Eigen married Jutta Philippi, a physician and musician, with whom he had three children. Jutta died in 2002.

== Publications ==
- Eigen, P. (2008). The Web of Corruption – How a Global Movement Fights Graft / Adapted from the original *Das Netz der Korruption*, Frankfurt/Main, Campus Verlag, 2003. ISBN 3-593-37188-X.
- Eigen, P. (2003). Das Netz der Korruption / Campus Verlag, Frankfurt/Main, New York. / Language: German.
