= Victoria Ibezim-Ohaeri =

Nigerian Lawyer and Human Rights Advocate

- Citizenship: Nigeria
- Education: University of Uyo (LLB) Harvard University (LLM)
- Occupations: Lawyer, Human Rights Advocate
- Organization: Spaces for Change (S4C)

Victoria Ibezim-Ohaeri is a Nigerian lawyer, human rights advocate and the executive director of Spaces for Change (S4C) a civil society organization focused on civic space, gender inclusion and energy policy in Nigeria. She is a 2013 SXSW honoree and a 2016 Desmond Tutu Leadership Fellow.

== Education ==
Victoria earned an LLB (Bachelor of Laws) from the University of Uyo, Akwa Ibom. She has a post-graduate diploma in International Development from the Graduate Institute of International and Development Studies, Geneva and completed her LLM (Master of Laws) at Harvard University.

== Career ==
She founded Spaces for Change (S4C) and acts as its Director of Research and Policy. S4C has collaborated with the International Institute for Sustainable Development's Global Subsidies Initiative on multi-country research into gender and fossil fuel subsidy reform.

She contributes articles, commentary and public interest analysis to Nigerian media platforms including Premium Times and have been featured in policy and academic outlets such as Verfassungsblog, Just Security, Radical Housing Journal as well as a feature in The Christian Science Monitor.

Victoria is a public speaker, her talks have included, commentary on the 2021 End SARS Memorial protest, TEDx appearances, lectures and panel roles at global convening including the Skoll World Forum.

=== Selected publications and commentary ===
- Energia/IISD Report – Gender and Fossil Fuel Subsidy Reform (Nigeria chapter and Consolidated report).
- Lawanson, Taibat; Ibezim-Ohaeri, Victoria; Akinpelu, Deji; Vilenica, Ana; Lancione, Michele; Thompson, Samantha (2021-05-31). "State interventions, inequalities and people as infrastructure at times of COVID-19 in Lagos, Nigeria" (PDF). Radical Housing Journal. 3 (1): 75–84. doi:10.54825/YXRX9214.
- Just Security – COVID-19 and the Shrinking Civil Space in Nigeria.

== Awards and recognition ==
- 2016 Cohort – Desmond Tutu Leadership Fellowship by the African Leadership Institute.
- 2013 SXSW Honoree
