= International Civil Society Centre =

German civil society organization

- Founded: 2007; 19 years ago Berlin
- Founders: Peter Eigen and Burkhard Gnärig
- Type: Not-for-profit limited liability company
- Headquarters: Berlin, Germany
- Fields: Civil society organisation
- Executive Directors: Kathrin Kirste, Rachel Wilkinson
- Website: www.icscentre.org

The International Civil Society Centre (or the Centre) is a civil society organisation founded in 2007, located in Berlin. The organisation was initially founded under the name of Berlin Civil Society Centre as a not-for-profit company (gGmbH) by Peter Eigen, former chair of the Extractive Industries Transparency Initiative (EITI) and founder of Transparency International. It was co-founded by Burkhard Gnärig, former CEO of Save the Children International, Greenpeace Germany and terre des hommes Germany.

The team is composed of 10 people, with Kathrin Kirste and Rachel Wilkinson as Interim Co-Executive Directors.

== Organisation ==
The International Civil Society Centre's work focuses on leadership support, future trends and sector services. The organisation is owned by 12 associated international civil society organisations, which work across environmental, human rights, social justice and humanitarian issues:

- ADRA International
- CARE International
- CBM International
- ChildFund Alliance
- HelpAge International
- Islamic Relief Worldwide
- Oxfam International
- Plan International
- Sightsavers International
- SOS Children's Villages
- VSO International
- WorldYWCA

The shareholder organisations all hold equal shares in the Centre and are its highest decision-making body. They meet twice a year to elect members to the Centre's Board of Trustees, hear reports on the Centre's work and approve the Centre's budget and audited accounts.

The role of the Centre's board of trustees is to monitor the management of the organisation.

The Centre's work is also supported by international civil society organisations that are its Core Supporters (currently ActionAid International, WaterAid International, Wikimedia Deutschland and World YMCA). These are organisations that pay annual contributions and are involved with the work of the Centre but do not own any shares.

== Programmes ==
The International Civil Society Centre's work focuses on the following aspects: Leadership Support, Futures, Civic Space, and Marginalised Communities.

Its convening role allows for workshops and conferences where civil society practitioners connect, collaborate and co-create. The Futures of Localisation Programme brings together those interested in realising locally led development. Scanning the Horizon is the only collaborative trend scouting and analysis platform in the civil society sector. The Solidarity Action Network works to strengthen resilience of and solidarity among civil society when faced with civic space restrictions. And the Leave No One Behind Partnership is a global initiative using community-driven data to ensure marginalised groups are visible, heard, and included in decision-making.

=== The Leave No One Behind partnership ===
The Leave No One Behind Partnership is one of the International Civil Society Centre's largest initiatives. It is a global platform of more than 100 organisations, active in eight countries, focused on promoting citizen- and community-led development. Using a methodology called "Making Voices Heard and Count", communities collect and use data to engage decision-makers and amplify marginalized voices, in alignment with the 2030 Agenda for Sustainable Development.

=== Futures of Localisation ===
The Futures of Localisation initiative focuses on supporting the operational status of power shift development and promotion of locally led development and localisation in the sector. This programme prepares organisations for the next changes and consequences of larger localisation trends ahead.

In recent years, discussions around power shifts, localisation, and decolonisation in the development and humanitarian sectors have gained increasing attention. More actors are seeking to drive a paradigm shift, aiming to rebalance the historically unequal partnerships that have shaped these sectors. Efforts to transfer decision-making power from international civil society organisations (ICSOs) to the communities they serve has sparked transformative processes. These pave the way for more sustainable solutions that address power and resource imbalances between donors, ICSOs, and local communities.

The International Civil Society Centre is committed to advancing this momentum and supporting international civil society organisations and their partners on the ambitious and vital journey towards a power shift. In 2022, the Centre expanded its thematic work on power shift and governance reform, integrating it into its 2022–2024 strategic cycle. The original Power Shift Lab series has evolved into the Accelerating Inclusive Power Shift project, designed to accelerate change and inspire ICSOs to reimagine their role within the global civil society sector.

Through this project, the Centre contributes to building a global system for, development, human rights, and social justice work that is equitable, inclusive, and locally led.

=== Scanning the Horizon ===
Scanning the Horizon is the only collaborative trend scouting and analysis platform in the civil society sector. Members include leading international civil society organisations, national civil society umbrella organisations, philanthropy and development consultancies. Futurists, strategists, trend analysts and organisational learning and research specialists form a cross-sector community of experts and practitioners share insights, explore key trends and develop relevant strategies. The platform also enables mutual learning and the pooling of resources.

=== The Solidarity Action Network (SANE) ===
The Solidarity Action Network brings together international civil society organisations and their local partners to support each other when faced with undue threats and challenges to their operations or civic space restrictions more broadly. It enhances cooperative mechanisms for joint actions beyond public statements of solidarity to push back against clampdowns on civil society.

The network holds two primary functions:

- Collecting and sharing knowledge, experiences, and best practices to create a ‘Solidarity Playbook’ to help other civil society actors to respond to threats and challenges.
- Enabling exchange of best practices and inspiring collaborative actions – mainly connecting development and humanitarian ICSOs with an operational or a partner presence on the ground and bringing them into discussions on challenges and opportunities related to civic space.
