= Charmian Gooch =

British anti-corruption campaigner (born 1965)

- Born: Charmian Penelope Gooch; 1965 (age 60–61)
- Education: University of Wales
- Occupations: Anti-corruption campaigner and activist
- Years active: 1993–present
- Organization: Global Witness

Charmian Penelope Gooch (born 1965) is a British anti-corruption campaigner and activist. She is a co-founder and board member of the NGO Global Witness, where she works to uncover and fight corruption in the developing world.

Gooch's career spans over 23 years and has focused on a variety of global issues such as revealing suspect oil and mineral deals and investigating business in various corrupt regimes.

Gooch's involvement with Global Witness has earned her and the organisation a variety of awards and nominations.

== Early life ==
Born in 1965, Gooch is a self-confessed "lifelong troublemaker." She grew up in London and was taught by her parents to question authority.

In 1987, Gooch graduated from the University of Wales, Aberystwyth, where she studied history and immediately began to look for a job after graduation. Gooch's first professional position was as a researcher at the Environmental Investigation Agency (EIA), a non-governmental organisation that was based out of London and focused on exposing polluters and poachers. It was a branch of Greenpeace that "conducted undercover investigations into environmental crime."

Investigations regarding black markets dealing with ivory in the Middle East and Hong Kong also helped her learn about corporate structures and how money moves around.

== Global Witness ==
Global Witness is a British non-governmental organisation based out of London, England. With the financial backing of hedge-fund billionaire George Soros, the organisation fulfills a watchdog function, and has led a variety of campaigns and investigations aimed at uncovering a global architecture of conflict and corruption, that some have suggested is "woven into" the business of extracting and exploiting natural resources.

Using extensive knowledge on how businesses and governments inter-operate with each other, Gooch and Global Witness have unveiled various sources of corruption and exploitation and continue to do so.

=== Early years ===
Concerns over the funding of covert warfare through illegal trade had increased at the time.

Gooch co-founded Global Witness in 1993 with Taylor and Alley to expose the "nexus of corruption, natural resources, and conflict". They created Global Witness due to the "looting of entire countries," which they saw as a human rights issue.

At its inception, Gooch and her co-founders solicited donations at London Underground station entrances due to a lack of funding sources. Eventually, a Dutch charity known as Oxfam Novib provided the trio with enough money to start their first major campaign on the Cambodia-Thailand frontier. This also became a starting point for them to "build their activism on facts they collected themselves in the field."

=== Khmer Rouge timber trade ===
In January and February 1995, Gooch and Global Witness undertook an investigation regarding the illegal trade of timber in both Thailand and Cambodia, which was largely responsible for funding the civil war in Cambodia. Posing as timber buyers, Gooch and her team visited logging camps to study how a Cambodian communist insurgency known as the Khmer Rouge was "collaborating with Thai interests to cut down hardwood forests in violation of a United Nations ban."

The evidence Gooch and Global Witness managed to obtain was compiled into a report called Forest, Famine, and War – The Key to Cambodia's Future, which was published in March 1995. The international pressure that followed as a result of the report forced Cambodia to introduce a timber export ban in May 1995 that significantly reduced Thai trading with the Khmer Rouge and effectively closed the Cambodian border to further Thai timber imports.

The Khmer Rouge and their leader were deprived of an annual revenue close to $90 million. In the 13 months that followed, the Khmer Rouge located near the Cambodia-Thailand border eventually defected to the government, as Global Witness had effectively "cut off their income."

=== Blood Diamond trade ===
In the late 1990s, the sale of diamonds to fund wars in countries such as Angola, Liberia, the Democratic Republic of Congo, and Sierra Leone had resulted in the death and displacement of millions of people.

In 1997, Gooch travelled to Angola to investigate how militants were mining diamonds to prolong a civil war that had started in the 1970s. She shoved a would-be-mugger down a flight of stairs while gathering information about the diamond supply chain from government officials and businessmen in the Angolan capital of Luanda and in the diamond-trading centre of Antwerp, Belgium, earning her a reputation for toughness.

With her Global Witness co-founders Taylor and Alley, Gooch proceeded to travel to Lisbon to interview members of an Angolan anti-communist group called the National Union for the Total Independence of Angola. Also known as UNITA, Gooch and her colleagues probed into questions regarding mining operations in Angola.

Gooch and Global Witness compiled all of the evidence they had collected into a report. It illustrated how over a six-year period, UNITA was able to purchase arms by generating $3.7 billion from the sale of diamonds. This prompted governments and other entities in the diamond industry to take action to remove "conflict diamonds" from the global marketplace.

Gooch's work with Global Witness in exposing the conflict diamond trade was the inspiration for the 2006 film Blood Diamond. The film highlights some of the key events that Global Witness was a part of, such as the 1998 report and the creation of the Kimberley Process.

=== Anonymous companies ===
In most corruption cases that Global Witness has pursued, Gooch and her colleagues have found one aspect that is very common. They discovered that most perpetrators stored their money in "daisy chains of untraceable shell companies," which are corporate entities that are minuscule in size and located in offshore havens such as the British Virgin Islands. This was creating a financial system that made it simple to "hide and move suspect funds around the world" while impacting "hundreds of millions of people in countries all over the world."

To address this challenge, in 2010 Gooch and Global Witness began work with a coalition of non-governmental organisations committed to forcing companies to identify "their ultimate, or beneficial, owners."

Efforts by Gooch and her allies aimed at encouraging members of the G8 to be more transparent were successful when the US Congress passed a piece of legislation in July 2010 known as the Dodd – Frank Wall Street Reform and Consumer Protection Act, which was designed to decrease various risks in the US financial system.

On 31 October, UK Prime Minister at the time, David Cameron, attended the Open Government Partnership conference in London and took to the stage to announce that he was going to "introduce legislation requiring all companies based in Britain to disclose who their ultimate owners are in a publicly accessible registry."

== Awards and nominations ==
Gooch's work and involvement with Global Witness has resulted in awards and nominations for both her and the organisation.

Gooch and Global Witness's campaign to combat blood diamonds that started in 1997 subsequently led to their nomination for the 2003 Nobel Peace Prize. The award that year was awarded to Iranian human rights activist Shirin Ebadi.

In 2005, Gooch and her Global Witness co-founders Patrick Alley and Simon Taylor received the Gleitsman International Activist Award from the Harvard Kennedy School. The award was created in 1993 by Alan Greitsman to "honor leadership in social activism that has improved the quality of life in countries and inspired others to do the same." Gooch and her colleagues were honorees of the award along with Han Dongfang, international advocate of the worker's movement in China. They received $125,000 and a "specially commissioned sculpture designed by Maya Lin, the creator of the Vietnam War Memorial."

In 2014, Gooch and her Global Witness co-founders Alley and Taylor received the Skoll Award for Social Entrepreneurship from the Skoll Foundation. The award consists of $1.25 million and is given to "transformative leaders who are disrupting the status quo, driving large-scale change, and are poised to make an even greater impact on the world."

She was named in the Bloomberg Markets "50 Most Influential" list alongside other honorees such as Apple CEO Tim Cook, billionaire philanthropist Warren Buffett and Chancellor George Osborne.

She was also named by Fast Company as one of the 100 most creative people in business for "shining a light on corporate secrecy." She came in at number 38.
