= Global Witness =

International non-governmental organisation

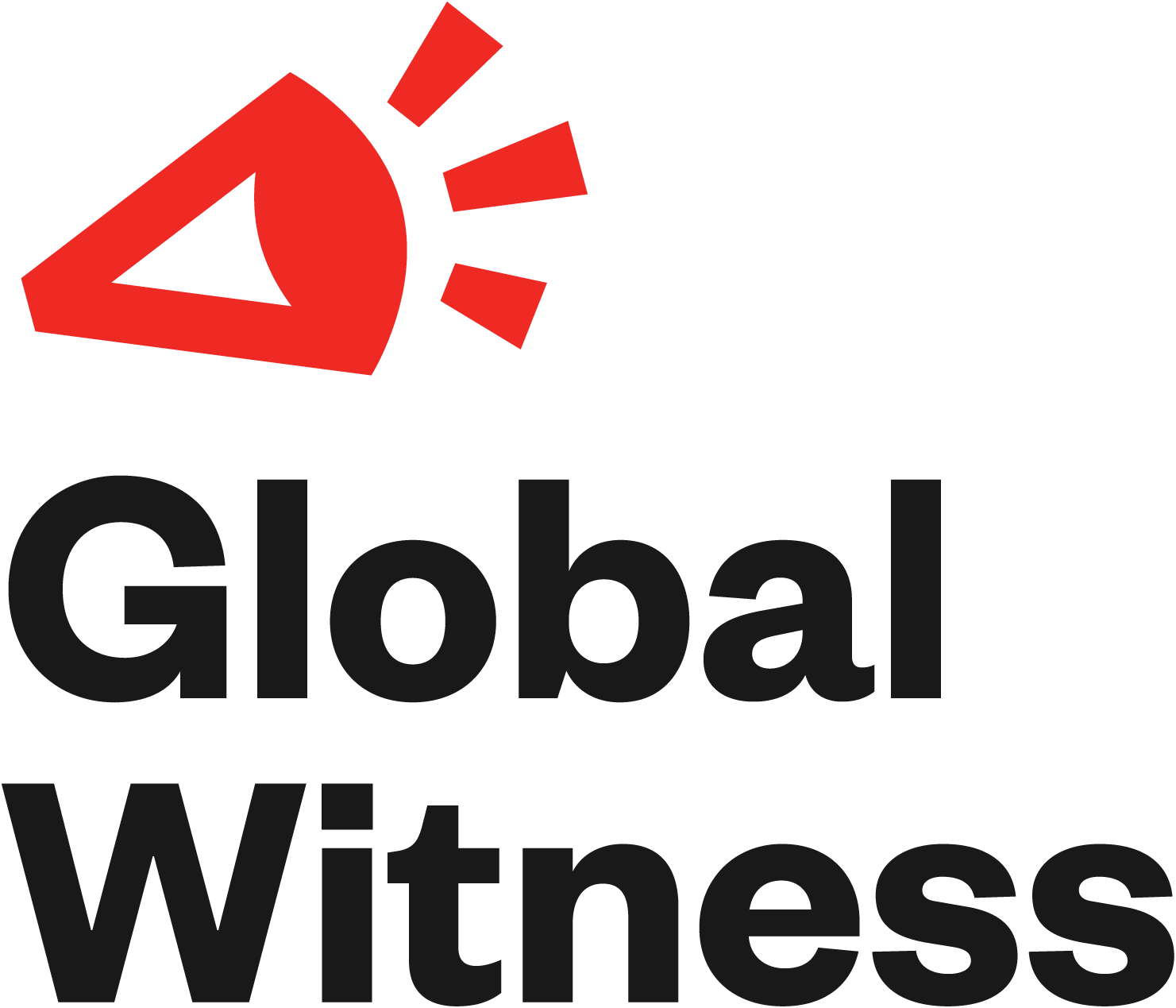
- Founded: 15 November 1993, London
- Founder: Patrick Alley; Charmian Gooch; Simon Taylor
- Type: Non-profit; NGO
- Purpose: Climate change, environmental and human rights abuses.
- Location(s): London, Washington, D.C. and Brussels
- Website: globalwitness.org

Global Witness is an international NGO which investigates environmental and human rights abuses.

The organisation, which has offices in London, Washington, D.C. and Brussels, explores how diamonds and other natural resources can fund conflict or fuel corruption. It carries out investigations into the involvement of specific individuals and business entities in activities such as illegal and unsustainable forest exploitation, and corruption in oil, gas and mining industries, and campaigns for greater representation of people affected by the climate crisis in climate decision-making.

== Projects ==
Global Witness has worked on diamonds, oil, timber, cocoa, gas, gold and other minerals. It has undertaken investigations and case studies in Cambodia, Angola, Liberia, Democratic Republic of the Congo, Equatorial Guinea, Kazakhstan, Burma, Indonesia, Zimbabwe, Turkmenistan and Ivory Coast. It has also helped to set up international initiatives such as the Extractive Industries Transparency Initiative, the Kimberley Process, (Note: Global Witness withdrew from the Kimberley Process in 2011, saying that it is no longer working.) and the Publish What You Pay coalition.

The organisation campaigns to protect human rights defenders targeted because of their work to prevent natural resource exploitation. An investigation by Global Witness in April 2014 revealed there were nearly three times as many environmental defenders killed in 2012 than 10 years previously. Global Witness documented 147 deaths in 2012, compared to 51 in 2002. In Brazil, 448 activists defending natural resources were killed between 2002 and 2013, in Honduras 109, Peru 58, the Philippines 67, and Thailand 16. Many of those facing threats are ordinary people opposing land grabs, mining operations and the industrial timber trade, often forced from their homes and severely threatened by environmental devastation. Others have been killed for protests over hydroelectric dams, pollution and wildlife conservation. By 2019, Global Witness were documenting 212 such deaths in the year.

=== Cambodia ===
Global Witness's first campaign was in Cambodia in the 1990s where the Khmer Rouge was smuggling timber into Thailand. The Observer newspaper attributed the cessation to Global Witness's "detailed and accurate reporting".

After a report implicating relatives of Prime Minister Hun Sen and other senior government officials, the prime minister's brother, Hun Neng, a provincial governor, was quoted in a Cambodian newspaper as saying if anyone from Global Witness returned to Cambodia, he would "hit them until their heads are broken."

=== Conflict diamonds and Sierra Leone ===
As part of its campaign against conflict diamonds, Global Witness helped establish the Kimberley Process Certification Scheme (KCPS). The international governmental certification scheme was set up to stop to trade in blood diamonds, requiring governments to certify that shipments of rough diamonds are conflict-free. Like many other Sub-Saharan African (SSA) countries, Sierra Leone is endowed with oil and mineral resources amid social inequality, high prevalence of poverty, and conflict.

On 19 July 2000, the World Diamond Congress adopted at Antwerp a resolution to reinforce the diamond industry's ability to block sales of conflict diamonds. Thereafter, with growing international pressure from Global Witness and other NGOs, meetings were hosted with diamond-producing countries over three years, concluding in the establishment of an international diamond certification scheme in January 2003. The certification system on the export and import of diamonds, known as the KCPS, was called by the resolution, imposing legislation in all countries to accept shipment of only officially sealed packages of diamonds accompanied by a KP certificate guaranteeing that they were conflict-free. Anyone found trafficking conflict diamonds will be indicted of criminal charges, while bans were to be imposed on individuals found trading those stones from diamond bourses under the World Federation of Diamond Bourses.

=== Conflict minerals ===
Global Witness' report published in 2009, Faced with a gun, what can you do?, highlighted the extent to which trade in minerals from the Democratic Republic of the Congo was fueling the armed contract within the country, drawing on field research conducted that year in North and South Kivu, Rwanda and Burundi, and naming several European and Asian companies whose supply chain operations were in effect funding armed groups.

=== Oil, gas, and mining ===
Global Witness helped establish the Extractive Industries Transparency Initiative (EITI), which was announced by then UK Prime Minister Tony Blair at the World Summit on Sustainable Development in Johannesburg in September 2002 and formally endorsed by the World Bank in December 2003. The EITI is a result of the efforts of the PWYP campaigners. It is now supported by a majority of the world's oil, mining and gas companies and institutional investors, in total worth US$8.3 trillion. Global Witness is a member of the EITI International Advisory Group and sits on the EITI board.

=== Forests ===
On UN efforts to broker a deal on "Reducing emissions from deforestation and forest degradation" (REDD), Global Witness said: "REDD carries considerable risks for forests and local communities and will only succeed if civil society is engaged as an independent watchdog to ensure that the money is used in accordance with national laws and international guidelines."

== Recent ==
=== Anonymous companies ===
Global Witness campaigns against anonymous companies and for registers of beneficial ownership. Anonymous companies are a legal business practice but can be used for purposes such as laundering money from criminal activity, financing terrorism, or evading taxes.

=== Banks ===
Global Witness is on the Coordinating Committee of Taskforce on Financial Integrity and Economic Development, and is a member of BankTrack, and the UNCAC Coalition of Civil Society Organisations. In May 2009, Global Witness employee, Anthea Lawson, testified before the U.S. House Financial Services Committee on "Capital Loss, Corruption and the Role of Western Financial Institutions".

=== Malaysia ===
Global Witness exposed corruption in land deals within the administration of Taib Mahmud, the chief minister of the state of Sarawak in Malaysia through the video titled "Inside Malaysia's Shadow State". The video featured footage of conversations with relatives of Taib and their lawyer where Global Witness agents posed as potential investors.

=== 2020: 227 environmental activists killed worldwide ===
In 2019, Global Witness recorded the murders of 212 environmental activists, making it the worst year since this recording process began, in 2012. This was up from the number of 197 killed in 2018. 2020 saw a further rise in cases, with 227 killed.

== Honors and awards ==
- Winner of the Gleitsman Foundation prize for international activism (2005)
- Winner of the Center for Global Development/Foreign Policy Magazine Commitment to Development Ideas in Action Award (2007)
- Recipient of the Allard Prize for International Integrity (2013 Honourable Mention)
- Winner of the Skoll Award for Social Entrepreneurship 2014
- Co-winner of the Sheila McKechnie Foundation's 2021 David and Goliath Award, for the successful campaign to stop the UK Government's multi-billion financing for fossil fuels overseas. Global Witness campaigner Adam McGibbon coordinated the campaign.

== Income ==
The majority of Global Witness funding comes from grants made by foundations, governments, and charities. One of their main benefactors is the Open Society Institute, which also funds Human Rights Watch. Global Witness also receives money from the Norwegian and British governments, the Adessium Foundation, and Oxfam Novib.

In the UK, Global Witness Trust is a registered charity supporting the work of Global Witness.

== See also ==
- Asset forfeiture
- Group of States Against Corruption
- International Anti-Corruption Academy
- International Anti-Corruption Day
- ISO 37001 Anti-bribery management systems
- OECD Anti-Bribery Convention
- Transparency International
- United Nations Convention against Corruption
