= PowerTech Information Systems =

- Founded: 1993
- Founder: Øystein Homelien, Lars Nøring, Harald Paulsen, and Henrik Dramstad
- Headquarters: Oslo, Norway
- Services: Internet service provider
- Revenue: Approximately $81 million kroner (2009) ($13,794,792 USD, per 2012 currency exchange rates)
- Website: www.powertech.no

PowerTech Information Systems AS is an Oslo-based Norwegian Internet service provider founded in 1993.

== History ==
PowerTech was founded in fall 1993, in tiny quarters in Storgata, Oslo, by teenagers Øystein Homelien, Lars Nøring, Harald Paulsen, and Henry Dramstad. They had dropped out of school and were all still minors; Nøring's father became chairman of the company for legal reasons. In an interview with Aftenposten in 1994, they said "their biggest dream was to give the Internet to the people." (They were also interviewed that year by Alf Tande-Petersen in the program "Opp Med Norge" on NRK.) They initially provided internet service only to individuals, but later changed their focus to small- to mid-sized companies; they now primarily provide commercial broadband and hosting services, mainly to companies in Oslo and Akershus. Initially, the founders drew only minimal salaries from the company, and in 1996/97, the company took out a large loan to replace aging equipment. In 2003, three of the founders were still active with the company, which had annual revenues of approximately 30 million kroner ($5,173,047 USD, per 2012 currency exchange rates), had received outside investment of some four million kroner, and was still 50% owned by the four founders and their families. In 2008, including two subsidiaries, the company had approximately 30 employees; in 2009, revenues were approximately 81 million kroner ($13,794,792 USD, per 2012 currency exchange rates).

PowerTech's original rival was Oslonett, which was started by IT professionals from the University of Oslo and was later acquired by Telenor. Numerous other ISPs appeared in Norway in 1996/97, most of which no longer exist. The company was part owner with Dagbladet of the internet portal Start.no, which is now the Start Network; Scandinavia Online bought PowerTech's share in 2008. Start Bredbånd (broadband) and Whitebird New Media, former subsidiaries, were absorbed into PowerTech on December 1, 2009. The company was sold to Broadnet in February 2016.
