= Civic space =

Metaphorical space containing political discourse

Civic space is created by a set of universally-accepted rules, which allow people to organise, participate and communicate with each other freely and without hindrance, and in doing so, influence the political and social structures around them. It is a concept central to any open and democratic society and means that states have a duty to protect people while respecting and facilitating the fundamental rights to associate, assemble peacefully and express views and opinions.

== History ==
Although the term "civic space" has only been in common usage since after the turn of this millennium, the rights upon which the concept is based have been a necessary feature of every democratic society. Global civil society alliance CIVICUS began using the term regularly after the inception of the Civic Space Initiative in 2011, defining it as "the place, physical, virtual, and legal, where people exercise their rights to freedom of association, expression, and peaceful assembly. By forming associations, by speaking out on issues of public concern, by gathering together in online and offline fora, and by participating in public decision-making, individuals use civic space to solve problems and improve lives. A robust and protected civic space forms the cornerstone of accountable, responsive democratic governance and stable societies." Civic space is also closely connected to the development of post–World War II human rights norms, and particularly the Universal Declaration on Human Rights in 1948 which established clear protections for the rights to freedom of association, peaceful assembly and expression.

As a concept, civic space is also closely related to the evolution of the concept of civil society. While the ideas embodied in civil society can be traced to many different civilisations, the term civil society has many different definitions but has its roots in ancient Greece and the early work of Aristotle on the concepts of "community" or "polity" characterised by a shared set of norms or ethos. (Note: Language here is adapted from the Wikipedia article on civil society) Some theorists interpret civil society very closely to the modern understanding of civic space, taking it to mean "the elements such as freedom of speech, an independent judiciary, etc, that make up a democratic society." Especially in the discussions among thinkers of Eastern and Central Europe, civil society is seen also as a concept of civic values. (Note: Taken directly from the civil society article) Most modern-day definitions of civil society however view it more in terms of "the arena, outside of the family, the state and the market where people associate to advance common interests."

== Protection of rights ==
Core civic space rights – the rights to freedom of association, freedom of peaceful assembly and freedom of expression – are guaranteed by law. States that are signatories of international conventions (such as the United Nations International Covenant on Civil and Political Rights) and other regional treaties containing similar provisions, are obliged to respect and protect these rights. These states are also obligated to protect these rights in domestic law and many of the ratifying States have included protection of these rights in their constitutions as fundamental freedoms. States are obliged not only to respect and promote these rights but also to protect them from infringement by both state and non-state actors. Therefore, a progressive constitution supported by a sound legislative framework that is upheld by a responsive and independent law enforcement machinery is key to enabling and preserving civic space. Notably, Goal 16 of the Sustainable Development Goals framework agreed to by all UN member states promises to 'promote just, peaceful and inclusive societies.’

As a starting point, while there have been a number of international initiatives launched over recent years to defend civic space, civil society actors were lacking a strong common definition of the terms and shape of the civic space to be defended. To fill this gap, an informal meeting of CSOs, which took place in Bangkok in November 2015, asked the International Civil Society Centre to facilitate the development of a Civic Charter. The Civic Charter provides a global framework for people's participation in shaping their societies. The two-page document, which people and organisations can sign on to and use as a basis for joint action, articulates a common set of civic and political rights. Aimed at civil society activists and their organisations, the Civic Charter connects those engaged in the everyday struggle for civic space – on a local, national, regional or international level. Firstly, it draws together the most crucial terms for civic participation in an easily understandable way. Secondly, it serves as a global reference framework to civil society actors for their rights enshrined in international law. Thirdly, it reaffirms people's rights to participate in shaping their societies. The Civic Charter can provide a more effective basis for campaigning and advocacy for civic participation, as well as for promoting international solidarity with CSOs and activists in a specific country or region.

=== Freedom of association ===
The right to freely associate includes the right of every person without distinction of any kind, such as race, colour, sex, language, religion, political or other opinion, national or social origin, property, birth, sexual orientation or other status, to “establish a civil society organisation and also to freely join one or choosing not to participate. Individuals may operate civil society organisations and participate in their activities without fear or unwarranted interference. Freedom of association also encompasses the right to establish branches, recruit staff, raise funds freely, to fair taxation levels and to affiliate and cooperate with other organisations locally, nationally or internationally.” It also includes the right to form and join trade unions for the protection of his interests.

International law protects the freedom of association and obligates states not to interfere with this right and only in instances where intervention by the state is necessary in the interests of national security, public safety or public order; the protection of public health or morals; or the protection of the rights and freedoms of others. Like the freedom of expression, the margin for restricting this right is very limited. State actions must lean in favour of permitting civil society activities and creating an enabling environment for civil society to function and thrive.

=== Freedom of expression ===
The right to freedom of expression entails, according to the Universal Declaration of Human Rights, the "freedom to hold opinions without interference and to seek, receive and impart information and ideas through any media and regardless of frontiers."

The right is fundamental to the existence of civil society. It includes "the right to access information, critically evaluate and speak out against the policies and actions of state and non-state actors, as well as publicly draw attention to and carry out advocacy actions to promote shared concerns, without fear of retribution from any quarter. Civil society organisations are also assured the freedom to carry out investigations and document their findings under this right."

According to international law (for example see Article 20 of the ICCPR), freedom of expression can only be restricted in certain limited circumstances, provided by law and where it is necessary to protect the rights and reputations of others and to safeguard national security, public order, public health and morals.

=== Freedom of assembly ===
The right to freely assemble "assures civil society the freedom to exercise legitimate dissent through peaceful forms of protest as well as organise meetings and hold demonstrations to forward matters of common interest." International law places the same limitations on the restriction of this right as in the case of freedom of association. Moreover, international standards limit the use of force by the authorities in managing public assemblies.

=== Violations ===
At the international level, civic space violations are regularly documented and reported by international human rights organisations like CIVICUS, Human Rights Watch, Amnesty International, the International Centre for Not-for-profit Law (ICNL), Article 19, Reporters Without Borders, Frontline Defenders, the International Service for Human Rights, the International Federation for Human Rights (FIDH) and others. At the regional, national and sub-national levels there are innumerable human rights organisations, development organisations, think tanks and academic institutions devoted to researching and campaigning on civic space issues.

Violations of civic space take many forms and can be perpetrated by the state - either directly through officials, police officers or security personnel, or at arm's length through agents or third parties - or non-state actors including criminal gangs, terrorist organisations, private corporations, political parties, religious organisations and civil society groups themselves.

==== Non-exhaustive list of examples of civic space violations ====
States can violate freedom of association by establishing restrictive laws that restrict people's ability to freely form and operate groups to advance their interests or even prevent them for doing so. For example, in some countries, legislation banned organisations that work in certain topics like human rights to form legally. Moreover, these restrictive laws place broad oversight powers in the hands of government institutions with which civil society organisations must register and to whom they must account or report regularly. In some cases those governmental oversight bodies have a discretionary power to suspend or terminate an organisation's registration. In the most extreme cases, penalties for noncompliance with NGO laws can include fines and imprisonment. In more recent years, and with a spike in concern about international terrorism, more and more states have begun to pass anti-terrorism laws which negatively impact upon civic space, and particularly the ability of organisations to operate free from state interference. States can restrict freedom of association by targeting members of the organisations, human rights defenders and activists using intimidation tactics, harassment, travel bans, detention, among others.

Curtailing the ability to protest can be done within the legislative framework, when the norms in place unduly restricted the right to assembly by imposing prior authorisation requirements, time and place restrictions, among others. In practice, this right can be restricted when security forces use excessive force to disperse protesters, arbitrary arrest them and even charge protesters with provisions of the criminal code and even anti terrorism legislation.

Targeting free speech can take various forms. As the media plays a crucial role in disseminating information, States often overregulated media in order to limit, control or prevent critical and dissenting voices to express. In some cases, the pluralistic views are also undermined by media concentration in just a few private corporations. Criminalisation of dissent by using defamation provisions is also commonly used to restrict freedom of expression. Acts of violence against journalists and media workers for reason related to their professional work often occurs and limits the right to freedom of expression and access to information as it also prevents the public from accessing that information.

The internet is a unique tool that allows individuals to communicate instantly, with a positive impact on the way we currently share and access information. For that reason, it is particularly targeted by authorities to curtail dissent. Some governments restrict the dissemination of content on certain sensitive issues by blocking access to social media platforms, deleting certain pages or content and even arresting people for disseminating sensitive information.

== See also ==
- Civil society
- Freedom of assembly
- Freedom of association
- Freedom of expression
- Liberty
