= Extractive Industries Transparency Initiative =

Organization of countries

- Abbreviation: EITI
- Formation: 17 June 2003
- Purpose: Financial transparency and improved governance in the extractive industry
- Headquarters: Oslo, Norway
- Products: EITI Standard
- Members: 57 countries
- Official language: English, French, Russian
- Chair of the Board: Helen Clark
- Executive Director of the International Secretariat: Mark Robinson
- Website: www.eiti.org

The Extractive Industries Transparency Initiative (EITI) is a Norwegian-based organization that seeks to establish a global standard for the governance of oil, gas and mineral resources. It seeks to address key governance issues in the extractive sectors.

The EITI Standard requires information along the extractive industry value chain from the point of extraction, to how the revenue makes its way through the government and its contribution to the economy. This includes how licenses and contracts are allocated and registered, who the beneficial owners of those operations are, what the fiscal and legal arrangements are, how much is produced, how much is paid, where the revenue is allocated, and its contributions to the economy, including employment.

The EITI Standard is implemented in 55 countries around the world. Each of these countries is required to publish an annual EITI Report to disclose information on: contracts and licenses, production, revenue collection, revenue allocation, and social and economic spending.

Every country goes through a quality-assurance mechanism, called Validation, at least every three years. Validation serves to assess a country’s compliance with the EITI Standard and promote dialogue and learning at the country level. It also safeguards the integrity of the EITI by holding all EITI implementing countries to the same global standard.

Each implementing country has its own national secretariat and multi-stakeholder group made up of representatives from the country's government, extractive companies and civil society. The multi-stakeholder group makes decisions on how the EITI process is carried out in the country.

The EITI Standard is developed and overseen by an international multi-stakeholder Board, consisting of representatives from governments, extractives companies, civil society organisations, financial institutions and international organisations.

The current Chair of the EITI Board is Helen Clark, Former Prime Minister of New Zealand and former UNDP Administrator. The previous chairs have been Fredrik Reinfeldt, former Prime Minister of Sweden, Clare Short (2011-2016), former UK Secretary of State for International Development and Peter Eigen (2009-2011). The EITI International Secretariat is located in Oslo, Norway and is headed by Mark Robinson.

== History ==
The Extractive Industries Transparency Initiative (EITI) was first launched in September 2002 by the then UK Prime Minister, Tony Blair during the World Summit on Sustainable Development in Johannesburg, following years of academic debate, as well as lobbying by civil societies and companies, on the management of government revenues from the extractive industries. In particular, the EITI was established to be an answer to public discussions on the "Resource Curse" or the "Paradox of Plenty". NGOs such as Global Witness and "Publish What You Pay", as well as companies such as BP pushed the UK government to working towards an international transparency norm.

The organisation was founded at a conference in London in 2003. The 140 delegates from government, companies and civil society agreed on twelve principles to increase transparency over payments and revenues in the extractive sector. A pilot phase of the EITI was launched in Nigeria, Azerbaijan, Ghana and the Kyrgyz Republic. The management of the Initiative continued to lay with the UK Department for International Development.

The second EITI Conference on 17 March 2005 in London established six criteria based on the principles. These set out the minimum requirements for transparency in the management of resources in the oil, gas and mining sectors, laying the foundation for a rule-based organisation. This conference also established an international advisory group (IAG) under the Chairmanship of Peter Eigen to further guide the work of how the EITI is to be set up and function. More countries, companies and civil-society organisations joined the initiative. The International Monetary Fund and the World Bank endorsed the EITI.

The report issued in June 2006 by the international advisory group recommended the establishment of a multi-stakeholder board and an independent secretariat, and these were set in place at the third EITI conference held in Oslo, Norway on 11 October 2006. Oslo was chosen as the new location for the secretariat.

In the following years the body further fleshed out the criteria, turning them into a set of 23 requirements, known as the EITI Rules in 2011.

The EITI Standard replaced the EITI Rules on 24 May 2013. The Standard was revised in February 2016.

== Structure and funding ==
The EITI is organised as a non-profit association under Norwegian law. It has three institutional bodies: The Members' Meeting, the EITI Board, and the International Secretariat. The Members' Meeting governs the EITI and convenes alongside the EITI global conferences, which are held every two to three years.

The board develops the Standard and assesses the progress of the countries. It is supported by the international secretariat, located in Oslo, Norway.

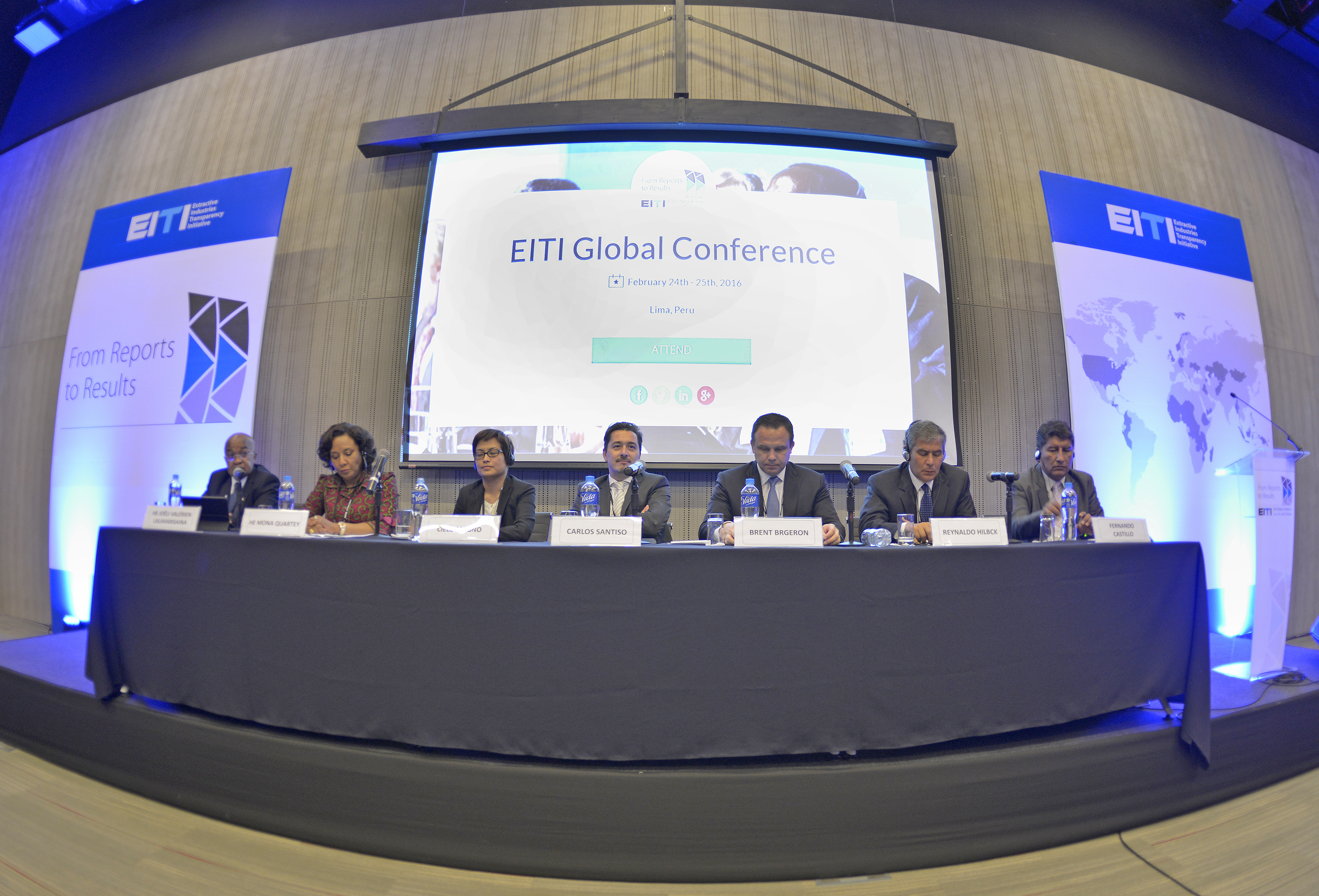
EITI Global Conference, February 2016

The EITI Board meets between two and four times a year and is composed of three groups: countries, companies and civil society. The membership of the Board reflects the multi-stakeholder nature of the EITI. The EITI Board has eight committees (audit, finance, governance and oversight, implementation, nominations, outreach and candidature, rapid response and Validation) to develop recommendations to the full board.

The funding of the EITI is two-fold. At the country level, implementation is funded by the governments. At the international level, the EITI is funded by implementing countries, supporting governments and companies.

== Member countries ==
Any country with extractive industry sectors can adhere to the EITI Standard. Countries implementing the transparency standard include OECD states such as Norway, the United Kingdom and the United States as well as countries in Africa, Central and East Asia, Europe, and Latin America and the Caribbean.

When a country intends to join the EITI Standard, it is required to undertake five sign-up steps before applying.

These steps relate to a clear commitment of the government, company and civil society engagement, the establishment of a multi-stakeholder group and agreement on a work plan, which sets out what the country wants to achieve within a certain time frame.

Once the application of the country has been accepted by the board, the country is called an "EITI candidate". The candidate receives the deadlines for publishing information and undergoes "Validation" two and a half years later.

The result of Validation is a measure of how well the country is progressing to meet the requirements of the standard. It can make satisfactory, meaningful, inadequate or no progress. The EITI board will ask the country to improve aspects which Validation deemed insufficient to fulfill the standard. An overview of Validation results is available online.

When a candidate country passes EITI Validation, it is declared "EITI compliant" by the Board.

As of September 2022, 57 countries are implementing the EITI:

- Afghanistan
- Albania
- Angola
- Argentina
- Burkina Faso
- Cameroon
- Central African Republic (suspended)
- Chad
- Colombia
- Côte d'Ivoire
- Democratic Republic of the Congo
- Dominican Republic
- Ecuador
- Ethiopia
- Gabon
- Germany
- Ghana
- Guatemala
- Guinea
- Guyana
- Honduras
- Indonesia
- Iraq
- Kazakhstan
- Kyrgyz Republic
- Liberia
- Madagascar
- Malawi
- Mali
- Mauritania
- Mexico
- Mongolia
- Myanmar
- Mozambique
- Myanmar
- Netherlands
- Niger
- Nigeria
- Norway
- Papua New Guinea
- Peru
- Philippines
- Republic of the Congo
- Sao Tome and Principe
- Senegal
- Seychelles
- Sierra Leone
- Suriname
- Tajikistan
- Tanzania
- Timor-Leste
- Togo
- Trinidad and Tobago
- Uganda
- Ukraine
- United Kingdom
- Zambia

Other countries, such as Lebanon, France and Australia have shown interest in implementing the EITI.

== Impact of the EITI ==
The EITI has made significant contributions to improved governance of the extractive sector in several countries around the world. In countries like the Democratic Republic of the Congo, the EITI has been central to many reforms of the sector. At the international level, debates on transparency in the sector are unrecognisable from ten years ago, and the EITI is seen as being at the forefront of many frontier debates including beneficial ownership, commodity trading, and artisanal and small-scale mining.

It is also clear that the EITI process is one of the only functioning global mechanisms to inform and channel debate in resource-rich countries in a way that includes all stakeholders. In Peru, EITI Reports have highlighted that, only about 15% of revenues from the mining and hydrocarbon sector has been used for developmental spending, such as infrastructure or economic diversification. The rest has been spent on current expenditures such as salaries and servicing debts. Local citizens are using this information to engage with their regional authorities on alternative ways to spend these resources.

EITI Reports make recommendations aimed at addressing weaknesses in government systems and improving extractive sector management. In Nigeria, President Buhari has initiated major reforms in the oil sector, starting with restructuring the national oil company, a review of oil contracts, an pause in the awarding of the notorious oil swap deals, and a review of subsidy arrangements. These were all recommendations from Nigeria EITI Reports.

Furthermore, the EITI can lead to higher attractiveness for investments. There is "mounting evidence that information release supports greater competition around government contracting and that being an EITI signatory leads to greater inflows of both aid and foreign direct investment". A 2025 research study has found that EITI membership significantly increases foreign direct investment (FDI) by roughly 50%.

== Supporting companies ==
As of January 2021, 68 oil, gas and mining companies, financial institutions and commodity traders support the EITI. Supporting companies publicly endorse the EITI and contribute to covering the cost of the international secretariat of the EITI.

Extractive companies are involved on the national level in countries implementing the transparency standard. They are part of the stakeholders and are required to hand over numbers on payments as part of the reporting process under the EITI standard. Company advocacy has resulted in several countries beginning EITI implementation.

== Criticism ==
Campaigning organisations have criticised the organisation for the lack of sanction possibilities. On the other hand, business representatives have commented that the EITI board is captured by civil society organisations. The EITI has been seen as insufficient to bring full transparency to payments in the extractive industries, since it does not cover countries active in commodity trading. This has since been addressed by new requirements of the EITI standard.

The body's credibility was questioned after it permitted an Ethiopian application for membership in 2014.

EITI has also been criticised for ignoring the violations of human rights in Azerbaijan, and for not reacting sufficiently strongly to the harassment of Azerbaijani civil society groups that are part of EITI's multi-stakeholder approach. On the other hand, the EITI has been criticised by an international lending institution for shifting its mandate beyond the promotion of transparency.

The EITI has been criticised in the EU debates on country by country reporting because governments (as opposed to corporations) need to publish the payments. These governments can erode the EITI rules because they can decide autonomously on the threshold size of payments and company operations that do not need to be published.
