= Start Network =

Start Network AS is a private company that owns and runs the internet service provider Start.no in Norway.

In addition to the premium portal site at start.no the company offers several levels of service, including free Internet access over dialup, free internet- and POP3 based email, free web hosting for homepages. During 2005, the company started selling high bit rate home Internet access via asymmetric digital subscriber line (ADSL) to Norwegian customers.

Member-based websites share the common authentication system, Start Pass. It is a Norwegian equivalent to the Microsoft Passport. By February 2006, it had 1.7 million registered users. Norway has 4.6 million citizens.

The Company derives its revenues primarily from the internet access business, from the sale of advertising and from various types of electronic commerce. The two major shareholders are DB Medialab and PowerTech Information Systems.
