= British Overseas NGOs for Development =

British Overseas NGOs for Development (commonly called Bond) is a United Kingdom membership body for non-governmental organisations (NGOs) working in international development. Bond is a registered charity under English law. Campaigns coordinated by Bond include #ProudOfAid. In 2021, as part of wider cuts to the UK aid budget, the funding for Bond from the FCDO was halved.

== See also ==
- National Council for Voluntary Organisations
