= Publish What You Pay =

Organization

- Abbreviation: PWYP
- Formation: 2002
- Type: NGO
- Purpose: Financial transparency in the extractive industry
- Headquarters: London, United Kingdom
- Region served: Global
- Executive Director: Elisa Peter
- Affiliations: Open Society Foundations, Global Witness, CAFOD, Oxfam GB, Oxfam Novib, Save the Children UK, Transparency International UK, Catholic Relief Services, Human Rights Watch, Partnership Africa Canada, Pax Christi Netherlands and Secours catholique/Caritas France, a number of groups from developing countries.
- Website: https://pwyp.org

Publish What You Pay (PWYP) is a group of civil society organizations that advocates for financial transparency in the extractive industry. Publish What You Pay is a registered charity in England and Wales (Registered Charity Number 1170959), and operates globally.

The group wants companies to declare the amount of money being paid to governments for the rights to extract oil, gas, and other natural resources.

In 2009 a report about PWYP's origins and progress between 2002 and 2007 was released. Entitled Publishing What We Learned, it was authored by Mabel van Oranje, formerly of the Open Society Institute, and Henry Parham, former International Coordinator of PWYP. It is freely available in English, French and Russian.

In 2016, PWYP published a report together with CIVICUS about the backlash that natural resource activists face. The report was authored by Asmara Klein, of PWYP, and Inés M. Pousadela, of CIVICUS.
