= ShelterBox =

British disaster relief charity

- Founded: 2000
- Type: Humanitarian aid charity
- Purpose: Disaster relief
- Location: Cornwall, UK
- Origins: Cornwall, UK
- Region served: Worldwide
- Key people: Tom Henderson. OBE (founder and former CEO), Alison Wallace (former CEO), Chris Warham (former CEO), Caroline White (former Interim CEO), Sanj Srikanthan (current CEO)
- Website: https://www.shelterbox.org

ShelterBox is an international disaster relief charity established in 2000 in Helston, Cornwall, UK, that provides emergency shelter and other aid items to families around the world who have lost their homes to disaster or conflict.

ShelterBox responds to natural disasters such as earthquakes, tropical cyclones, tsunamis, floods and volcanic eruptions. The charity also provides emergency aid to families who have been displaced by war or conflict, in places such as Syria and the Lake Chad Basin.

Typical ShelterBox aid items include tents as temporary shelter or shelter kits to allow people to build or rebuild durable shelters. ShelterBox also provides other aid items such as mosquito nets, water filters, water carriers, solar lights, cooking sets, blankets and mats. A sturdy green box packed with the necessary aid items is often provided to families in places where ShelterBox responds.

The aid provided by ShelterBox is tailored to the nature of each individual disaster and location and therefore it is not always the same. ShelterBox Response Teams distribute aid on the ground, working closely with local organisations, local and international aid agencies and Rotary Clubs worldwide.

== History ==
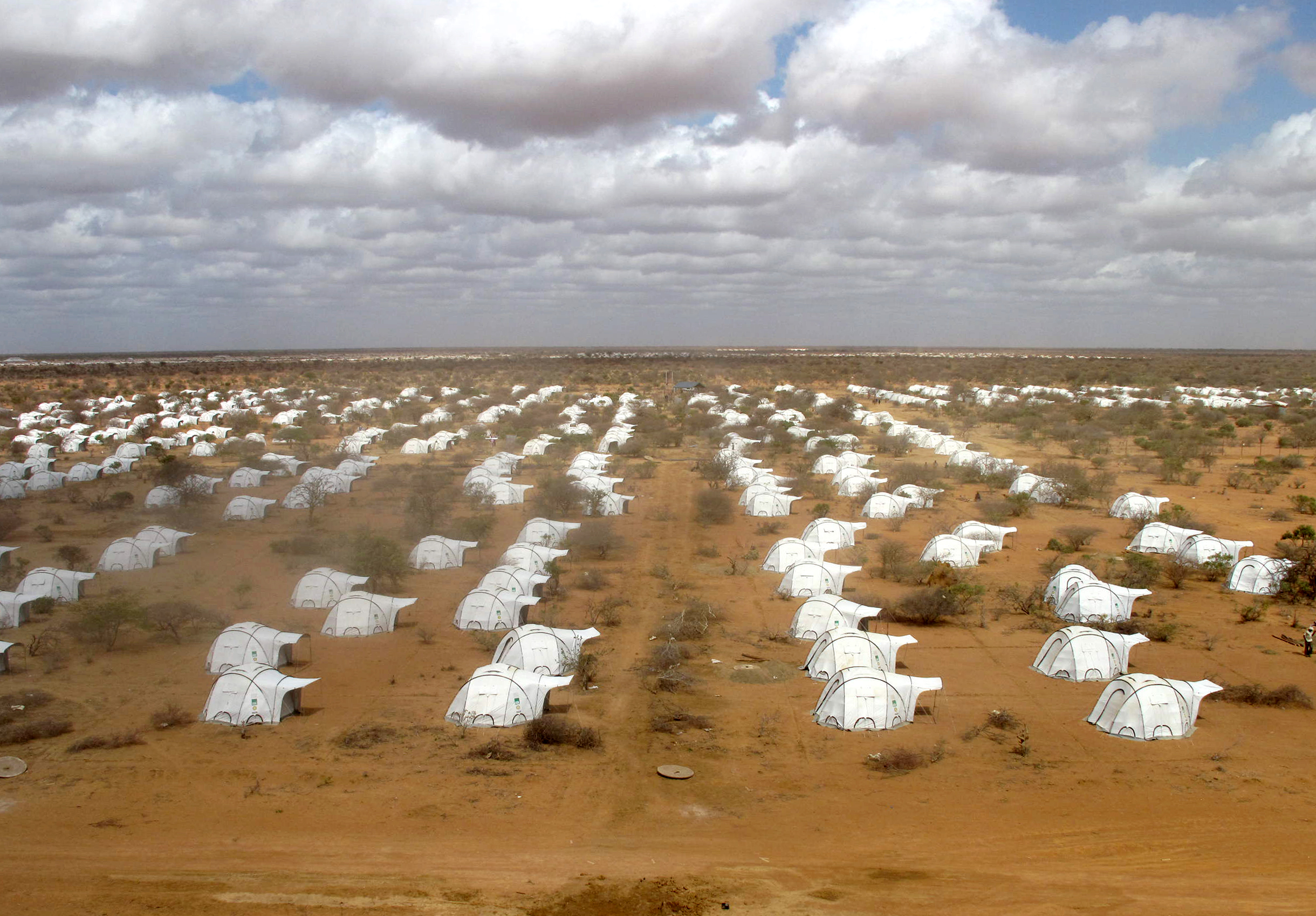
ShelterBox deployed to Kenya following drought and famine across the Horn of Africa in early 2011.

=== Early years ===
ShelterBox was founded in 2000 in the town of Helston, Cornwall, UK by Rotarian and former Royal Navy Search and Rescue Diver Tom Henderson, OBE, who conceived the idea of "a disaster relief kit for a family, contained in a box for fast and easy global deployment" after watching a disaster relief broadcast on television that highlighted the difficulties that disaster relief efforts frequently encounter. That same year the Rotary Club of Helston-Lizard adopted it as its Millennium Project.

The first distribution of 143 ShelterBoxes was sent to victims of the 2001 Gujarat earthquake. Over the next three years the project matured and by the end of 2004 nearly 2,600 boxes had been dispatched, following 16 major disasters. The charity significantly expanded its work in response to the 2004 Indian Ocean earthquake and tsunami. Tom Henderson was recognized as CNN Hero in 2008, the network's annual award that honours the everyday citizens from around the globe who are changing the world. In March 2010 he was made an OBE by The Queen at Buckingham Palace for his outstanding contribution to charity and humanitarian work since he founded ShelterBox in 2000.

In August 2012, the Board of Directors of ShelterBox removed founder Tom Henderson as CEO, stating it was a unanimous decision. In February 2013, Alison Wallace was appointed CEO of ShelterBox after her position as director of international fundraising at Amnesty International.

In August 2014 ShelterBox founder and former CEO Tom Henderson was charged with conspiracy to commit fraud. In the subsequent Old Bailey court case it was alleged that he gave supply contracts to his son. He was cleared of conspiracy to commit fraud: not guilty verdicts were accepted and the Crown Prosecution Service said it would not request a retrial following a 44-day trial, which ended with the jury failing to reach a verdict after more than 30 hours of deliberation.

=== Notable responses ===
One of ShelterBox's largest responses was the 7.0 magnitude earthquake in Haiti in 2010. ShelterBox provided shelter for 28,000 families, or approximately 25% of all tents delivered in areas surrounding Port-au-Prince.

After the 2011 Tōhoku earthquake and tsunami in Japan, ShelterBox provided assistance to about 1,600 families in the disaster region.

In 2015 the charity responded in Nepal providing aid to families who lost their home, after a powerful earthquake left 9,000 dead and nearly 22,000 injured.

In 2017 ShelterBox responded to category 5 hurricanes Irma and Maria in the Caribbean. Aid was provided in the islands of St Kitts and Nevis, the Dominican Republic, Dominica, Antigua and Barbuda, and the British Virgin Islands.

In terms of conflict-related responses, Syria remains one of ShelterBox's largest projects. Since 2013, the charity has been providing emergency aid to families affected by the war in Syria.

=== Evolution of the charity ===
During the early years of the charity's life, Helston was the main location where the headquarters and the main warehouse were located. The aid was pre-packed inside the green ShelterBoxes by volunteers at the warehouse and then shipped to disaster zones. Since then, the charity has grown and evolved a great deal. An office in Truro now houses the main HQ and the charity has another smaller office in London.

In 2017, ShelterBox set up ShelterBox Operations Philippines, a locally registered NGO that is supported and guided by ShelterBox Operations HQ in the UK. ShelterBox has responded in the Philippines more frequently than any other country, and the new NGO set up in the Philippines provides a quicker and more efficient way for the charity to respond in the country.

== Responding to disasters ==
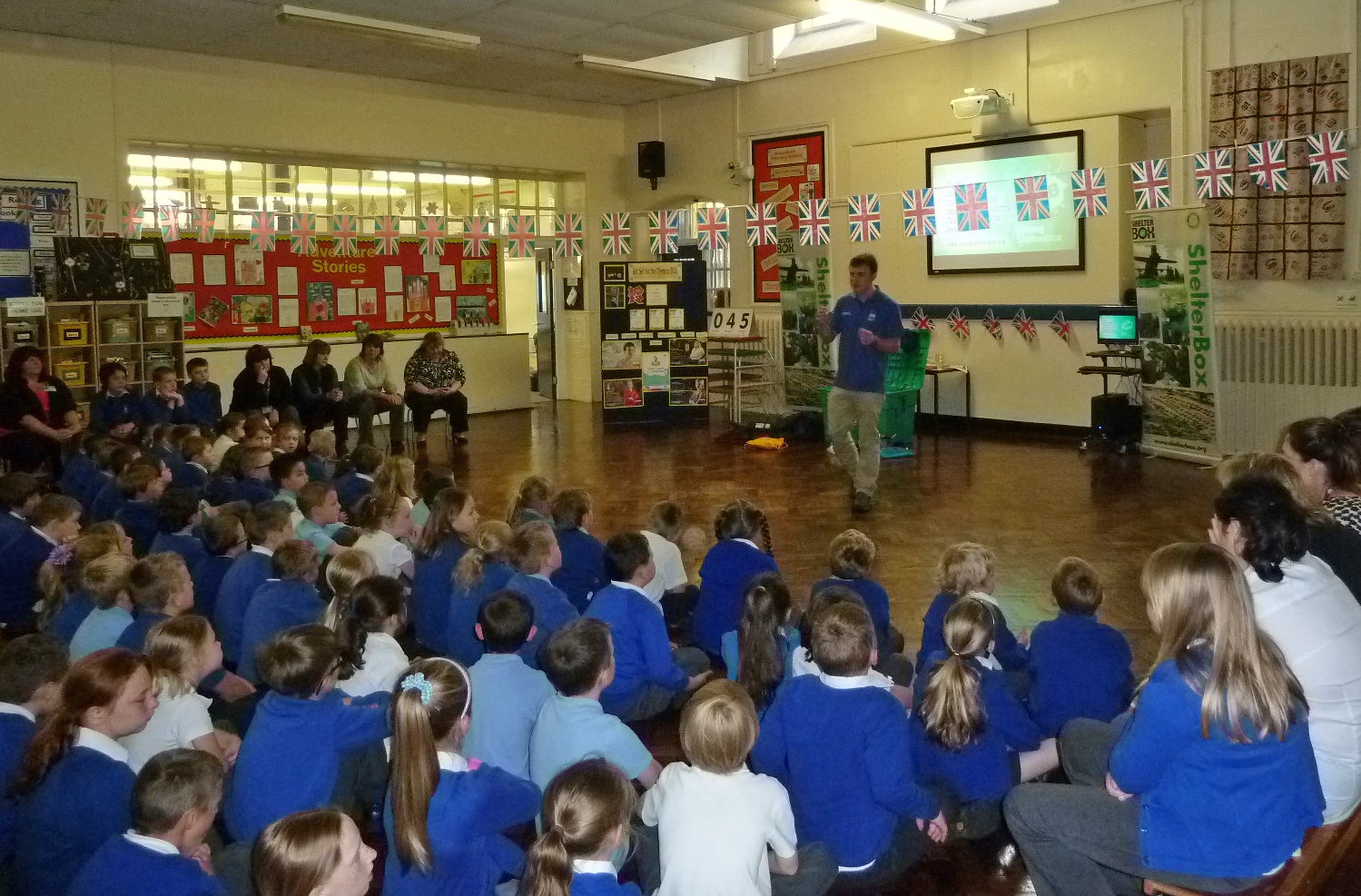
Mike Perham talks about ShelterBox in a UK Primary School as part of Big ShelterBox Week 2012

ShelterBox uses tracking systems to monitor weather systems around the globe and anticipate the likely scale of hurricanes and cyclones. In addition, an earthquake alert system gives immediate notice of any seismic activity that could result in a humanitarian disaster. ShelterBox works with local and international aid agencies and Rotary Clubs worldwide who also relay information when they become aware of an urgent need for shelter.

With a limit to resources, the charity has developed a framework set of questions to help make decisions on where to respond, ensuring the most vulnerable families are supported. Where these response criteria are met, and visa and security conditions permit, a team could be deployed within 48 hours.

== ShelterBox Response Team ==
Shelterbox's Response Team (SRTs) consists of operations staff and volunteers based around the world. SRTs are highly trained emergency shelter specialists and where Shelterbox's "Response Criteria" have been met, will deploy after disaster to assess, coordinate and distribute aid.

== Funding ==
ShelterBox relies on donations: About half of the funds come direct from the UK public, the rest is raised by international affiliates.

== Patrons ==
In August 2007, the then-Duchess of Cornwall became the ShelterBox's president and Royal Patron, following her first introduction to the charity in the previous year.

She first met workers for the charity during a visit to the earthquake-hit villages of Pakistan in November 2006, and was so impressed by the charity's innovative disaster relief work that she has supported it ever since.

== Partnerships and collaboration ==
=== Rotary International ===
In 2000, the Rotary club of Helston-Lizard adopted ShelterBox as its millennium project. It has since become one of the world's leading humanitarian aid charities providing emergency shelter and supplies to thousands of families worldwide following disaster.

Rotary International renewed their three-year Project Partner agreement with ShelterBox in 2019 which increases their joint capacity to help families around the world displaced by disaster.

ShelterBox has been Rotary's Project Partner in Disaster Relief since 2012, but the relationship had been long-standing, going back to the birth of the charity. What began as a local connection with one Cornish Rotary Club has led to an international movement that has raised over £54 million for ShelterBox to date. The partnership extends far beyond financial support. Around 1,000 Rotary members are involved in ShelterBox as volunteers, staff or response team members. Rotary clubs worldwide offer practical assistance to help ShelterBox reach more families after disaster or conflict.

=== International affiliates ===
ShelterBox affiliates are teams set up in different parts of the world. They work with ShelterBox to provide support in fundraising, volunteering and many more. Some of the largest ShelterBox affiliates are located in the US, Canada and Australia, but the international network of affiliates expands to more than 15 countries worldwide.

=== In-country humanitarian partners ===
ShelterBox works with partners all around the world to deliver aid in disaster or conflict zones.
