= Customs Intelligence and Investigation Directorate =

Intelligence agencies in Bangladesh

Customs Intelligence and Investigation Directorate কাস্টমস গোয়েন্দা ও তদন্ত অধিদপ্তর
- Common name: CIID

Agency overview
- Formed: 1972; 54 years ago
- Employees: 9,036 personnel

Jurisdictional structure
- National agency: Bangladesh
- Operations jurisdiction: Bangladesh
- Governing body: Government of Bangladesh

Operational structure
- Headquarters: 8 No. Sarika Tower, Segun Bagicha, Dhaka, Bangladesh
- Agency executive: Syed Mushfequr Rahman, Director General
- Parent agency: National Board of Revenue
- Commands: Bangladesh Customs

Website
- ci.gov.bd

Customs Intelligence and Investigation Directorate (Bengali: কাস্টমস গোয়েন্দা ও তদন্ত অধিদপ্তর) is a specialized intelligence agency of the government of Bangladesh under the National Board of Revenue responsible for investigating tax evasion and customs fraud. Syed Mushfequr Rahman is the Director General of the Customs Intelligence and Investigation Directorate. VAT Audit, Intelligence and Investigation Directorate and Central Intelligence Cell are the sister agencies of the directorate.

== History ==
In 2004, the Minister of Finance, M. Safiur Rahman, announced the formation of a separate intelligence agency for Value Added Tax, called VAT Audit, Intelligence and Investigation Directorate, which had in up to that point overseen by Customs Intelligence and Investigation Directorate. It seized foreign currency from Zia International Airport. The Deputy British High Commissioner in Mumbai asked the directorate to investigate Bangladeshi companies smuggling Heroin into the United Kingdom in July 2005. It seized Indian Sarees imported without paying taxes. Its investigation found evidence of tax evasion by companies through under invoicing at Chittagong Port.

Customs Intelligence and Investigation Directorate seized 6700 cellphone sets and 82 gold bars from Dhaka and Chittagong on 18 November 2015. The new headquarters of the directorate was inaugurated at the building of Institution of Diploma Engineers, Bangladesh.

In 2016, Customs Intelligence and Investigation Directorate seized a car, Mitsubishi Shogun, that was imported under Carnet de Passag but violated its rules from Chittagong. According to the directorate, 300 cars were imported using Carnet de Passag but only half were taken out of the country while the rest remained violating the rules of agreement. The Customs Intelligence and Investigation Directorate seized a drone and a taser from the Shah Amanat International Airport.

Moinul Khan, Director General of Customs Intelligence and Investigation Directorate, in a press briefing accused Apan Jewellers of smuggling gold to evade custom duty on 23 May 2017. It filed five cases against Apan Jewellers and its owners Azad Ahmed, Dildar Ahmed, and Gulzar Ahmed. It seized a Mercedes Benz owned by Dildar Ahmed from Sylhet. The directorate also asked the managing director of Raintree Hotel, Shah Mohammad Adnan Harun, to appear before it after it had found illegal alcohol and evidence of tax fraud following a raid at the hotel. It seized the car of Moosa Bin Shamsher for dodging tax during import. He was later summoned by the directorate. It seized salt (sodium chloride) that had been imported falsely declared sodium sulphate. On 15 October 2017, the directorate seized 12 gold bars and arrested two including an employee of Biman Bangladesh Airlines. World Bank surrendered two cars to Customs Intelligence and Investigation Directorate after it sought information on 16 cars the organization imported. The World Bank handed over another car a few days later. It identified a ring that imported consumer goods made in China as capital machinery to evade taxes. It seized two illegal guns from Hazrat Shahjalal International Airport.

Customs Intelligence and Investigation Directorate sued Mastex Industries Limited for 1.2 billion taka for abusing its bonded warehouse facility. Customs Intelligence and Investigation Directorate seized a Land Rover Defender and a Toyota Harrier for tax evasion in July 2018. Custom Intelligence and Investigation Directorate seized 136 gold bars from Shah Amanat International Airport in August 2018. It also seized four gold bar and ornaments from Hazrat Shahjalal International Airport.

On 30 January 2019, Customs Intelligence and Investigation Directorate arrested MA Kader, chairperson of Crescent Group. Shakera Khatun, an inspector of the Customs Intelligence and Investigation Directorate, produced MA Kader in court seeking remand in an embezzlement case, in which he is accused of embezzling money from Janata Bank through fraudulent paperwork. Following raids on illegal casinos in Dhaka ordered an investigation on the import of casino equipment which violated Public-Gambling Act-1867. It detained an it expert who hacked into the server of National Board of Revenue to release products without inspections from the port. The directorate questioned 14 importers after an abnormal hike in the price of onions in the market.

In February 2021, the Customs Intelligence and Investigation Directorate seized 60 gold bars and arrested eight employees of US-Bangla Airlines from Hazrat Shahjalal International Airport. In October 2021, the directorate seized 120 gold bars from Hazrat Shahjalal International Airport.

Customs Intelligence and Investigation Directorate seized a Rolls-Royce that had been imported in Bangladesh without proper declaration and paying taxes by the Z&Z Intimates Limited, a subsidiary of Ananta Group, in 2022. It fined the company 560 million taka for the Rolls-Royce. It seized 107 tones of clothes imported under a fake declaration.
