= SK Sur Chowdhury =

SK Sur Chowdhury, born Sitangshu Kumar Chowdhury, is a former deputy governor of Bangladesh Bank. He is the former banking reform adviser of Bangladesh Bank.

== Career ==
Chowdhury joined Bangladesh Bank, the central bank of Bangladesh, as an assistant director in May 1981.

In 2007, Chowdhury was the general manager of Bangladesh Bank Chittagong.

In 2012 Chowdhury was appointed deputy governor of Bangladesh Bank. He led a panel that examined launching sovereign bonds in the international financial market. He approved six news banks in 2013, NRBC Bank, Union Bank, South Bangla Agriculture and Commerce Bank, Midland Bank PLC., Meghna Bank, and NRB Bank. In 2015, he refused to provide permission to traditional banks to engage in Islamic finance. He completed his term in 2018 and was appointed reform advisor of Bangladesh Bank.

Two associates of P. K. Halder had claimed Chowdhury aided them in their scam which Chowdhury denied. Bangladesh Financial Intelligence Unit investigated his accounts. Central Intelligence Cell found Chowdhury and his wife had evaded taxes after investigating them. Following the cell's recommendation, in 2021, the National Board of Revenue ordered all banks accounts of Chowdhury and wife to be frozen. He and executive director of the Bangladesh Bank Shah Alam were alleged to be involved in 25 billion BDT scam involving International Leasing and Financial Services Limited. Shah Alam was removed from Bangladesh Bank. In March 2021, Bangladesh High Court questioned why Chowdhury and Shah Alam had not been arrested. Individual Depositors’ Forum of International Leasing also demanded their arrest.

Following the fall of the Sheikh Hasina led Awami League government, the Anti-Corruption Commission asked banks to submit details on his bank accounts. The Commission filed a case against Chowdhury, his wife, and daughter for not submitting their wealth statement in time in October 2024. In January 2025, he was arrested from Segunbagicha and sent to jail by Dhaka Metropolitan Senior Special Judge Md Zakir Hossain.

== Personal life ==
Chowdhury is married to Suparna Sur Chowdhury. They have a daughter, Nandita Sur Chowdhury.
