= Seamark Group =

Food processing company based in England

- Company type: Privately held company
- Industry: Food processing
- Founded: 1976; 50 years ago
- Founder: Iqbal Ahmed; Bilal Ahmed; Kamal Ahmed
- Headquarters: Hulme Hall Lane, Lord Lord North Street, Manchester, England, M40 8AD
- Number of locations: 4
- Key people: Iqbal Ahmed (Chairman and Chief Executive)
- Products: Seafood, poultry, fruit, vegetables
- Brands: Tiger Brand, Lilly, Restaurant Wholesale, Classic, Seagold Brand, Ibco Brand, Mr, Prawn, Sylhet Brand, Vermilion & Cinnabar
- Net income: ▲£ 250 million
- Owner: Iqbal Ahmed; Bilal Ahmed; Kamal Ahmed
- Number of employees: 4,500
- Website: www.seamark.co.uk

Seamark Group is a multinational food processing conglomerate wholesale company with offices in Manchester and Chittagong. The company was founded in 1976 and established in 1991 by Iqbal, Bilal and Kamal Ahmed.

== History ==
Seamark was the first company to introduce black tiger shrimps to Europe in 1976. It was founded by brothers; Iqbal, Bilal and Kamal Ahmed. Seamark plc was established in 1991, specialising in the processing and stocking of warm water shrimps, especially the black tiger and the fresh water king prawn. After processing and packing, these were exported to most countries in Europe.

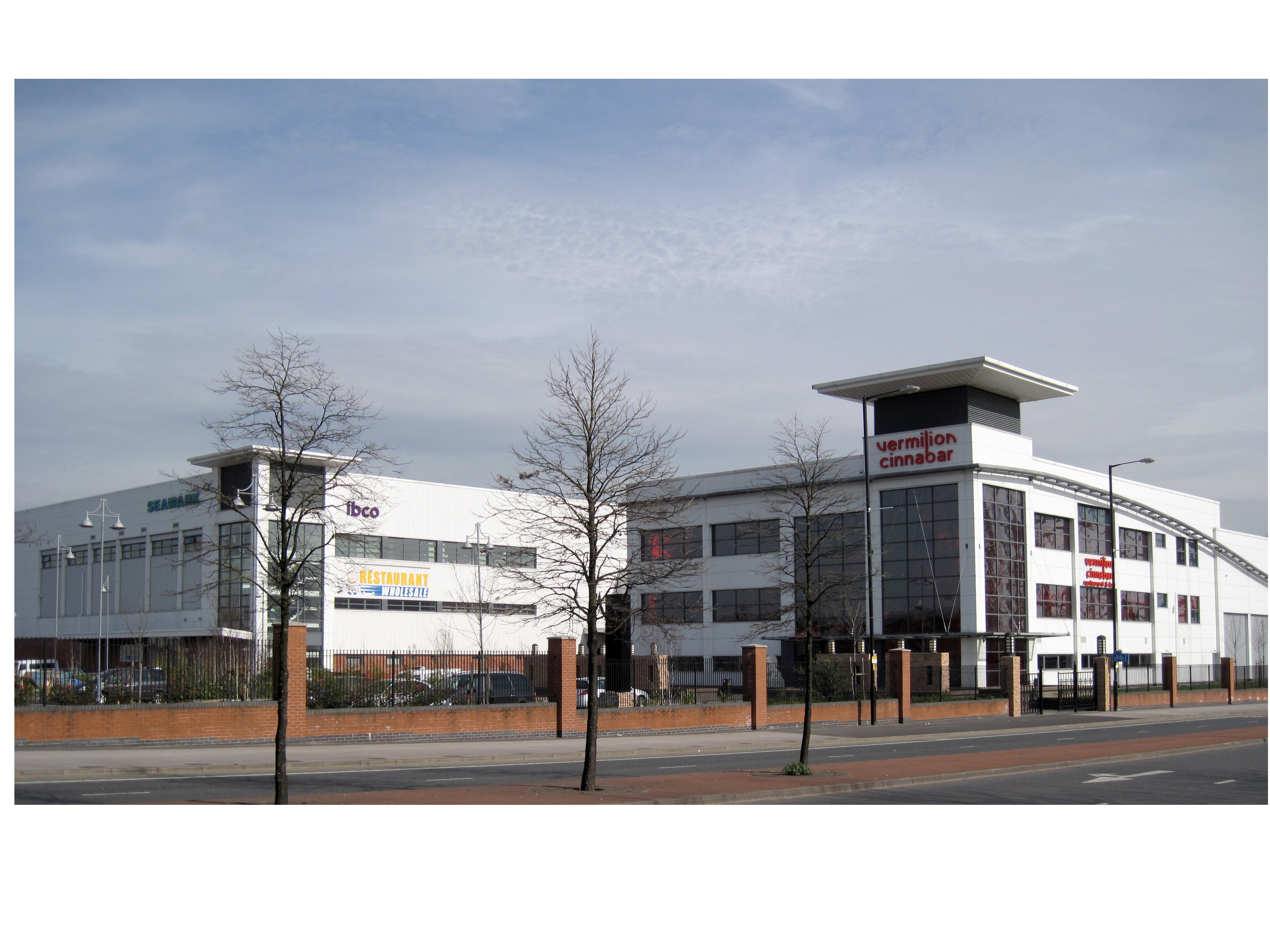
Seamark, IBCO and Vermilion headquarters in Manchester

Since 1992, Seamark has invested more than £30m in infrastructure and production around the world. In November 2000, they opened a £10 million seafood processing plant at the Bangladesh port of Chittagong. In 2006, the company spent £12m on new headquarters on a 6.25- acre site in East Manchester when Seamark offshoot, IBCO Food Industries opened. In November 2007, this site was further developed when a Thai restaurant called Vermilion was opened.

== Manufacturing and products ==
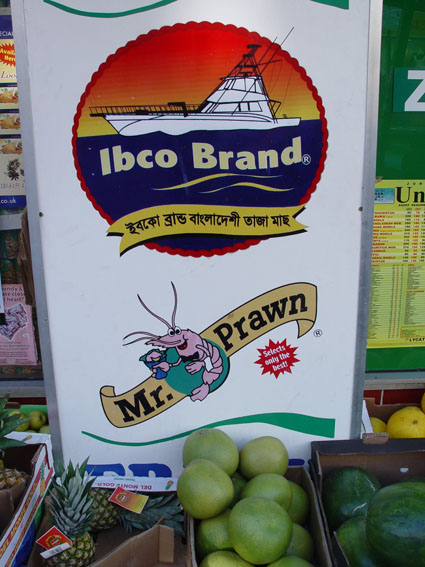
Seamark products sold in Bangladeshi grocery stores

Seamark has more than 1,000 products of seafood, poultry, fruit, vegetables, and finger foods. Its operation in Chittagong, Bangladesh processes products ranging from its traditional shrimps to poultry, dry foods, finger foods, frozen fruit and vegetables, and supplies it to the catering trade.

Its business runs a production facility with its own shrimp processing line and hatchery in Chittagong, a deep-sea fishing fleet in the Bay of Bengal, a purpose-built processing plant and head office in Manchester, and a distribution operation in The Netherlands.

== Operations ==
Seamark is a £161m-plus worldwide operation with an annual turnover of $250m, and a global workforce of 4,500 people, including 300 at its operations in east Manchester. The production facilities in Bangladesh created 1,000 jobs for the local community.

Seamark has a customer base of retailers, wholesalers and distributors throughout the world, with key markets in Germany and the Benelux countries. The Seamark Group of companies has a group turnover of $400m, is the UK's leading importer and processor of shrimps, and has a range of products used by chefs and found in supermarkets across the world.

Its exports account for more than 69% of sales and around 50% of all shrimps exported from Britain come from Seamark's processing operations. The company's international sales have grown by 22% a year, from £32.6m in 2009 to £48.9m in 2011.

== Awards and recognition ==
In 1998, Seamark was awarded the Queen's Awards for Enterprise for International Trade. In July 1999, it was awarded the Barclays Business in Europe export award.

In Bangladesh, the company received a national award and gold medal from the Bangladesh Government consecutively for the years 2001, 2002, and 2003, for the highest export of seafood.

In 2012, Seamark was ranked 191 in The Sunday Times HSBC International Track top 200 performing private companies in the UK. In February 2016, it was awarded the Outstanding Business of the Year award at the British Muslim Awards.

== See also ==
- Business of British Bangladeshis
