= VAT Audit, Intelligence and Investigation Directorate =

Intelligence agencies in Bangladesh

- Abbreviation: VAIID
- Formation: 2004
- Headquarters: Dhaka, Bangladesh
- Official language: Bengali
- Parent organization: National Board of Revenue

VAT Audit, Intelligence and Investigation Directorate (Bengali: ভ্যাট অডিট, গোয়েন্দা ও তদন্ত অধিদপ্তর) is a specialized intelligence agency of the government of Bangladesh under the National Board of Revenue responsible for investigating Value Added Tax fraud. Customs Intelligence and Investigation Directorate and Central Intelligence Cell are the sister agencies of the directorate.

== History ==
In 2004, the Minister of Finance, M. Safiur Rahman, announced the formation of a separate intelligence agency from Customs Intelligence and Investigation Directorate for Value Added Tax, called VAT Audit, Intelligence and Investigation Directorate, which had in up to that point overseen by Customs Intelligence and Investigation Directorate.

The Directorate asked for information from banks before withdrawing the request following pressure from business groups. In October 2020, the Directorate sued Ujala Paints for evading Value Added Tax and Supplementary Duty. It sued add agency Adcomm for VAT evasion. It sued the local partner of Facebook, Httpool Bangladesh, for violating rules. It sued Mr Baker Cake & Pastry Shop for falsifying records and VAT evasion. In February 2021, the Directorate sued Delta Life Insurance Company Limited for 351.8 million BDT in VAT evasion. Insurance Development & Regulatory Authority appointed an administrator for Delta Life Insurance Company. It began preparations to sue Paperfly, a logistics company. The Directorate sued E-orange in August for VAT evasion. The Directorate sued Grameen Bank for VAT evasion of 670 million BDT. It secured 5.2 million BDT from Alesha Mart after completing an audit of the company. In November 2021, VAT Audit, Intelligence and Investigation Directorate fined Danish Foods Limited, a subsidiary of Partex Group for evading 34.6 million BDT in VAT. The Directorate sued Nahid Enterprise for evading 2.75 billion BDT in VAT and called for further investigations by Customs Intelligence and Investigation Directorate and Central Intelligence Cell. It raided fast food chain American Burger. It collected VAT from two subsidiaries of Popular Group.

In May 2022, the Directorate sued Runner Automobiles Limited for VAT evasion of 50 million BDT.
