= Beyazid =

Bayezid (also spelled Beyazıt, Beyazid, Bayazid, Bajazet, Beyazit, Bejazid or Bayazit), an Arabic, Persian, Bengali, Pashto and Turkish name, from the Arabic بايزيد, meaning "a devoted saint", may refer to:

== People ==
- Bayazid Bastami (804–874 or 877/78), Persian Sufi
- Bayezid I (1360–1403), Sultan of the Ottoman Empire from 1389 to 1402
- Shaikh Bayazid Jalayir, prince and governor of Soltaniyeh, Iran from 1382 to 1384
- Shihabuddin Bayazid Shah (1389–1414), Sultan of Bengal from 1413 to 1414
- Bayezid II (1447–1512), Sultan of the Ottoman Empire from 1481 to 1512
- Bayazid Khan Ansari (b. 1525), Pashtun warrior and poet popularly known as Pir Roshan
- Bayazid Khan Karrani (d. 1572), Sultan of Bengal in 1572
- Şehzade Bayezid (1525–1561), son of Sultan Suleiman I of the Ottoman Empire and his wife Hürrem Sultan
- Muhammad Bayazid Khan (1593–1659), Nawab of Malerkotla from 1600 to 1657
- Bayazid Karrani II (died c. 1612), ruler in Sylhet, Bengal
- Muhammad Bayazeed Khan Panni (1925–2012), Bangladeshi homeopath, politician and reformist
- Bayazid Sarker (born 1971), Bangladeshi economic researcher and central banker.

== Places ==
- Bayazid Thana, an area in Chittagong District, Bangladesh
- Bayezid II Mosque (disambiguation)
- Beyazıt Square, a district on the European side of Istanbul
  - Beyazıt Tower
- Doğubeyazıt ("East Beyazıt" in Turkish), a city and district of Ağrı Province, Turkey
- Gavar (Novo-Bayazet/"New Beyazit"), a town in Armenia

== Other uses ==
- Bajazet (play), a 1672 play by Jean Racine
- Bajazet (Gasparini opera), a 1719 opera by Francesco Gasparini
- Bajazet (Vivaldi opera), a 1735 opera by Antonio Vivaldi

== See also ==
- Yazid (disambiguation)
