= Tamburlaine =

1587/88 play by Christopher Marlowe

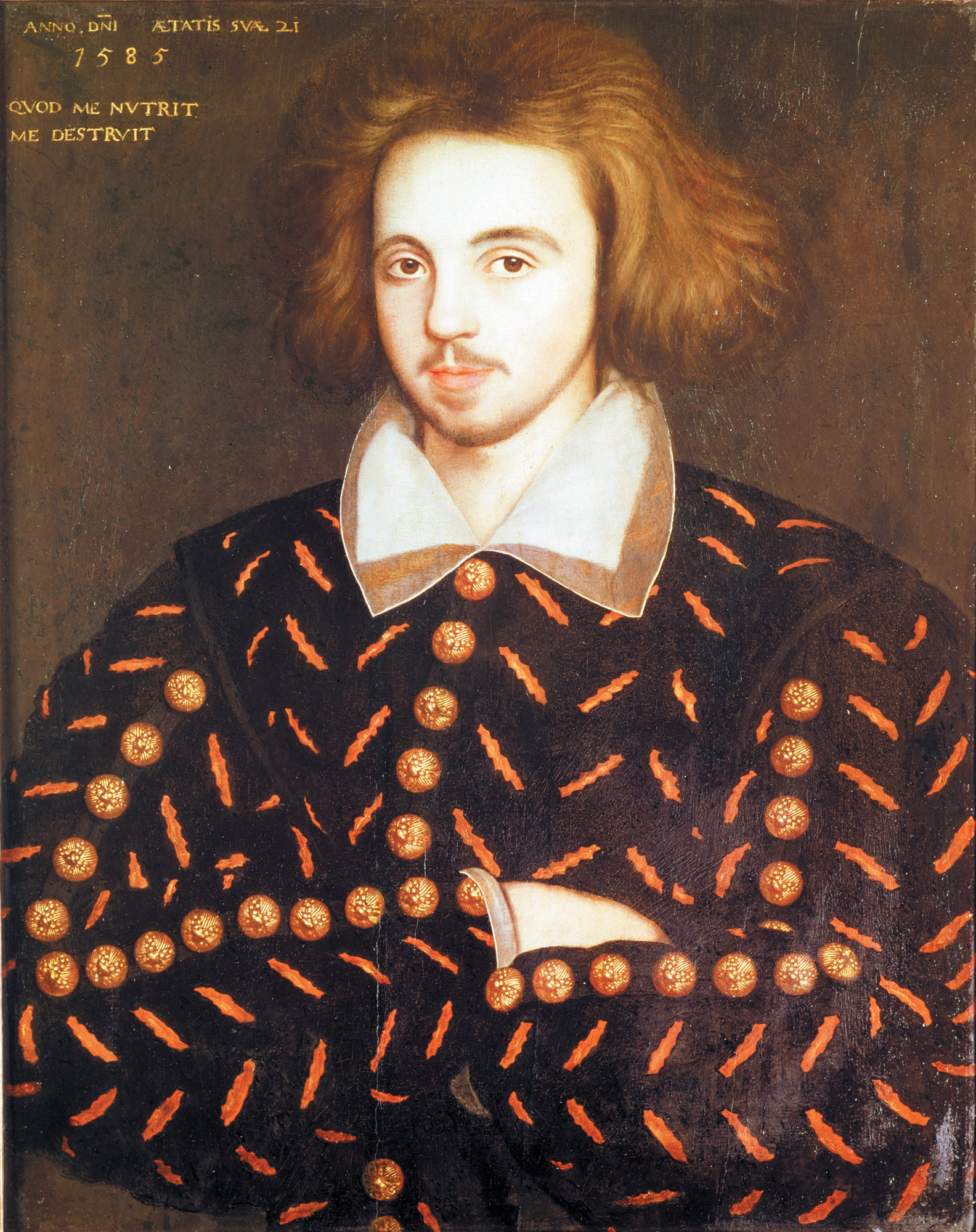
An anonymous portrait, often believed to show Christopher Marlowe. Corpus Christi College, Cambridge.

Tamburlaine the Great is a play in two parts by Christopher Marlowe. It is loosely based on the life of the Turco-Mongol conqueror and emperor Timur (Tamerlane/Timur the Lame, d. 1405). Written in 1587 or 1588, the play is a milestone in Elizabethan public drama; it marks a turning away from the clumsy language and loose plotting of the earlier Tudor dramatists, and a new interest in fresh and vivid language, memorable action, and intellectual complexity. Along with Thomas Kyd's The Spanish Tragedy, it may be considered the first popular success of London's public stage.

Marlowe, generally considered the best of that group of writers known as the University Wits, influenced playwrights well into the Jacobean period, and echoes of the bombast and ambition of Tamburlaine's language can be found in English plays all the way to the Puritan closing of the theatres in 1642. While Tamburlaine is considered inferior to the great tragedies of the late-Elizabethan and early-Jacobean period, its significance in creating a stock of themes and, especially, in demonstrating the potential of blank verse in drama, is still acknowledged.

Whereas the real Timur was of Turkic-Mongolian ancestry and belonged to the nobility, for dramatic purposes Marlowe depicts him as a Scythian shepherd who rises to the rank of emperor.

== Plot ==
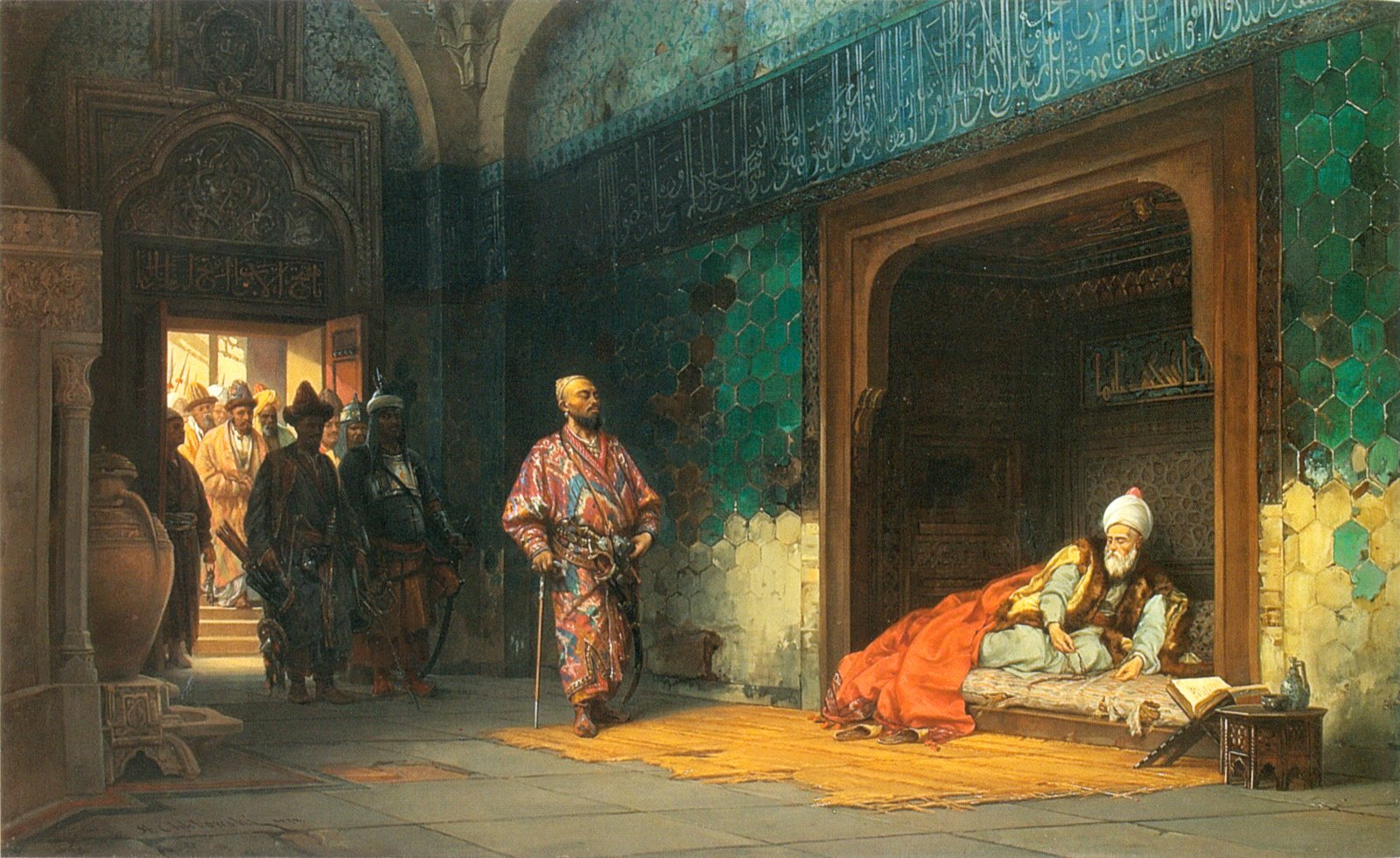
Sultan Bajazeth prisoned by Tamburlaine (1878) by Stanisław Chlebowski

Part 1 opens in Persepolis. The Persian emperor, Mycetes, dispatches troops to dispose of Tamburlaine, a Scythian shepherd and, at that point, a nomadic bandit. In the same scene, Mycetes' brother Cosroe plots to overthrow Mycetes and assume the throne.

The scene shifts to Scythia, where Tamburlaine is shown wooing, and winning, the captured Zenocrate, the daughter of the Egyptian king. Confronted by Mycetes' soldiers, he persuades first the soldiers and then Cosroe to join him in a fight against Mycetes. Although he promises Cosroe the Persian throne, Tamburlaine reneges on this promise and, after defeating Mycetes, takes personal control of the Persian Empire.

Now a powerful figure, Tamburlaine turns his attention to Bajazeth, emperor of the Turks. He defeats Bajazeth and his tributary kings, capturing the emperor and his wife Zabina. The victorious Tamburlaine keeps the defeated ruler in a cage and feeds him scraps from his table, releasing Bajazeth only to use him as a footstool. Bajazeth later kills himself on stage by bashing his head against the bars upon hearing of Tamburlaine's next victory. Upon finding his body, Zabina does likewise.

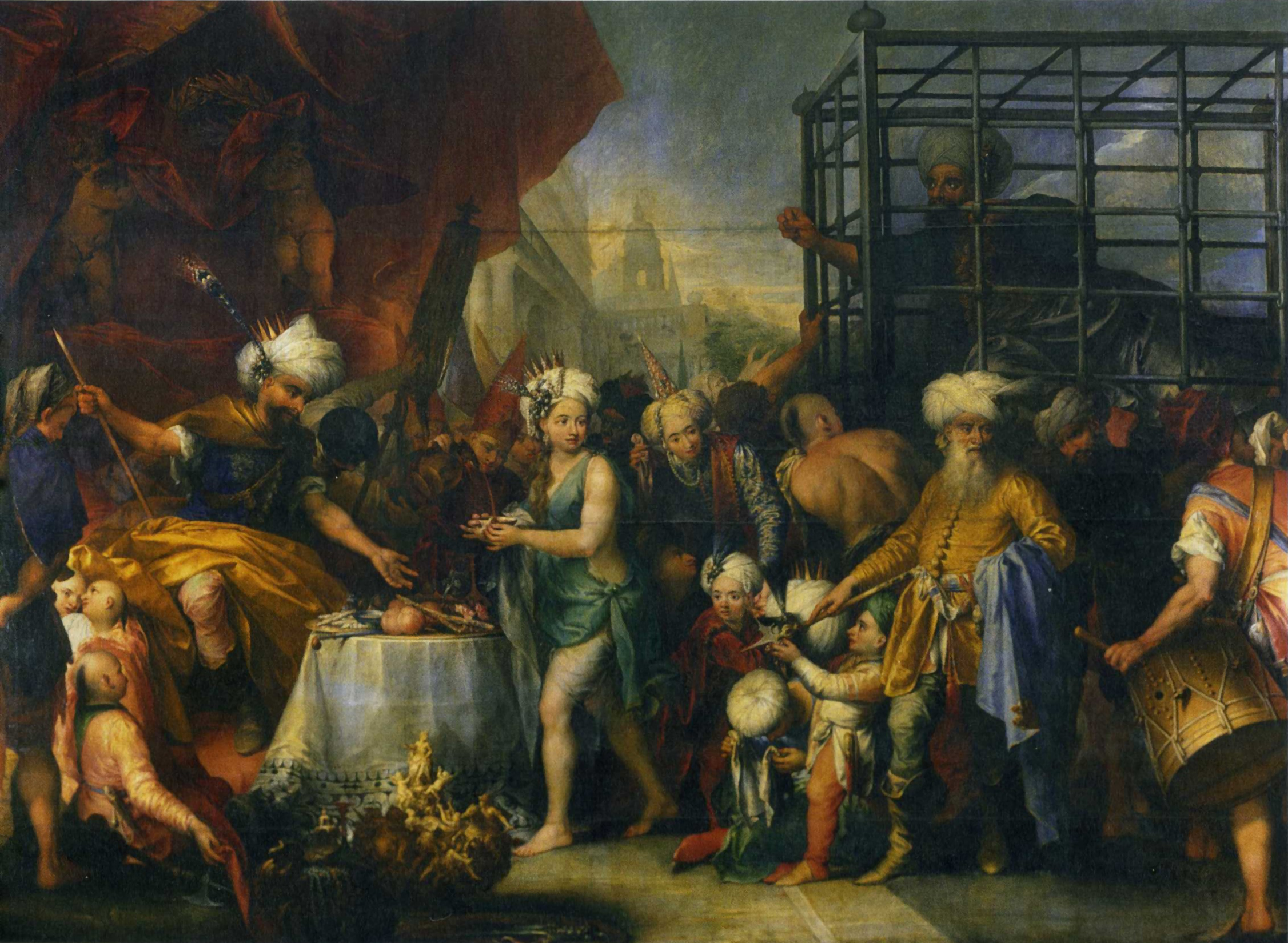
Tamburlaine and Bajazeth (ca. 1700) by Andrea Celesti

After conquering Africa and naming himself emperor of that continent, Tamburlaine sets his eyes on Damascus, a target which places the Egyptian sultan, his to-be father-in-law, directly in his path. Zenocrate pleads with her future husband to spare her father. He complies, instead making the sultan a tributary king. The play ends with the wedding of Tamburlaine and Zenocrate, who is crowned Empress of Persia.

In Part 2, Tamburlaine grooms his sons to be conquerors in his wake as he continues to attack neighbouring kingdoms. His oldest son, Calyphas, preferring to stay by his mother's side and not risk death, incurs Tamburlaine's wrath. Meanwhile, the son of Bajazeth, Callapine, escapes from Tamburlaine's jail and gathers a group of tributary kings to his side, planning to avenge his father. Callapine and Tamburlaine meet in battle, where Tamburlaine is victorious. But finding that Calyphas remained in his tent during the battle, Tamburlaine kills him in anger. Tamburlaine then forces the defeated kings to pull his chariot to his next battlefield, declaring,

Holla ye pampered jades of Asia!
What, can ye draw but twenty miles a day?

Upon reaching Babylon, which holds out against him, Tamburlaine displays further acts of extravagant savagery. When the governor of the city attempts to save his life in return for revealing the city treasury, Tamburlaine has him hanged from the city walls and shot. He orders the inhabitants—men, women, and children—to be bound and thrown into a nearby lake. Lastly, Tamburlaine scornfully burns a copy of the Qur'an and claims to be greater than God. In the final act, he becomes ill but manages to defeat one more foe before he dies. He bids his sons to conquer the remainder of the earth as he departs life.

== Characters ==
In both Parts

- Tamburlaine – in Part 1 a Scythian shepherd; in Part 2 King of Persia
- Techelles – in Part 1 a follower of Tamburlaine; in Part 2 King of Fez
- Usumcasane – in Part 1 a follower of Tamburlaine; in Part 2 King of Morocco
- Theridamas – in Part 1 a Persian lord, later a follower of Tamburlaine; in Part 2 King of Algiers
- Zenocrate – daughter of the Soldan of Egypt; in Part 2 wife of Tamburlaine

Only in Part 1

- Mycetes – King of Persia
- Cosroe – brother of Mycetes
- Ceneus – a Persian lord
- Ortygius – a Persian lord
- Meander – a Persian lord
- Menaphon – a Persian lord
- Bajazeth – Emperor of Turkey
- Zabina – wife of Bajazeth
- Ebea – maid of Zabina
- King of Algier
- King of Fez
- King of Morocco
- Alcidamus – King of Arabia
- Soldan of Egypt
- Governor of Damascus
- Agydas
- Magnetes
- Capolin – an Egyptian
- Anippe – maid of Zenocrate
- Virgin of Damascus 1
- Virgin of Damascus 2

Only in Part 2

- Calyphas – son of Tamburlaine
- Amyras – son of Tamburlaine
- Celebinus – son of Tamburlaine
- Orcanes – King of Natolia
- King of Jerusalem
- King of Soria
- King of Trebizon
- Gazellus – Viceroy of the city of Byron
- Uribassa
- Sigismund – King of Hungary
- Frederick – peer of Hungary
- Baldwin – peer of Hungary
- Callapine – son of Bajazeth
- Alameda – keeper of Callapine
- King of Amasia
- Governor of Babylon
- Captain of Balsera
- Son of the Captain of Balsera
- Olympia – wife of the Captain of Balsera
- Captain
- Maximus
- Peridicas

== Sources ==
Marlowe chiefly based his work on an abridged translation of Pedro Mexía's 1543 Silva de varia lección (A Miscellany of Several Lessons). The translation into English via French, executed by Thomas Fortescue under the title The Forest or Collection of Historyes no lesse profitable than pleasant and necessary, was first published in 1571. Another principal source was Petrus Perondinus's Vita Magni Tamerlinus; Marlowe mostly relied on Mexía for the episodes of the play and Perondinus for characterizing Tamburlaine. Most of the minor characters were invented by Marlowe; the historians he drew on mention few names other than Tamburlaine himself (the historical Timur) and Bajazeth (Ottoman Sultan Bayezid I), though Mexía does mention a "Kyng of Persia and his brother" who were the origin of Marlowe's Cosroe and Mycetes – likely based on the historical personages of the warring Muzaffarid brother kings Shah Mansur and Shah Yahya. Marlowe was apparently aware from his sources of Timur's three sons Umar Shaikh Mirza I, Miran Shah, and Shah Rukh, but not their names; in the play they become Calyphas, Amyras, and Celebinus.

The decision to portray Tamburlaine and the Persians as Hellenistic pagans rather than Muslims in the play was apparently made for dramatic purposes and cannot be attributed to a lack of sources on life in the East. For similar reasons, Marlowe departs from his sources in being far more hostile towards Bajazeth and far more sympathetic towards Tamburlaine. Marlowe largely exhausted his historical sources in writing Part I of the play; Part II therefore relies on more extraneous sources and episodes and lacks some of the cohesion of the preceding part.

== Publication ==
The play (in both parts) was entered into the Stationers' Register on 14 August 1590. Both parts were published together in a single black letter octavo that same year by the printer Richard Jones; its text is usually referred to as O1. A second edition was issued by Jones in 1592, and a third reprint appeared in 1597, essentially reprinting the text of the first edition. The plays were next published separately in quarto by the bookseller Edward White, Part 1 in 1605 and Part 2 in 1606, which reprinted the text of the 1597 printing.

Although Christopher Marlowe was not actually cited as the author in the first printings of the play – no author is named – and the first clear attributions to Marlowe are much later than 1590, scholars attribute the play to Marlowe based on similarities to his other works. Many passages in Tamburlaine foreshadow and echo passages from others of his works, and there is a clear parallel between the character development in Tamburlaine and that of the majority of Marlowe's other characters. This evidence alone leads scholars to believe with virtual unanimity that Marlowe wrote Tamburlaine.

== Critical reception ==
The influence of Tamburlaine on the drama of the 1590s cannot be overstated. The play exemplified, and in some cases created, many of the typical features of high Elizabethan drama: grandiloquent imagery, hyperbolic expression, and strong characters consumed by overwhelming passions. The first recorded comments on the play are negative. A letter written in 1587 relates the story of a child being killed by the accidental discharge of a firearm during a performance, and the next year Robert Greene, in the course of an attack on Marlowe, condemned the "atheistic Tamburlaine" in the epistle to Perimedes the Blacksmith. That most playgoers (and playwrights) responded with enthusiasm is amply demonstrated by the proliferation of Asian tyrants and "aspiring minds" in the drama of the 1590s. Marlowe's influence on many characters in Shakespeare's history plays has been noted by, among others, Algernon Swinburne. Stephen Greenblatt considers it likely that Tamburlaine was among the first London plays that Shakespeare saw, an experience that directly inspired his early work such as the three Henry VI plays.

By the early years of the 17th century, this hyperbolic language had gone out of style. Shakespeare himself puts a speech from Tamburlaine in the mouth of his play-addled soldier Pistol (2 Henry IV II.4.155). In Timber, Ben Jonson condemned "the Tamerlanes and Tamer-chams of the late age, which had nothing in them but the scenical strutting and furious vociferation to warrant them to the ignorant gapers".

Subsequent ages of critics have not reversed the position advanced by Jonson that the language and events in plays such as Tamburlaine are unnatural and ultimately unconvincing. Still, the play was regarded as the text above all others "wherein the whole restless temper of the age finds expression" (Long). Robert Fletcher notes that Marlowe "gained a high degree of flexibility and beauty by avoiding a regularly end-stopped arrangement, by taking pains to secure variety of pause and accent, and by giving his language poetic condensation and suggestiveness" (Fletcher). In his poem on Shakespeare, Jonson mentions "Marlowe's mighty line", a phrase critics have accepted as just, as they have also Jonson's claim that Shakespeare surpassed it. But while Shakespeare is commonly seen to have captured a far greater range of emotions than his contemporary, Marlowe retains a significant place as the first genius of blank verse in English drama.

== Themes ==
The play is often linked to Renaissance humanism which idealises the potential of human beings. Tamburlaine's aspiration to immense power raises profound religious questions as he arrogates for himself a role as the "scourge of God" (an epithet originally applied to Attila the Hun). Some readers have linked this stance with the fact that Marlowe was accused of atheism. Others have been more concerned with an anti-Muslim thread of the play, highlighted in a scene in which the main character burns the Qur'an.

Jeff Dailey notes in his article "Christian Underscoring in Tamburlaine the Great, Part II" that Marlowe's work is a direct successor to the traditional medieval morality plays, and that, whether or not he was an atheist, he had inherited religious elements of content and allegorical methods of presentation.

== Performance history ==
The first part of Tamburlaine was performed by the Admiral's Men late in 1587, around a year after Marlowe's departure from Cambridge University. Edward Alleyn performed the role of Tamburlaine, and it apparently became one of his signature roles. The play's popularity, significant enough to prompt Marlowe to produce the sequel, led to numerous stagings over the next decade.

The stratification of London audiences in the early Jacobean period changed the fortunes of the play. For the sophisticated audiences of private theatres such as Blackfriars and (by the early 1610s) the Globe Theatre, Tamburlaine's "high astounding terms" were a relic of a simpler dramatic age. Satiric playwrights occasionally mimicked Marlowe's style, as John Marston does in the induction to Antonio and Mellida.

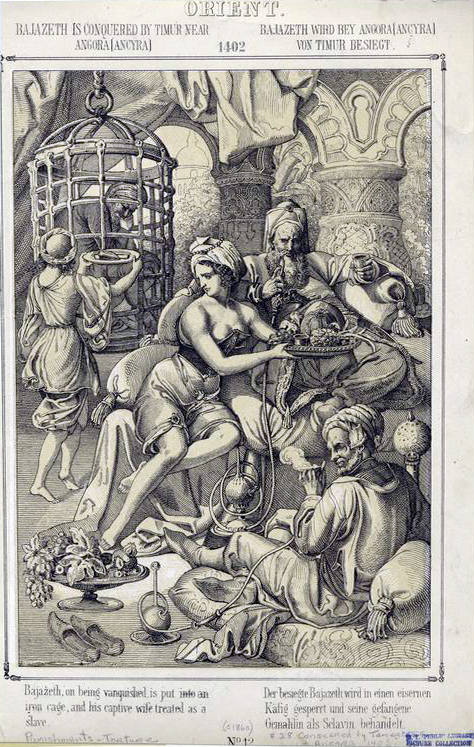
Bajazeth is encaged, while his captive wife is treated as a slave (1860) by Peter Johann Nepomuk Geiger

While it is likely that Tamburlaine was still revived in the large playhouses, such as the Red Bull Theatre, that catered to traditional audiences, there is no surviving record of a Renaissance performance after 1595. Tamburlaine suffered more from the change in fashion than did Marlowe's other plays like Doctor Faustus or The Jew of Malta of which there are allusions to performances. Edward Phillips, in his Theatrum Poetarum (1675), is so unfamiliar with the play that he attributes its writing to Thomas Newton. A further sign of the obscurity this one-time audience favourite had fallen into is offered by playwright Charles Saunders. Having written his own play in 1681 on Tamburlaine, he was accused by critics of having plagiarised Marlowe's work, to which he replied,

I never heard of any Play on the same Subject, untill my own was Acted, neither have I since seen it, though it hath been told me, there is a Cock Pit Play going under the name of the Scythian Shepherd, or Tamberlain the Great, being a thing, not a Bookseller in London, or scarce the Players themselves, who Acted it formerly cou'd call to remembrance.

Following the Glorious Revolution of 1688, a tradition developed in Ireland of performing the play in Dublin on the anniversary of William of Orange's birthday. This was brought to an end in 1713 when the government banned a performance of the play because it included a controversial prologue including the phrase "No Peace Without Spain".

In 1919, the Yale Dramatic Association staged a Tamburlaine which edited and combined both parts of Marlowe's play. A revival of both parts in a condensed form was presented at The Old Vic in September 1951, with Donald Wolfit in the title role. For the Stratford Shakespeare Festival (now the Stratford Festival of Canada) in 1956, Tyrone Guthrie directed another dual version, starring Donald Wolfit, William Shatner, Robert Christie and Louis Negin; it travelled to Broadway, where it failed to impress—Eric Bentley, among others, panned it— although Anthony Quayle, who replaced Wolfit in the title role, received a Tony Award nomination for his performance, as did Guthrie for his direction.

The National Theatre production in 1976 featured Albert Finney in the title role. The production opened the new Olivier Theatre on the South Bank. Peter Hall directed. This production is generally considered the most successful of the rare modern productions. Brian Cox credits a remark from fellow actor Oliver Cotton during the production as resulting in the title of his autobiography Putting The Rabbit in the Hat published in 2021.

In 1993 the Royal Shakespeare Company performed an award-winning production of the play, with Antony Sher as Tamburlaine and Tracy-Ann Oberman as Olympia.

Jeff Dailey directed both parts of the play, uncut, at the American Theatre of Actors in New York City. He presented Part I in 1997 and Part II in 2003, both in the outdoor theatre located in the courtyard of 314 West 54th Street.

Avery Brooks played the lead role in a production of the play for the Shakespeare Theatre Company. The play ran from 28 October 2007 to 6 January 2008 and was directed by Michael Kahn.

A new production combining Parts I and II ("trimming Marlowe’s two five-act plays to three hours of stage time [with a half-hour intermission]") edited and directed by Michael Boyd opened at the Polonsky Shakespeare Center, Brooklyn, New York on 16 November 2014 with John Douglas Thompson as Tamburlaine, Merritt Janson as Zenocrate/Callapine and a "large, multipurpose ensemble" cast.

A production of Tamburlaine was delivered by the Lazarus Theatre Company in London West End at the Tristan Bates Theatre between 25 August and 12 September 2015.

On 1 November 2014, Tamburlaine opened at Theatre for a New Audience where it won the 2015 Obie Award for John Douglas Thompson's Performance. It closed on 14 January 2015.

In August 2018, the Royal Shakespeare Company began a run of Tamburlaine in Stratford-upon-Avon, England.

While the play has been revived periodically over the past century, the obstacles it presents—a large cast and an actor capable of performing in such a challenging role chief among them—have prevented more widespread performance. In general, the modern playgoer may still echo F. P. Wilson's question, asked at mid-century, "How many of us can boast that we are more than readers of Tamburlaine?"

=== Islamophobia ===
The play has been criticised for being anti-Muslim.

In November 2005, a production of Tamburlaine at the Barbican Arts Centre amended the scene in which Tamburlaine burns the Quran and excoriates the Islamic Prophet Muhammad; instead, he defiles books representing all religious texts. The director, David Farr, stated this was done "to make it very clear that his act was a giant two fingers to the entire theological system, not an [sic] piece of Christian triumphalism over the barbarous Turk".

Some groups claimed the altering of this scene was a show of 'political correctness' and pandering to Muslim sensibilities. The director strongly denied this, stating:

One other thing should be made clear. Never in our rehearsal discussions did we receive any pressure from the Muslim community – this was never the question. Never did we receive any pressure from the Young Vic or the Barbican to change any scenes. Never did I receive external pressure of any kind. The decision to focus the play away from anti-Turkish pantomime to an existential epic was artistic, mine alone, and I stand by it.

== Other adaptations ==
There have been two adaptations on BBC radio, both of which have combined both parts into one broadcast. The first was on BBC Radio 3 on 26 September 1993 and directed by Michael Fox, starring Michael Pennington as Tamburlaine, Samantha Bond as Zenocrate, Clive Rowe as Theridamas, Louis Hilyer as Techelks, Peter Guinness as Usumcasane, Rudolph Walker as Bajazeth/Orcanes and Timothy Walker as Mycetes/Calyphas. The second adaptation, again on BBC Radio 3, was broadcast on 16 September 2012 and directed by Peter Kavanagh, with Con O'Neill as Tamburlaine, Susie Riddell as Zenocrate, Oliver Ford Davies as Mycetes, Kenneth Cranham as Cosroe, Shaun Prendergast as Techelles, Ewan Bailey as Theridamas and Edward de Souza as the Sultan. Klingon Tamburlaine, an unofficial fan production adapted from Christopher Marlowe’s Tamburlaine the Great, Parts I and II and reset in the Star Trek universe, was performed at the Hollywood Fringe Festival in 2019.

== See also ==
- Tamerlano
- Bajazet (opera)
