= NRB Bank =

Bangladeshi financial institution

- Company type: Public
- Industry: Banking
- Founded: 2013
- Founder: Mr. Iqbal Ahmed (OBE) DBA
- Headquarters: Dhaka, Bangladesh
- Area served: Bangladesh
- Key people: Iqbal Ahmed (Chairman); Mr. Tarek Reaz Khan (MD and CEO)
- Services: Banking; Financial services
- Website: www.nrbbankbd.com

NRB Bank is one of the fourth-generation private banks in Bangladesh. Iqbal Ahmed, OBE, DBA, founder chairman of the bank and chairman & chief executive of Seamark Group, is the chairman of the NRB Bank. Md Quamrul Islam Chowdhury is the chairman of the executive committee of the bank. Tarek Reaz Khan is the managing director and chief executive officer of NRB Bank.

== History ==
Migrants Bangladeshis had been demanding such a bank since the 1990s. However, Md. Bayazid Sarker, an economist and Central Bank official of Bangladesh, first developed a theoretical structure of the bank and officially floated the idea in his research paper titled "Alternative Resource of World Bank for External Financing in Bangladesh: A Foreign Remittance Approach" on 15 December 2007 in Dhaka. Bangladesh Bank called for NRB bank applications in 2011 and finally issued three NRB Bank (Non-resident Bangladeshis Bank) licenses in 2013; the NRB Banks are NRB Commercial Bank Limited, NRB Bank Limited and NRB Global Bank Limited. There is no difference between the operations of a regular bank and a NRB bank.

In 2014, NRB Bank provided a loan to Mohammad Shahed, Chairman of Regent Hospital, without proper collateral. The Anti-Corruption Commission filed two cases over the loans in 2020 against Shahed and bank officials.

In May 2015, Bangladesh Bank provided NRB Bank permission to operate agent banking.

Md Mehmood Husain was appointed managing director of NRB Bank on 1 August 2016. Md Mukhter Hossain, CEO and managing director of NRB Commercial Bank, was appointed an advisor to NRB Bank on 5 May 2021.

In September 2021, a special internal audit of NRB Bank found that the bank engaged in "unethical" investments in the stock market, causing a loss of 1.03 billion taka to the bank and adversely affecting the stock market. Bangladesh Bank fined the bank 4.95 million taka over the investments and market manipulation. The chief financial officer of NRB Bank was terminated. In the same month, the bank announced its intention to start an IPO. On 27 September 2021, the Anti-Corruption Commission filed charges against M Badiuzzaman, Director of NRB Bank, and his wife for allegedly embezzling 25.3 million taka from the bank.

In November 2021, the Bangladesh Securities and Exchange Commission began an investigation into the activities of NRB Bank.

In March 2025, Iqbal Ahmed, OBE, DBA, was elected chairman of the Board of Directors of NRB Bank, replacing Mohammed Mahtabur Rahman. In May 2025, Md Quamrul Islam Chowdhury was elected chairman of the Executive Committee of the Board. In mid-2025, Tarek Reaz Khan was appointed as managing director and chief executive officer of NRB Bank for a three-year term.
