= NRBC Bank =

Bangladeshi bank

NRBC Bank PLC.
- Industry: Banking
- Founded: 2013
- Headquarters: Dhaka, Bangladesh
- Area served: Bangladesh
- Key people: Ali Hossain Pradhania Chairman Dr. MD Touhidul Alam Khan Managing Director; MD]
- Services: Banking; Financial services
- Website: www.nrbcommercialbank.com

NRBC Bank PLC (formerly NRB Commercial Bank Limited) is a private commercial bank headquartered in Dhaka, Bangladesh. It was incorporated in 2013 and launched to serve non-resident Bangladeshis(NRBs), promoting investment and foreign remittance flows into the country. The bank adopted its current name, NRBC Bank PLC, in September 2023 and has been prominently listed on the Dhaka Stock Exchange since January 2021. It also offers Islamic, Conventional and OBU(Off-Shore Banking) services, operates NRBC bank securities LImited as a subsidiary. Md Ali Hossain Prodhaniya is the chairman of the bank, and Dr. Md Touhidul Alam Khan is the MD (Managing Director) and CEO.

== History ==
Migrants Bangladeshis had been demanding such a bank since the 1990s. However, Md. Bayazid Sarker, an economist and Central Bank official of Bangladesh, first developed a theoretical structure of the bank and officially floated the idea in his research paper titled "Alternative Resource of World Bank for External Financing in Bangladesh: A Foreign Remittance Approach" on 15 December 2007 in Dhaka. Bangladesh Bank called for NRB bank applications in 2011 and finally issued three NRB Bank (Non-resident Bangladeshis Bank) licenses in 2013; the NRB Banks are NRB Commercial Bank Limited (NRBC Bank PLC.), NRB Bank Limited and NRB Global Bank Limited. NRBC Bank PLC. was established on 2 April 2013. It was launched at Sonargaon Hotel and at the time was the first NRB bank of Bangladesh.

In April 2016, Farasath Ali was re-elected chairman of the bank and Toufique Rahman Chowdhury, founder of Metropolitan University, Sylhet, was reelected vice chairman of the bank.

In October 2017, the Parliamentary Standing Committee on the finance ministry expressed deep concerns over the activities of NRB Commercial Bank Limited and The Farmers Bank Limited and called for protecting them from bankruptcy. An investigation by Bangladesh Bank had found massive irregularities against the two banks. Chairman of NRB Commercial Bank Limited, Farasath Ali, did not attend the meeting of the Parliamentary Standing Committee on the finance ministry. Bangladesh Bank found officials of NRB Commercial Bank Limited guilty of forging the signatures of the bank directors and issuing 7 billion taka of loans violating banking rules. The bank violated policy when it gave loans to Shahidul Ahsan, former chairman of Mercantile Bank. Following the Bangladesh Bank report NRB Commercial Bank Limited removed Farasath Ali as chairman of the bank and replaced him with Tamal SM Parvez in December 2021. The bank also sent its managing director and Chief Executive Office, Dewan Mujibur Rahman, on leave and did not fire him after he secured a court verdict in his favor. Four other officials were removed from the bank. Bangladesh Bank would issue a two-year ban against Farasath Ali for irregularities.

In 2018, NRB Commercial Bank Limited was one of the worst performing banks in Bangladesh with high rates of loan defaulting. The same year Khondoker Rashed Maqsood was appointed CEO and managing director of the bank. Under him the bank tried to improve their reputation and make a break from the fiscal scandals.

In 2019 the bank had 71.85 billion taka in deposits and 62.01 billion in loans.

In 2020, Md Mukhter Hossain was appointed CEO and managing director of the bank. A major shareholder of the bank, Mohammad Shahid Islam, was sentenced to jail for human trafficking and money laundering in Kuwait.

NRBC Bank PLC. announced plans to go for initial public offering in February 2021. Asia Frontier Capital Limited and Asian Tiger Capital Partners were the IPO managers of the bank. NRBC Bank PLC. would be the first bank in 12 years to go for IPO in Bangladesh. In September 2021, Bangladesh Bank fined NRB Commercial Bank Limited for investing more than the allowed limit in the stock market. It imposed another fine worth around half a million taka against NRB Bank for the same reason. In October 2021, NRB Commercial Bank Limited stocks lost significant value index of Dhaka Stock Exchange.

NRBC Bank PLC. announced plans to issue 5 billion taka worth of subordinated bonds.
