= Apan Jewellers =

Bangladeshi retailer

Apan Jewellers is a chain of gold and diamond jewelry stores based in Dhaka, Bangladesh. It is the largest jewelry retailer in Bangladesh.

== History ==
Apan Jewellers has seven branches located in Dhaka including Gulshan Thana, Uttara Thana, and Dhanmondi. Apan Real Estate Limited is a sister company of the jewelers.

On 14 May 2017, the intelligence branch of Bangladesh Customs raided five branches of Apan Jewellers simultaneously in Dhaka and sealed one of them. They outlets were being investigated for gold smuggling and tax evasion. In 2018, Dildar Ahmed Selim, the owner of Apan Jewellers, was granted bail by the High Court in a money laundering case filed by the National Board of Revenue.
