= Bayezid II Mosque =

Bayezid II Mosque may refer to:

- Bayezid II Mosque, Istanbul
- Bayezid II Mosque, Amasya
