= Iqbal Ahmed =

Bangladesh-born British entrepreneur (born 1956)

Iqbal Ahmed OBE
- ইকবাল আহমেদ
- Born: 4 August 1956 (age 70); Balaganj Thana, Sylhet District, Sylhet, East Pakistan
- Citizenship: British
- Education: City College Westminster
- Occupation: Entrepreneur
- Years active: 1992–2020
- Style: Food processing
- Title: Chairman and Chief Executive of Seamark Group
- Website: www.seamark.co.uk

Iqbal Ahmed (Bengali: ইকবাল আহমেদ; born 4 August 1956) is a Bangladesh-born British entrepreneur. Based in Manchester, he made his fortune importing shrimp. His two companies, Seamark and Ibco, have extensive interests in shipping, hotel and real estate development, hospitality, and food.

== Early life ==
Ahmed was born in Balaganj Thana, Sylhet District, East Pakistan (now Bangladesh). In 1971, at the age of 15, he moved to the United Kingdom. He attended the City College in Westminster, and a few years later he joined his family's business located in Oldham, which his brothers Kamal and Bilal joined later after the business expanded.

== Career ==
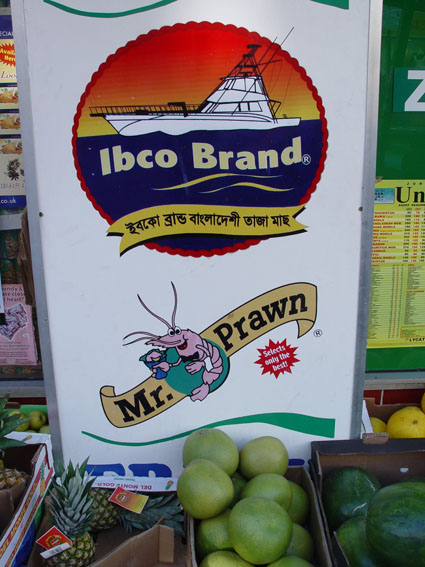
Seamark products sold in Bangladeshi grocery stores

Since March 1992, Ahmed has been CEO of the Seamark Group, which he founded with his brothers. The company Ibco is a supplier to the catering trade, and Seamark is the frozen-food processor. He also owns a hotel development, a Thai restaurant and bar called the Vermilion and Cinnabar (opened 14 November 2007), on Hulme Hall Lane which is worth £5 million, close to the City of Manchester Stadium.

In 2004, Seamark and Ahmed's brothers made a combined profit of £5.1 million on £108 million. The Ahmed family featured in the Sunday Times Rich List 2006, listed at number 511 with a total net worth of £110 million. In 2007, however, the rank fell to 574, and in 2008 to 644 at £120 million. Ahmed and his brothers were twice listed at number 20 in Top 20 richest Asians in UK with a net worth of £88 million in 2006, and of £90 million in 2007.

Ahmed and his family's Manchester-based business has a £200 million revenue across the city, with a workforce of 2,000 in Bangladesh, which is where he was born. The products are exported across Europe and America, as popular brand names such as Mr Prawn, Lily, Classic and Tiger. In 2001, a new sales office was created in the United States to distribute products in North America, located in New Jersey and in Brooklyn, New York City. He is popularly known as 'Mr Shrimp' or 'King Prawn' by the British community.

In 2006, Ahmed was nominated by The British Frozen Food Federation to represent their interest and concerns as a member of the Ethical Trading Champions' Group, which was set up as part of the Government's Food Industry Sustainability Strategy.

In 2007, Ahmed was invited to join an economic think tank, the New Enterprise Council, by George Osborne. Over the years he has played an active role in a number of government committees and advisory bodies. They include the Department of Trade and Industry's Southern Asia Advisory Group; the Competitiveness Council and the British Council's BOND initiative, which provides UK companies with low-cost introductions to potential business partners in key developing international markets.

== Awards and recognition ==
In 2001, Ahmed was appointed an Officer of the Order of the British Empire (OBE) in the 2001 New Year Honours for his services to international trade.

Ahmed was recognised for services to import and export at the Legends of Industry Award at the Hilton Manchester Deansgate hotel. In June 2012, he won the international entrepreneur of the year category in Ernst & Young's North region Entrepreneur of the Year Awards, held at The Lowry Hotel. In January 2013 and 2015, he was nominated for the Businessman of the Year award at the British Muslim Awards. In December 2014, he was awarded by the UK Trade & Investment (UKTI) for contributing to Britain's export.

== Personal life ==
Ahmed lives in Wilmslow, Cheshire. His brothers Bilal and Kamal live nearby. His hobbies include travelling, playing golf, tennis and swimming.

Ahmed also runs his own foundation to help and improve the lives of the poor in his native Bangladesh and is also the founder chairman of the NRB Bank project to support non-resident Bangladeshis in their contribution to the country's economy. In 2014, he set up a secondary school and college in Sylhet.

== See also ==
- British Bangladeshis
- Business of British Bangladeshis
- List of British Bangladeshis
