= Bangladesh Civil Service (Taxation) Association =

Trade association

- Headquarters: Dhaka, Bangladesh
- Location: 63 New Eskaton, Dhaka
- Region served: Bangladesh
- Official language: Bengali
- Website: bcstaxationassociation.com

The Bangladesh Civil Service (Taxation) Association, also called BCS Taxation Association, is the association of the Bangladesh Civil Service taxation cadre. Md Lutful Azim and Sheikh Shamim Bulbul are the president and secretary general of Bangladesh Civil Service (Taxation) Association.

== History ==
Bangladesh Civil Service is the civil service of Bangladesh with various cadres serving in different branches. The taxation cadre in on the branches and manages tax collection and organizations such as the National Board of Revenue. All cadres have their own associations such as Bangladesh Administrative Service Association, Bangladesh Police Service Association, and Bangladesh Judicial Service Association.

MA Quader Sarker, commissioner of taxes, and Salim Afzal, were elected president and general secretary of the association respectively in 2009.

In July 2015, Abdur Razzaque, National Board of Revenue, and Alamgir Hossain, Central Intelligence Cell, were elected president and general secretary of the association respectively. The association protested the shooting of National Board of Revenue member Barrister Jahangir Hossain.

Md Rezaul Karim Chowdhury and Mohammad Fazley Ahad Kaiser were elected president and general secretary of the association respectively in 2020. In April, the association donated one day salary to the relief fund of Prime Minister Sheikh Hasina accepted by her principal secretary Ahmad Kaikaus.

Tax commissioners Md Iqbal Hossain and Mohammad Mahmuduzzaman were elected president and general secretary of the association respectively in 2022. Commissioner of taxation Md Lutful Azeem and additional commissioner of taxation Sheikh Shameem Bulbul, were elected president and general secretary of the association respectively in 2024. Following the fall of the Sheikh Hasina led Awami League government the association demanded the appointment of a new chairman of the National Board of Revenue from its senior members.
