= Beyazıt (name) =

Beyazıt is a Turkish surname and a masculine name of Arabic origin, similar to "Beyazid"/Bayazid/Bayezid, and these names may be used interchangeably for some historical persons. Notable people with the name include:

== Surname ==
- Abdulkadir Beyazıt (born 1996), German footballer
- Selahattin Beyazıt (1931–2022), Turkish businessman

== Given name ==
- Beyazıt Öztürk (born 1969), Turkish television personality
