= Bangladesh Customs =

Bangladesh Customs বাংলাদেশ কাস্টমস
- Crest of Bangladesh Customs
- Common name: BD Customs

Agency overview
- Formed: 1972; 54 years ago
- Employees: 9,036 personnel

Jurisdictional structure
- National agency: Bangladesh
- Operations jurisdiction: Bangladesh
- Governing body: Government of Bangladesh
- Constituting instrument: The Customs act, 1969

Operational structure
- Headquarters: 8 No. Sarika Tower, Segun Bagicha, Dhaka, Bangladesh
- Agency executive: Md Abdur Rahman Khan, Chairman
- Parent agency: National Board of Revenue
- Intelligence wings: Customs Intelligence and Investigation Directorate; Central Intelligence Cell
- Functions: 8: Revenue Collection, Trade Facilities, Border Protection, Prevention of Smuggling, Environmental Protection, Immigration Compliance, Compliance Enforcement, International Cooperation

Website
- customs.gov.bd

Bangladesh Customs is the principal customs agency of Bangladesh. The agency is operating under the National Board of Revenue, the lead tax collection agency in Bangladesh. NBR is part of the Internal Resources Division (IRD) under the country's Ministry of Finance. The agency formulates policies concerning the levy and collection of customs duties and related taxes.

== History ==
Bangladesh Customs was formed under the National Board of Revenue in 1972 after the Independence of Bangladesh through the Customs Act. In 2016 Bangladesh Customs joined Operation IRENE to stop illegal trafficking of small arms and drugs.

== Intelligence branch ==
Bangladesh Customs has an intelligence division, responsible for preventing smuggling and tariff evasions. In 2016 it started operations to recover cars bought and sold in Bangladesh evading taxes, the cars were bought in by Foreign officials working in International agencies such as the World Bank and various agencies of the United Nations.
