= Bayezid II Mosque, Amasya =

Mosque in Amasya, Turkey

Bayezid II Mosque
- Amasya İkinci Beyazıt Külliyesi
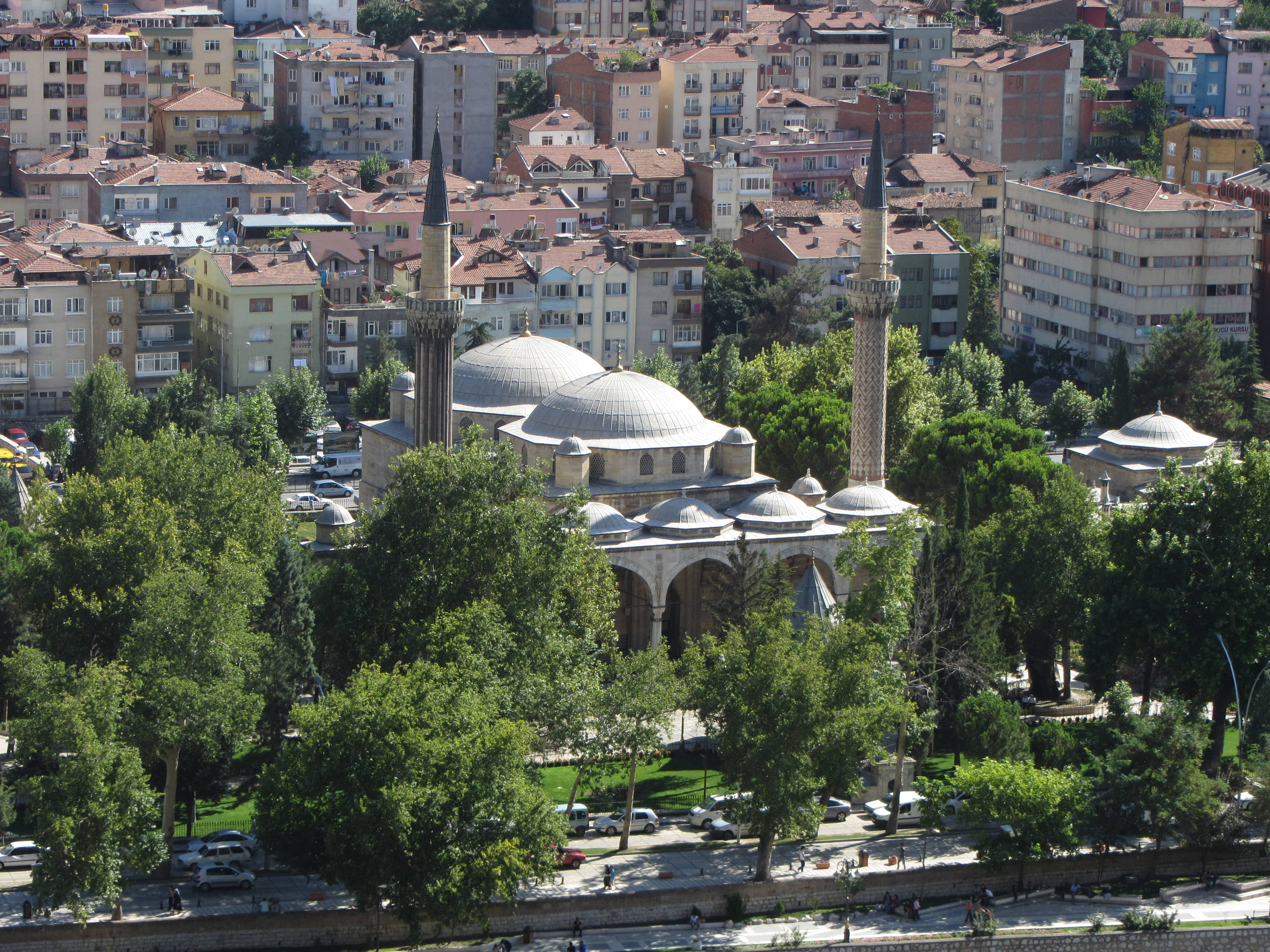

- Location within Turkey

Religion
- Affiliation: Islam

Location
- Municipality: Amasya
- Country: Turkey
- Interactive map of Bayezid II Mosque
- Coordinates: 40.650°N 35.827°E

Architecture
- Type: mosque
- Style: Ottoman
- Completed: 1486
- Minaret: 2

The Bayezid II Mosque (Turkish: Amasya İkinci Beyazıt Külliyesi) is a historical 15th century Mosque in Amasya, Turkey. The mosque was built in 1486 by order of the Ottoman sultan Bayezid II, it is the largest Külliye of the city.

== Building ==
The Mosque has an inverse T plan of the Bursa type mosques, the prayer hall is covered by two domes. It has a portico covered by five domes and two minarets with one balcony. The mosque is part of a larger complex (Külliye) which consists of a Madrasa (Islamic school), fountain, Imaret (public charity kitchen) and a library.
