= Business of British Bangladeshis =

British Bangladeshis are people who arrived from Bangladesh to the United Kingdom, and throughout the years have started to create new businesses throughout the country, especially in Brick Lane, where there are many Bangladeshi restaurants. Bangladeshis were the first to have started the curry industry in the UK, from small businesses. The curry is now regarded as Britain's National dish. Many others also own supermarket stores specialising in Bangladeshi products, and also in the media, the main Bengali channels - Bangla TV and Channel S.

== Curry industry ==
Today many of the Bangladeshi community are now part of the Curry Industry in Britain, more than 8 out of 10 Indian restaurants in the UK are owned by British Bangladeshis, 95% of which come from Sylhet. The number of restaurants owned by Bangladeshis increased rapidly years after years. In 1946, there were 20 restaurants or small cafes which were owned by Bengalis; then in 1960 there were 300 owned; and by 1980, more than 3,000 have been created by them. Now, as of today there are 8,500 Indian restaurants, of which around 7,200 are Bangladeshi. One of the main dishes in those restaurants, the chicken tikka masala, is now regarded as Britain's national food dish. The curry industry is seen as a great success for Bangladeshis living in Britain, the industry which changed the culture of food in British cuisine. Chicken tikka masala is now served in restaurants around the globe, and a UK survey claimed it is the country's most popular restaurant dish. One in seven curries sold in the UK is a chicken tikka. The popularity of the dish led the British Foreign Secretary Robin Cook to proclaim it as Britain's true national dish. Former prime minister, Tony Blair also recognised it as the favourite dish, by eating at a Bangladeshi curry restaurant for his daughter's birthday.

=== Curry threat ===
In April 2008, restaurants owned by Bangladeshis came under threat. Many of those who work in these businesses are recent immigrants legally brought in from outside the UK. The British government announced it would change immigration laws for these workers, blocking access for high skilled chefs from Bangladesh. The law demanded these workers speak fluent English, and have good formal qualifications in order to meet the requirements of society and work in Britain.

These laws have not only affected the Bangladeshis, but have hit other migrant workers from China and India. However, the legislation may have a particularly dramatic effect on Bangladeshis because so many of them rely heavily on the curry business. It has been estimated that 30% of their restaurant businesses are seriously threatened by these new laws. On 20 April 2008, 44,000 people gathered and protested in London, including Bangladeshis, Chinese and Indians and other groups who were unhappy with the changes to the law. They argued their contribution to the economy of the United Kingdom meant they deserved better treatment.

== Local business ==
Many other Bangladeshis own grocery stores. Whitechapel has a thriving local street market which is located opposite the famous Royal London Hospital, which is the largest hospital in Britain. The market offers many low-priced goods for the people working in the area and the local Bengali community. People will go there to grab a bargain every day from Monday to Saturday, which contains over 80 stalls selling many products and foods, everything from fresh fruit to fish, clothing, bedding, carpets, jewellery and electrical goods such as toys. The nearby East London Mosque ensures a steady stream of visitors and many stalls now sell Indian spices and exotic vegetables as well as great quality silks and saree fabric.

Also in Whitechapel, Brick Lane, other than curry being served, there are many Bengali staples available such as jack fruit, betel nut and paan leaves and frozen fish caught from the Surma River. Various travel agents offer many flights to Sylhet with the national airline, Biman Bangladesh Airlines, for around £500 and a new airline called, Air Sylhet was created by British Bangladeshi diaspora, offering low cost flights between both countries.

Every Bangladeshi business located in the East End seems to hark back to the city of Sylhet, for example the Weekly Sylheter Dak - which has a UK circulation of around 7,000 a week; a shop called Sylhet Stores; a lawyers' office called Sylhet & Co; and a Bangladeshi Welfare Association. There are also booming black market in money transfer, such as First Solution Money Transfer which in June 2007, the company went into liquidation owing nearly £2 million to the public who used their services. Seamark and Ibco, owned by millionaire Iqbal Ahmed, Taj Stores, First Bangladeshi Real Estates in UK called Masha Estates Ltd and many others.

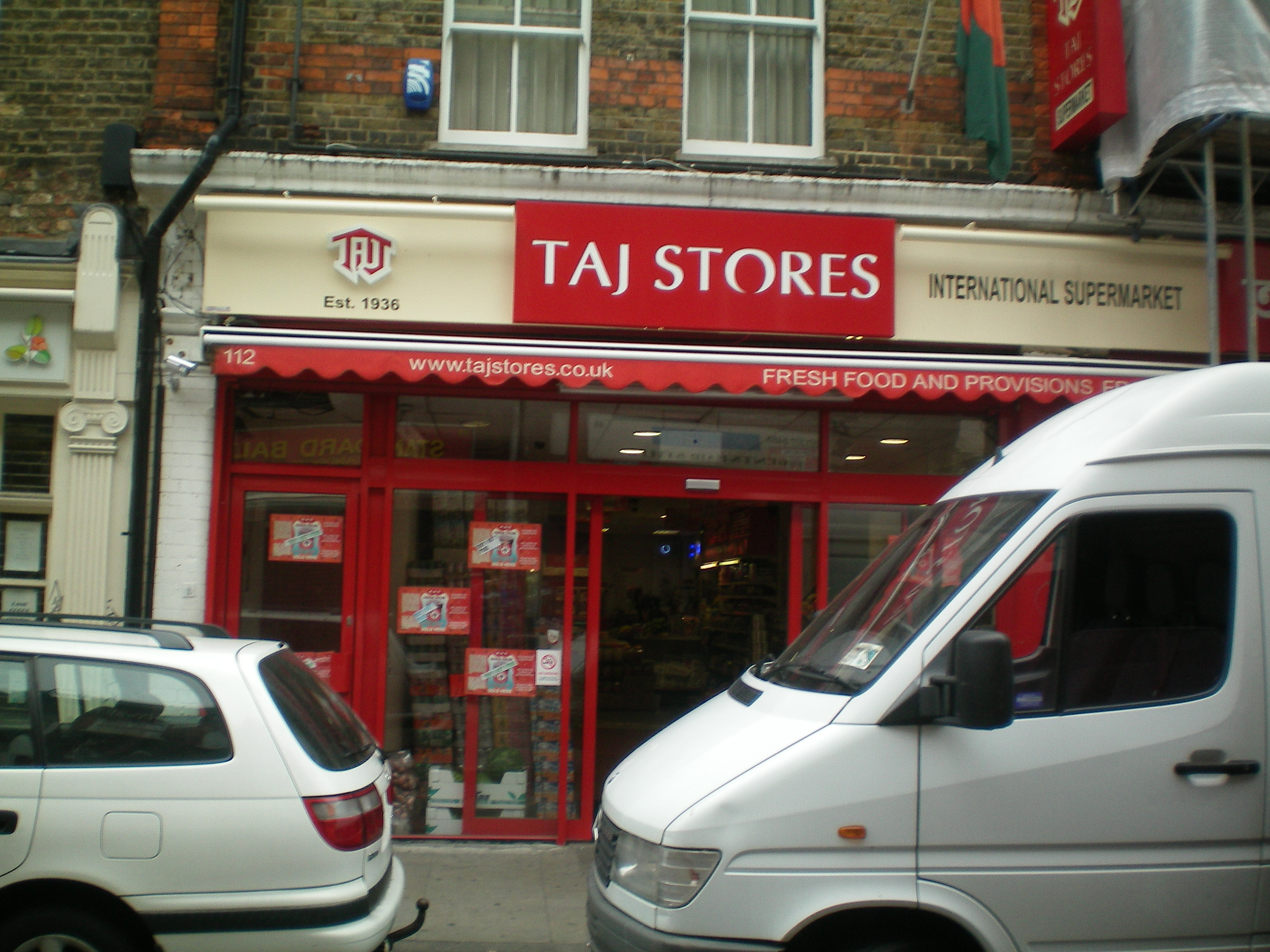
The International, Bangladeshi grocery store, Taj Stores

There also hundreds of fast food stores scattered across east London, owned by Bangladeshis. Mainly named as Perfect Fried Chicken or Halal Fried Chicken and many other names. These fast food shops are primarily found in Stepney, Bethnal Green and Hackney.

== Media ==
People have gone beyond by working in media, where the first Bangladeshi channel abroad was created called Bangla TV in 1999, and later another channel called Channel S in 2004, 19 October 2017 another channel launched called ION TV UK the Asian community' reflects on the programs it broadcasts, with many talk shows offering advice from lawyers and barristers such as 'Legal Advice', talk shows, Bengali film and entertainment, an Islamic voice for the community, and much of the channel that broadcasts in the community language, Sylheti - the only Bangladeshi channel to do so. Channel S had acquired the rights to broadcast the Baishakhi Mela, and there has been bitter rivalry between both channels. Also Bangla news published from London are Weekly Surma, Notun Din, Jonomot, daily Amader Protidin, Probasha Protidin, Potrica etc. Other notable business companies include, NRB Media, Masha Estates Ltd, Purple i - an IT expert company providing solutions to many restaurants,

== First Solution Money Transfer ==
In July 2007, a British-based firm called 'First Solution Money Transfer' went into liquidation. Company chairman, Dr. Fazal Mahmood, admitted the business owed hundreds of thousands of pounds to the public. The firm claimed it had lost control of the money it handled due to a lack of regulation in this fast-growing sector of the economy.

The company was heavily used by the Bangladeshi community to send money to relatives in Bangladesh. However, huge amounts of this cash were lost. The scandal provoked anger amongst the community. Dr. Mahmood received death threats and his home was pelted with eggs. Local leaders asked tough questions about the business's management, and the MP George Galloway raised the matter in the House of Commons. It eventually emerged that the company had misappropriated an estimated 1.7 million pounds of their clients money.

== See also ==
- List of British Bangladeshis
- Economy of Bangladesh
