= Bayazid Sarker =

Bangladeshi economist and central banker

Muhammad Bayazid Sarker
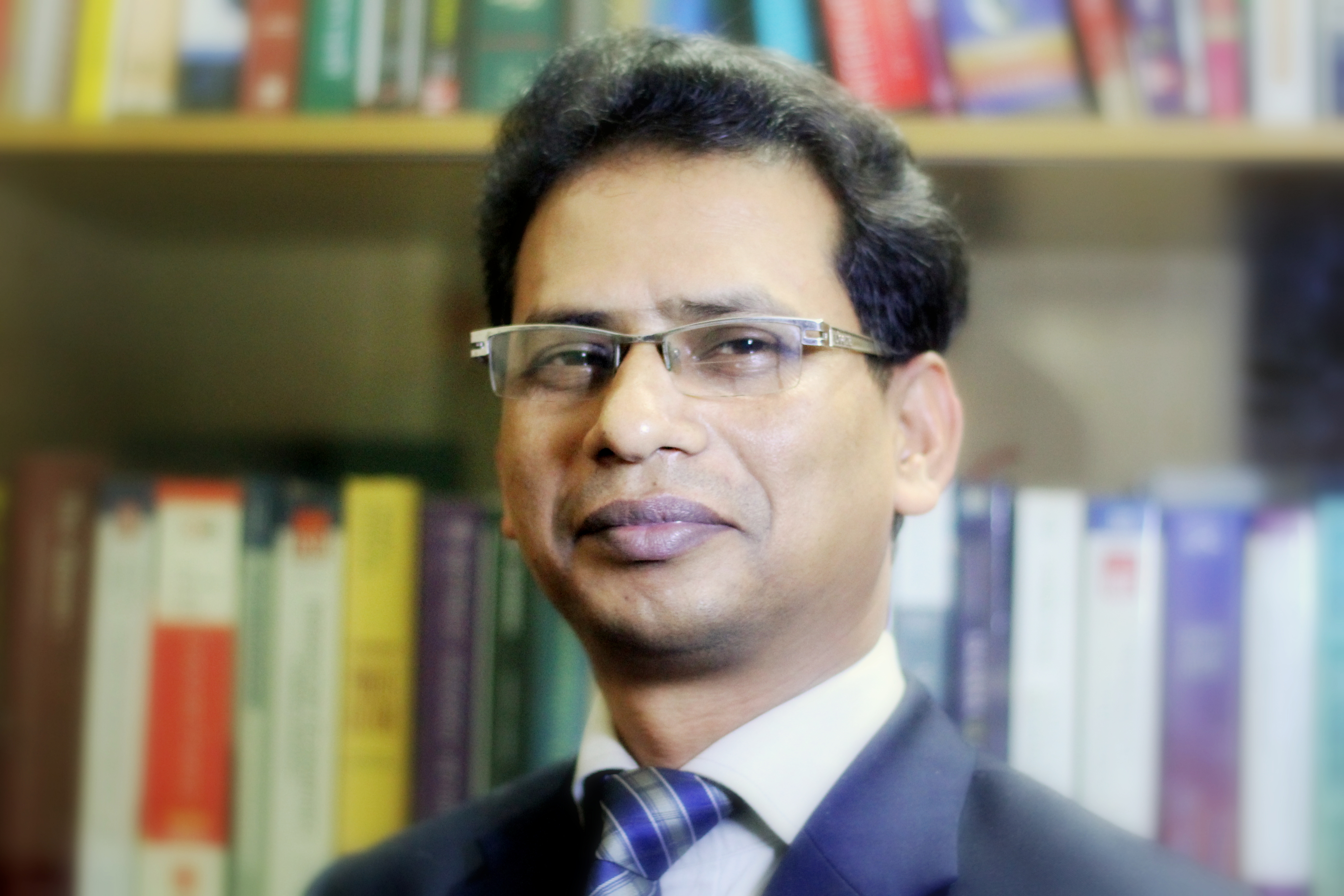
- Born: January 1, 1971 (age 55); Chapai Nawabganj, East Pakistan, Pakistan

Academic work
- Discipline: Banking, International monetary economics
- Institutions: Bangladesh Bank [The Central Bank of Bangladesh]
- Notable ideas: Migrants sponsored banking known as NRB banks, Cross border money demand function [an extension of Keynesian money demand function ] Privatization under private organization

Muhammad Bayazid Sarker (born January 1, 1971) is a Bangladeshi economic researcher and central banker. He has been working at Bangladesh Bank (BB) since 1999. Currently he is the director of the Banking Regulation and Policy Department [BRPD]. He is also an adjunct faculty of the business school of North South University. In 2007, Sarker developed a theoretical structure of migrants' sponsored bank [MSB] as an alternative source of external financing for developing economies like Bangladesh. The idea of MSB was also presented by Sarker in Kuala Lumpur on April 15, 2008. According to Sarker's developed concept, the MSB banking model is equally applicable for developing or emerging economies deficient in both capital and foreign exchange coupled with having a good base of non-residents earning abroad.

== Early life and education ==
The sixth of nine children, Sarker was born on January 1, 1971, to a Muslim family in the village of Sarkerpara under Chapai Nawabganj district, a west-northern part of Bangladesh. His father was Md. Latifur Rahman Sarker, a public health inspector, and his mother was Sekina Khatun. His early childhood was spent in the village. He finished his bachelor's and master's in economics at Dhaka University in 1997. In 2010, Sarker was awarded a Master of Public Policy from the National Graduate Institute of Policy Studies [GRIPS], Tokyo. In 2012, Mr. Sarker also finished his MBA in international business from Dhaka University.

== After graduation ==
After his graduation, he engaged in some research works under the Bangladesh Institute of Development Studies (BIDS) and a couple of private research firms for two years. In March 1999, he joined Bangladesh Bank, the central bank of Bangladesh, as an assistant director. In his central banking job, Sarker works in bank examination, foreign exchange, public debt management, risk management, and banking regulation departments. During the central banking job, Sarker visited Japan, Russia, China, Malaysia, Singapore, the Philippines, and India to participate in different international training and seminars.
His concept of migrants' sponsored banking for encouraging self-dependency in development financing of emerging labor exporting countries. The idea has been partially implemented in Bangladesh.

== Personal life ==
In 2003, Sarker married Mahfuja Hoque Sarker, who is a banker by profession. They have one son, Ismail Sarker, and one daughter, Juwairyah Amreen Sarker. They reside in Banani, Dhaka.
