= Central Intelligence Cell =

Specialized unit of the Bangladesh National Board of Revenue

- সেন্ট্রাল ইন্টেলিজেন্স সেল

Agency overview
- Formed: 1972; 54 years ago
- Jurisdiction: Government of Bangladesh
- Headquarters: 8 No. Sarika Tower, Segun Bagicha, Dhaka, Bangladesh
- Annual budget: Allocated by Government
- Agency executive: Ahsan Habib, Director General
- Parent agency: National Board of Revenue
- Website: nbr.gov.bd

The Central Intelligence Cell (Bengali: কেন্দ্রীয় গোয়েন্দা সেল; abbreviated as CIC) is a specialized intelligence and investigative unit of the National Board of Revenue under the Government of Bangladesh, responsible for intelligence gathering, analysis, and investigation related to customs, taxation, and revenue-related offenses.

== History ==
The Central Intelligence Cell was established in 2004 to investigate tax evasion. The Central Intelligence Cell investigated pre-shipment inspection company Cotecna in 2007 and found that it had under invoiced imported cars to help importers evade taxes. The director general of the cell was included in the National Coordination Committee on Combating Corruption and Crime led by Major General Masud Uddin Chowdhury and retired Major General M. A. Matin. It sought the bank accounts of Shamim Iskander, brother of former prime minister Khaleda Zia. It sought information on the bank accounts of Khaleda Zia and ten of her family members. It also sought the bank accounts of other major politicians such as Kazi Zafarullah and family members of Saifur Rahman, former minister of finance. It sought the bank accounts of Lutfozzaman Babar, former minister of home affairs, Ashraf Hossain, former whip, and Shahjahan Omar. The cell investigated Mahbuba Sultana, the wife of Mosaddak Ali Falu, for taking a salary from NTV and not pay tax.

In 2008, the Central Intelligence Cell discovered that two companies, Bay Fishing Co Limited and United Edible Oils Limited, under invoiced their exports of edible oil to India so that their partners in India could pay lower import taxes. The incident was also investigated by the Export Promotion Bureau. It received funding from the government of the United Kingdom through the Tax Administration Capacity and Taxpayer Services.

The Central Intelligence Cell is outside the purview of the Right to Information Act, 2009. It sought the bank accounts of Delwar Hossain Sayeedi, a leader of Bangladesh Jamaat-e-Islami, in 2010 along with Mahmudur Rahman, editor of Amar Desh, and his wife. In April 2012, the Central Intelligence Cell froze the bank accounts of the chairman and directors of Destiny Group.

In November 2014, the Central Intelligence Cell, in an unprecedented move, sought the bank information of Ghulam Hussain, chairman of the National Board of Revenue. It investigated a number of travel agencies but found they had engaged in tax evasion by hiding some their income. From 2004 to 2014, the cell identified 15.81 billion BDT in tax evasions and collected 7.25 billion BDT in taxes. It works with the Anti-Money Laundering Department of Bangladesh Bank. In October 2014, Md Belal Uddin from Tax Appellate Tribunal was appointed director general of Central Intelligence Cell.

In 2015, the director of Central Intelligence Cell Alamgir Hossain was elected secretary general of Bangladesh Civil Service (Taxation) Association. Central Intelligence Cell investigated assistant commissioner of the National Board of Revenue Md Zahidul Islam and found allegations of corruption against him to be true. The National Board of Revenue gave the cell the authority to investigate money laundering under the Money Laundering Prevention Act, 2015.

In January 2016, Central Intelligence Cell sought information from Central Depository of Bangladesh Limited on bank accounts of noted economist Debapriya Bhattacharya and his wife Irina Bhattacharya. The cell sought the information after Centre for Policy Dialogue, where he worked as an advisor, published a critical report on the economy of Bangladesh. Bhattacharya said it was similar to harassments he faced during the Bangladesh Nationalist Party government.

In 2017, the director-general of the NBR's Central Intelligence Cell Md Belal Uddin was included in a committee to investigate the presence of outsiders at the Chittagong Custom House. In August, the cell froze the bank accounts of former prime minister Khaleda Zia and sought details on the accounts from the banks.

The cell investigated contractor SM Golam Kibria Shamim who had 3 billion BDT cash in his accounts in 2019. It ordered a freeze on the bank accounts of Shamim, his family members, and Khaled Mahmud Bhuiyan, leader of Jubo League. It sought information on the bank accounts of Md Monir Hossain. The Central Intelligence Cell opened an investigation into Evaly, an e-commerce platform, in October 2020. The cell ordered blocking of all bank accounts of Regent Group and JKG Healthcare.

The cell sought information on bank accounts of M Abdus Sobhan, former vice-chancellor of the University of Rajshahi, and four member of his family in May 2021. He had allegedly recruited staff illegally while at the university.

In June 2022, the cell sought information on the bank accounts of 10 family members of the family which owns Partex Group.

Central Intelligence Cell found SK Sur Chowdhury, former deputy governor of Bangladesh Bank, and his wife had evaded taxes after investigating them. Following the cell's recommendation, the National Board of Revenue ordered all banks accounts of Chowdhury and wife to be frozen. It also sought information on the bank accounts of executive director of Bangladesh Md Shah Alam.
