= British Asians =

British people of Asian descent

- Asian/Asian British population percentage across the United Kingdom in 2011

Total population
- United Kingdom: 5,758,104 – 8.6% (2021/22 Census) (Note: All usual residents of the ethnic group 'Asian, Asian Scottish, Asian Welsh or Asian British' across the United Kingdom (Indian, Pakistani, Bangladeshi, Chinese and Other Asian)): Indian – 1,927,150 – 2.9% (2021/22); Pakistani – 1,662,286 – 2.5% (2021/22); Bangladeshi – 651,834 – 1.0% (2021/22) (Note: Excludes Northern Ireland); Chinese – 502,216 – 0.8% (2021/22); Other Asian – 1,010,209 – 1.5% (2021/22)

Regions with significant populations
- England: 5,426,392 – 9.7% (2021)
- Scotland: 212,022 – 3.9% (2022)
- Wales: 89,028 – 3.0% (2021)
- Northern Ireland: 30,667 – 1.6% (2021)

Languages
- British English · Asian languages

Religion
- Plurality of Islam (46.0%); minorities follow Hinduism (17.5%), Christianity (10.5%), Sikhism (7.7%), other faiths (3.9%) (Note: Including Buddhism (2.9%), Judaism (0.03%), Jainism, Ravidassia, Zoroastrianism and others) or are irreligious (9.1%); 2021 census, NI, England and Wales only

Related ethnic groups
- Asian people; Dutch Asians; Asian Americans; Asian Canadians; Asian Caribbeans; Asian Africans; Asian Brazilians

British Asians (also referred to as Asian Britons) are British people of Asian descent. They constitute a significant and growing minority of the people living in the United Kingdom, with a population of 5.76 million people or 8.6% of the population identifying as Asian or Asian British in the 2021 United Kingdom census. This represented an increase from a 6.9% share of the UK population in 2011, and a 4.4% share in 2001.

Represented predominantly by South Asian ethnic groups with over 4 million people, census data regarding birthplace and ethnicity demonstrate around a million Asian British people derive their ancestry between East Asia, Southeast Asia, Central Asia, and West Asia. Since the 2001 census, British people of Asian descent have been included in the "Asian/Asian British" grouping ("Asian, Asian Scottish or Asian British" grouping in Scotland) of the UK census questionnaires, but only British South Asians were initially included in the category. The category was extended to include British East and Southeast Asians in the 2011 census. Categories for British Indians, British Pakistanis, British Bangladeshis, British Chinese, British Hongkongers and other Asians have existed under an Asian British heading since the 2011 census. In British English usage, especially in less formal contexts, the term "Asian" usually refers to people who trace their ancestry to the Indian subcontinent or South Asia, contrary to other Anglosphere countries (Australia, Canada and the United States) where the term "Asian" usually refers to people who trace their ancestry to East and Southeast Asia.

There is a long history of migration to the United Kingdom (and its predecessor states) from across Asia. British colonies and protectorates throughout Asia brought lascars (sailors and militiamen) to port cities in Britain. Immigration of small numbers of South Asians to England began with the arrival of the East India Company to the Indian subcontinent, and the decline of the Mughal Empire, at the end of the 16th century. Between the 17th and mid-19th century, increasingly diverse lascar crews heading for Britain imported East Asians, such as Japanese and Chinese seamen, Southeast Asians, such as Malays, South Asians such as the Indians (including the people from Pakistan), Bengalis and Ceylonese and post-Suez Canal; West Asians, such as Armenians and Yemenis, who settled throughout the United Kingdom.

In particular, Indians also came to Britain for educational or economic reasons during the British Raj (with most returning to India after a few months or years) and in greater numbers as the Indian independence movement led to the partition of 1947, eventually creating the separate countries of India, Pakistan and Bangladesh. The most significant wave of Asian immigration to and settlement in the United Kingdom came following the Second World War with the resumed control of Hong Kong, the breakup of the British Empire and the independence of Pakistan, India, Sri Lanka and later Bangladesh, especially during the 1950s and 1960s. An influx of Asian immigrants also took place following the expulsion or flight of Indian communities (then holders of British passports) from the newly independent Uganda, Kenya and Tanzania in the early 1970s.

Since the 2010s, British Asians have achieved positions of high political office; Sadiq Khan (of Pakistani descent) became Mayor of London in 2016, Rishi Sunak (of Indian descent) became the first British Asian Prime Minister of the United Kingdom in October 2022 and Humza Yousaf (also of Pakistani descent) became First Minister of Scotland in March 2023.

== Terminology ==
In Britain, the word "Asian" most frequently refers to people with ancestry from the Indian subcontinent (Indians, Pakistanis, Bangladeshis, Sri Lankans). This usage contrasts with that in the United States, where it is used primarily to refer to people of East and Southeast Asian origin. It reflects the different histories of the countries and the origins of their early waves of immigration from Asia.

In British English usage, the term Asian usually refers to people who trace their ancestry to South Asia, in particular the former British Raj and Ceylon (the modern countries of India, Pakistan, Bangladesh, Sri Lanka and the Maldives). The British Sociological Association's guidelines on equality and diversity suggest that "South Asian" is more precise than "Asian" and that the latter should not be used where there is a risk of it conflating South Asians with people from elsewhere in Asia.

=== Census ===
The Office for National Statistics uses the term "Asian / Asian British" to categorise British Indians, British Pakistanis, British Bangladeshis, British Chinese people and people of any other Asian ancestry.

Definitions and naming conventions for the category have evolved in the history of UK censuses. The 1991 United Kingdom census was the first to include a question on ethnicity (apart from in Northern Ireland, where the question was not asked until 2001). The question had tick-boxes for "Indian", "Pakistani" and "Bangladeshi". There was also a tick box, as well as a general "Any other ethnic group (please describe)" option for those not wishing to identify with any of the pre-set tick boxes. For the 2001 census, in England and Wales, "Indian", "Pakistani" and "Bangladeshi" and "Any other Asian background (please write in)" options were grouped under an "Asian or Asian British" heading, with appearing under a separate heading. In Scotland, all of these tick-boxes were grouped together under an "Asian, Asian Scottish or Asian British" heading, and in Northern Ireland no broad headings were used, just tick-boxes for each of the Asian groups.

The 2011 census questionnaire was more consistent with regard to the grouping of Asian ethnicities, such that Indian, Pakistani, Bangladeshi, Chinese and any other Asian background options appeared under a broad "Asian/Asian British" ("Asian, Asian Scottish or Asian British" in Scotland) heading in all parts of the UK. Shown in order, as listed on the 2011 Census form, the five categories of Asian British are:

- Asian / Asian British: Indian, a reference to the South Asian nation of India and British Indians.
- Asian / Asian British: Pakistani, a reference to the South Asian nation of Pakistan and British Pakistanis.
- Asian / Asian British: Bangladeshi, a reference to the South Asian nation of Bangladesh and British Bangladeshis.
- Asian / Asian British: Chinese, a reference to the East Asian nation of China and British Chinese people.
- Asian / Asian British: Other Asian, a broad description suitable for specifying self-identified ethnic descent from South Asian nations without an exclusive category (e.g. Sri Lanka and British Sri Lankans), the same application for other East Asian nations (e.g. Japan and British Japanese) and British people of West Asian, Central Asian and Southeast Asian heritage.

=== Subgroups ===
There are several regional subgroupings of Asian British people, and Asians living in the United Kingdom generally. As approximately defined concepts, sometimes due to varying geographical regionalisation of the Asian continent, the subgroups are often utilized in broad ethnic or cultural classification. Despite wider use, the Office for National Statistics (ONS) does not provide geographic distinctions within the census, meaning all people born in Asia (regardless of region), or with Asian ancestry, are provided designation as "Asian / Asian British". The ONS did, however, acknowledge East, South, Southeast and West Asian individuals in its final recommendations report for the 2011 United Kingdom census.

Census results show that Asian Britons with descent from across all of Asia are represented in the UK. For example, births in the Philippines and Thailand in Southeast Asia, or Iran and Iraq in West Asia, are among the highest in the Other Asian subcategory of "Asian / Asian British". Outside of the census, organisation and bodies have made explicit use of such geographic classifications. These have included the British Heart Foundation, the Greater London Authority, and the Foreign, Commonwealth and Development Office. In alphabetical order, some of these subgroups are:

- British East Asians, including British Chinese, British Hongkongers, British Japanese, British Koreans and British Mongolians
- British South Asians, including British Afghans, British Bangladeshis, British Bhutanese, British Indians, British Nepalese, British Pakistanis and British Sri Lankans
- British Southeast Asian, including British Burmese, British Filipinos, British Indonesians, British Malaysians, British Singaporeans, British Thais and British Vietnamese
- British West Asian, including British Armenians, British Azerbaijanis, British Iranians, British Iraqis, British Israelis, British Kurds, British Lebanese, British Syrians, British Turks and British Yemenis

=== Various terms ===
Terms to describe British people with Asian heritage are varied and are subject to gradual change created by study in academia, reporting in journalistic works, coverage in other media forms, as well as concepts of self-identity and personhood. Some of the terms used to describe residents and citizens of the United Kingdom with ancestry from Asia are, in alphabetical order, as follows:

==== Asian Briton ====
The term Asian Briton has been consistently used to refer to someone who is a British citizen or resident with ancestry from across the continent of Asia. In 2005, social science researcher Praful Bidwai used Asian Briton as an example of a "mixed" identity. In 2011, multiple scholars, such as Timothy Garton Ash and Sonja Licht, used the term as an example of a hyphenated or dual identity within Europe.

Use of "Asian Briton" has appeared as both an illustrative term in media and for purposes of self-identity. For example, in 2005, politician Shailesh Vara was described as an Ugandan Asian Briton. Television presenter Sonia Deol and journalist Yasmin Alibhai-Brown have identified themselves as Asian Britons. In 1999, Alibhai-Brown published an Institute for Public Policy Research report, advising various departments of the Government of the United Kingdom to use the term Asian Briton. Research project Minorities at Risk described this as an effort "to link ethnic groups to their heritage, and to make greater recognition of the sacrifices made by members of ethnic groups during World War II".

==== British Asian ====
British Asian is a widely used term to describe British persons of Asian descent with either citizenship or residency in the UK. Although not following the UK's census formatting, there are numerous examples of the term gaining cultural traction in the country.

Founded by Charles, Prince of Wales in 2007, the British Asian Trust follows the naming convention resultant from the popularity of the term, and projects an association to the category of British Asian people. After the appointment of Katy Perry as an ambassador of the Trust in 2020, The Guardian questioned the merit of whether the American singer was a person "who inhabits the values of the British Asian community", reporting that Perry was "neither British nor Asian".

The term has also received some criticism. BBC Asian Network commissioned an opinion poll that found that the majority of Asians in the UK disliked the term due to its inferred generalisation. Academic Roxy Harris has critiqued the term of "British Asian" as essentialising and hierarchising the values, or order of priority, of "British" and "Asian". The portmanteau Brasian has also been proposed as an alternative form of the term. In the course of the 2010s, usage of British Asian broadened in British media usage and in self-identification by British citizens or residents, to increasingly also include British people of heritage other than South Asia, such as East Asia and West Asia. In the 2011 census, the two categories Chinese and Other Asian were listed explicitly under the broad heading and within the grouping of "Asian/Asian British".

== Demographics ==
=== Population ===
British Asian population by region and country
Region / Country	2021 (Note: 2021/22: England and Wales, Scotland, and Northern Ireland)		2011 (Note: 2011: England and Wales, Scotland, and Northern Ireland)		2001 (Note: 2001: England and Wales, Scotland, and Northern Ireland)		1991 (Note: For the purpose of harmonising results to make them comparable across censuses, Chinese is included in this definition of 'Asian or British Asian' instead of in the 'Chinese or other ethnic group'. The 2011 census was the first time that Chinese was included in the 'Asian or Asian British' category.) (Note: 1991: Great Britain. Northern Ireland did not record ethnic group data in the 1991 census.)	
Region / Country	Number	%	Number	%	Number	%	Number	%
England	5,426,392	9.61%	4,143,403	7.82%	2,248,289	4.58%	1,762,262	3.75%
—Greater London	1,817,640	20.66%	1,511,546	18.49%	866,693	12.08%	690,031	10.33%
—West Midlands	794,264	13.35%	604,435	10.79%	385,573	7.32%	297,829	5.78%
—South East	650,545	7.01%	452,042	5.24%	186,615	2.33%	149,198	1.99%
—North West	622,685	8.39%	437,485	6.20%	229,875	3.42%	174,878	2.60%
—Yorkshire and the Humber	487,055	8.89%	385,964	7.30%	222,486	4.48%	159,355	3.29%
—East of England	405,869	6.41%	278,372	4.76%	121,752	2.26%	99,720	1.97%
—East Midlands	391,103	8.01%	293,423	6.47%	168,913	4.05%	135,257	3.42%
—South West	159,184	2.79%	105,537	2.00%	32,800	0.67%	28,368	0.62%
—North East	98,046	3.70%	74,599	2.87%	33,582	1.34%	27,626	1.09%
Scotland	212,022 (Note: Scotland held its census a year later after the rest of the United Kingdom due to the COVID-19 pandemic. As a result, data shown is for 2022 as opposed to 2021.)	3.90%	140,678	2.66%	71,317	1.41%	47,456	0.95%
Wales	89,028	2.86%	70,128	2.29%	25,448	0.88%	24,399	0.86%
Northern Ireland	30,667	1.61%	19,130	1.06%	6,824	0.40%	—N/a	—N/a
United Kingdom	5,758,109	8.60%	4,373,661	6.92%	2,578,826	4.39%	1,834,117 (Note: Figures are for Great Britain only, i.e. excludes Northern Ireland)	3.34%

=== 2021 census ===
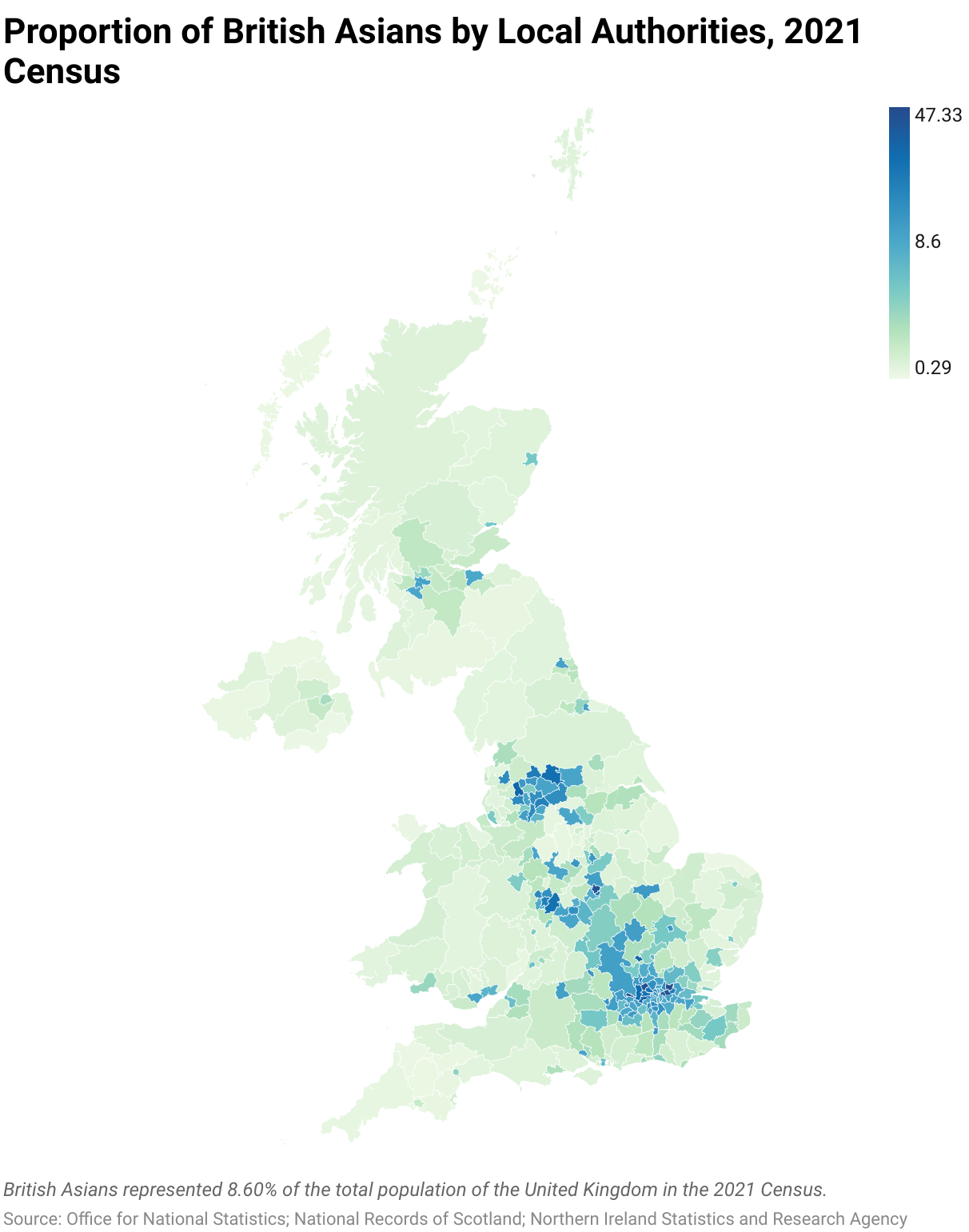
Distribution by local authority, 2021 census

Asian/Asian British population pyramid in 2021

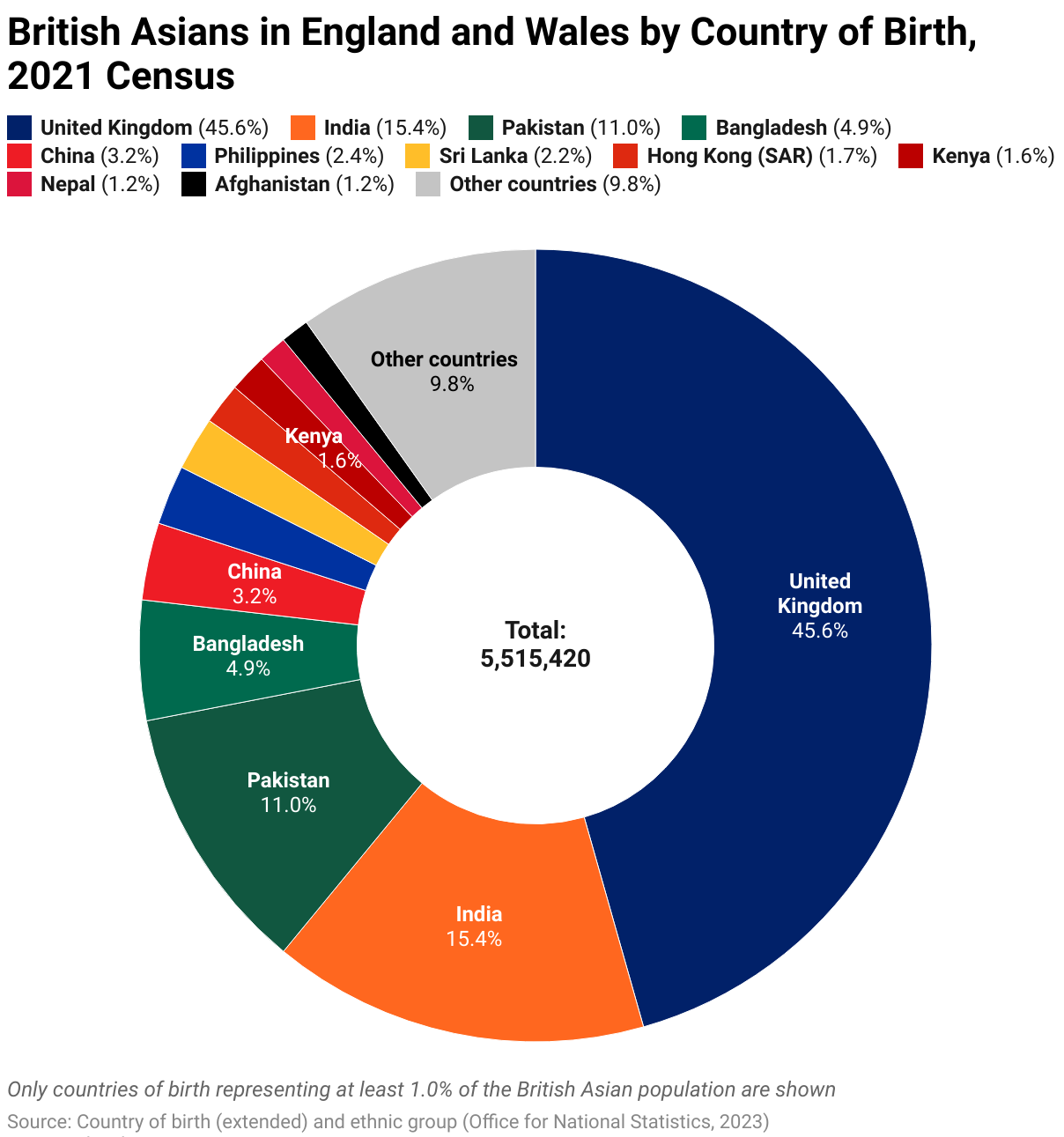
British Asians by country of birth (2021 census, England and Wales)

According to the 2021 United Kingdom census, those identifying as Asian British in England and Wales enumerated 5,515,420, or 9.3% of the population In Northern Ireland, 30,667, or 1.6% of the population, identified as Asian or British Asian. The census in Scotland was delayed for a year and took place in 2022, the equivalent figure was 212,022, representing 3.9% of the population. The ten local authorities with the largest proportion of people who identified as Asian were: Redbridge (47.33%), Slough (46.75%), Harrow (45.23%), Tower Hamlets (44.43%), Leicester (43.40%), Newham (42.21%), Luton (36.99%), Hounslow (36.73%), Blackburn with Darwen (35.66%) and Hillingdon (33.32%). In Scotland, the highest proportion was in Glasgow at 11.08%; in Wales, the highest concentration was in Cardiff at 9.66%; and in Northern Ireland, the highest concentration was in Belfast at 3.74%.

Due to a growing sense of affiliation with Britain, many third generation South Asians chose to not mark "Asian or British Asian" and instead marked "British Asian" in the "Other Asian" write in section.

=== 2011 census ===
The 2011 United Kingdom census recorded 1,451,862 residents of Indian, 1,174,983 of Pakistani, 451,529 of Bangladeshi, 433,150 of Chinese, and 861,815 of "Other Asian" ethnicity, making a total Asian British population of 4,373,339 (6.9 per cent of the total population), excluding people of mixed ethnicity.

The 2011 population represented a 1,794,513 increase on the 2001 United Kingdom census figures. All five of the subcategories (Indian, Pakistani, Bangladeshi, Chinese, and Other Asian) rose in their own right, representing both outright population growth, as well as increased demographic share of the UK's total population from 4.4% to 6.9%.

Census category	Population (2001)	Percentage (2001)	Population (2011)	Percentage (2011)
Indian	1,053,411	1.8%	1,451,862	▲2.3%
Pakistani	747,285	1.3%	1,174,983	▲1.9%
Bangladeshi	283,063	0.5%	451,529	▲0.7%
Chinese	247,403	0.4%	433,150	▲0.7%
Other Asian	247,664	0.4%	861,815	▲1.4%
(United Kingdom) Total: Asian British	2,578,826	4.4%	4,373,339	▲6.9%

=== Birthplace ===
In terms of birthplace, the first four categories of "Asian / Asian British" people are vastly represented by births in the United Kingdom and the corresponding national-based category (E.g. China and "Asian / Asian British: Chinese"). The following birthplace figures cover the region of England and Wales, which constitute 94.7 percent of the UK's Asian British statistics:

- For the British Indian category, 606,298 (42.9 percent) were born in the United Kingdom, and 579,521 (41 percent) were born in India, accounting for 83.9 percent of the group.
- In the British Pakistani category, 631,171 (56.1 percent) were born in the UK, and 443,414 (39.4 percent) were born in Pakistan, accounting for 95.5 percent of the group.
- For the British Bangladeshi category, 232,089 (51.9 percent) were born in the UK, and 202,626 (45.3 percent) were born in Bangladesh, accounting for 97.1 percent of the group.
- In the British Chinese category, 93,164 (23.7 percent) were born in the UK, and 209,104 (53.2 percent) were born in China and its special administrative regions, accounting for 76.9 percent of the group. The break down of which was 139,723 in China (35.5 percent), 67,761 in Hong Kong (17.2 percent) and 1,620 in Macao (0.4 percent).
- In the Other Asian category, 207,319 (24.8 percent) were born in the UK, and then with significant births in many diverse nations, mainly in Asia. For example, in the 2011 census, countries of birth with significant representation (over 10,000 births) were recorded across different regions of Asia. In alphabetical order, these included two nations in East Asia (Japan and South Korea), four in South Asia (India, Nepal, Pakistan and Sri Lanka), four in Southeast Asia (Malaysia, Philippines, Thailand and Vietnam), and two nations in West Asia (Iran and Iraq).

In 2001, the ONS designated the "Main countries of birth of Other Asian group" (the 10 places of birth with highest recorded figures), which, in descending order of population, were: United Kingdom, Sri Lanka, Iran, India, Iraq, Mauritius, Pakistan, Kenya, Nepal and Yemen. As updated a decade later by the Office for National Statistics, the 2011 United Kingdom census recorded the following population figures for the "Asian / Asian British: Other" group by birthplace:

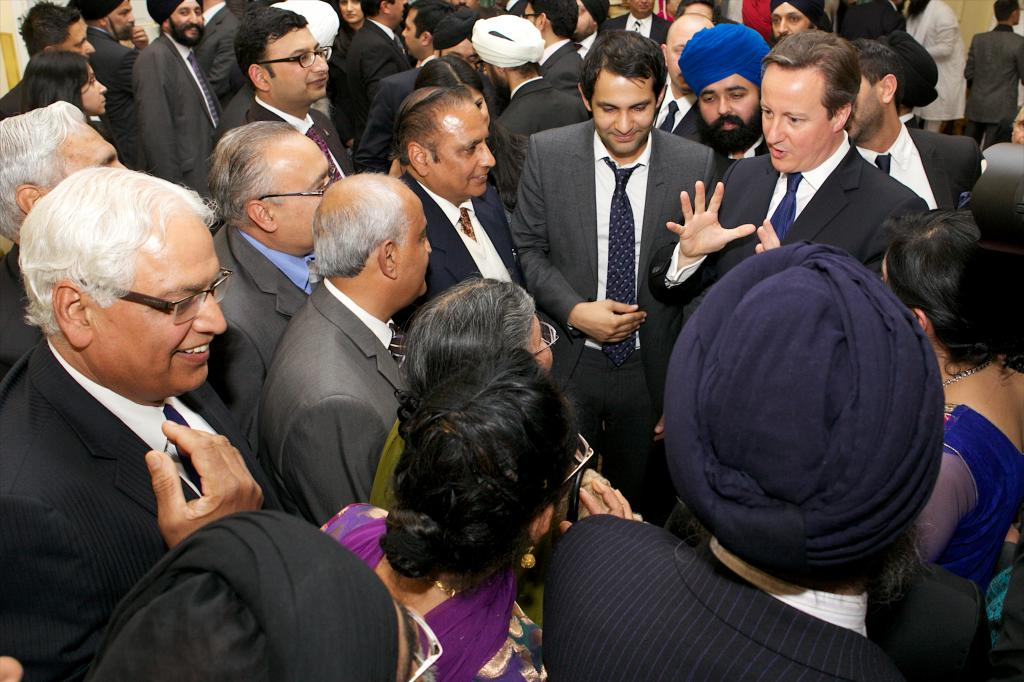
Members of the Asian community with the then prime minister David Cameron in 2014

"Asian / Asian British: Other" population by birth in England and Wales (2011)
Region	ONS	Country	Population	Percentage
Northwest Europe	926	United Kingdom	207,319	24.8%
South Asia	144	Sri Lanka	112,511	13.5%
Southeast Asia	608	Philippines	104,075	12.5%
South Asia	004	Afghanistan	48,776	5.8%
South Asia	524	Nepal	44,243	5.3%
Southeast Asia	764	Thailand	31,135	3.7%
East Asia	392	Japan	28,137	3.4%
West Asia	364	Iran	27,460	3.3%
South Asia	356	India	27,061	3.2%
East Africa	480	Mauritius	17,069	2.0%
Asian British: Other	Not applicable	Not applicable	861,815	1.5%

ONS = Office for National Statistics, coding index.

=== Employment ===
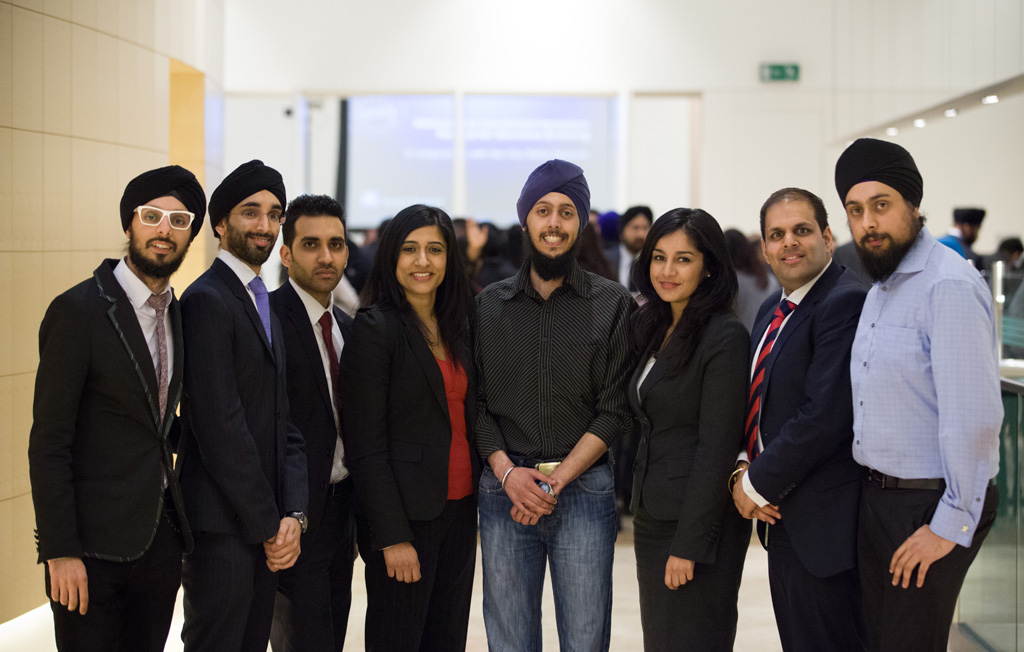
British Asian professionals at a networking event in the City of London

The unemployment rate among Indian men was only slightly higher than that for White British or White Irish men, 7 per cent compared with 5 per cent for the other two groups. On the other hand, Pakistanis have higher unemployment rates of 13–14%, and Bangladeshis have one of the highest rates, around 23%. Some surveys also revealed the Indian unemployment rate to be 6–7% Persons of Indian or mixed Indian origin are more likely than White British to have university degrees, whereas Pakistanis and Bangladeshis are less likely. With the exception of Bangladeshi women, every other group of South Asians, have higher attendance at university than the national average. GCSE pass rates have been rising for all South Asians.

In the UK South Asian population has higher rates of unemployment compared to the White-British population, and number of 16 to 64 year old's who were employed, by ethnicity showed Indians overall had the same ratio in employment as White-British at 76%. However those from Pakistani, Bangladeshi backgrounds have far lower rates in employment at 57%. The gap between men and women was biggest in the combined Pakistani and Bangladeshi ethnic group, where 75% of men and 39% of women were employed compared to 80% of men and 73% of women amongst White-British.

As of 2020, citizens of India and the Philippines are the largest foreign-national groups of National Health Service workers.

=== Ethnoregion ===
South Asian ethnic groups mostly originate from a few select places in South Asia, these are known as place of origins. East Asian ethnic groups are particularly represented by the Han Chinese in the United Kingdom. British Indians tend to originate mainly from the two Indian States, Punjab and Gujarat. Evidence from Bradford and Birmingham have shown, Pakistanis originate largely from the Mirpur District in Azad Kashmir. The second largest ethnic group of British Pakistanis are the Punjabi people, largely from Attock District of Punjab followed by Pashtuns and other ethnic groups from the districts of Nowshera, Peshawar and Ghazi in province of Khyber Pakhtunkhwa. In the London Borough of Waltham Forest there are substantial numbers of Pakistani people originating from Jhelum, Punjab. Studies have shown 95 per cent of British Bangladeshis originate from the Sylhet Division, located in the Northeastern part of Bangladesh. British Chinese people originate primarily from former British colonies, such as Hong Kong, but also from areas of Southeast Asia, where they were already diasporic populations.

There have been three waves of Hindu migration to the United Kingdom. The first wave was before India's independence in 1947. The second wave occurred in the 1970s mainly from East Africa. The later communities included those from Guyana, Trinidad and Tobago, Mauritius and Fiji. The last wave of migration began in the 1990s and included Tamil refugees from Sri Lanka and professionals including doctors and software engineers from India.

=== Language ===
Chinese Britons speak the Mandarin, Cantonese, Min, and Hakka languages. The language spoken by Indians are Punjabi, Gujarati, Kutchi, Hindustani (Hindi–Urdu), Bengali, Tamil, Telugu and Malayalam. People from Pakistan speak Urdu, Punjabi, Mirpuri, Hindko (dialects of Punjabi), Sindhi, Kashmiri, Pashto and Saraiki. Gujaratis who emigrated from India and East Africa speak Gujarati, Hindi, and Kutchi (a dialect of Sindhi), while a sizeable number of Gujarati Muslims speak Urdu for religious and cultural reasons. Bangladeshis mainly speak Sylheti Bengali and other dialects of Bengali. People from Sri Lanka speak Tamil and Sinhala. Speakers of different dialects mainly refer to their dialects as the main language, for example Sylheti Bengali speakers refer to the Sylheti dialect as just "Bengali" and Mirpuri speakers sometimes say they speak Punjabi. The reason for this is that for any given ethnic community, their region-specific dialect is the normative form of the language used.

=== Religion ===
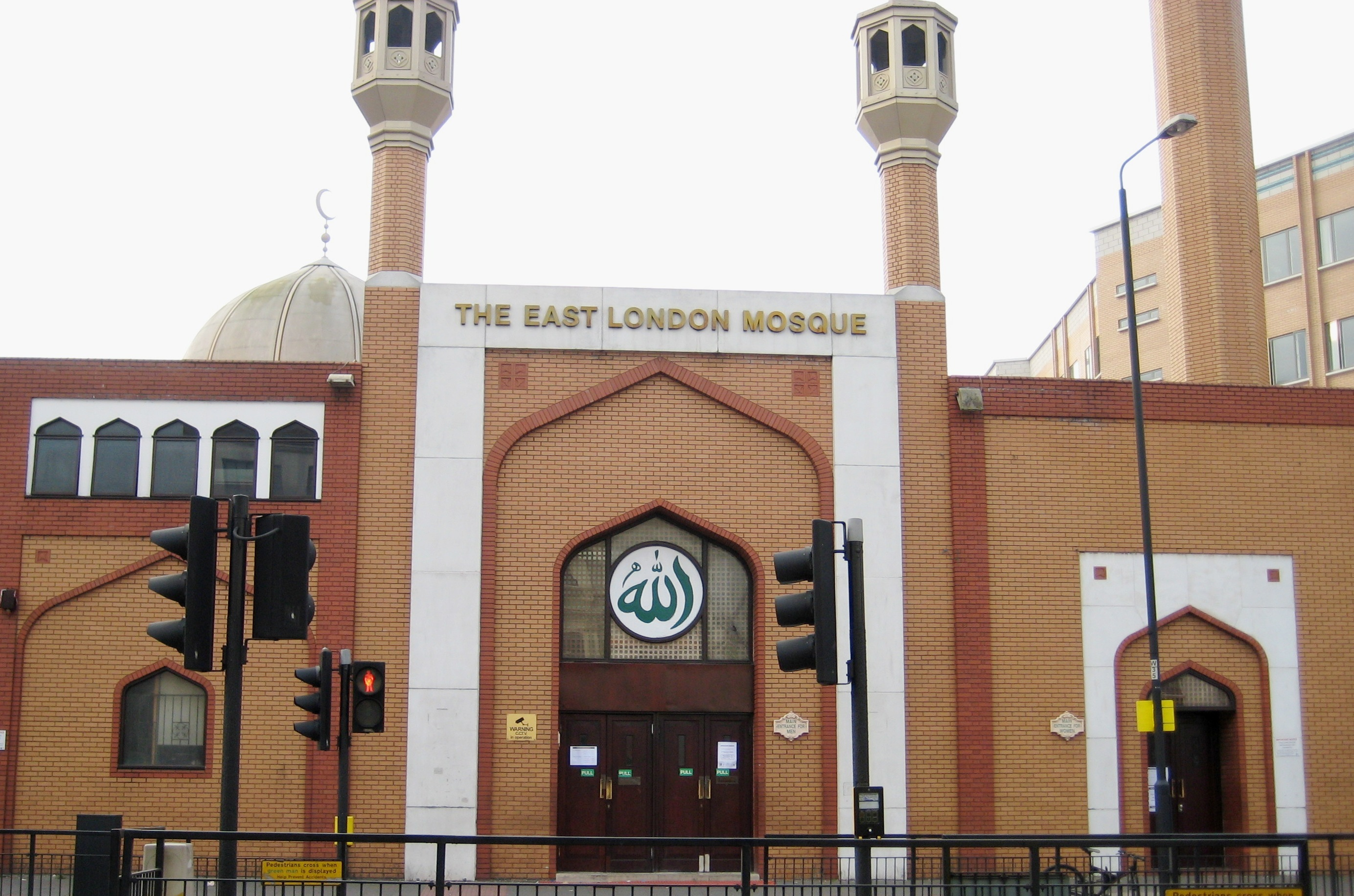
The East London Mosque, is one of the largest mosques in Europe, and the biggest in the UK

Asian Britons have significant numbers of adherents to various major religions. Based on 2011 census figures for England and Wales (94.7 percent of UK statistics), Muslims account for 43% of the group, while Hindus make up over 18%, and Christians almost 11%. Sikhs constitute nearly 9% of British Asians, and 3.5% are Buddhists.

British Chinese are mainly irreligious, with 55% of the population subscribing to no religion, 19% Christians and 12% Buddhists. British Pakistanis and Bangladeshis tend to be religiously homogeneous, with Muslims accounting for 92% of each group while their counterparts of Indian and Sri Lankan origin are more religiously diverse, with 55% Hindus, 29% Sikhs, and 15% Muslims. British Gujaratis are predominantly Hindu, belonging to various caste organizations, with large minorities of Muslims, Jains, and smaller numbers of Christians and Zoroastrians. Notable religious buildings are the East London Mosque, London Central Mosque, Birmingham Central Mosque, Baitul Futuh Mosque, BAPS Shri Swaminarayan Mandir London, Bradford Lakshmi Narayan Hindu Temple, Shikharbandi Jain Derasar in Potters Bar, Gurdwara Sri Guru Singh Sabha in Southall and Guru Nanak Darbar Gurdwara in Gravesend.

The publication of Salman Rushdie's novel The Satanic Verses in 1988 caused major controversy. Muslims condemned the book for blasphemy. On 2 December 1988 the book was publicly burned at a demonstration in Bolton attended by 7,000 Muslims, followed by a similar demonstration and book-burning in Bradford on 14 January 1989. In 1989 Ayatollah Ruhollah Khomeini of Iran issued a fatwa ordering Muslims to kill Rushdie.

Britain is also home of notable Asian religious leaders and scholars. Some of them are Mirza Masroor Ahmad (Caliph of the Ahmadiyya Community), Sheikh Abdul Qayum (one of the best known scholars in Europe and Chief Imam of East London Mosque), Abu Yusuf Riyadh ul Haq (Khateeb of Birmingham Central Mosque), Dr. Mahmudul Hasan (Khateeb of Essex Mosque), Abdur Rahman Madani (Chairman of Global Eid Trust and Chief Imam of Darul Ummah Mosque), Faiz-ul-Aqtab Siddiqi (principal of Hijaz College), Ajmal Masroor (Imam and Liberal Democrats politician) and Pramukh Swami Maharaj (fifth spiritual successor of Hindu Swaminarayan).

== History in Britain ==
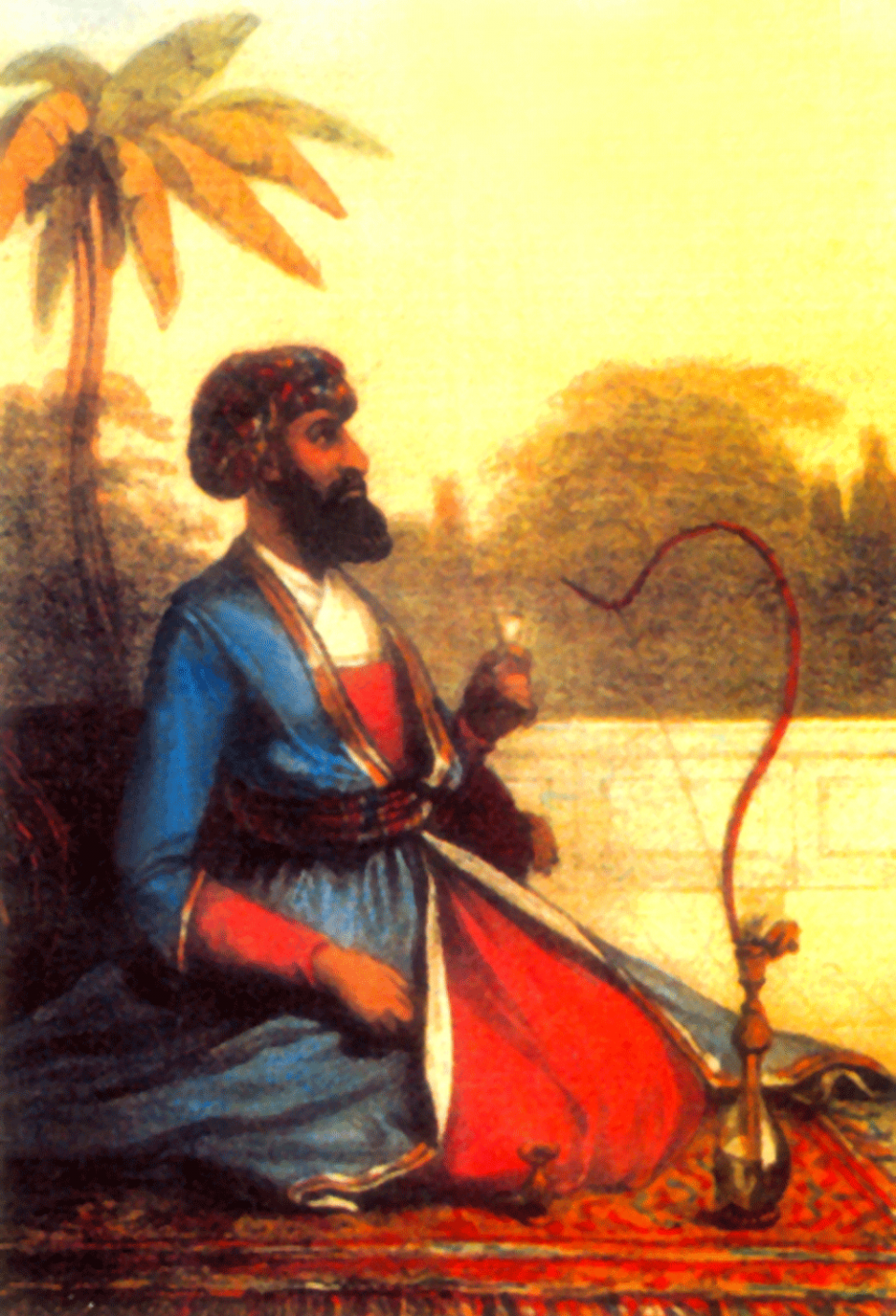
Munshi I'tisam-ud-Din was the first South Asian to travel and live in Europe, and write about his experiences

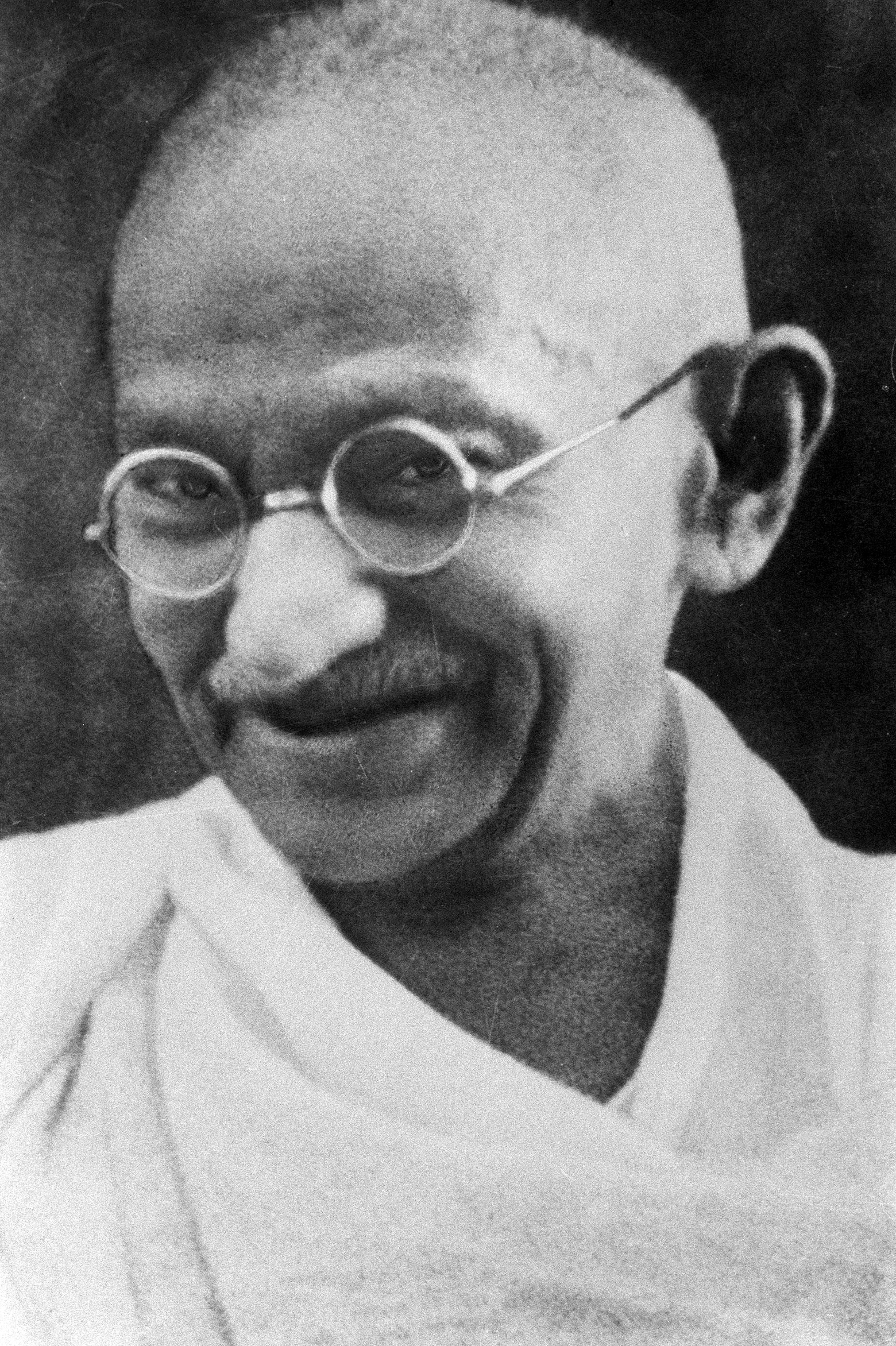
Mohandas Karamchand Gandhi, who studied in England, played a pivotal role in leading the Indian independence movement

The earliest date at which South Asians settled in Great Britain is unclear. If the Romany are included, then the first recorded arrivals were in the early 16th century. DNA surveys have linked Romanies to present-day South Asian populations and the Romani language is a member of the Indo-Aryan language family. Romanies are believed to have begun travelling westward around 1000 CE, and have mixed with Middle Eastern and European populations over many centuries. Romani began arriving in sizeable numbers in parts of Western Europe in the 16th century. The Romani who settled in Britain are sometimes known as Romanichal, but there are several subgroups within the Romani population of the United Kingdom today.

The first educated South Asian to travel to Europe and live in Britain was I'tisam-ud-Din, a Bengali Muslim cleric, munshi and diplomat to the Mughal Empire who arrived in 1765 with his servant Muhammad Muqim during the reign of King George III. He wrote of his experiences and travels in his Persian book, Shigurf-nama-i-Wilayat ('Wonderous Chronicle of Europe'). This is also the earliest record of literature by a British Asian. Also during the reign of George III, the hookah-bardar (hookah servant/preparer) of James Achilles Kirkpatrick was said to have robbed and cheated Kirkpatrick, making his way to England and stylising himself as the Prince of Sylhet. The man was waited upon by the British Prime Minister William Pitt the Younger, and then dined with the Duke of York before presenting himself in front of the King.

=== Lascars ===
When the Portuguese explorer Vasco da Gama arrived in Calicut, India in 1498, he established the first European-Asian sea route (commonly called the Cape Route), opening up direct maritime passage between South Asia and Europe. An extension of this route, devised by the Dutch explorer Hendrik Brouwer in 1611 and known as the Brouwer Route, subsequently found a new waterway to Southeast Asia.

In the following centuries, the United Kingdom, and its predecessor states, utilised these sea routes to form the British Empire. Capitilising on their growing naval dominance among the other European powers, the British colonised the coastal areas in the West, South, Southeast and East of the continent, creating dozens of British colonies and protectorates in Asia. The administrators of the British Empire termed Asian labourers working for them coolies, of which lascars were considered the maritime equivalent.

Lascars were sailors or seamen from many different ethnic backgrounds. The term was sometimes used to specifically refer to a sailor of any Asian ancestry, however there were also African lascars recorded in Britain. Of the Asian lascars, Austronesian Malay people, from Southeast Asia, formed a significant part of the lascar population settling in, and sailing to and from Britain. From East Asia, Japanese and Chinese seamen were often operating as lascars for British ships and trading companies. From South Asia, Indians made up a huge proportion of these sea crews, particularly in the East India Company's earliest decades of operation. Parsees (who originate from Persia, West Asia) and Luso-Asians of mixed Portuguese and Indian heritage, also came from South Asia to work as lascars. From West Asia, Armenians formed part of diverse lascar crews, and Yemenis increasingly served as lascar sailors and militiamen after the completion of the Suez Canal in 1869, going on to open businesses, like boarding houses, in port cities such as Cardiff and South Shields. There were also the Ceylonese (Sri Lankans) and the Bengalis who also took part in sailing.

=== Post–World War II migration ===
Following the Second World War and the breakup of the British Empire, South Asian migration to the UK increased through the 1950s and 1960s from Pakistan (including present-day Bangladesh), India and Sri Lanka (who are all members of the Commonwealth). Immigrants from former Caribbean colonies (including Indo-Caribbeans) were also moving to Britain.

Although this immigration was continuous, several distinct phases can be identified:

- Manual workers, mainly from Pakistan, were recruited to fulfill the labour shortage that resulted from World War II. These included Anglo-Indians who were recruited to work on the railways as they had done in India.
- Workers mainly from the Punjab region of India and Pakistan arrived in the late 1950s and 1960s. Many worked in the foundries of the English Midlands and a large number worked at Heathrow Airport in west London. This created an environment to where the next generation of families did not lose their identity as easily. An example would be Southall which is populated by many Sikhs.
- During the same time, medical staff from the Indian subcontinent were recruited for the newly formed National Health Service. These people were targeted as the British had established medical schools in the Indian subcontinent which conformed to the British standards of medical training.

Bengali social reformer and founder of the All-India Seamen's Federation, Aftab Ali's work is recognised to have helped thousands of Asian lascars to migrate, settle and find employment in Britain. He organised rallies and meetings with the likes of the Trades Union Congress. He encouraged lascars and seamen to remain and settle in the United Kingdom. In the 1950s, he founded the Overseas Seamen's Welfare Association which campaigned distressed seamen and their families to be granted British passports. Ali also played an instrumental role in the opening of a passport office in his own home in Sylhet.

==== Asian migration from East Africa ====
Beginning around 1964 Africanization policies in East Africa prompted the arrival of Asians with British passports from Kenya, Uganda and Tanzania. At first these were the people employed in government and administrative roles, but this was expanded to include those Asians engaged in commerce. The movement was called the "Exodus".

In 1972, all Asians were expelled from Uganda by the controversial figure Idi Amin who was president of Uganda at the time. Those holding British passports came to Britain. Many such displaced people who were predominantly of Gujarati origins had left behind successful businesses and vast commercial empires in Uganda, but built up their lives all over again in Britain, starting from scratch. Although, since the Asians had already experienced discrimination in Uganda, they expected it in England as well. Despite hardships, some of these "twice-over" migrants became retailers, while others found suitable employment in white-collar professions.

The Commonwealth Immigrants Act 1962 and Immigration Act 1971 largely restricted any further primary immigration, although family members of already-settled migrants were still allowed. In addition, much of the subsequent growth in the South Asian community has come from the births of second and third-generation South Asian Britons.

=== Post–Brexit migration ===
After Brexit, EU nationals working in the health and social care sector were replaced by migrants from non-EU countries such as India. About 250,000 people came from India, 90,000 from China and 83,000 from Pakistan in 2023.

In 2021, the government launched a scheme for Hongkongers, with more than 200,000 Hong Kong residents immigrating to the UK.

== Notable contributions ==
=== Film, television and entertainment ===
Several British Asians have broken into the UK film industry, as well as Hollywood, and the U.S. film industry at large; starring in high-grossing box office films, including major film series, and receiving subsequent international recognition and media attention. In television, prominent roles in American sitcoms, series, and long-running British soap operas, such as Coronation Street, EastEnders, Emmerdale and Hollyoaks, have all had a number of Asian characters portrayed by British actors of Asian heritage.

Tsai Chin, the first British Asian actress to play a Bond girl, appeared in 1967's You Only Live Twice and the 2006 re-make of Casino Royale. Burt Kwouk, who appeared in over fifty films, including three of the James Bond film series, received an OBE for services to drama in 2010. Art Malik had notable roles in The Jewel in the Crown and The Living Daylights, and Sir Ben Kingsley (born Krishna Pandit Bhanji) is one of Britain's most acclaimed and well-known performers. Kingsley is one of few actors to have won all four major motion picture acting awards, receiving Oscar, BAFTA, Golden Globe and Screen Actors Guild awards throughout his career, including the Academy Award for Best Actor for his performance in Gandhi (1982).

The actor Dev Patel, who played the role of Anwar Kharral in the teen drama series Skins, portrayed the leading role in Danny Boyle's Slumdog Millionaire, for which he received several awards and was nominated for the 2009 BAFTA Award for Best Leading Actor. Parminder Nagra, who played a prominent role in the US TV series ER, starred in successful British film Bend It Like Beckham (2002). The actor Naveen Andrews plays the role of Sayid Jarrah in the popular US TV series Lost, and also had a prominent role in the award-winning film The English Patient (1996). Kunal Nayyar plays the character of Raj Koothrappali in the popular US sitcom, The Big Bang Theory.

Gemma Chan and Benedict Wong have featured in the Marvel Cinematic Universe franchise. Chan has had two starring roles in both 2019's Captain Marvel and Eternals (2021), making her the first actress to portray separate characters within the cinematic universe. Wong, who has also appeared in two Ridley Scott films (Prometheus and The Martian), first appeared for a Marvel production in 2016's Doctor Strange, twice reprising the role for Avengers: Infinity War (2018) and Endgame (2019), the latter of which is the highest grossing release in film history. Riz Ahmed has starred in both the Bourne film series and Star Wars saga, appearing in anthology film Rogue One. Star Wars, Marvel's The Avengers, the Bourne and James Bond film series are some of the highest-grossing film franchises of all time.

British Indians Sacha Dhawan, Amber Rose Revah, Rish Shah have played notable roles in Marvel TV shows like Iron Fist, Punisher and Ms Marvel. British Pakistani Jay Ali would earn universal claim for his role in Daredevil. British Syrian Laith Nakli appears in Ms Marvel.

British Bangladeshi Jan Uddin appears in Marvel Agents of Shield and becomes among the first British Asian actor to appear in a Live Action Anime adaptation with his role in Cowboy Bepop. Following this British Lebanese Taz Skylar and British Sri Lankan Charithra Chandran appear in the Live Action adaptation of the Anime One Piece.

Theatre company RIFCO Arts has been producing and touring productions based on the British Asian experience since 1999.

=== Art and design ===
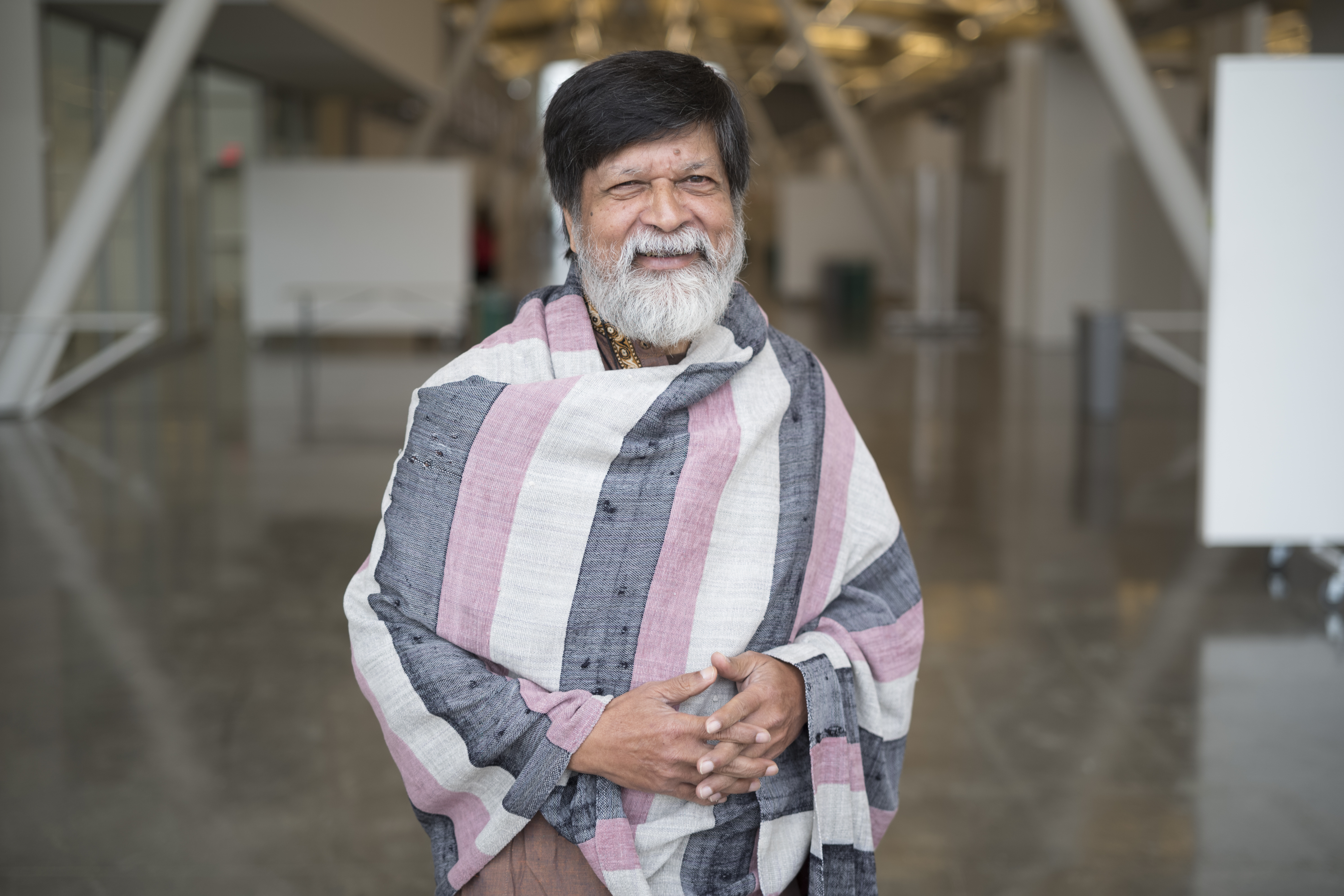
Shahidul Alam was one of the persons of the year selected by Time magazine in 2018

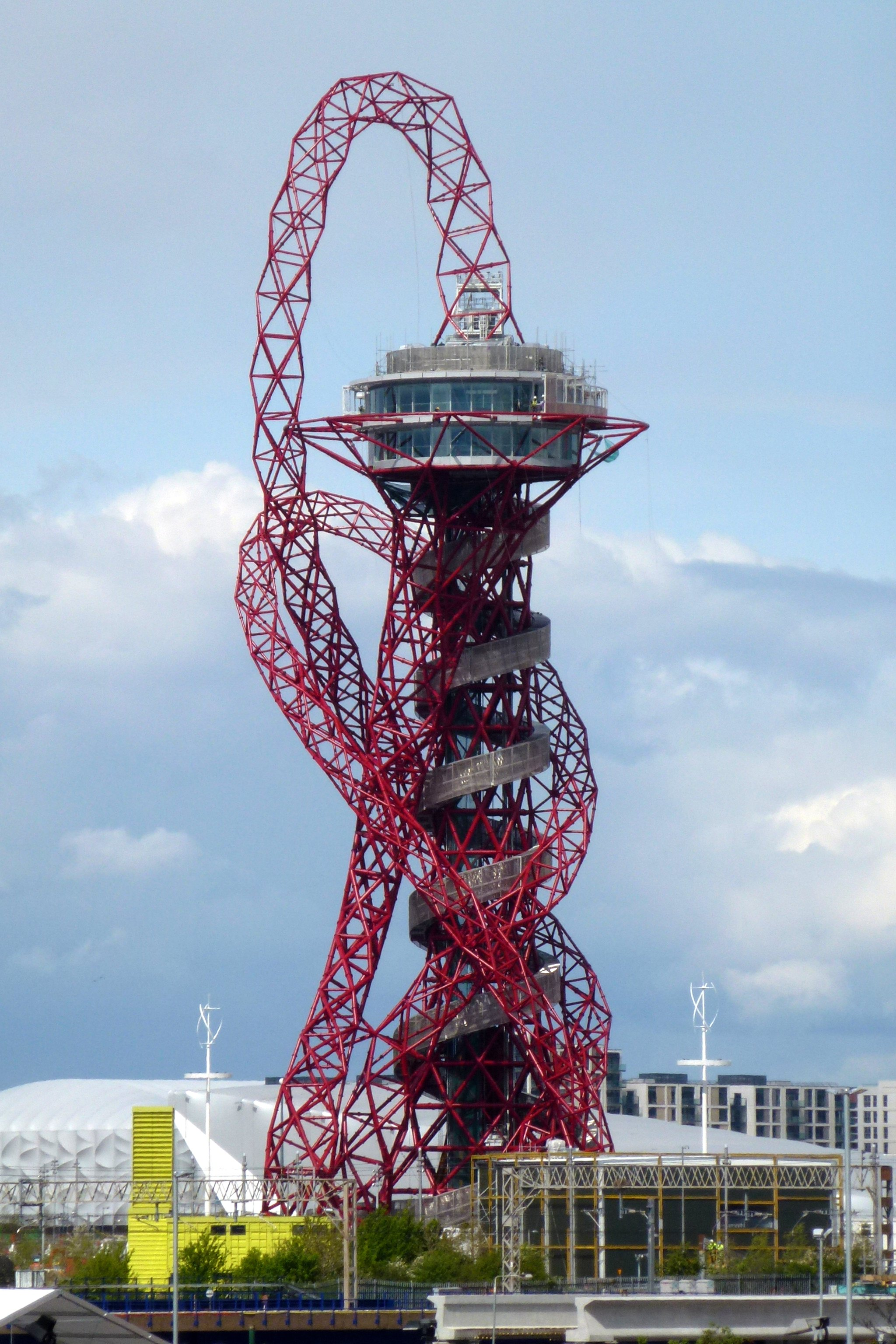
ArcelorMittal Orbit, London Olympic Park, designated by the Indian Anish Kapoor

Art historian Alice Correia identifies the exhibition, The Other Story: Afro-Asian Artists in Post-War Britain, organised by Pakistani-British artist and curator Rasheed Araeen in 1989, as a key factor in establishing art-establishment recognition of British Asian art and artists.

The Panchayat Collective, established in 1988 by Shaheen Merali and Al-An deSouza, with Bhajan Hunjan, Symrath Patti and Shanti Thomain, brought together "politically Black" artists and curators, many of whom were of South Asian origin, in an effort to preserve and celebrate work that had been marginalised by mainstream galleries and art buyers.

Anish Kapoor is an Indian-born British sculptor. Born in Mumbai, Kapoor has lived and worked in London since the early 1970s when he moved to study art, first at the Hornsey College of Art and later at the Chelsea College of Art and Design. Kapoor received the Turner Prize in 1991.

Poulomi Desai, born in Hackney, London is a photographer and sound artist working with noise and electricity since the 1980s. She is an Oram Awards winner and curator of Usurp Art.

Born in London and of Asian origin, Shezad Dawood became known for this work in various media in the early 2000s. Also born in London and of Pakistani origin, Haroon Mirza emerged as an artist in the late 2000s. Best known for his sculptural installations that generate sound, Mirza was awarded the Silver Lion for the Most Promising Artist at the 54th Venice Biennale in 2011.

Shahidul Alam is a Bangladeshi photojournalist, teacher and social activist. He has been a photographer for more than forty years and "his photographs have been published in almost every major western media outlet". Saiman Miah is an architectural designer and graphic designer who designed one of the two £5 commemorative coins for the 2012 London Summer Olympics.

Osman Yousefzada, of Afghan and Pakistani heritage, is an artist and fashion designer who was referred to as the "re-inventor of the Little Black Dress" by Vogue magazine in 2008. He had eventually become a renowned dresser, with several famous female celebrities wearing dresses created by Yousefzada. He also designed a large piece of public art at Selfridges Birmingham, in his home city, which was on display during the 2022 Commonwealth Games.

=== Literature ===
Well-known South Asian writers include Muhammad Mojlum Khan, Abdur Rouf Choudhury, Aminul Hoque, Shahida Rahman, H.S. Bhabra, Salman Rushdie, Ghulam Murshid, Tahir Shah, Gurinder Chadha, Nazrin Choudhury, Rekha Waheed, Hanif Kureishi, Monica Ali, Meera Syal, Gautam Malkani, Bali Rai and Raman Mundair.

=== Music ===
Since the 1970s, South Asian performers and writers have achieved significant mainstream cultural success. The first South Asian musician to gain wide popularity in the UK and worldwide fame was Queen lead singer Freddie Mercury, born Farrokh Bulsara in Zanzibar, East Africa, to parents of Parsi descent from Bombay (now Mumbai). In 2006, Time Asia magazine voted him as one of the most influential South Asians in the past 60 years. At around the same time, music producer, composer and songwriter Biddu gained worldwide fame for a number of hit songs, including "Kung Fu Fighting" by Carl Douglas and "I Love to Love (But My Baby Loves to Dance)" for Tina Charles. In the 1990s the South Asian artists who gained mainstream success included Apache Indian, whose 1993 single "Boom Shack-A-Lak" was used in many Hollywood movies, and Jas Mann, who headed Babylon Zoo and whose 1996 single "Spaceman" set a UK chart record when it sold 418,000 copies in its first week of release. The most successful South Asian musician in 2008 was the British Tamil artist M.I.A., who was nominated for two Grammy Awards for her single "Paper Planes", and has been nominated for an Academy Award for Best Original Score for "O... Saya", from the Slumdog Millionaire soundtrack.

In 2009, R&B and hip-hop artist, Mumzy Stranger, became the first British Bangladeshi to release a music single; titled "One More Dance". In October 2009, Jay Sean's single "Down" reached the #1 on the Billboard Hot 100 and sold four million copies in the United States, making him the first South Asian-origin solo artist and "the first UK Urban act to top Billboard's Hot 100," "the most successful male UK urban artist in US chart history," and the most successful British male artist in the US charts since Elton John in 1997. A new generation of British Asian musicians have followed such as Raxstar, Bilal and Nish. In the early 2010s, Asian boy band members, Siva Kaneswaran of the Wanted and Zayn Malik of One Direction, have gained considerable mainstream popularity worldwide; the Wanted reached No. 3 on the Billboard Hot 100 with "Glad You Came" while One Direction topped the Billboard 200 with Up All Night. British Bangladeshi YouTuber-turned-rapper Koomz is best known for his breakthrough single "Mariah" which has hit over 10 million streams and views across many platforms and also Number 1 in the Official Asian Music Chart of 2018.

=== Charity and interfaith ===
There is a growing number of young British Asians who are making a mark in the charity and interfaith sectors. A recent example is Onkardeep Singh who became the youngest person of South Asian heritage in 2018 to be awarded an MBE for his interfaith and voluntary works. Saif Uddin Ahmad is a humanitarian and chief executive officer of Al-Khair Foundation. He was formerly the chief executive officer of the UK charities Muslim Aid and Islamic Help, and he also founded the charities Faith Regen foundation, MADE in Europe and Global One 2015. Responsible investment consultant and writer, Niaz Alam was a trustee of the charity War on Want from 2000 to 2007.

=== Religion after the expulsion ===
After the Asians were expelled from Uganda, more religious sites started to emerge in the UK as well. Temples and mosques emerged in repurposed buildings such as churches, meeting houses, and even factories. These spaces gave Asians a place to practice their beliefs and a place for gatherings. Furthermore, these spaces made way for Asian culture to flourish within the UK. For example, Diwali festivities started to draw in many crowds and turned districts into dazzling displays of light and sound.

=== Sports ===
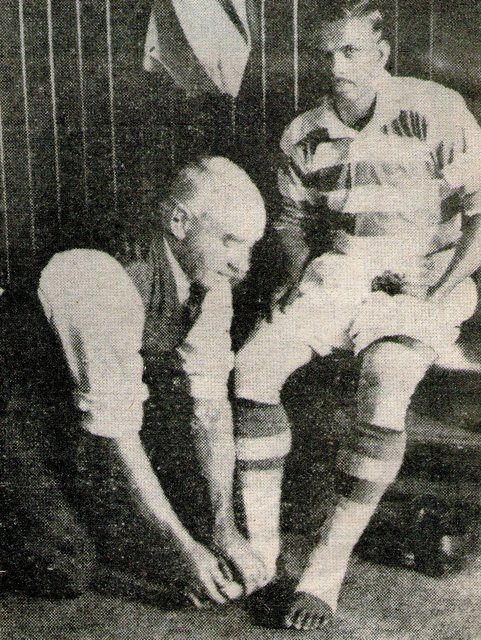
Mohammed Salim, the first South Asian footballer to play for a foreign club. Due to playing in bare feet, he is having them bandaged by Jimmy McMenemy in 1936.

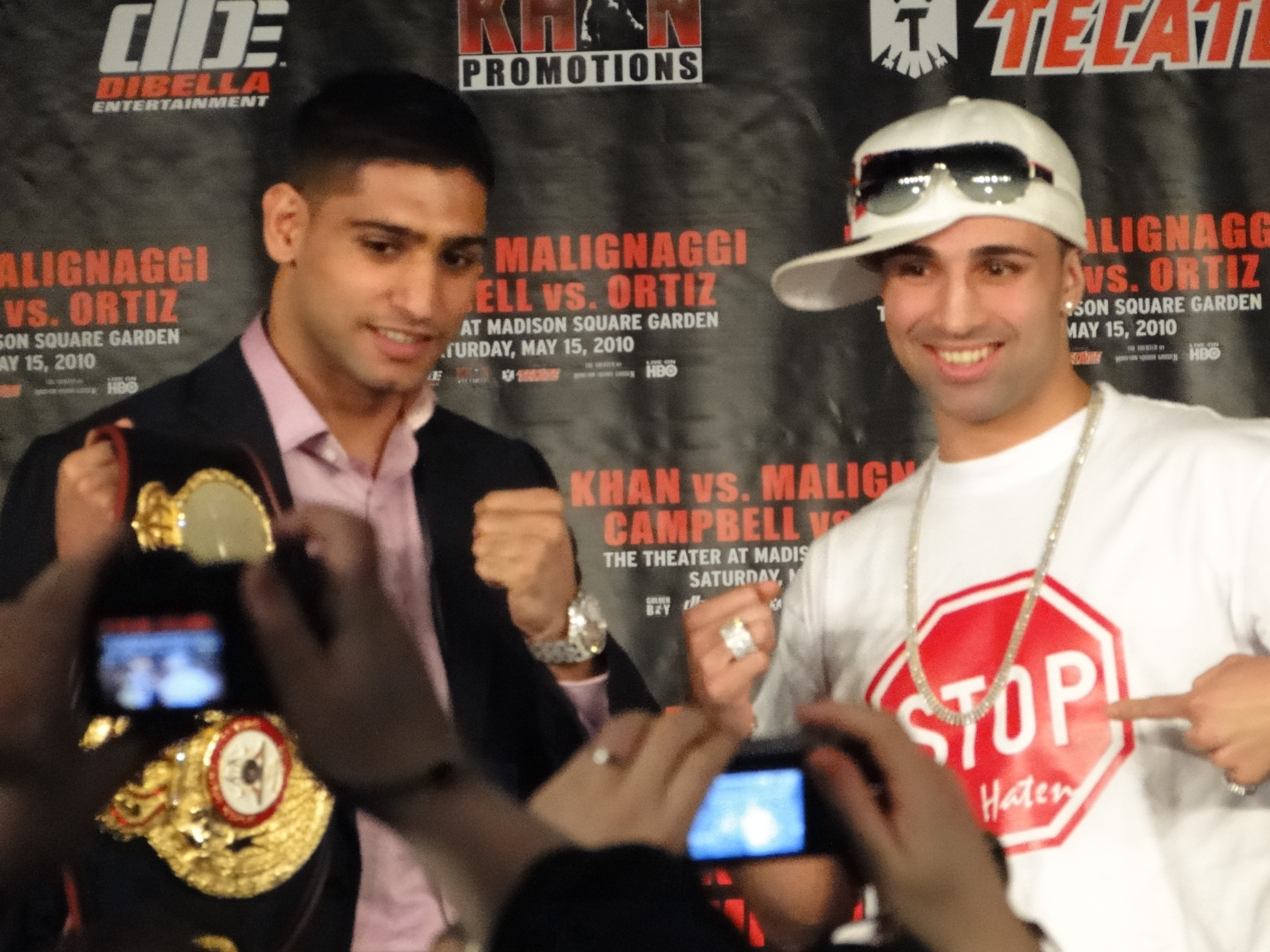
Amir Khan (left), with American boxer Paulie Malignaggi (right)

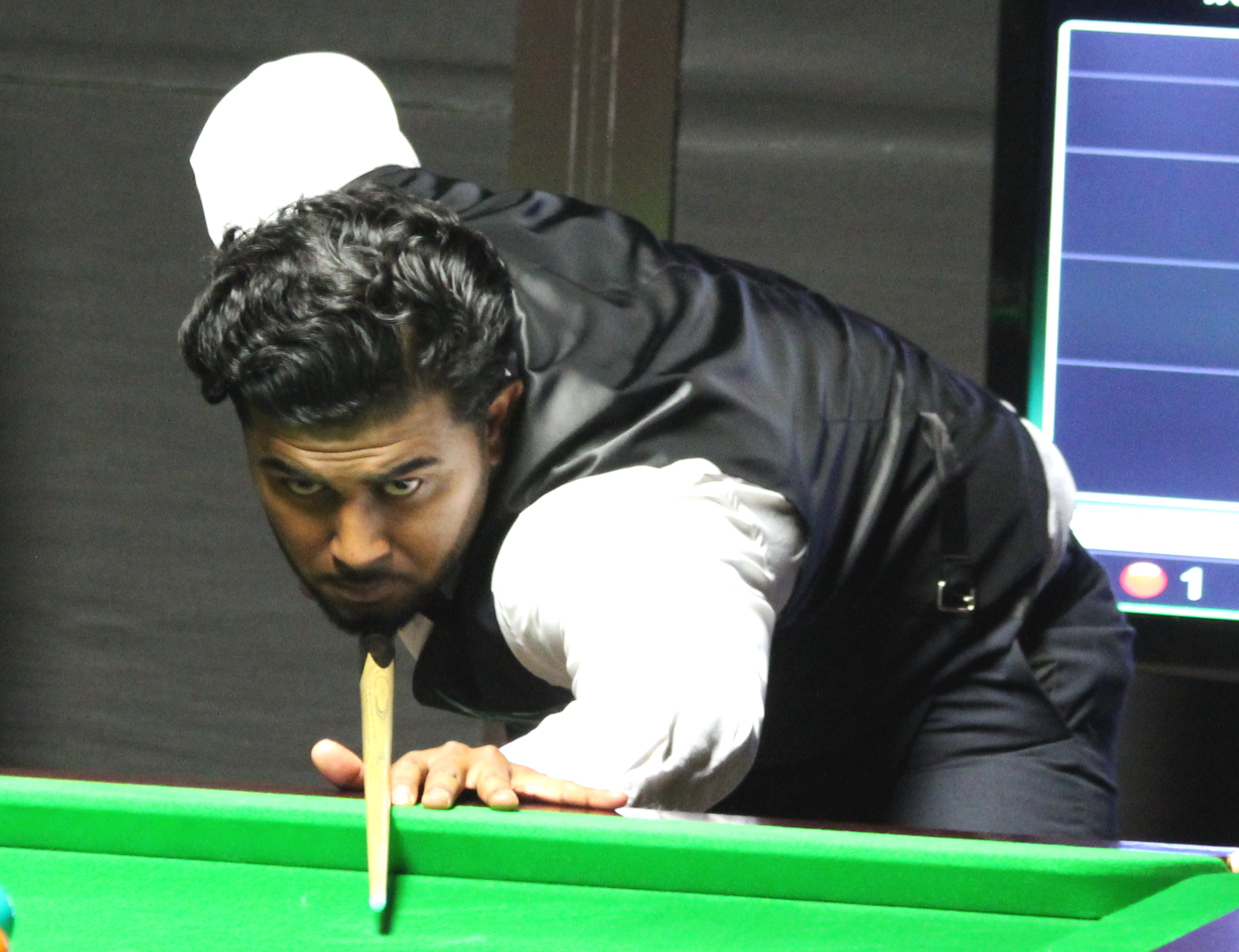
Hammad Miah is a professional snooker player of Bengali origin.

Mohammed Salim of Bengal became the first South Asian to play for a European football club in 1936. In his two appearances for Celtic F.C., he played the entire matches barefoot and scored several goals. Anwar Uddin began his career at West Ham United, where he joined the winning team of the 1999 FA Youth Cup Finals. In May 2015, he was appointed manager of Sporting Bengal United. Aston Villa defender, Neil Taylor and Leicester City midfielder Hamza Choudhury are the first players of Bengali descent to play in the Premier League. Choudhury has also made appearances for the England under-21 team.

Michael Chopra played for the England national under-21 football team and became the first footballer of Indian descent to play and score in the Premier League. In 2006 he scored one of the fastest goals in Premier League history, as Chopra had only been on the pitch for fifteen seconds after coming on as a substitute.

Jawaid Khaliq, the first world champion boxer of Pakistani origin, was born in Nottingham. Amir Khan, born in Bolton, won a silver medal at the 2004 Summer Olympics in Athens and went on to become a world light-welterweight boxing champion. Bulbul Hussain of Whitechapel is a wheelchair rugby player of Bengali origin, and he has been a part of the Great Paralympic Team since 2008.

Just as in South Asia, the most popular sport among the British Asian community is cricket; as much as third of the players of the sport at recreational level are of South Asian descent. This has not translated into equal levels of success professionally however, with only 4.2% of cricketers being of British South Asian descent in first-class cricket across the UK. Regardless, many British South Asians have gone on to represent England in cricket internationally. Nasser Hussain, who was the captain of the England cricket team, was born in Madras, India. Other success stories of the past have included Mark Ramprakash, of Indo-Caribbean descent, Isa Guha, of Bengali descent, and Monty Panesar, of Indian Sikh descent. Currently, Moeen Ali and Adil Rashid are the only players in the England men's squad, both of Pakistani (Mipuri) descent.

Other British Asian sport personalities:

- Haroon Khan
- Vikram Solanki
- Qasim Nisar
- Imran Khan
- Tanveer Ahmed
- Sajid Mahmood
- Saqlain Mushtaq
- Adam Khan
- Dimitri Mascarenhas
- Ravi Bopara
- Kabir Ali
- Owais Shah
- Kadeer Ali
- Hamza Riazuddin
- Min Patel
- Samit Patel
- Riaz Amin
- Adil Rashid
- Zesh Rehman
- Bilal Shafayat
- Harpal Singh
- Anwar Uddin
- Usman Afzaal
- Adnan Ahmed
- Hammad Miah
- Nayan Doshi
- Majid Haq
- Ronnie Irani
- Omer Hussain
- Tosh Masson
- Kash Gill
- Netan Sansara
- Mandip Sehmi
- Rikki Bains
- Rajiv Ouseph
- Ali Jacko
- Bulbul Hussain
- Ruqsana Begum
- Zubair Hoque

=== Celebrities in popular culture ===
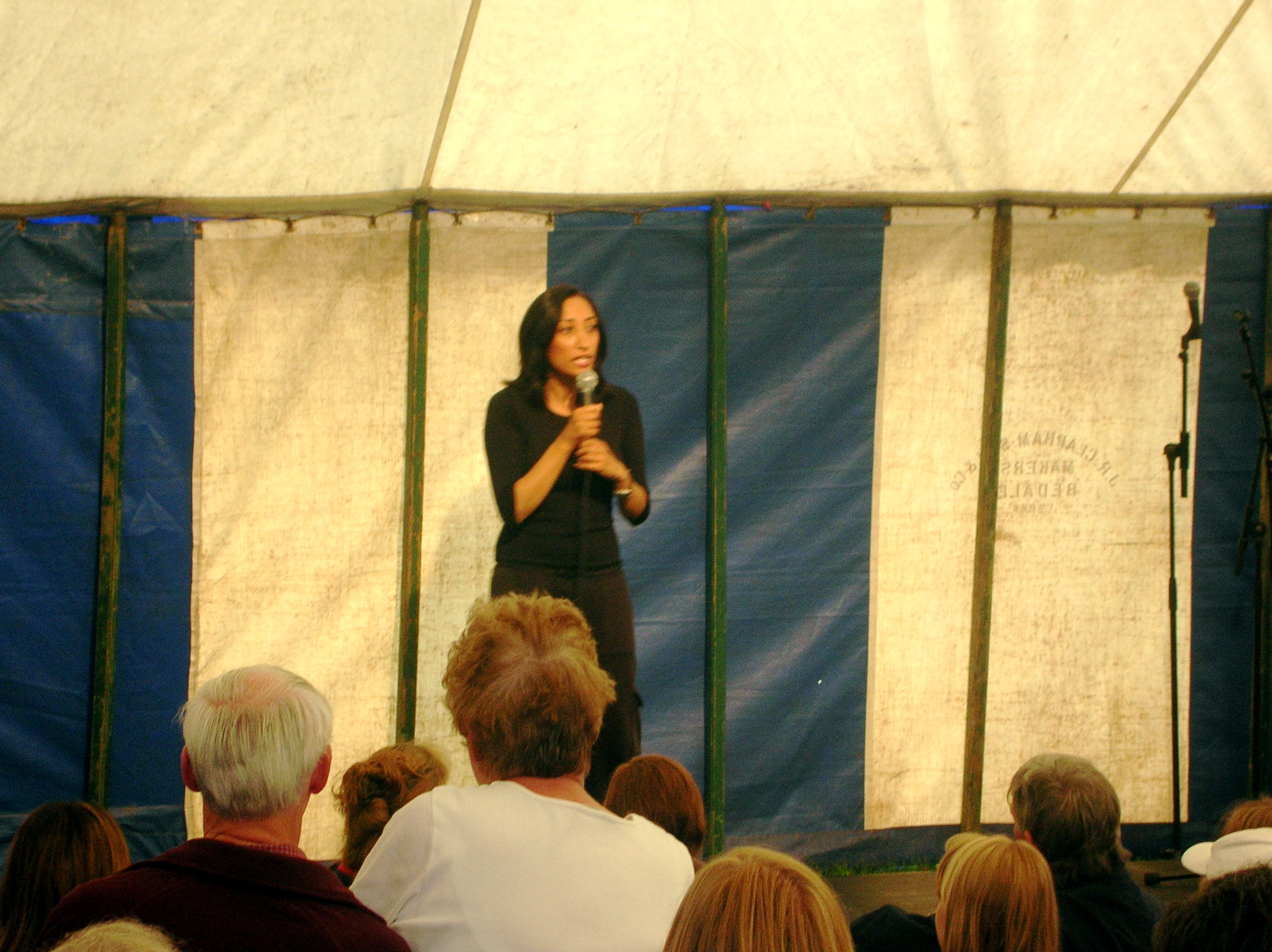
Shazia Mirza is a popular British comedian

The comedians Sanjeev Bhaskar, Meera Syal, Papa CJ and Shazia Mirza are all well-recognised figures in British popular culture. The presenter and match maker of the BBC marriage arranging show Arrange Me a Marriage is a South Asian-Scot Aneela Rahman. Hardeep Singh Kohli is a presenter, reporter and comedian on British television and radio. British Bangladeshi, Pakistani and Indian contestants have appeared on The Apprentice including Syed Ahmed, Tre Azam, Lohit Kalburgi, Ghazal Asif, Shazia Wahab, Sara Dhada, and most notably Saira Khan, who is now a British TV presenter. The broadcasters Daljit Dhaliwal, Krishnan Guru-Murthy and Samira Ahmed are known for working on Channel 4 News. The fashion model Neelam Gill has worked with Burberry, Abercrombie & Fitch and appeared in Vogue magazine.

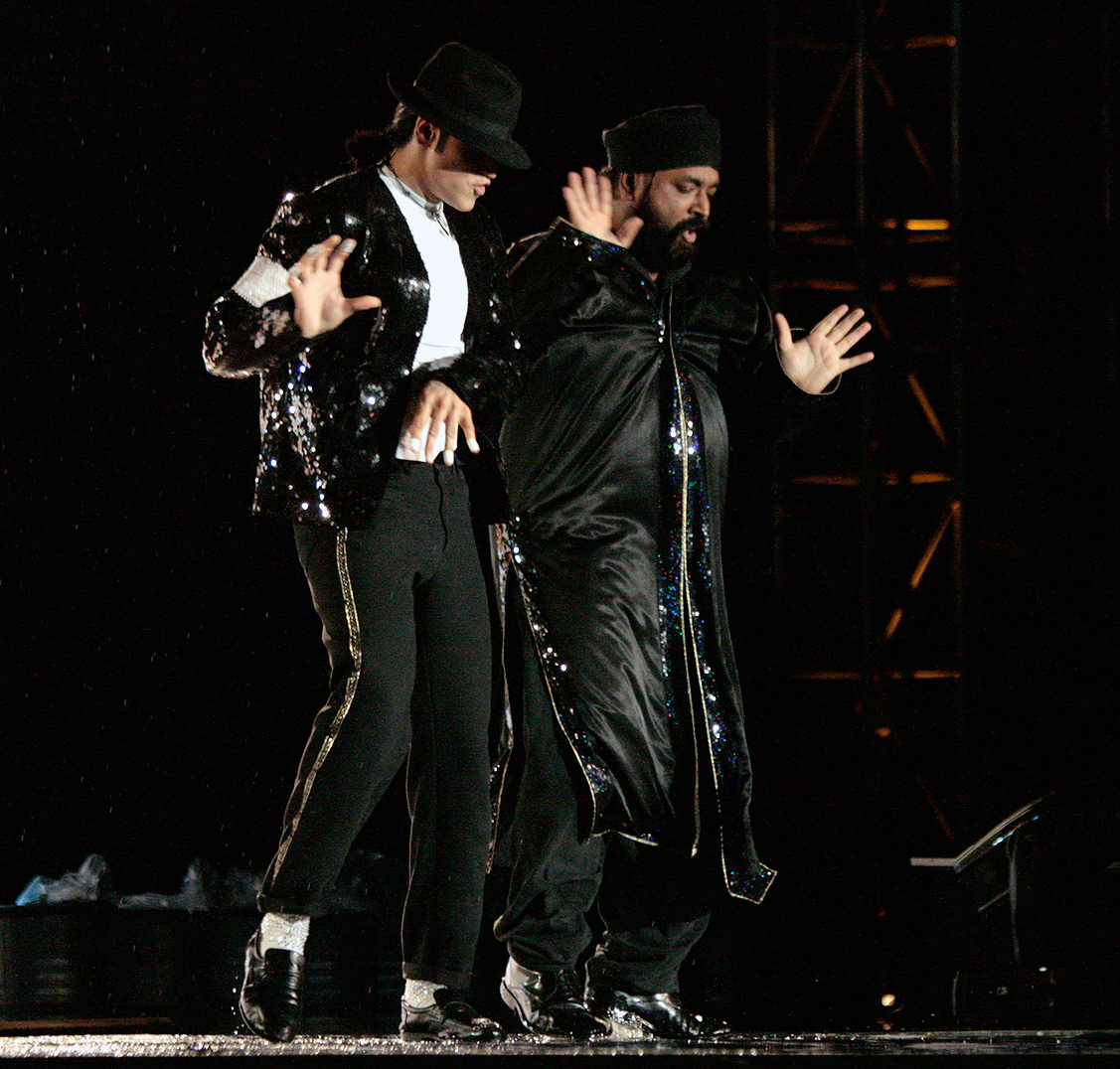
The award-winning dance act Signature involved a British Pakistani and a British Indian

In 2008, in the second series of reality television Britain's Got Talent, one of the country's most successful reality television shows, the South Asian dance duo Signature, consisting of Suleman Mirza (a British Pakistani) and Madhu Singh (a British Indian) performing a fusion of Michael Jackson and Bhangra music and dance styles, came second on the show.

Humza Arshad and Ali Shahalom are well known British Asian comedians for their YouTube careers which normally consists of stereotyping Pakistani, Bangladeshi and Muslim culture. In 2011, one of Humza Arshad's video was the seventh most viewed on YouTube in Europe. British Bangladeshi comedian Ali Shahalom, along with British Pakistani comedian Aatif Nawaz, starred on BBC's first ever British Muslim sketch show, Muzlamic.

== Cultural influence ==
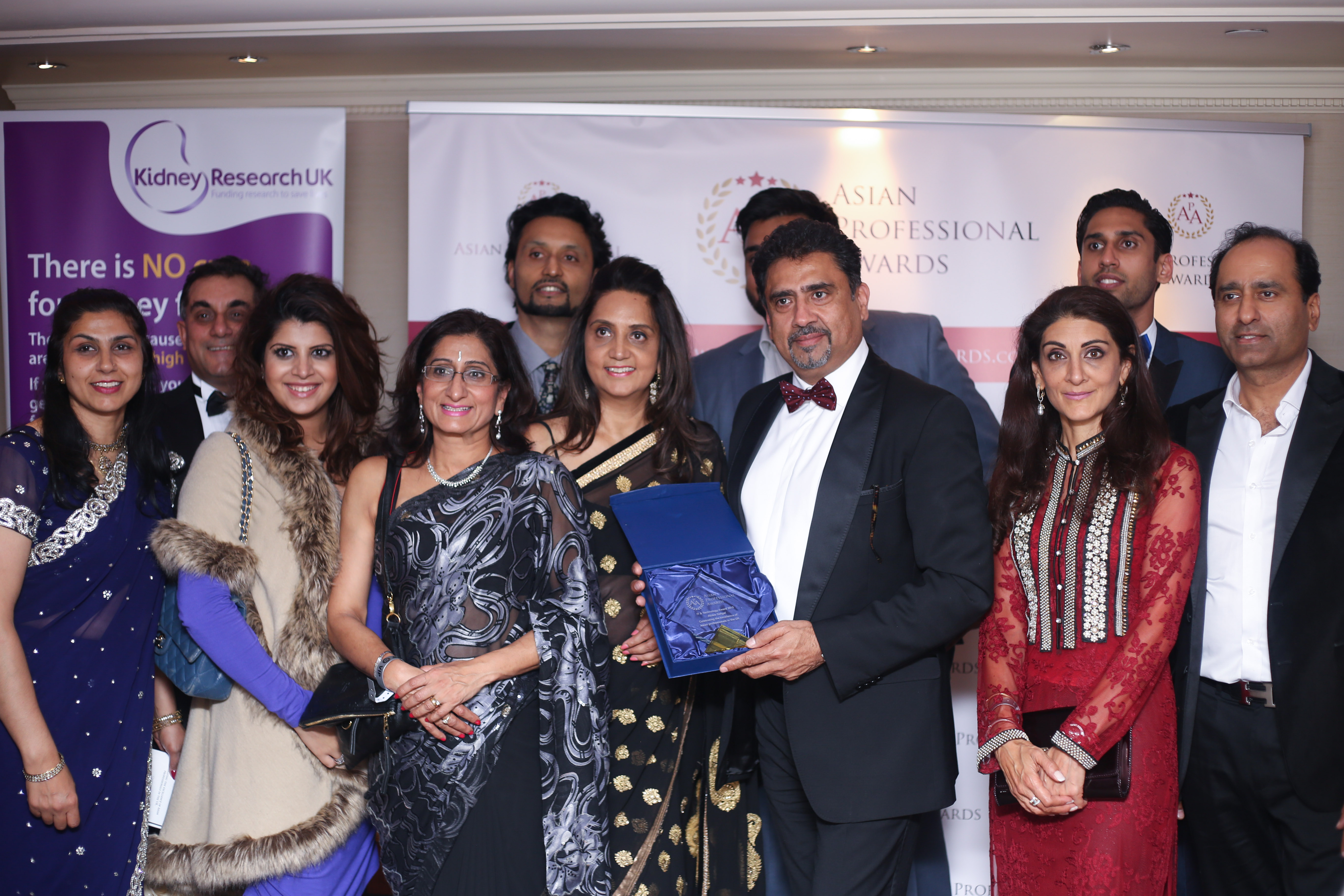
An Asian business leader showcasing his awards at the Grange Hotel in London

=== Economic ===
In 2001, the Centre for Social Markets estimated that British Asian businesses contributed more than £5 billion to GDP. Many British Asians are regarded as affluent middle-class people. As business owners and entrepreneurs, Asian Britons are celebrated for revolutionising the corner shop, expanding the take-away food trade, including the revitalisation of the UK's fish and chips industry by British Chinese, and energising the British economy to a degree which changed Britain's antiquated retail laws forever. In 2004, it was reported that Sikhs had the highest percentage of home ownership in the country, at 82%, out of all UK religious communities. Hindus ranked third highest at 74%, Buddhists were 54%, and Muslims households were listed at 52%.

Many Asian British people have made important contributions to the country's economy by leading and innovating in major UK and international industries. Due to their commercial success, there are a number of British citizens or UK-resident billionaires of Asian ancestry in the United Kingdom. From a Baniya family, Lakshmi Mittal is one of Britain's richest men. In 2017, Forbes ranked him as the 56th-richest person in the world with a net worth of US$20.4 billion. He is also the "57th-most powerful person" of the 72 individuals named in Forbes' "Most Powerful People" list for 2015. The Sunday Times Rich List has included Mittal in its listings since the mid-2000s.

For several years, the publication has had an Asian Rich List section, featuring the wealthiest Asian Britons and UK-residents of Asian descent. In 2019, eight of the top ten, including Mittal, were of a South Asian ethnic background, including Indian-born Briton S. P. Hinduja, of Sindhi heritage, who topped the rankings via the Hinduja Group, with an estimated fortune of £22 billion. Exceptions included British nationals David and Simon Reuben, who were both born in India, and were listed in joint-second place. The Reuben brothers, of West Asian Baghdadi Jewish heritage, are worth over £18 billion. Part of the top ten since 2018, property magnate, and London-resident, Samuel Tak Lee is of East Asian descent and born in British Hong Kong. Other 2019 Asian Rich List UK billionaires included British-Iraqi Nadhmi Auchi and British-Iranian Farhad Moshiri.

=== Food ===
The biggest influence of South Asians on popular British culture has probably been the spread of Indian cuisine, though of the 9,000 Indian restaurants in the UK, most are run by Sylhetis; their ancestral home was part of British India until partition in 1947.

An early record of a Sylheti migrant, by the name of Saeed Ullah, can be found in colonial officer Robert Lindsay's autobiography. Saeed Ullah was said to have migrated not only for work but also to attack Lindsay and avenge his Sylheti elders for the Muharram Rebellion of 1782. They eventually made peace with each other and Saeed was invited to Lindsay's home as a chef. Saeed Ullah's curry is often considered as the first Indian curry cooked in Britain.

Shah Abdul Majid Qureshi claimed to be the first Sylheti to own a restaurant in the country. It was called Dilkush and was located in Soho. Another one of his restaurants, known as India Centre, alongside early Sylheti migrant Ayub Ali Master's Shah Jalal cafe, became hub for the British Asian community and was sites where the India League would hold meetings attracting influential figures such as Subhas Chandra Bose, Krishna Menon and Mulk Raj Anand. Ali was an influential figure who supported working-class lascars, providing them food and shelter. In 1943, Qureshi and Ali founded the Indian Seamen's Welfare League which ensured social welfare for British Asians. Ayub Ali was also the president of the United Kingdom Muslim League having links with Liaquat Ali Khan and Muhammad Ali Jinnah.

The Indian International Chef of the Year Competition founded in 1991 by celebrity chef and restaurateur Mohammad Ajman "Tommy" Miah MBE. The British Curry Awards was founded by restaurateur Enam Ali MBE in 2005.

=== Performing arts ===
Like India, Bhangra music has become popular among many in Britain not only from the works of British South Asian musicians such as Panjabi MC, Swami and Rishi Rich but also incorporated into the works of a number of non-South Asian musicians not only British but including North American artists such as Canadian Shania Twain, who created a whole alternate version of her multi-platinum album Up! with full Indian instrumentation, produced by South Asian producers Simon & Diamond. Diamond, better known as DJ Swami has also collaborated with rapper Pras, of the Fugees, and his band Swami have become one of the most renowned acts in South Asian music history, having had songs in major Hollywood movies and best-selling video games.

One of the first artists of South Asian Indian origin to achieve mainstream success was Apache Indian who infused reggae and hip hop with Indian popular music to create a sound that transcended genre and found a multicultural audience. He is the only Indian artist to have achieved 7 top forty hits in the National UK charts. A subsequent wave of "Asian Underground" artists went on to blend elements of western underground dance music and the traditional music of their home countries, such as Nitin Sawhney, Talvin Singh, Asian Dub Foundation, Panjabi MC, Raghav, and the Rishi Rich Project (featuring Rishi Rich, Jay Sean and Juggy D).

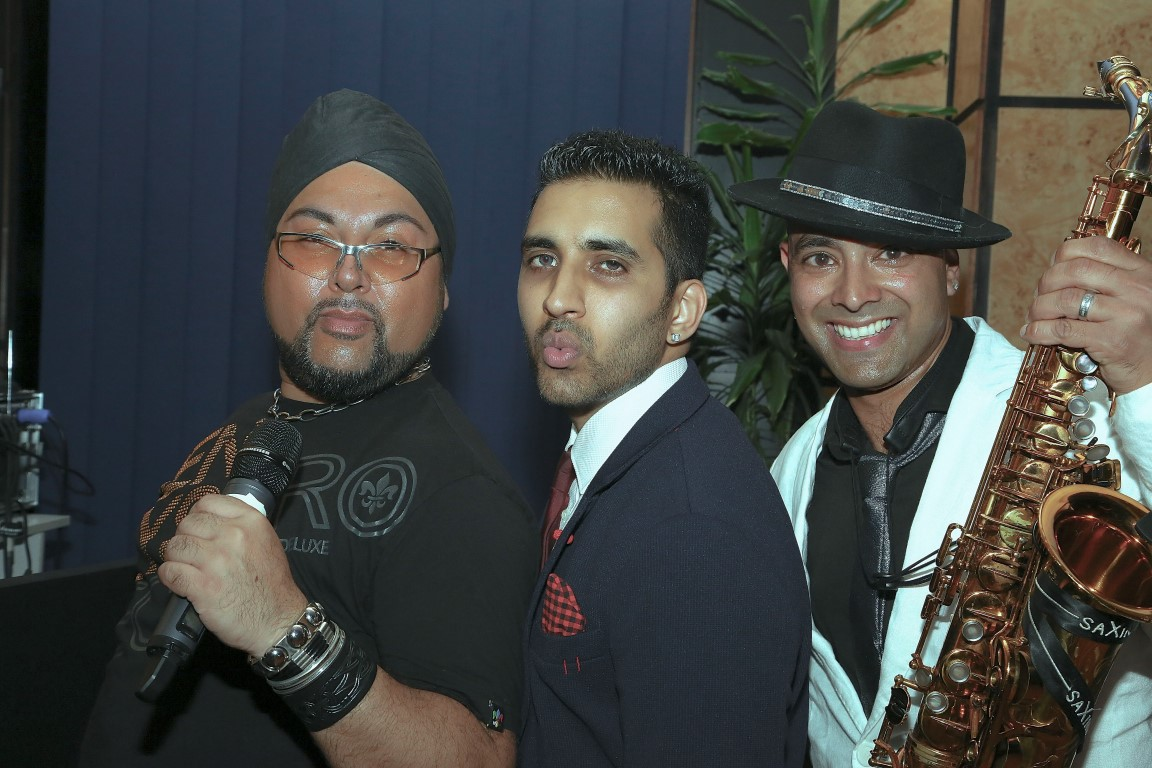
British Asian musicians combining Eastern and Western musical traditions

The influence of South Asian music has not only been from South Asians living in the UK, but also from some UK artists that were starting using South Asian instruments creating a new sound that was a mixture of sitars and tablas with more rock-based western instruments like drums and guitar.

=== Media ===
The films East Is East, Chicken Tikka Masala and Bend It Like Beckham and the TV shows Goodness Gracious Me and The Kumars at No. 42 have managed to attract large, multi-ethnic audiences. The success and popularity of British Pakistani boxer Amir Khan influenced the revival of boxing on ITV Sport.

In 1995, Channel 4 youth culture show The Word hired British mainstream TV's first female South Asian TV Presenter Jasmine Dotiwala as the show's global showbiz reporter.

In 2020, BBC Four released an episode of A Very British History focusing on the history of British Bangladeshis and emigration from Bangladesh from the 1960s onwards, hosted by Dr Aminul Hoque.

=== Awards and achievements ===
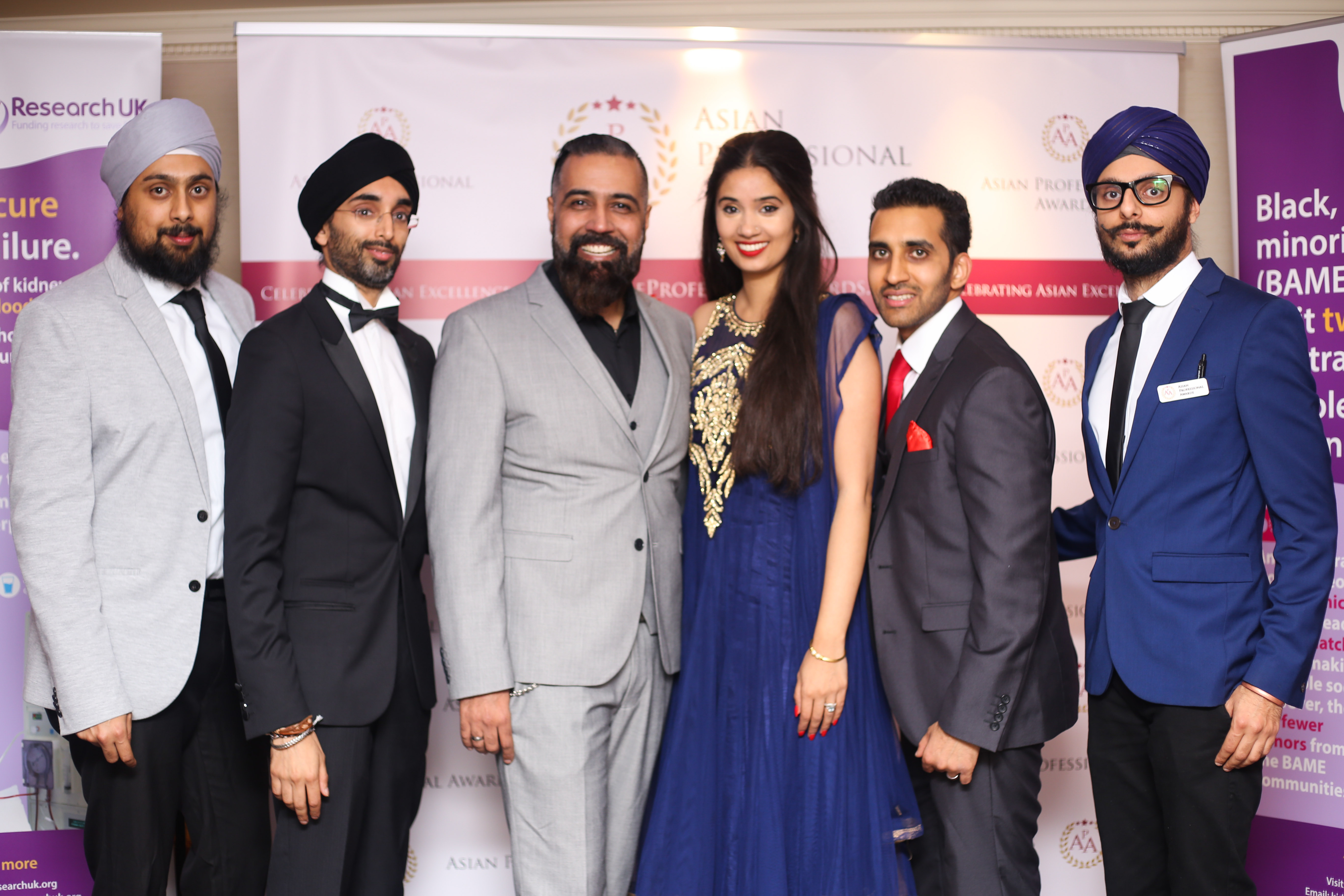
The Asian Professional Awards from left to right: Onkardeep Singh MBE; Jasvir Singh CBE; Sunny & Shay Grewal; Harry Virdee; Param Singh MBE

With the increasing number of high achievers and trail blazers within the Asian community across a variety of professions, the British Asian community has over the years set up a variety of high-profile Award ceremonies to recognise Asian achievements across the full spectrum of professions and industries. These organisations and ceremonies include:

- Asian Achievers Awards organised by Asian Voice since 2000 with women dominating the nominee list for the first time in 2017
- Asian Women of Achievement Awards organised by Pinky Lilani CBE DL since 1999
- Asian Legal Awards organised by the Society for Asian Lawyers since 1994 making it one of the oldest Asian awards ceremonies
- Asian Curry Awards celebrating the best of Asian restaurants since 2010
- The Asian Awards organised by the Lemon Group since 2010 and usually attended by a host of leading celebrities
- The Asian Professional Awards organised by Jasvir Singh CBE and Param Singh since 2014 aimed at celebrating success within the City professions
- The British Curry Awards founded by restaurateur Enam Ali MBE in 2005.
- Indian International Chef of the Year Competition founded in 1991 by celebrity chef and restaurateur Mohammad Ajman "Tommy" Miah MBE.

== Social and political issues ==
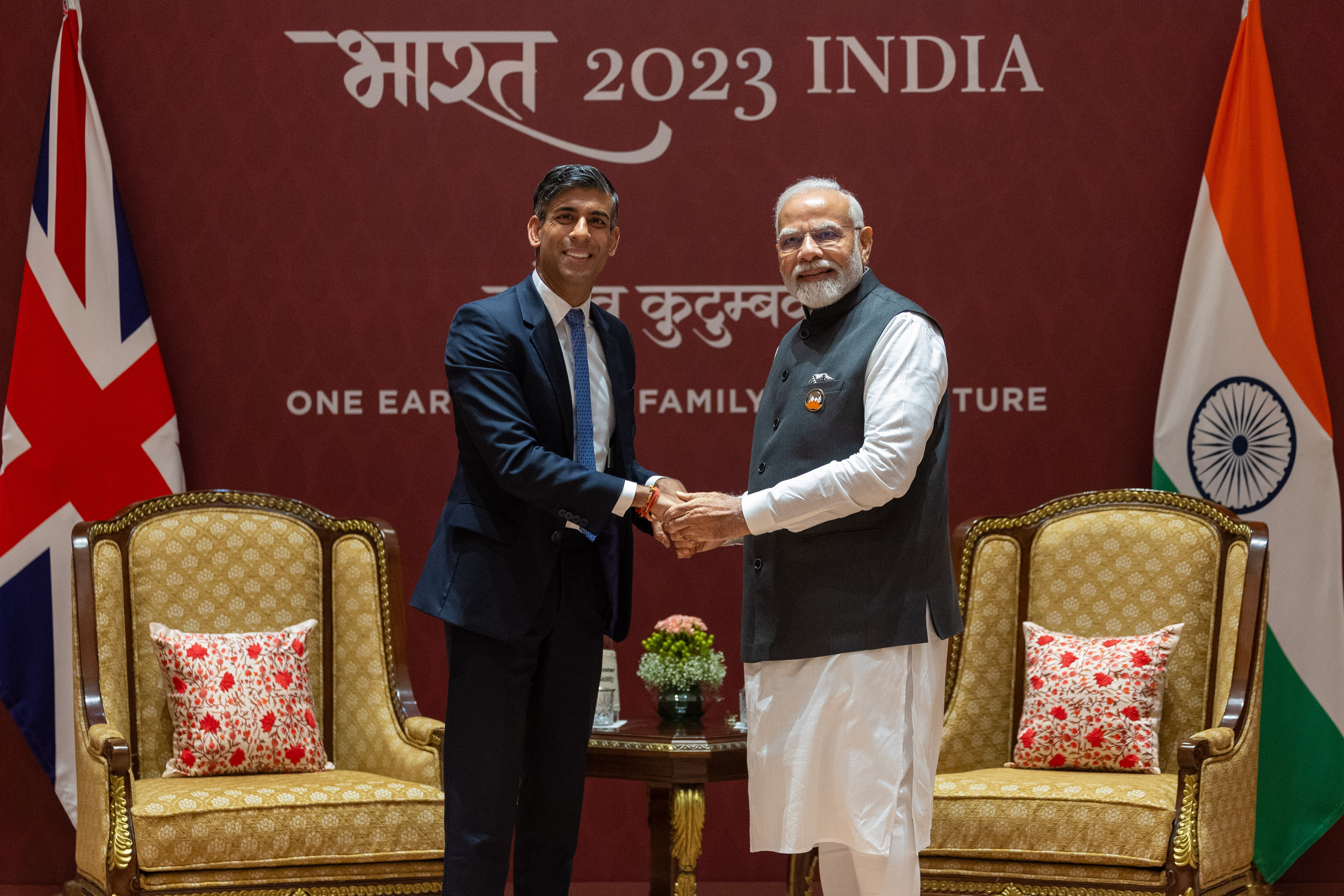
British Prime Minister Rishi Sunak and Indian Prime Minister Narendra Modi in 2023

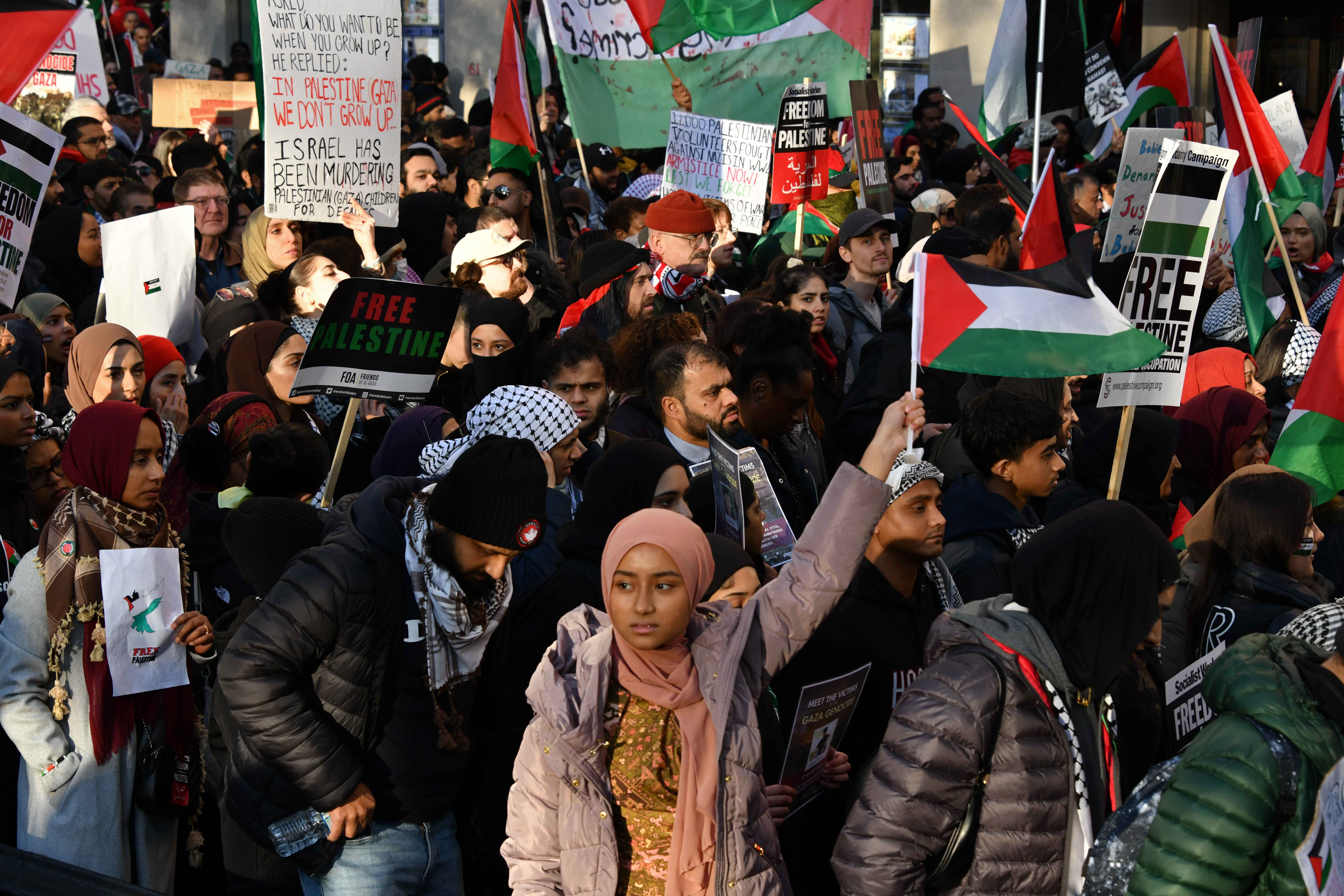
British Asians at a pro-Palestinian, anti-war protest in London, 11 November 2023

=== Discrimination and racism ===
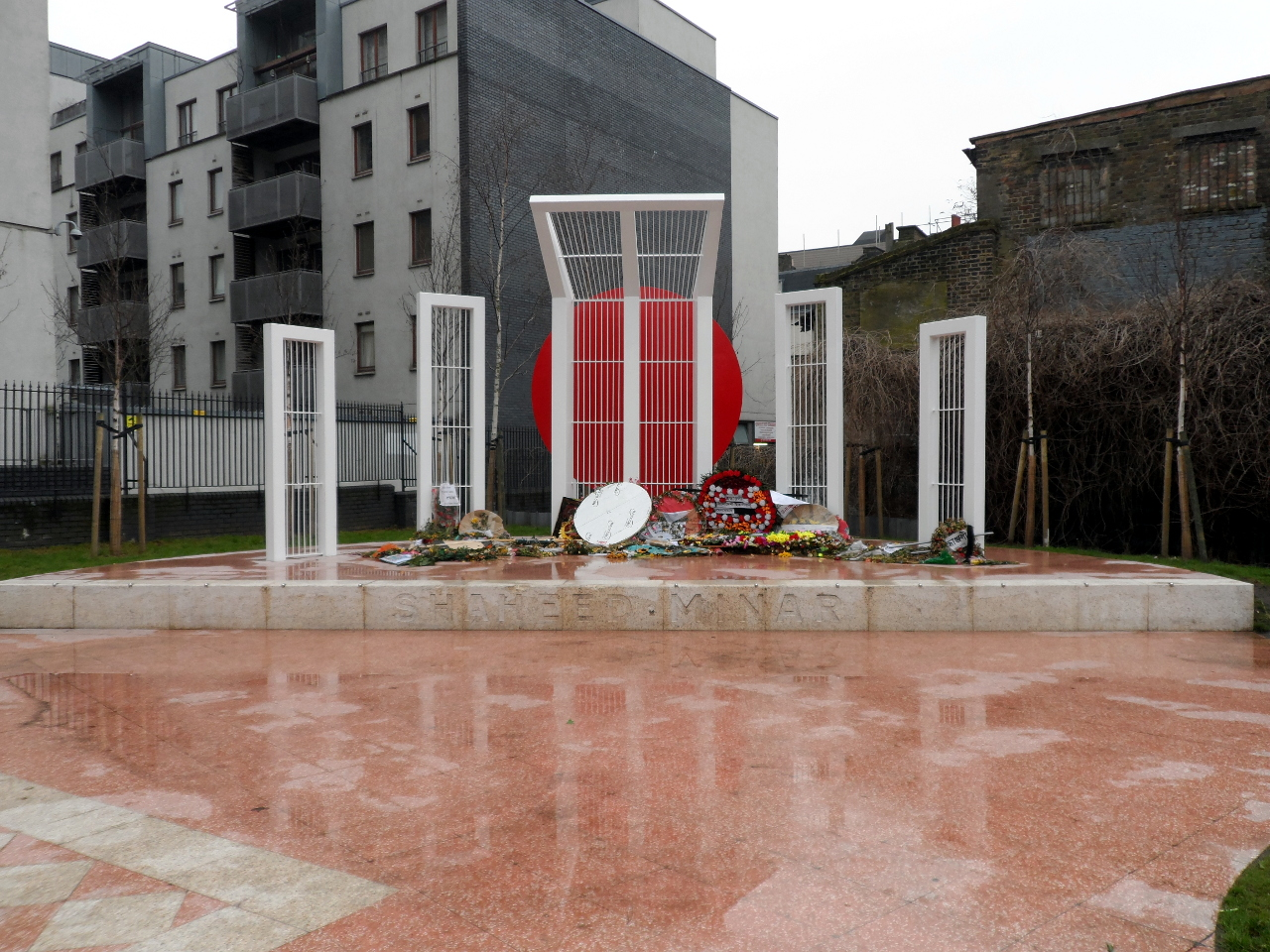
A Shaheed Minar in Altab Ali Park, Whitechapel renamed in honour of the Bangladeshi racial victim Altab Ali

British Asians from a wide range of backgrounds have faced discrimination and racism since the second half of the twentieth century. There have been examples of abuse faced by British Asians and their communities, dating from the 1960s up until the 2020s. Following Enoch Powell's Rivers of Blood speech, and the establishment of the National Front in the late 1960s, the South Asian community in particular faced racial discrimination. This included overt racism in the form of Paki bashing, predominantly from white power skinheads, the National Front, and the National Party, throughout the 1970s and 1980s. British Asians have been historically subjected to forms of discrimination and racism since significant immigration into the UK during the 20th century. Drawing inspiration from the civil rights movement, the Black Power movement, and the South African anti-Apartheid Movement, young British Asian activists began a number of anti-racist Asian youth movements in the 1970s and 1980s, including the Bradford Youth Movement in 1977, the Battle of Brick Lane following the murder of Altab Ali in 1978, and the Newham Youth Movement following the murder of Akhtar Ali Baig in 1980.

According to the UK's hate crime statistics, during the coronavirus pandemic hate crimes directed at both South and East Asian communities increased between two and three-fold.

A 2020 YouGov survey found that 61 percent of Asians (under the label "Other Asian") had experienced being called a racial slur, with British Chinese in particular, self-reporting being racially abused at 76 percent.

=== LGBT communities ===
There have been reports and examples of cultural difficulties with tolerance for LGBT people within some Asian British communities. ITV News has reported: "For many in the Asian Community the fear of stigma or rejection from family leads them to hide their true self and in extreme cases turn to alcoholism, drugs and even suicide".

In 1987, pioneers, Shivanandan Khan and Poulomi Desai co-founded Shakti, the first South Asian LGBTQ campaigning group in Europe.

In 2014, Nazim Mahmood, a British Asian medical doctor working in Harley Street, committed suicide after being advised to "seek a cure" for his sexuality by his parents. As a result of Mahmood's suicide, the Naz and Matt Foundation was created, as a charity to challenge homophobia caused by religious and cultural beliefs.

In 2017, it was reported how gay Asian Britons were "forced into heterosexual marriages" by cultural and religious pressure. As a result, some were actively finding other gay members of the opposite sex for, what the BBC described as, "marriages of convenience".

In 2018, the BBC reported how British comedy-drama series Ackley Bridge had challenged "the taboo and divisive subject of homosexuality" in British Asian society. The broadcaster also reported how a ComRes survey showed that Asian British people, of all ages, appeared to hold "more socially conservative views on gay relationships". According to a survey by the charity Stonewall, more than 50 percent of Asian Britons who identified as LGBT had faced discrimination.

In 2019, the BBC documented the struggle for gay men to find acceptance in the UK's Punjabi Sikh community. ITV News has reported on similar difficulties for gay Sikhs living in Rochdale. In 2020, British actress Jameela Jamil, describing herself as "queer", stated that "it's not easy within the south Asian community to be accepted".

In February 2023, Jasvir Singh CBE, who is described as being "one of the most prominent Sikh voices in British public life", spoke openly about his life as a married gay Sikh man. It was reported that he had received death threats to his life from some elements of the British Sikh community, and that he was also called an infidel on a television station.

== See also ==
- British Bangladeshi
- British Indians
- British Pakistanis
- List of British Sikhs
- British Sri Lankans
- British Tamils
- British Turks
- British Chinese
- List of British Asian people
- Scottish Asian
- Anglo-Indian
- BBC Asian Network
- British Asians in politics of the United Kingdom
- British Cypriots
- British Indo-Caribbean people
- British Iraqis
- Iranians in the United Kingdom
- Foreign-born population of the United Kingdom
- Mauritian diaspora in the United Kingdom
- Nepalese in the United Kingdom
- Non-resident Indian and Person of Indian Origin
- Non-resident Chinese and Person of Chinese Origin
- East Asian Canadians
- South Asian Canadians
- Syrians in the United Kingdom
- Sunrise Radio
- Ugandan migration to the United Kingdom, primarily of Ugandan Asian origin
