= Abdul Wahab Siddiqi =

Pakistani Muslim leader (1942–1994)

Muhammad Abdul Wahab Siddiqi

Personal life
- Born: Muhammad Abdul Wahab Siddiqi; 1942 Lahore, Pakistan
- Died: 1994 (aged 51-52)
- Children: Faiz-ul-Aqtab Siddiqi

Religious life
- Religion: Islam
- Denomination: Sunni
- Jurisprudence: Hanafi
- Tariqa: Naqshbandi (Hijazi)
- Movement: Barelvi
- Arabic name
- Personal (Ism): Muḥammad ʿAbd al-Wahhāb محمد عبد الوهاب
- Patronymic (Nasab): ibn Muḥammad ʿUmar ibn Muḥammad Amīn ibn ʿAbd al-Mālik بن محمد عمر بن محمد أمين بن عبد المالك
- Toponymic (Nisba): aṣ-Ṣiddīqī الصديقي al-Itsharwī الإتشروي

Muhammad Abdul Wahab Siddiqi (1942–1994) was a Pakistani Sunni Muslim religious scholar and Sufi master.

== Early life ==
He was born in 1942, the third son of Muhammad Umar Icharvi, one of Pakistan's leading Sufi scholars of the time, who held the honorary title of Munazare-Azam (the greatest debater) because of his success in defeating the leaders of rival Islamic sects. Despite being the third son, Abdul Wahab was made the head of the branch of the Naqshbandi Sufi order by his father. He founded or co-founded a number of important Islamic Institutions in the United Kingdom and established the Hijazi Sufi Order.

== Founder of the Hijazi branch of the Naqshbandi Sufi Order ==
Abdul Wahab is the founder of the Hijazi Naqshbandiya Sufi Order. Before his death he passed on his position as head of the order to his eldest son. Shaykh Faiz-ul-Aqtab Siddiqi.

== Founding member of Muslim Parliament ==
Abdul Wahab was one of the founding members of the Muslim Parliament and helped draft the Muslim Manifesto He was the vice-chair of the Muslim Parliament at the time of his death

== Founder of Hijaz College ==
Abdul Wahab Siddiqi was the founder of the Hijaz College based in Nuneaton. Abdul Wahab Siddiqi envisioned that the college would be the first of many educational institutions to revive a model of Islamic Education whereby students learnt both traditional Islamic subjects alongside modern physical and social sciences, philosophy and mathematics, alongside traditional spirituality or Sufism.

== Founder of International Muslim Organisation ==
Abdul Wahab Siddiqi and Yassir Arafat

Abdul Wahab Siddiqi was the Founder of the International Muslim Organisation a political body to unite Muslims in different countries to highlight Islamic Values, Civilization, forming Islamic Centres, opening schools, constructing mosques and forming research centres. It has branches in the Netherlands, Belgium, Germany, Canada, Trinidad, Australia and Sri Lanka.

== Tomb ==
Mizaar Hijaz

Abdul Wahab Siddiqi was considered a qutb, a very high form of awliya' (Muslim saint) and as per custom in the Muslim world, a dargah has been built over his grave which is in the grounds of Hijaz College. It is the only one in western Europe.

== "Blessed Summit" ==
This is an annual event at Hijaz College, aimed at inspiring the British youth to adhere to classical Islam. The Blessed Summit encourages its many guests to reflect upon their lives, and take inspiration from the life of Abdul Wahab Siddiqi.

== Children ==
Siddiqi brothers Left to right: Shaykh Zain-ul-Aqtab Siddiqi, Shaykh Faiz-ul-Aqtab Siddiqi, Shaykh Noor-ul-Aqtab Siddiqi

Abdul Wahab Siddiqi trained his four sons in the traditional Islamic sciences and they have all subsequently been educated as professionals, they are:

- Shaykh Faiz-ul-Aqtab Siddiqi Barrister-at-Law,
- Shaykh Noor-ul-Aqtab Siddiqi Solicitor,
- Shaykh Zain-ul-Aqtab Siddiqi Solicitor,
- Shaykh Qamar-ul-Aqtab Siddiqi Surgeon.

His daughter is married to the present CEO of Hijaz College Shaykh Tauqir Ishaq who is also a qualified Civil Engineer.

== See also ==
- Shaikhs in South Asia
- Shaikh Siddiqui
- Siddiqui
