= Matt Mahmood-Ogston =

British LGBTQ+ activist

- Born: Matthew Ogston
- Website: ogston.com

Matt Mahmood-Ogston is a British LGBTQ+ activist, social impact photographer and storyteller. He is best known as the founder of the charity Naz and Matt Foundation, which was established to tackle issues relating to homophobia, religious intolerance, and the challenges faced by LGBTQ+ individuals from religious backgrounds.

== Early life and education ==
Mahmood-Ogston grew up in South Yardley, Birmingham, United Kingdom, with a strong passion for photography, design, and social justice. He pursued a career in web design and user experience consultancy before moving into professional photography and personal branding.

== Personal life ==
Ogston meet Dr. Nazim 'Naz' Mahmood (b. 1979 or 1980) in Birmingham in November 2001. The two began dating and lived in Moseley together, later moving to London. Ogston proposed to Mahmood in 2011. Mahmood Mahmood came out to his family during Eid celebrations in July 2014; he committed suicide two days later, on 30 July, after being told by his family to find a psychiatrist to cure his gay identity. Mahmood's family prevented Ogston from attending the funeral.

Ogston later changed his name to Mahmood-Ogston, although he and Nazim Mahmood had not been legally married at the time of his death.

Matt Mahmood-Ogston resides in London. He dedicates his work to the memory of his late partner, Naz, and remains committed to helping LGBTQ+ individuals overcome challenges posed by cultural and religious intolerance.

== Activism ==
=== Naz and Matt Foundation ===
Mahmood-Ogston founded the Naz and Matt Foundation in 2014, following the death of his fiancé, Naz. The foundation aims to challenge religious and cultural homophobia, raise awareness of LGBTQ+ issues within conservative communities, and provide support to individuals who face discrimination because of their sexuality.

Since its inception, the charity has conducted several high-profile awareness campaigns and educational outreach programmes in schools, universities, and community groups, and has garnered widespread recognition for its work on LGBTQ+ rights in the UK. In 2021, Mahmood-Ogston penned a letter to religious leaders, asking that they work to improve families' relationships with their LGBTQ children.

Mahmood-Ogston has appeared on various television programmes and in print media, including interviews with BBC, Sky News, ITV, The Guardian, and Channel 4. His work has been highlighted for its emotional impact, as well as for its efforts to create societal change, especially within religious communities where LGBTQ+ acceptance is less common.

=== Film ===
Mahmood-Ogston directed the documentary film My God, I'm Queer, which explores the experiences of LGBTQ+ individuals born into Muslim families struggling with cultural and religious intolerance. It won the Asian Media Awards Best TV Programme of 2021 and was shortlisted for the Iris Prize. It provides an in-depth perspective on the challenges faced by LGBTQ+ individuals in conservative communities, aiming to foster understanding and acceptance.

== Awards and recognition ==
- 2017 Attitude Pride Award
- 2021 British LGBT Awards, Top 10 Outstanding Contributors to LGBT+ Life
- 2024 Camden Faith & Belief Awards ‘Outstanding Individual’ Award

== In art and media ==
Artist Lisa Bretherick told the story of Ogston and Mahmood's relationship for the 2016 exhibit The Unbreakable Rope.

Mahmood-Ogston's story is also the basis of the 2017 song "Be The Man" by English folk music group The Young'uns.
