= Arrange Me a Marriage =

- Starring: Aneela Rahman
- Country of origin: United Kingdom

Production
- Running time: 60 minutes

Original release
- Network: BBC2
- Release: 1 March 2007
- Release: 22 November 2007 – 19 January 2008

Arrange Me a Marriage is a British reality TV series, for which the pilot episode aired on BBC2 in March 2007; while the first of five series episodes aired on 22 November 2007.

== Background ==
It was Aneela Rahman's sister, Sidra Khan, who developed the idea with the MD of betty television, Liz Warner. Sidra was working at betty TV as a senior development producer, when Liz Warner showed her a 4 line idea about a Jewish or Muslim marriage broker who could "arrange" marriages for non-Muslims/Jews. Sidra travelled to Glasgow and shot a taster tape of Aneela. Sidra tried to pitch her sister to the head of BBC Entertainment, Elaine Bedell and Mirella Breda. Debi Allen took Aneela on as a client.

== Format ==
British singletons in their mid-30s are found partners using the principles of Asian arranged marriage. Aneela Rahman, a Glasgow based British-Asian marriage arranger, described as the "British Asian Cilla Black," gets their family and friends to network together and find the perfect partner in a four-week period.

Rahman believes that the divorce rate in Britain would decline if more couples were matched up through class, education, family background, life goals and earnings:

"For many non-Asians meeting someone is quite random, in a bar or club – but you wouldn’t buy a house or car drunk so why would you expect to find a life partner like that? Then people wake up 20 years later and wonder why they haven't found someone to settle down with."

Each episode tracks the friends and family of five contestants/singletons, who have four weeks to network on their behalf and find the perfect partner. After Rahman has vetted and met the potential matches, the contestant/singleton is given a choice of two potential matches, from which with the guidance of their family and a brief biography – but no photograph – they choose one match. Each episode culminates in an Asian-style introduction party, where the contestant/singleton meets their chosen match together with both sets of family and friends. The episodes end with updates on how the matches are or are not getting on.

Aneela Rahman, born in Scotland to immigrant Pakistani parents, met her husband Maqsood when she was 25 through an arranged marriage – they married 18 months later. The couple have been married for 15 years, have two children.
