= Tommy Miah =

Bangladeshi-born British chef (born 1959)

- Born: Mohammad Ajman Miah; 28 March 1959 (age 67); South Sylhet Mahakuma, Chittagong Division, East Pakistan
- Education: Aston Manor School
- Spouse: Rina Miah (m. 1975)
- Culinary career
- Cooking style: Bengali cuisine
- Current restaurant
- Raj Restaurant
- Previous restaurant
- Curry Capital (formerly Rupali)
- Website: tommymiahuk.com

Mohammad Ajman Miah (Bengali: মোহাম্মদ আজমান মিয়া), MBE FRSA (born 28 March 1959), better known by his nickname Tommy Miah, is a Bangladeshi-born British chef, owner of the Raj Restaurant and founder of the International Indian Chef of the Year Competition. He is often recognised as the "Curry King" in Britain.

== Early life ==
Miah was born in a village in South Sylhet subdivision, Chittagong Division, East Pakistan (now Bangladesh). He arrived at the age of 10 in Birmingham, England. He was interested in food and cooking due to which he began working in the catering industry. He began by starting his own small takeout restaurant at the age of 17.

== Career ==
Miah established himself in Edinburgh and founded Raj Restaurant. In 1991, he founded the International Indian Chef of the Year Competition- which attracts 5000 entrants from around the world- to promote innovation and quality in Indian cooking.

He was chosen to head the first South Asian Association for Regional Cooperation Food Festival in Delhi. He was also selected by the Bangladesh Foreign Office to represent Bangladesh, cooking typical Bangladeshi staple dishes.

Miah established the Tommy Miah Institute of Hospitality Management, which is an institution which trains Bangladeshis in the international hospitality industry. He also owns the Original Raj Hotel in Murrayfield and The Heritage Restaurant in Dhaka, Bangladesh.

Miah's achievements include delivering a curry lunch-box to 10 Downing Street for the then Prime Minister John Major's 50th birthday, producing the world's largest curry, which was large enough to feed 10,000, promoting innovation and quality in Asian cuisine, developing dishes for high class manufacturers, writing cooking books. He was the first to make Indian meals available on flights worldwide. He has sponsored many charity groups both in Bangladesh and Britain, which include Cancer Research UK, Shishu Polli, Centre for the Rehabilitation of the Paralysed, and the ORBIS Flying Eye Hospital. Tommy Miah runs food hygiene classes for refugee camps in Bangladesh, and also sponsors foreign students to study in the UK.

== Awards and recognition ==
In 2004, Miah was elected a fellow of Royal Society of Arts.

In 2017, Miah was appointed a Member of the Order of the British Empire (MBE) in the 2017 Birthday Honours for his services to the hospitality industry and charity.
