= Hijaz College =

British Muslim school

Coordinates: 52.5469°N 1.4239°W

Hijaz College Islamic University
- Type: Islamic College and University
- Established: 1994
- Principal: Faiz-ul-Aqtab Siddiqi
- Location: Nuneaton, Warwickshire, England
- Campus: 62 acres
- Program: Bachelor of Arts Arabic Language; Islamic Law and Theology
- Website: hijaz.org

Hijaz College is a British Muslim school located in Nuneaton, Warwickshire, England. Hijaz College combines traditional Islamic education with the National Curriculum for England. The philosophy of Hijaz was formulated by its patron and founder Abdul Wahab Siddiqi (1942–94) in 1994.

As of 2016 its principal was his eldest son Shaykh Faiz-ul-Aqtab Siddiqi. The Jamia Islamia in Coventry, founded in 1979, produced dozens of graduates who became fully qualified Ulema (scholars of Islam) and doctors, lawyers, engineers etc.

As of 2008, Hijaz College is run by the Chief Executive Shaikh Tauqir Ishaq, a chartered civil engineer by profession and Islamic scholar. The LLB law degree is also taught combined with religious sciences. Graduates of Hijaz College are awarded a Bachelor of Arts in Islamic Law and Theology and are qualified in Islamic jurisprudence, Qur'anic and Hadith sciences and Arabic etymology.

In 1994 the vision of Hijaz College started to take a different shape in the form of Hijaz College Islamic University. The college takes its name from the region in modern-day Saudi Arabia which comprises Mecca, Medina and Taif.

Hijaz College has grown in many aspects, one of them being its expansion project covering a total extended area of 97,000 sq ft (9,000 m^{2}), costing over £5 million and intended to increase the student accommodation capacity from 125 to 500 (as of 2008) Its plans include extended teaching facilities and resources including a library which will display over 700,000 books.

Hijaz College is independent from any governmental organisation.

In December 2007, the UK's first official sharia court was set up at Hijaz college. By September 2008, it had settled more than 100 civil disputes between Muslims. Sharia court is not a replacement for English law and users of the court must still abide by English law. The court is designed to settle civil matters only. Any issues actually involving the laws and regulations of the United Kingdom must still be upheld. Needs adding references that sharia court is more like a community meeting and not an Actual court and does not hold the English law to account.
