= Shree Lakshmi Narayan Hindu Temple, Bradford =

Hindu temple in Bradford, England

Coordinates: 53.79262°N 1.73502°W

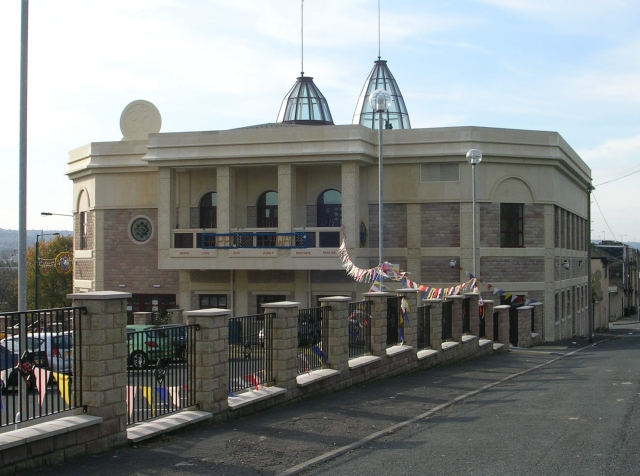
Shree Lakshmi Narayan Hindu Temple, Bradford

The Shree Lakshmi Narayan Hindu Temple in Bradford, West Yorkshire is the largest Hindu temple (mandir) in Northern England. The temple was designed by local Yorkshire architects and built by a local construction company. The temple is faced with Yorkshire stone, and the design modern, reflecting the position of Hindus as part of contemporary Yorkshire society. The temple is unusual in housing most of the major deities revered by the Hindu community, in addition to Lakshmi Narayan, the main deities. This reflects the needs of the Hindu population in the United Kingdom, where temples have to serve all types of Hindus rather than just followers of a specific deity.

Queen Elizabeth II and Prince Philip visited the temple on 24 May 2007, for its official Opening Ceremony.
