= Qasim Beg =

British kickboxer

Qasim Beg, Qasim Nisar
- Born: 22 April 1989 (age 37); Birmingham, England
- Nickname: 'The Dream'
- Nationality: (England) English
- Height: 5 ft 10 in (1.78 m)
- Weight: 62.5 kg (138 lb; 9.84 st)
- Style: Kickboxing
- Fighting out of: Birmingham, England
- Team: D.T.C
- Trainer: Neil Kelly

Kickboxing record
- Total: 51
- Wins: 50
- By knockout: UNRECORDED
- Losses: 1

Amateur record
- Total: 22
- Wins: 21
- By knockout: 14
- Losses: 0
- By knockout: 0
- Draws: 0
- No contests: 1

Other information
- Occupation: Chief Instructor at Dream Team Combat

Qasim Beg, formerly known as Qasim Nisar (Urdu: قاسم نثار), is an English kickboxer in the Super Lightweight division.

== Personal life ==
Beg was born in Birmingham, England to a British Pakistani family of Mughal descent. Beg initially studied Karate, however decided he wanted to engage in a more practical sport and took up Kickboxing. He has now taken the liberty and he is leaving Neil Kelly to start his own gym named 'Dream Team Combat' which is in the works as of now.

Within two and a half years Beg went on to win the English National title, two British titles, the European Championship and the Amateur World Championship belt, stating his goal was to compete at a professional world level.

== Amateur career ==
Beg took part in his first Amateur full contact bout in May 2005 and went 21-0-1, winning 14 of those by way of stoppage.

Beg also remained unbeaten in 30 ring light continuous bouts. He has won an English Championship, 3 versions of the British title, 3 versions of the European crown and 2 versions of the World title.

== Professional career ==
In October 2007, Beg contested his first Professional full contact fight and he remains unbeaten to date.

=== Cancelled WKA World Championship ===
In 2011, Beg was to fly out to Westbury, New York for a world title bout against three times World Champion Bobby Campbell for the WKA belt, in a highly anticipated match-up many predicted would play into Begs favor.

Campbell, who had previously fended off five challengers for the belt, stated "(Beg) is undefeated in all of his amateur and pro fights...We look forward to fighting Qasim, as we feel he is one of the best in world, and I always take on the best..."

Beg stated he was eager to travel to New York to take on the "great fighter", however the fight never took place.

=== Comeback ===
After two and a half years off, Beg returned to the sport on 24 March 2013 in a match-up against Edward Bettison, Beg managed to floor his opponent twice before going onto win.

His second comeback fight will take place on 16 June 2013, for a British title.

== Outside kickboxing ==
=== Charity Work ===
In 2010, Beg helped raise funds for Cancer Research UK by taking part in an event where he took on 50 opponents for five hours, the event took place at USKA Gym, Montgomery Street, Sparkbrook, and was free for everyone to attend.

=== Music career ===
Beg has previously had a Rapping career, whereby he went under the alias 'Kastro'. He was a member of the birmingham based "SHM" (Small Heath Mandems).

== Accomplishments ==
- F.I.S.T English National Champion (Light Continuous)
- F.I.S.T British Champion (Light Continuous)
- W.A.K.O Amateur ring sports British open Champion (Light Continuous) 2005
- W.A.K.O European junior open Champion (Light Continuous) 2005
- I.S.K.A European Champion (Light Continuous) 2006
- I.S.K.A Light Weight Midland Area Champion (Full Contact)
- 60 kg Golden Belt Champion (Full Contact)
- Nordic Open Champion 2006 (Light Continuous) 2006
- I.S.K.A British Champion (Light Continuous) 2006
- I.S.K.A Light Weight English National Champion (Full Contact)
- I.S.K.A Super Lightweight British Champion (Full Contact)
- WAKO British Super Lightweight Champion 2007 (Full Contact)
- I.S.K.A European Champion 2007 (Light Continuous)
- I.S.K.A Super Lightweight European Champion (Full Contact)
- Golden Belt -62 kg European Champion (Full Contact)
- I.S.K.A Super Lightweight World Champion (Full Contact)
- W.P.K.C Super Lightweight World Champion (Full Contact)
- I.S.K.A Midlands Open Champion (Light Continuous) 2008
- I.S.K.A English Open Champion (Light Continuous) 2009
- I.S.K.A Professional Super Lightweight English Champion
- I.S.K.A European Champion 2009 (Light Continuous)
- I.K.F Professional British Lightweight Champion
- ICO British Champion 2010 (Light Continuous)

== See also ==
- British Pakistanis
- Imran Khan (kickboxer)
