= Faiz-ul-Aqtab Siddiqi =

British Muslim scholar and leader

Personal life
- Born: Faiz-ul-Aqtab Siddiqi; 12 July 1967 (age 58) Lahore, Pakistan
- Parent: Abdul Wahab Siddiqi (father)

Religious life
- Religion: Islam
- Denomination: Sunni
- Jurisprudence: Hanafi
- Tariqa: Naqshbandi (Hijazi)
- Movement: Barelvi
- Arabic name
- Personal (Ism): Fayḍ al-Aqṭāb فيض الأقطاب
- Patronymic (Nasab): ibn ʿAbd al-Wahhāb ibn ʿUmar ibn Amīn ibn ʿAbd al-Mālik بن عبد الوهاب بن عمر بن أمين بن عبد المالك
- Toponymic (Nisba): aṣ-Ṣiddīqī الصديقي al-Itsharwī الإتشروي
- Website: blessedsummit.com

Faiz-ul-Aqtab Siddiqi (born 1967) is a Muslim scholar, principal of the Hijaz College, founder of Hijaz Community, founder of Hijaz Expo, national convener for the campaign for Global Civility, National Convenor of the Muslim Action Committee (MAC), President General of the International Muslims Organisation, Grand Blessed Guide of the Naqshbandi Qadri Hijazi Sufi Order, Chairman of Muslim Arbitration Tribunal, international lecturer in Islam, and a barrister at law.

== Family of Religious Scholars ==
Shaykh Faiz-ul-Aqtab Siddiqi is the eldest son of the late Murshid Abdul Wahab Siddiqi and the grandson of Maulana Muhammad Umar Icharvi. Murshid Siddiqi's bloodline traces its origins directly to Murshid Abu Bakr Siddiq, the first Caliph of Islam and one of the closest companions of the Muhammad. He studied under his father and many other Shayukh of the time. Later he studied at Al-Azhar University in Egypt

Murshid Siddiqi's father, Late Murshid Maulana Abdul Wahab Siddiqi's mausoleum and final resting place is in Nuneaton, UK. According to the British Pilgrimage Trust, the mausoleum where Sheikh Muhammad Abdul Wahab Siddiqi lies, which is based at Hijaz College, is one of the most significant religious sites of pilgrimage in all of Western Europe.

== Head of Global Naqshbandi Qadri Hijazi Spiritual Sufi Order ==
Murshid Faiz-ul-Aqtab Siddiqi is the leader of the Naqshbandi Qadri Hijazi Spiritual Sufi Order, a branch of Sufism with followers in over 34 countries.

== National convener for the campaign for Global Civility ==
During the Danish cartoon controversy, a meeting of Islamic scholars in the United Kingdom took place in which Murshid Faiz ul Aqtab Siddiqi was chosen to represent the perspectives of British scholars and Muslims. The meeting aimed to foster dialogue around freedom of speech, particularly addressing concerns regarding the potential harm caused by unrestrained expression.

As part of this initiative, an organisation of scholars advocated for what they termed "global civility," proposing the establishment of a standard of civility in public discourse. Murshid Siddiqi authored a Declaration of Global Civility, which called upon world leaders to support the notion that mutual respect, rather than insults or vilification, should be the foundation of a civil society.

== Principal of Hijaz College ==
He is the principal and founding trustee of Hijaz College in Nuneaton, England, where he resides on campus.

== Champion of Muslim Unity ==
Shaykh Siddiqi is a signatory to Charter 3:103 based on the verse of the Qur'an which urges Muslims to remain united despite sectarian differences.

== Convenor of the Muslim Action Committee and Muslim Action Forum ==
Siddiqi convened the Muslim Action Committee, an umbrella organisation of Sunni and Shia Islamic scholars and Islamic political groups such as the Islamic Human Rights Commission and Hizb ut-Tahrir to organise a demonstration against the repeated publications of the Danish cartoons of the Islamic prophet, Muhammad. The demonstration was the largest in Europe and the largest within the UK since the Salman Rushdie incident. The organisation works to combat attacks on Islamic religious symbols.

== Founder of Hijaz Community ==
Murshid Siddiqi is the founder of Hijaz Community, which is an international network of over 10,000 professionals, focused on contributing to community enrichment through a various initiatives.

A team of 150 Hijaz community volunteers delivered over 1700 food parcels to key workers, including police and medical workers, in the towns of Hinckley and Nuneaton during the coronavirus pandemic.

== Profession as Barrister ==
Murshid Faiz-ul-Aqtab Siddiqi is a barrister under English and Welsh law, and as such is a member of the Lincoln's Inn since 1991 and practiced law for over a decade.

== President General of International Muslim Organisation (IMO) ==
Murshid Siddiqi is the President General of the International Muslim Organisation (IMO), founded in 1980 and headquartered in The Hague, Netherlands, aims to address the religious, social, and cultural needs of the global Muslim community.

== Controversy ==
=== Over Sharia courts in the UK ===
Siddiqi was among the guests on the Law in Action programme aired on 28 November 2006 which discussed the issue of Sharia courts in the UK, which was covered by many newspapers and other media. Siddiqi made the following observation about the issues:

"Because we follow the same process as any case of arbitration, our decisions are binding in English law. Unless our decisions are unreasonable, they are recognised by the High Court."

Siddiqi was also involved in a debate in London in February 2008 entitled KINGDOM OF GOD: the Archbishop, the Sharia and the Law of the Land in response to a speech by Archbishop Rowan Williams, in which Siddiqi defended and advocated the use of Islamic Family Law in the UK and showed hope that in the future a more educated and spiritual Muslim community in Britain would be able to live under all aspects of Sharia Law.

Siddiqi launched the Muslim Arbitration Tribunal to deal with the issue of forced marriages within the Muslim community.

Siddiqi delivered a lecture within the walls of Temple Church entitled "Family Law, Minorities and legal Pluralism: Should English Law give more Recognition to Islamic Law?" in November 2008 which sparked media controversy over its endorsement of polygamy.
