= Naz and Matt Foundation =

British charity

- Formation: 2014
- Type: NGO
- Legal status: Charity
- Purpose: LGBT rights
- Executive Director: Matt Mahmood-Ogston
- Website: www.nazandmattfoundation.org

Naz and Matt Foundation is a charity based in the United Kingdom that tackles homophobia triggered by religious and cultural beliefs.

The organisation was established in 2014 following the death of Dr Nazim Mahmood, by his long term fiancé Matt Mahmood-Ogston (formerly Matthew Ogston).

The primary objective of the charity is to "tackle homophobia triggered by religion to help parents accept their children". The Foundation campaigns in the national media and give talks in schools and universities. They provide support to LGBTQI individuals and their family to help resolve challenges linked to sexuality, gender identity and religion.

== Current work ==
Naz and Matt Foundation have a schools programme for secondary schools and are UK publishers of a children's book, Salim's Secret.

The charity has delivered school talks in the UK, including Bradford, Birmingham, Leeds, London, Oldham and York focusing on the importance for parents and families to accept their relatives regardless of their sexuality or gender identity.

Founder Matt Mahmood-Ogston has campaigned in the local, national and international press to raise awareness of the dangers of homophobia triggered by religious or cultural belief. And more recently calling for the criminalisation of 'gay cure therapy', also known as conversion therapy.

In April 2015, the Foundation led by Matt marched 150 miles from London to Birmingham to raise awareness about what happened to Dr Nazim Mahmood, and the dangers of homophobia if not tackled within families and religious communities.

In 2017, English folk group The Young'uns released a new song called "Be the Man", on their album "Strangers", documenting the love story of Naz and his fiancé Matt, whom the charity was named after.

In 2018 and 2019 the Foundation worked with actress Bhavna Limbachia and UK TV soap Coronation Street to support a high-profile storyline featuring the programme's first ever lesbian Muslim character, Rana Habeeb and her onscreen romantic relationship with Kate Connor (played by Faye Brookes). The storyline was inspired by the story of what happened to Dr Nazim Mahmood (Matt's fiancé)

In 2023 the Foundation launched a parent-led support group for Desi parents who have LGBTQI+ children., and appeared in the BBC One documentary My Hindu Coming Out Story, as part of the series Love, Faith and Me.

== Awards ==
- Awarded 'Best Programme/Show of 2021' for their documentary "My God, I'm Queer" at the Asian Media Awards in Manchester. The film was broadcast on Channel 4 and shortlisted for the Iris Prize. at the Asian Media Awards in Manchester
- Awarded the "Faith and Belief Community Award" for the charity's work supporting faith and belief communities in Greater London with their annual #OutAndProudParentsDay campaign
- Shortlisted for a British LGBT Awards, 'Top 10 Charity or Community Initiative' (2019)
- Awarded the True Honour Award for "Outstanding Organisation Tackling 'Honour' Based Violence" by the Kurdish Women's Rights Organisation (IKWRO) (2019)
- Shortlisted for the "Upstanding Organisation Award" at the No2H8 Crime Awards, organised by Tell MAMA (2017)
- Awarded the JCI 'Ten outstanding young persons' award for 'Cultural Achievement' (2016)
- Founder, Matthew Mahmood-Ogston, voted the sixth 'most influential lesbian, gay, bisexual, transgender person in Britain' (2015)
- Awarded the Attitude Pride Award for 'building bridges between religious and LGBT communities (2015)'

== See also ==
- LGBT rights in the United Kingdom
- List of LGBT rights organisations
