= Imran Khan (kickboxer) =

British Pakistani Muay Thai kickboxer

Kickboxing record
- Total: 51
- Wins: 42
- Losses: 8
- Draws: 1

Imran Khan is a British Pakistani Muay Thai kickboxer who competes at Welterweight.

He is 2x time World Champion, 3x time European Champion and 3x time British Champion and Junior champion at the age of 13.

== Personal life ==
He was born in Sheffield, England. He started Muay Thai at the age of 11. Other than Kickboxing, he also works for a family car business.

== Career ==
Throughout his career, Imran Khan has been a 2x time World Champion, 3x time European Champion and 3x time British Champion and Junior champion at the age of 13.

He fought for the World Professional Kickboxing Council (WPKC) belt in Sheffield, and the Golden Belt World Title in Bangkok both of which he won.

== Boxing career ==
Coming off several defeats to the likes of then No1 ranked ISKA World Champion Tim Thomas in 2011 (who Khan had previously drawn with), and 18 time Muay Thai and kickboxing world champion Andrei Kulebin, Khan's career went into jeopardy with rumors he was through. Imran Khan made a decision to focus on a boxing career, however, the boxing career was short-lived as he soon returned to Muay Thai.

== Return to Muay Thai ==
2012 saw a winning come-back for Khan following his defeat by Thomas, he was again fighting alongside 'The Bad Company' Thai boxing club against champion Miguel Varela and then setting up a bout against lethal Irish star and World Champion Josh Palmer in late 2012. Khan went on to win the tough battles.

== See also ==
- British Pakistanis
- Qasim Nisar
- Ashraf Tai
