= South Asians in the United Kingdom =

Part of the demographics of the UK

Total population
- 5,000,000; Indian – 1,927,150 – 2.9% (Census 2021/22) Pakistani – 1,662,286 – 2.5% (Census 2021/22) Bangladeshi – 651,834 – 1.0% (Census 2021/22) Other South Asian – 700,000 (approx) – 1.1% (Census 2021/22)

Languages
- Languages of Afghanistan; Languages of Bangladesh; Languages of Bhutan; Languages of India; Languages of Maldives; Languages of Nepal; Languages of Pakistan; Languages of Sri Lanka

Religion
- Hinduism, Sikhism, Islam, Buddhism, Christianity, Jainism, Non-religious, others

Related ethnic groups
- British Indo-Caribbean people; South Asian Americans; South Asian Canadians; Dutch South Asians; South Asian diaspora

South Asians in the United Kingdom have been present in the country since the 17th century, with significant migration occurring in the mid-20th century. They originate primarily from eight sovereign states in South Asia which are, in alphabetical order, the countries of Afghanistan, Bangladesh, Bhutan, India, Maldives, Nepal, Pakistan, and Sri Lanka. There is also a history of migration of diasporic South Asians from Africa and Southeast Asia moving to, and settling in, the United Kingdom.

Rishi Sunak was the first Prime Minister of the United Kingdom to be of Indian descent.

== Population ==
There are approximately 5 million people of South Asian heritage in the UK, or 7.5% of the British population.

According to the 2021 United Kingdom census, there are 1,927,150 people of Indian/British Indian ethnicity (2.9%), 1,662,286 people of Pakistani /British Pakistani ethnicity (2.5%), 651,834 people of Bangladeshi/ British Bangladeshi ethnicity (1.0%), and an estimated further 700,000 from other South Asian heritage backgrounds.

South Asians in the UK are represented by many different ethnic groups native to the region of South Asia. The BBC has frequently described them as South Asian groups, or South Asian ethnic groups, due to the diversity of ethnic and ethnolinguistic groupings that might be considered as South Asian people.

Various British institutions consider there to be eight South Asian sovereign states. The London School of Economics's South Asia Centre describes its academic objective as "Unravelling South Asia — Afghanistan, Bhutan, Bangladesh, India, Maldives, Myanmar, Nepal, Pakistan and Sri Lanka — to the World." The Minister of State for South Asia and the Commonwealth (a UK Government cabinet office) covers the Asian subregion, with the junior position also representative as the Minister for Afghanistan.

== History ==
South Asian peoples began arriving in cities in Britain, such as London, around the mid-17th century. The most significant period of migration from South Asia, however, was in the middle of the 20th century. Between 1870 and 1950, South Asians had an impact on several areas of British society, including minority rights, war, and representation.

=== Lascars ===
==== 17th century ====
Many South Asians came from ships and boats as servants and maids for the more rich. English commerce on the Indian subcontinent brought some of these people to England and four South Asian men in London answered the call for sailors for the first English East India Company fleet to Asia. Their Portuguese names identifies them as mixed-race Portuguese Luso-Asians. Since the 17th century, the East India Company employed thousands of South Asian lascars, scholars and workers (who were mostly Bengali or Muslim) mainly to work on British ships and ports around the world.

==== 18th century ====
The first group of South Asians to migrate in notable numbers, in the 18th century, were lascars (sailors) recruited from the Indian subcontinent (largely from the Bengal region) to work for the British East India Company, with some choosing to settle down in Britain after either being abandoned by their captains or choosing to desert from their positions of employment. Many were unable to find jobs and were described in letters as "miserable objects", who were often "shivering and starving in the streets". Letters to newspapers in 1785 talked of "the number of miserable objects, Lascars, … shivering and starving in the streets". Some lascars took British wives, and some converted to Anglican Christianity (at least nominally) in order to marry, possibly due to a lack of South Asian women in Britain at the time. Most Indians during this period would visit or reside in Britain temporarily, returning to India after months or several years, bringing back knowledge about Britain in the process. 38 lascars were reported arriving in British ports in 1760.

==== 19th century ====
Between 1600 and 1857, some 20–40,000 Indian men and women of all social classes had travelled to Britain, the majority of them being seamen working on ships. Lascars lodged in British ports in between voyages. Most Indians during this period would visit or reside in Britain temporarily, returning to India after months or several years, bringing back knowledge about Britain in the process.

One of the most famous early Indian immigrants to Britain was Sake Dean Mahomet, a captain of the British East India Company and a native of Patna in the Indian state of Bihar.

Due to the majority being lascars, the earliest Muslim communities were found in port towns, found living in barracks, Christian charity homes and hostels. The first and most frequent South Asian travelers to Britain were Christian Indians and those of European-Asian mixed-race descent. For Muslim Indians considerations about how their dietary and religious practices would alienate them from society at large were brought into question but these considerations were often outweighed by economic opportunities. Those that stayed often adopted British customs, dress and diet. Naval cooks also came, many of them from the Sylhet Division of what is now Bangladesh. One of the most famous early Muslim immigrants to England was Sake Dean Mahomed, a captain of the British East India Company who in 1810 founded London's first Indian restaurant, the Hindoostane Coffee House. He is also reputed for introducing shampoo and therapeutic massage to the United Kingdom. In 1784 he migrated to Ireland where he fell in love with a woman called Jane Daly. He converted to Anglicanism in order to marry her, as it was illegal at the time for non-Protestants to marry Protestants. They later moved to Brighton.

After reports of lascars suffering from poverty made their way to the ear of the general public, the East India Company responded by making lodgings available for them, but no checks were kept on the boarding houses and barracks they provided to the lascars. Many lascars found that their new living accommodations were often of a poor quality, and reports of Lascars being mistreated were submitted to the Society for the Protection of Asiatic Sailors, which was founded in 1814.

In 1842, the Church Missionary Society reported on the dire "state of the Lascars in London" it was reported in the winter of 1850, 40 Asian men, also known as 'sons of India', were found dead of cold and hunger on the streets of London. Shortly after these reports evangelical Christians proposed the construction of a charity house and gathered £15,000 in assistance of the Lascars. In 1856 the Strangers' Home for Asiatics, Africans and South Sea Islanders was opened in Commercial Road, Limehouse under the manager Lieutenant-Colonel R. Marsh Hughes.

The Navigation Act 1660 restricted the employment of non-English sailors to a quarter of the crew on returning East India Company ships. Baptism records in East Greenwich suggest that young Indians from the Malabar Coast were being recruited as servants at the end of the 17th century, and records of the EIC also suggest that Indo-Portuguese cooks from Goa were retained by captains from voyage to voyage. In 1797, 13 were buried in the parish of St Nicholas at Deptford.

==== 20th century ====
It is estimated 8,000 Indians (a large proportion being lascar sailors) lived in Britain permanently prior to the 1950s. Although, the comparatively few lascars that gained work often opened shops and helped initiate social and political community associations. Indians were less likely to settle permanently because of wage differentials. Due to the majority of early South Asian immigrants being lascars, the earliest South Asian communities were found in port towns.

The small, often transitory presence of Lascars continued into the 1930s, with the Port of London Authority mentioning Lascars in a February 1931 article writing that "Although appearing so out of place in the East End, they are well able to look after themselves, being regular seamen who came to the Docks time after time and have learnt a little English and know how to buy what they want.

In 1932, the Indian National Congress survey of 'all Indians outside India' estimated that there were 7,128 Indians in the United Kingdom. It is estimated that from 1800 to 1945, 20,000 South Asians emigrated to Britain.

There was further significant migration after World War II, particularly from the Punjab in India, Mirpur in Pakistan and the Sylhet region of Bangladesh. The Commonwealth Immigrants Act was passed in 1962 and restricted this.

=== 21st century ===
In 2020, South Asian Heritage Month was set up as an annual awareness month by co-founders Jasvir Singh (barrister) and Dr Binita Kane to celebrate South Asian identity in the UK and beyond. The 2020 George Floyd protests had sparked solidarity and support from British South Asians in support of black British protest movements. In 2021, South Asian campaigners petitioned the Department for Education to include the Partition of India in the UK's national curriculum.

== Population history ==
=== 2021 Census - foreign born population ===
The figures below represent data collected for the 2021–2022 United Kingdom censuses with the country as a reported birthplace recorded. This does not include British born people of South Asian or primarily South Asian descent.

State/Territory	England (2021)	Scotland (2022)	Wales (2021)	Northern Ireland (2021)	United Kingdom (2021/22)
India	906,962	37,729	13,399	6,910	965,000
Pakistan	616,454	28,891	7,103	1,235	653,683
Bangladesh	266,290	4,063	6,752	629	277,734
Sri Lanka	141,861	2,707	2,435	192	147,195
Afghanistan	84,877	2,331	816	73	88,097
Nepal	77,349	2,478	1,271	270	81,368
Other South Asia	1,117	50	36	-	1,203
Total	2,094,910	78,249 (Note: (error of total being 3 less than the sum of its subcategories found in original data at source))	31,812	9,309	2,214,280

The data above tabulates country of birth regardless of ethnicity.

== Social and political issues ==
=== Community and sport ===
In 2020, Amar Cymru, or My Wales, was established in consultation with Football Association of Wales to give the group a larger voice over the Wales national football team and provide stadium experiences for South Asians in Wales.

In 2021, West Ham United became the first Premier League football club to specifically appoint a South Asian academy mentor to engage with the "more than 325,000 South Asians" living in the "London Boroughs of Newham, Redbridge, Tower Hamlets, Barking and Dagenham and Havering". England coach Gareth Southgate has spoken of a need for more South Asians in the sport nationally. In 2022, figures from the Professional Footballers' Association highlighted this further with the findings that 0.45 percent of academy players were South Asian.

In 2021, Bristol City F.C. signed their first-ever South Asian British player.

In 2021, the England and Wales Cricket Board found that state-educated South Asian Britons were 34 times less likely to become professional cricketers than privately educated players from the White British census ethnic group.

=== Health ===
In 2018, research from the University of Surrey showed that South Asian people in Britain had low-levels of Vitamin D intake in a national context.

In the UK, women of South Asian heritage are the least likely to attend breast cancer screening. Research is still needed to identify specific barriers for the different South Asian communities. For example, a study showed that British-Pakistani women faced cultural and language barriers and were not aware that breast screening takes place in a female-only environment.

A 2020 study found that UK residents of South Asian heritage were the most likely group to die from COVID-19 after being admitted to hospital. The following year, a study published in The Lancet suggested that South Asians were at the greatest risk of infection, hospitalisation or death from the second wave of the pandemic when compared with other ethnic groups in Britain.

== See also ==
- Central Asians in the United Kingdom
- East Asians in the United Kingdom
- Southeast Asians in the United Kingdom
- British Asian
- Britons in India
