= Central Asians in the United Kingdom =

Central Asians living in the United Kingdom

Total population
- Ethnic Central Asians: 3,661 (England and Wales only, 2021); Other estimates: At least 98,764; Afghan (88,097), Kazakh (5,432), Uzbek (2,864), Kyrgyz (1,132), Turkmen (784), Tajik (455), Other Central Asians (Unknown); All figures are the 2015 UN population estimates for the United Kingdom

Regions with significant populations
- London

Languages
- West/Central Asian language (all other) – 9,869 (including Kazakh language, Kyrgyz language, Tajik language, Turkmen language, Pashto language, and Uzbek language); Number of speakers in England & Wales as a main language, of all usual residents aged 3 and over, from the 2021 census.

Religion
- Islam, Non-religious, others

Central Asians in the United Kingdom are Central Asians living in the United Kingdom. They have been present in the country since the 21st century and primarily originate from the countries Afghanistan, Kazakhstan, Kyrgyzstan, Tajikistan, Turkmenistan, and Uzbekistan.

== Population history ==
The UK Government considers the Central Asian sovereign states to be Afghanistan, Kazakhstan, Kyrgyzstan, Tajikistan, Turkmenistan and Uzbekistan. According to United Nations population estimates conducted in 2015, there are over 10,000 Central Asian people residing in the United Kingdom. In 2001, Nooralhaq Nasimi founded the Afghanistan and Central Asian Association (ACAA) in London, which seeks to specifically help Afghan, as well as Central Asian refugees settle in the UK.

=== 2021 Census ===
The figures below represent data collected for the 2021 United Kingdom census with the country as a reported birthplace recorded (i.e. does not include British born people of Central Asian origin). The census in Scotland was delayed for a year and took place in 2022.

State/Territory	England (2021)	Scotland (2022)	Wales (2021)	Northern Ireland (2021)	United Kingdom (2021/22)
Afghanistan	84,877	2,331	816	73	88,097
Kazakhstan	5,604	1,067	128	72	–
Uzbekistan	3,789	1,067	47	21	–
Kyrgyzstan	1,364	1,067	37	0	–
Other Central Asia	1,557	1,067	22	–	–
Total	97,191	3,398	1,050	166	101,805

== Subgroups ==
=== Afghans ===
The Office for National Statistics (ONS) estimates that there were 79,000 people born in Afghanistan living in the UK in 2019. This has risen to 85,693 in the 2021 census for England and Wales and 116,167 who stated their ethnicity as Afghan under the Asian and Other ethnic groups.

=== Kazakhs ===
The UN has estimated that there are 5,432 Kazakhs living in the United Kingdom, as of 2015. In 2009, it was reported that Kazakh entrepreneurs were achieving high positions in British industry. Kazakh politician Dariga Nazarbayeva is a part-time resident in London. In 2011, Kazakh businessman Mukhtar Ablyazov was granted asylum in the UK, along with his wife and children. In 2018, a Kazakh TV-feature reported how ethnic Kazakhs in the UK preserved their culture and language while living as part of the diaspora.

Kazakhs have studied at British schools and universities since at least 2006. In the 2006/2007 school year, private school Haileybury and Imperial Service College had 14 Kazakh students. In 2020, it was reported that the UK was the most popular destination of Kazakhstan's Bolashak Programme, allowing the majority of its students to reside and study in Britain.

=== Kyrgyz ===
Between 1997 and 2002, Kyrgyz diplomat Roza Otunbayeva resided in London, England, serving as the Central Asian nation's ambassador to the UK. In 2007, the Israeli Government helped support an appeal against the deportation of Kyrgyz nationals from the United Kingdom. The refugees, who were orphaned twin sisters and resided in Birmingham, England, were claiming asylum in the country. Kyrgyz former politician Maxim Bakiyev is a resident in the United Kingdom. In 2015, the UN estimated there were 1,132 Kyrgyz residents in the UK.

=== Tajiks ===
In 2013, Tajik child care workers gained temporary residency in the UK, travelling to Falkirk, Scotland for professional training in their field. The sharing of modern child care techniques was administered by Falkirk Council and funded by an EU-backed scheme. By 2015, the UN had estimated a total population of 455 Tajiks in the country.

=== Turkmens ===
In 2015, the UN estimated that there were 784 Turkmens residing in the United Kingdom.

=== Uzbeks ===
The second largest national subgroup of Central Asians after Kazakhs, the United Nations estimated a total population of 2,864 Uzbeks living in the United Kingdom in 2015.

== See also ==
- Afghans in the United Kingdom
- Asian Americans
- Asian Australians
- Asian Canadians
- Asian New Zealanders
- British Asians
- British East and Southeast Asian
- British Turks
- East Asians in the United Kingdom
- Southeast Asians in the United Kingdom
