= Vietnamese people in the United Kingdom =

Ethnic group

Vietnamese in the United Kingdom Người Việt tại Vương quốc Anh
Total population
- Ethnic Vietnamese: 37,458 (England and Wales only, 2021); Born in Vietnam; 28,000 (ONS estimate, 2014)

Regions with significant populations
- London, Birmingham, Leeds, Manchester

Languages
- Vietnamese, British English, languages of the United Kingdom

Religion
- Primarily Vietnamese folk religion, Mahayana Buddhism, Confucianism, with some Christianity (Roman Catholicism, etc.)

Related ethnic groups
- Vietnamese people, Vietnamese people in France, Overseas Vietnamese, Southeast Asians in the United Kingdom

Vietnamese people in the United Kingdom or Vietnamese Britons (Vietnamese: Người Việt tại Vương quốc Anh) include British citizens and non-citizen immigrants and expatriates of full or partial Vietnamese ancestry living in the United Kingdom. They form a part of the worldwide Vietnamese diaspora.

== History and settlement ==
Vietnamese immigration to the United Kingdom started during WW2 but more significant numbers immigrated after the end of the Vietnam War in 1975. The UK only accepted a few hundred of the first wave of refugees who were fleeing from the victorious North Vietnamese. However, more than twenty thousand were accepted of a later wave of refugees who left Vietnam following the growing hostilities and border war between China and Vietnam. The hostilities with China resulted in many ethnic Chinese being forced out from Northern Vietnam. As a result the Vietnamese that came to the UK in that period are predominantly of ethnic Chinese background. The Vietnamese Mental Health Services, citing old reports from the 80s or 90s, identified the inability to speak English or being able to understand it in written form as an obstacle to gaining access to health services. A study by Refugee Action showed that during the years leading up to 1993, the majority of Vietnamese British people were in local authority housing.

== Demographics ==
=== Population ===
The 2001 UK Census recorded 23,347 people born in Vietnam, with over 65% of these originated in Northern Vietnam. A study published in 2007 reported that community organisations estimated that there were at least 55,000 Vietnamese in England and Wales, and that 20,000 of these people were undocumented migrants and at least 5,000 were overseas students. The Office for National Statistics estimates that in 2014, 28,000 people born in Vietnam were resident in the UK.

=== Distribution ===
As with most emerging ethnic groups in the UK, the largest concentrations of Vietnamese people can be found in the larger metropolitan areas and cities, such as London (33,000), with the majority (around 1/3 of all Vietnamese Londoners) being located in Lewisham, Southwark and Hackney. Significant Vietnamese communities also exist in Birmingham (over 4,000), Leeds and Manchester (over 2,500). According to the 2011 census, the cities with the most Vietnam-born residents are London (15,337), Birmingham (1,479), Manchester (865), Nottingham (405), Leeds (374), Northampton (322), Cambridge (259), Newcastle upon Tyne (245), Bristol (220) and Leicester (202).

=== Languages ===
Although the majority of the first Vietnamese immigrants to the UK spoke no English at all, second generation Vietnamese descendants as well as more recent immigrants have a better understanding of the English language. According to Ethnologue, Vietnamese is the main language of 15,200 UK residents.

=== Religion ===
By far the most common religions for Vietnamese people in the UK are Buddhism and Roman Catholicism, which are followed by roughly 80% and 20% (respectively) of the total community's total population. This is roughly in line with the religious breakdown of Vietnam, where 85% of the population are Buddhists and 7% are Roman Catholic.

== Education and employment ==
According to a 2007 study, in the London borough of Lewisham, Vietnamese pupils along with Chinese and Indians outperformed all other ethnic groups. Education and employment statistics for second generation British-born people of Vietnamese origin are largely uncollated.

== Social issues ==
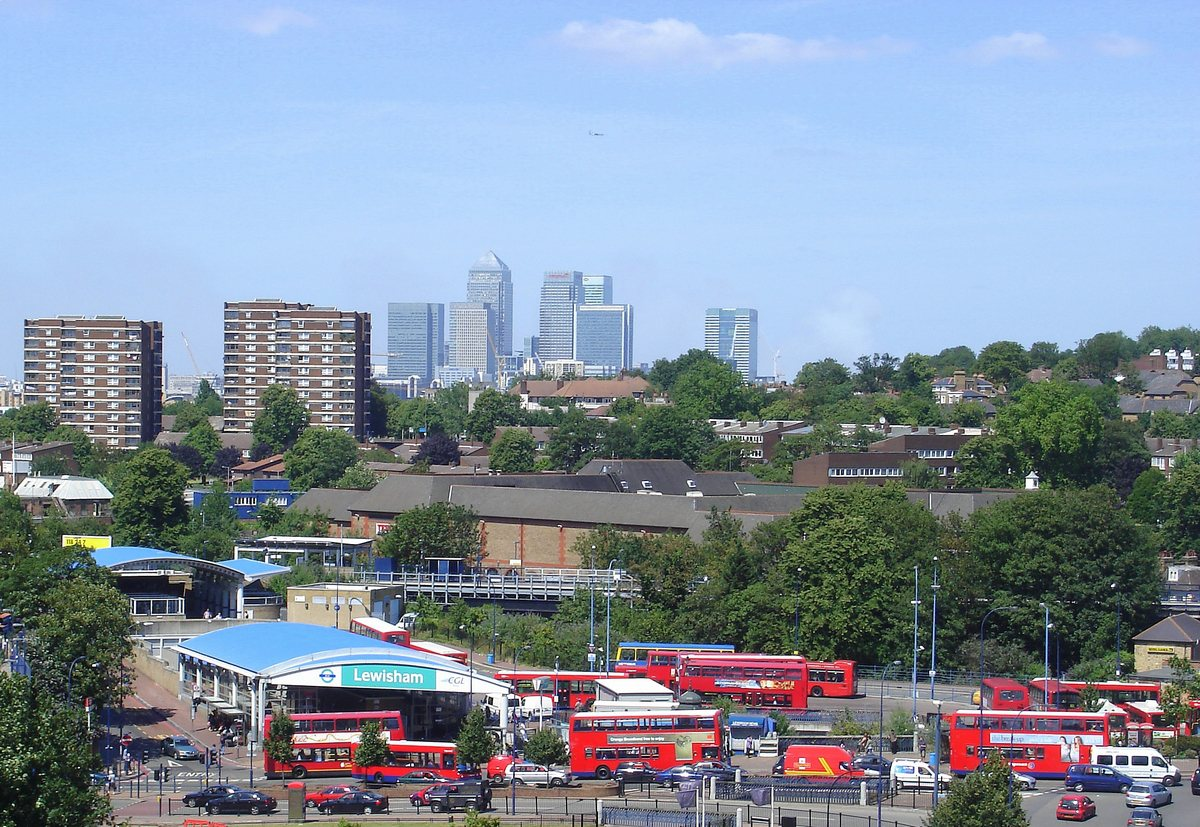
Lewisham in London is home to the UK's largest Vietnamese community, Vietnamese also prevails as the area's second most common language

=== Human trafficking and modern slavery ===
39 Vietnamese migrants were found dead in a lorry trailer on 23 October 2019. The victims consists of mostly teenagers, who travelled in a refrigerator unit, but the refrigeration was not turned on and temperatures rose to 38.5C during the journey. This has sparked huge controversy and uproar. In the first quarter of 2024, Vietnamese became the most common nationality of migrants crossing the English channel by boat, rising rapidly from 505 Vietnamese migrants in 2022 to 1,323 in 2023, to the first quarter of 2024 alone recording 1,060. They were the fourth largest nationality group of migrants crossing the Channel overall in 2024. Some would have paid upwards of £20,000 to trafficking gangs, using borrowed money at interest rates of 1,000 per cent. A 2023 investigation found that the majority of people being smuggled were from the province of Nghe An. In response, in 2024 the Home Office launched a targeted social networking campaign to deter Vietnamese nationals from illegally migrating to the UK. The number of Vietnamese nationals crossing the Channel in small boats halved between the first half of 2024 and the first half of 2025. In October 2025, the governments of the UK and Vietnam reached an agreement to reduce illegal migration and speed up and streamline the process of removal and return of migrants lacking the right to be in the UK to Vietnam.

== Notable people ==
- Aoife Hinds, actress
- Huong Keenleyside, novelist
- Uyen Luu, chef, food writer and photographer
- Jane March, film actress and former model
- Griff, singer
- Cecile Pin, French-born writer
- Sum Ting Wong, drag performer
- Jonathan Van-Tam, healthcare professional and one of two Deputy Chief Medical Officers for England

== See also ==
- United Kingdom–Vietnam relations
- British East and Southeast Asian
- East Asian people in the United Kingdom
- Vietnamese people
- Overseas Vietnamese
- Notable Britons of Vietnamese descent
