= Southeast Asians in the United Kingdom =

Total population
- England and Wales only: 267,288 – 0.45% (2021): Filipino – 162,138 – 0.27% (2021); Thai – 39,962 – 0.07% (2021); Vietnamese – 37,458 – 0.06% (2021); Malays – 12,872 – 0.02% (2021); Burmese – 7,514 – 0.01% (2021); Indonesians – 7,344 – 0.01% (2021); Does not include any Southeast Asians who may be in the 'Other Ethnic Group' as provided by the Office for National Statistics for the 2021 census.

Regions with significant populations
- London, Belfast, Liverpool, Manchester, Oxford, Cambridge, Glasgow, Edinburgh

Languages
- Tagalog/Filipino – 60,899; Thai – 22,966; Vietnamese – 18,518; Malay – 8,014; Number of speakers in England and Wales as a main language, of all usual residents aged 3 and over, from the 2021 census.

Religion
- Buddhism, Christianity, Islam, Non-religious, others

Related ethnic groups
- Asians

Southeast Asians have lived in the United Kingdom for several centuries, arriving from Southeast Asia and primarily originating from countries and territories such as the Philippines, Malaysia, Indonesia, Burma, Singapore, Thailand and Vietnam.

== Population history ==
Southeast Asian is not a category used in official statistics in the United Kingdom, but has been considered as a particular ethnic identity, including by the Foreign and Commonwealth Office, and Southeast Asians have been studied academically as a distinct group.

The country had a small population of Filipinos, Singaporeans and Malaysians until the late 20th century. The number started to grow in the 1970s after the passage of the Commonwealth Immigrants Act and its amendment in 1968 which curtailed extensive rights to immigrate to the UK for Commonwealth citizens. This Act had the effect of more immigration from non-Commonwealth countries, such as the Philippines.

The 2001 UK census recorded 9,924 Burmese-born people residing in the United Kingdom.

=== Country of birth ===
The figures below represent data collected for the 2021 United Kingdom census with the country as a reported birthplace recorded (i.e. does not include British born people of Southeast Asian origin). The census in Scotland was delayed for a year and took place in 2022.

| State/Territory | England (2021) | Scotland (2022) | Wales (2021) | Northern Ireland (2021) | United Kingdom (2021/22) |
|---|---|---|---|---|---|
| Philippines | 149,474 | 6,245 | 5,542 | 3,701 | 164,962 |
| Malaysia | 59,674 | 5,295 | 1,836 | 871 | 67,676 |
| Singapore | 39,637 | 3,725 | 1,287 | 360 | 45,009 |
| Thailand | 47,597 | 3,425 | 2,112 | 725 | 53,860 |
| Vietnam | 36,442 | 1,135 | 772 | 237 | 38,586 |
| Indonesia | 11,858 | 1,441 | 320 | 239 | 13,858 |
| Myanmar | 10,410 | 392 | 214 | 48 | 11,064 |
| Brunei | 4,350 | 390 | 163 | 24 | 4,927 |
| Cambodia | 1,500 | 66 | 33 | 27 | 1,626 |
| Other Southeast Asia | 15,582 | 99 | 108 | – | 15,789 |
| Total | 376,524 | 22,213 | 12,348 | 6,232 | 417,317 |

=== Ethnic group ===
| Ethnic group (Note: Only Southeast Asians who identified under the broad 'Asian, Asian British or Asian Welsh' category are included. Those who identified themselves under the 'Other ethnic group' are excluded.) | England (2021) | Scotland (2022) | Wales (2021) | Northern Ireland (2021) | United Kingdom (2021/22) (Note: Excluding Scotland) |
|---|---|---|---|---|---|
| Filipinos | 155,996 | To be published, only 2011 figures available | 6,142 | 4,449 | 166,587 |
| Thai | 38,279 | To be published, only 2011 figures available | 1,683 | 373 | 40,335 |
| Vietnamese | 36,643 | To be published, only 2011 figures available | 815 | 117 | 37,575 |
| Malay | 12,407 | To be published, only 2011 figures available | 466 | 143 | 13,016 |
| Burmese/Myanma | 7,338 | To be published, only 2011 figures available | 177 | 18 | 7,533 |
| Indonesian | 7,145 | To be published, only 2011 figures available | 199 | 124 | 7,468 |
| Total | 257,808 | TBC | 9,482 | 5,224 | 272,514 |

== In media ==
In 2008, ABS-CBN reported that acting parts in the British film industry were rare for Southeast Asian British people.

== Subgroups ==
- Southeast Asians
  - Burmese
  - Filipinos
  - Indonesians
  - Malaysians
  - Singaporeans
  - Thais
  - Vietnamese

== See also ==
- British Asians
- British East and Southeast Asian
- East Asians in the United Kingdom
- Central Asians in the United Kingdom
- Asian Americans
- Asian Australians
- Asian Canadians
- Asian New Zealanders
