= ESEA =

ESEA may refer to:

- East and Southeast Asia, a modern term for the Far East
- In the UK, an alternative to British East and Southeast Asian (or BESEA)
- Elementary and Secondary Education Act, a 1965 United States federal statute considered the most far-reaching federal legislation affecting education ever passed by Congress
- ESEA League, an esports competitive video gaming community
