= Malaysians in the United Kingdom =

Total population
- Malaysia-born residents in the United Kingdom: 67,676 (2021/22 Census) (Note: Does not include ethnic Malays born in the United Kingdom or those with ancestry rooted in Malaysia); England: 59,674 (2021); Scotland: 5,295 (2022); Wales: 1,836 (2021); Northern Ireland: 871 (2021); Previous estimates: 75,000 (2017 ONS estimate); Ethnic Malays: 12,872 (England and Wales only, 2021)

Regions with significant populations
- Greater London, South East England

Languages
- British English, Malaysian English, Malay, Malaysian Mandarin, other varieties of Chinese, Tamil

Religion
- Islam, Buddhism, Christianity, Hinduism

Related ethnic groups
- Malaysians, Singaporean British, Oriental British, British Chinese, British Asian, British Indian

Malaysians in the United Kingdom are British citizens who have full or partial Malaysian origin or descent and Malaysian citizens residing in the United Kingdom. The 2001 UK Census recorded 49,886 Malaysian-born people. The 2011 census recorded 62,396 people born in Malaysia living in England, 2,117 in Wales, 4,721 in Scotland and 705 in Northern Ireland. The largest concentrations of Malaysian-born residents were recorded in Greater London (21,209 people) and South East England (11,331). The Office for National Statistics estimates that 75,000 Malaysian-born expatriates were residents in the UK in 2017.

In December 2008, it was reported that over 30,000 Malaysians who entered the UK temporarily had overstayed their visas. In 2013, there were 14,500 Malaysians studying at tertiary level in the United Kingdom, making Malaysians one of the largest overseas student groups in the United Kingdom and making the United Kingdom the country with the 2nd most Malaysian students.

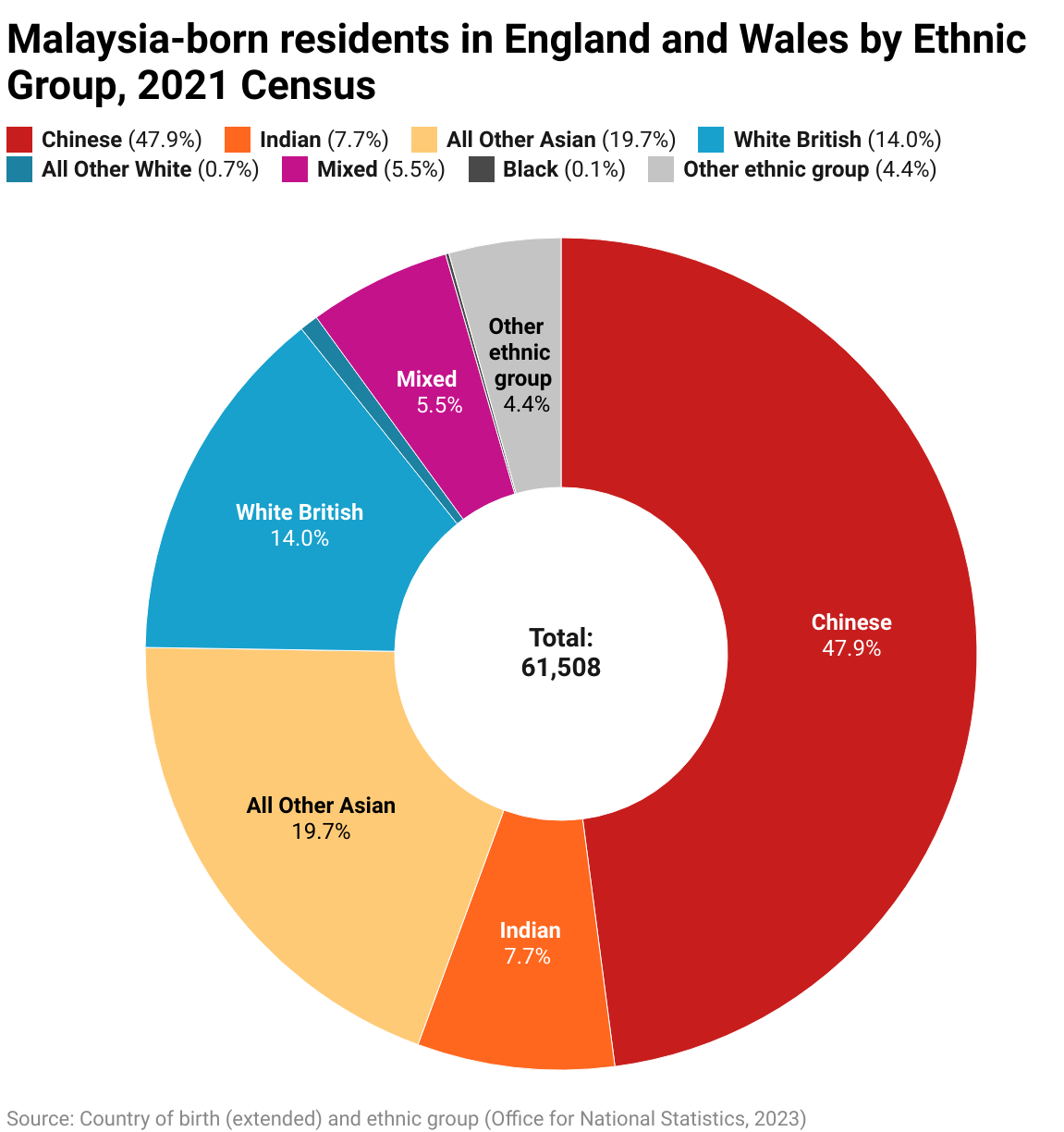
Malaysia-born residents by ethnic group (2021 census, England and Wales)

== Notable people ==
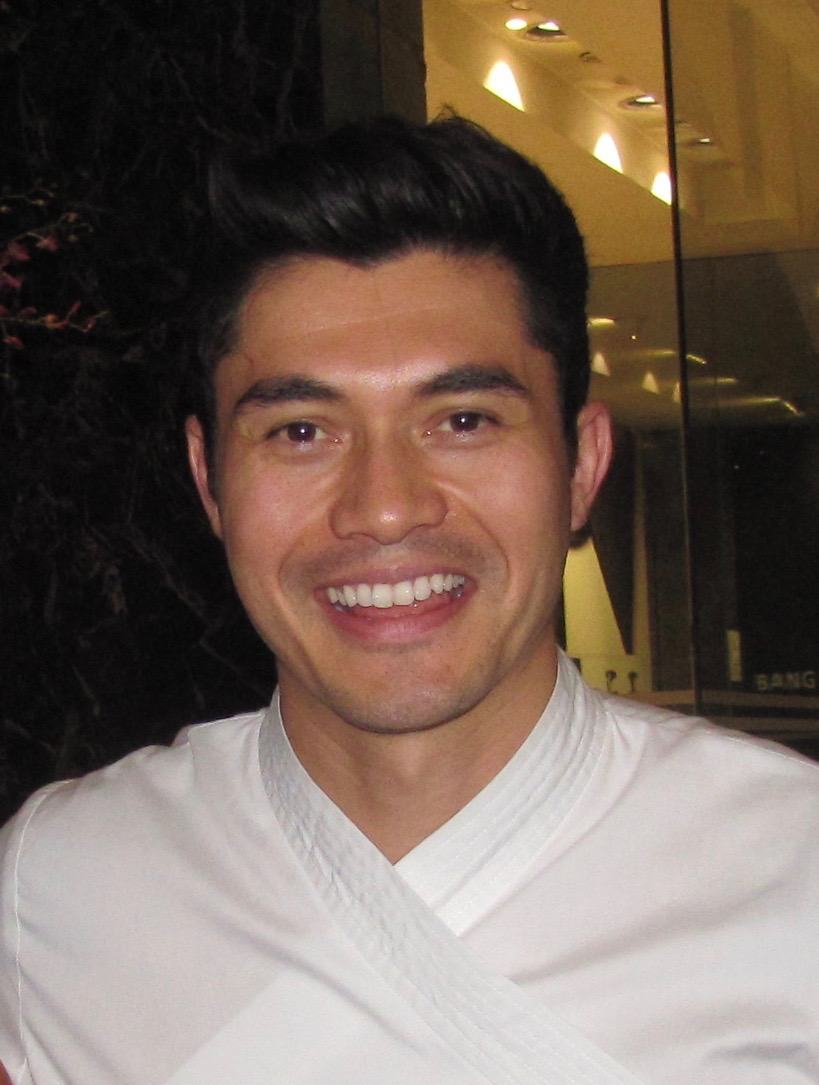
Actor Henry Golding

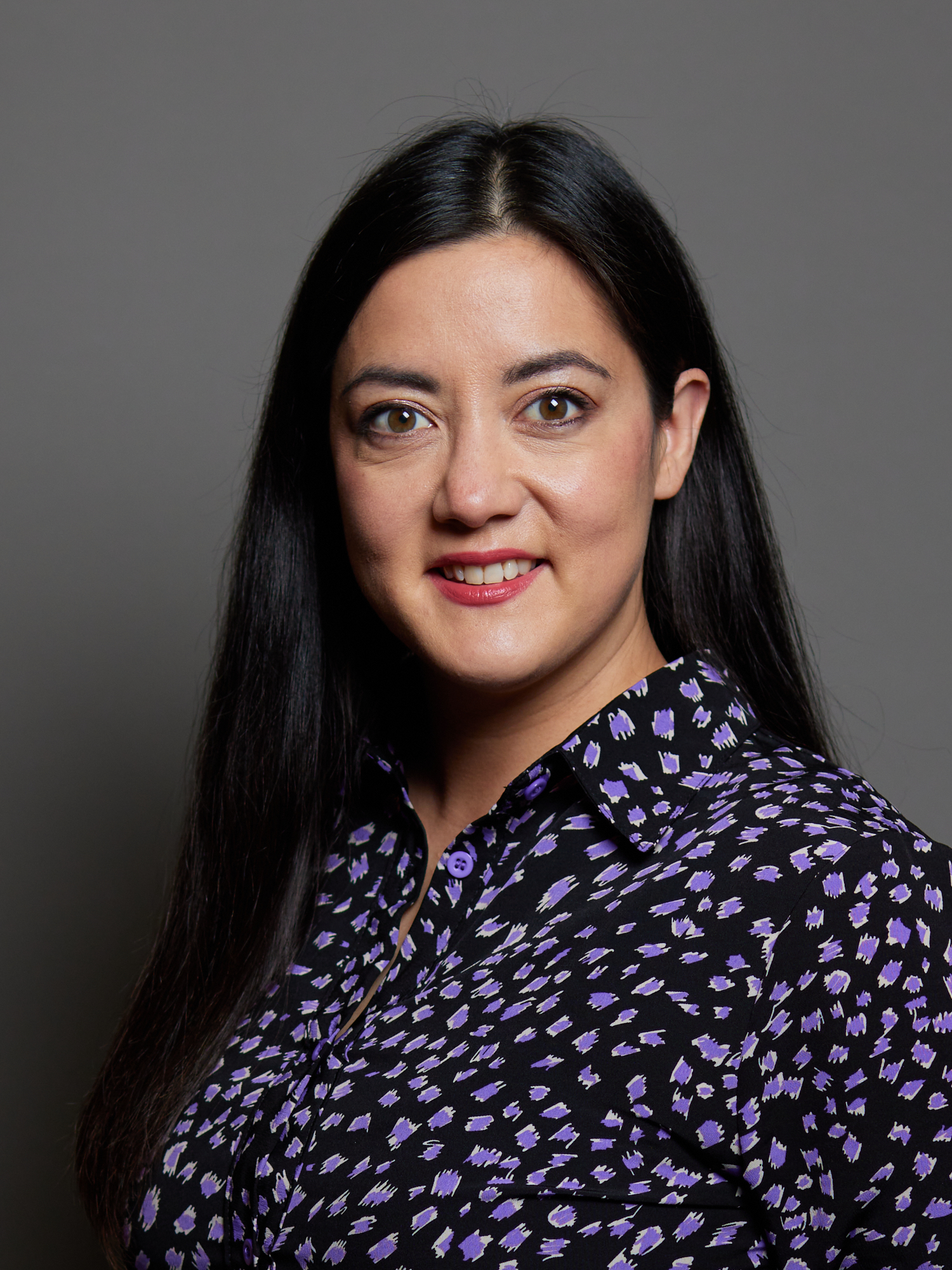
Labour MP Sarah Owen

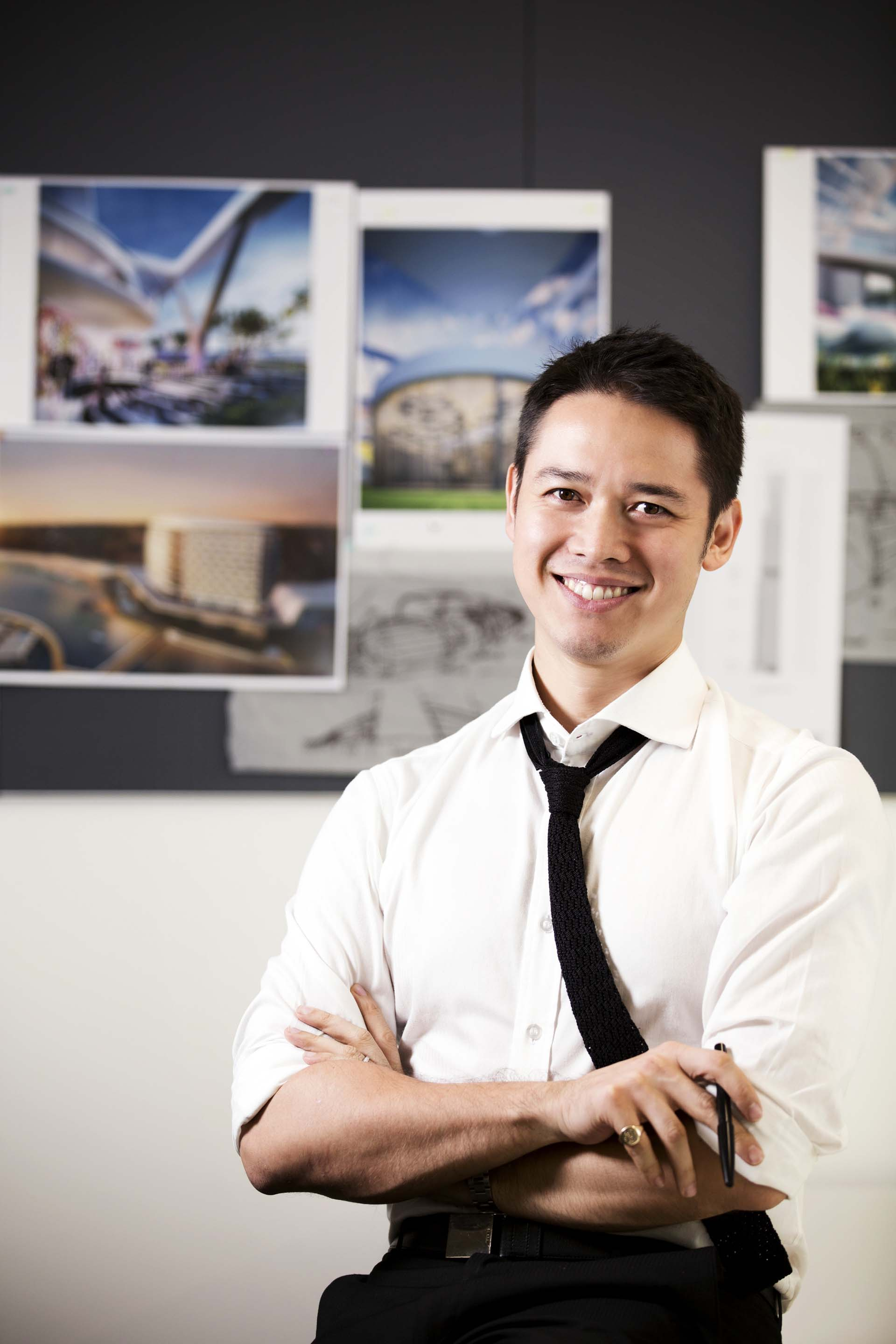
Architect Jason Pomeroy

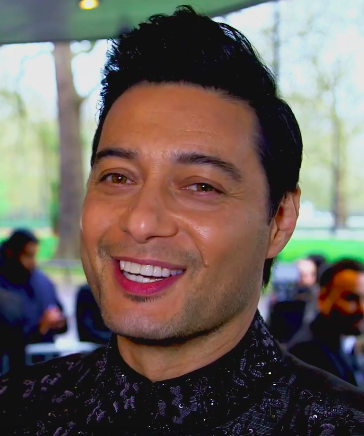
Actor and singer Stephen Rahman-Hughes

This is a list of Malaysian expatriates in the United Kingdom and British citizens of Malaysian origin.

- Tash Aw - author
- Ungku Abdul Aziz - academic
- Betty Boo - singer
- Jimmy Choo - shoe designer
- Nicola Dinan - novelist
- Dave Gahan - lead singer of Depeche Mode
- Henry Golding - actor, model and television host
- Stephen Rahman-Hughes - actor
- Syed Adney Syed Hussein - footballer
- Sultanah Helen Ibrahim - Malaysian royalty
- Christina Jordan - British politician
- Raja Petra Kamarudin - politician
- Sybil Kathigasu - only Malayan woman to be awarded the George Medal for bravery
- Claudia Kellgren-Fozard - YouTube personality
- Jenny Lau - writer and community organiser
- Sherson Lian - Malaysian chef and television host
- Pik-Sen Lim - actress
- Shaun Maloney - Footballer
- Norman Musa - chef/restaurateur
- Ida Nerina - actress
- Nigel Ng - comedian
- Sarah Owen - politician
- Jason Pomeroy - British-Malaysian architect
- Julia Rais - actress and Malaysian princess
- Zuleikha Robinson - English actress and singer
- Elliot Rodger - mass murderer
- Darius Shu - filmmaker
- Arul Suppiah - cricketer
- Elaine Tan - actress
- Nadine Ann Thomas - Miss Universe Malaysia 2010
- Amelia Thripura Henderson - actress, model and television host
- Phil Wang - comedian
- James Wong - ethnobotanist
- Ed Yong - science writer

== See also ==
- Malaysian diaspora
- Malaysia–United Kingdom relations
