= British East and Southeast Asian =

East and Southeast Asians living in the United Kingdom

The terms British East and Southeast Asian (BESEA) or simply East and Southeast Asian (ESEA) are used to refer to people in the United Kingdom (UK) who identify with the cultures and ethnicities of East and Southeast Asia. The 2021 United Kingdom census recorded a total of 834,262 people (1.25% of the total population) who were born in East and Southeast Asian countries (i.e. does not include British born people of East or Southeast Asian origin) residing in the United Kingdom. This was split near evenly with 417,318 from the Southeast Asian region and 416,944 from the East Asian region.

According to organisations who uses this term, this includes Brunei, Cambodia, China, Timor-Leste, Hong Kong (SAR of China), Indonesia, Japan, Korea (North and South), Laos, Malaysia, Mongolia, Myanmar, the Philippines, Singapore, Taiwan, Thailand and Vietnam.

== Introduction ==
The term East and Southeast Asian has emerged in a UK context where the category 'Asian' is predominantly used to refer to those from a South Asian background. It has been adopted to replace the derogatory racialised term 'Oriental'. The term has gained currency following the outbreak of COVID-19 which led to a rise in anti-Asian racial violence and the creation of a number of groups that have organised under the ESEA term. However, pan-ethnic mass mobilisation among East and Southeast Asians in the UK has longer histories – such as Mulan Theatre, New Earth Theatre (formerly Yellow Earth Theatre) and BEATS (British East & South East Asians in the Screen & Stage Industry) in the arts.

A 2020 pilot study of East and Southeast Asian people in the United Kingdom found that close to 95% of respondents identify or feel comfortable with the term British East and Southeast Asian (BESEA) or East and Southeast Asian (ESEA) to describe their identity. In a 2021 article exploring an East and Southeast Asian identity in the Britain, Diana Yeh describes ESEA as a 'pan-Asian' political identity and alliance which has grown out of wider anti-racist organising in Britain.

== COVID-19-related discrimination and racism of ESEA ==
The term East and Southeast Asian was used regularly by personalities, institutions and media reports in relation to discrimination and racism during the COVID-19 pandemic. MP Sarah Owen referred to the term ESEA in parliamentary debates in 2020, while the UK Government condemned attacks on ESEA communities in its response to a petition on the UK Parliament Petition Website which called for more funds to support victims of COVID-19 racism and anti-racism programmes. Academic communities have also discussed this term including studies on COVID-related racism and discussion panels on the experiences of ESEA with discrimination and racism. In 2021, a #StopESEAHate GoFundMe campaign was launched with support from public personalities such as actors Gemma Chan, Benedict Wong and Henry Golding.

== Groups which use the term ==
The term ESEA is used in the names and mission statements of several organisations and initiatives such as:

- Artist Working Group
- Asian Leadership Collective
- Besea.n
- BEATS
- Campaign Against Racism Group
- China Exchange
- Daikon
- Don't Call Me Oriental
- East and Southeast Asians for Labour
- East and Southeast Asians in Scotland
- East and Southeast Asians North East
- Edinburgh University ESEA Queer Society
- End Violence and Racism Against ESEA Communities (EVR)
- ESEA Archives Book Club
- ESEA Artists' Futures
- esea contemporary (formerly Centre for Chinese Contemporary Art)
- ESEA Green Lions
- ESEA Heritage Month
- ESEA Lit Fest
- ESEA Music
- ESEA Online Community Hub
- ESEA Outdoors UK
- ESEA Publishing Network
- ESEA Sisters
- ESEA Young Londoners
- ESEAS Bristol
- Every Asian Voice
- Foundling Productions
- Hackney Chinese Community Services
- Half East Records
- Have you eaten yet? Collective
- Hidden Keileon
- Horizons Collective
- Kakilang (formerly Chinese Arts Now)
- Kanlungan
- kindredpacket
- Liverpool ESEA Network
- Moongate Productions
- New Earth Theatre
- On Your Side
- Papergang Theatre
- Racism Unmasked Edinburgh
- Remember Resist
- Rising Waves
- SOAS dis-Orient Society
- Southeast and East Asian Centre (SEEAC)
- Southeast and East Asian Women's Association (SEEAWA)
- Tan's Topics
- UK Civil Service Race Forum's East and South East Asian (ESEA) Working Group
- Voice ESEA
