= British Chinese =

British people of Chinese descent

- Distribution by local authority in the 2011 census.

Total population
- United Kingdom: 502,216 – 0.8% (2021/22 Census); England: 431,188 – 0.8% (2021); Scotland: 47,075 – 0.9% (2022); Wales: 14,458 – 0.5% (2021); Northern Ireland: 9,495 – 0.5% (2021)

Regions with significant populations
- London; Edinburgh; Glasgow; Manchester; Birmingham; Liverpool; Leeds; Sheffield

Languages
- British English, Cantonese, Mandarin, Min, Hakka, Malay

Religion
- Predominantly irreligious (62.6%); minority follows Christianity (17.2%), Buddhism (9.3%), and other faiths (1.1%) (Note: Including Islam (0.4%), Hinduism (0.1%), Judaism (0.04%), Sikhism (0.02%), Taoism, Chinese folk religion and others); 2021 census, NI, England and Wales only

Related ethnic groups
- Overseas Chinese; Hong Kong Britons; Chinese-Vietnamese Britons; Chinese-Singaporean Britons; Britons in China

British Chinese (traditional Chinese: 英籍華人; simplified Chinese: 英籍华人; pinyin: Yīng jí huárén; Cantonese Yale: Yīng jihk Wàhyàhn), also known as Chinese British or Chinese Britons, are people of Chinese – particularly Han Chinese – ancestry who reside in the United Kingdom, constituting the second-largest group of Overseas Chinese in Western Europe after France.

The United Kingdom has the oldest Chinese community in Western Europe. The first waves of immigrants came between 1842 (the end of the First Opium War) and the 1940s (the end of World War II), largely through treaty ports opened as concessions to the British for the Opium Wars, such as Guangzhou, Tianjin, and Shanghai. British Chinese communities began to form in British ports in Liverpool, London, Cardiff, and Glasgow. In the Liverpool area, by the end of World War II, an estimated 900 Eurasian children were born to Chinese fathers and white mothers.

Since the middle of the 20th century, many British Chinese have been descended from people of former British colonies, such as Hong Kong, Malaysia, and Singapore. This shifted in the late-1970s with new waves of Chinese migrants coming from Vietnam, mainland China, and Hong Kong. Following new national security laws imposed by China onto Hong Kong, the United Kingdom offered a pathway to citizenship for British National (Overseas) status holders residing in Hong Kong – the majority of whom are ethnically Chinese. Two years since the introduction of the BN(O) visa immigration route in 2021, 144,500 Hong Kongers have arrived in the United Kingdom.

According to the 2021 Census, the Chinese ethnic group numbered 502,216, or 0.8% of the United Kingdom population. British Chinese live in every major British city, most notably including London, Edinburgh, Glasgow, Manchester, Birmingham, Liverpool, Leeds, Sheffield and Cambridge. Compared with most other ethnic minorities in the UK, the Chinese are amongst the most geographically dispersed. The six cities of Birmingham, Glasgow, Liverpool, London, Manchester, and Newcastle upon Tyne host Chinatowns.

Overall, as a demographic group, the British Chinese are amongst the highest income earners, the highest academic achievers and the least likely to receive any welfare support from the government. They also place well on socioeconomic metrics with the lowest arrest and incarceration rates, lowest overweight or obesity rates, and the lowest school suspension rates.

== Terminology ==
The term "Asian" in the United Kingdom usually refers to those of South Asian heritage, such as Indians, Pakistanis, Bangladeshis, Sri Lankans and Kashmiris. Furthermore, although Chinese have a long history of settling in the United Kingdom, the 1991 census was the first to introduce a question on ethnicity; earlier censuses only recorded country of birth. In the 2001 census, Chinese was not included in the broad 'Asian or Asian British' category, but in the 'Chinese or other ethnic group' category instead. The 'Chinese or other ethnic group' category continues to be used by some public bodies and governmental departments, with those who identify as Chinese not counted under the 'Asian or British Asian' category. In the 2011 census, the question for ethnic group allowed for the option of "Chinese" for England, Wales, and Northern Ireland, and "Chinese, Chinese Scottish or Chinese British" for Scotland.

The terms "British-born Chinese" (BBC) and "Scottish-born Chinese" (SBC) have become common ways of describing ethnic Chinese who were born in the United Kingdom. However, the newer term of "British Chinese" began to emerge in the 1990s as a way to articulate a bicultural identity. Diana Yeh argues that the term is also a means to negotiate and offer agency to individuals often rejected as not being "British" or "Chinese" enough, yet also not being as visible as "Black" or "Asian" ethnic minorities. Along with the term "British Chinese," there has been an increasing use of more inclusive umbrella terms such as "British East Asian" (BEA) and "British East and Southeast Asian" (BESEA), especially in the arts sector and in the face of racism during the COVID-19 pandemic.

== History ==
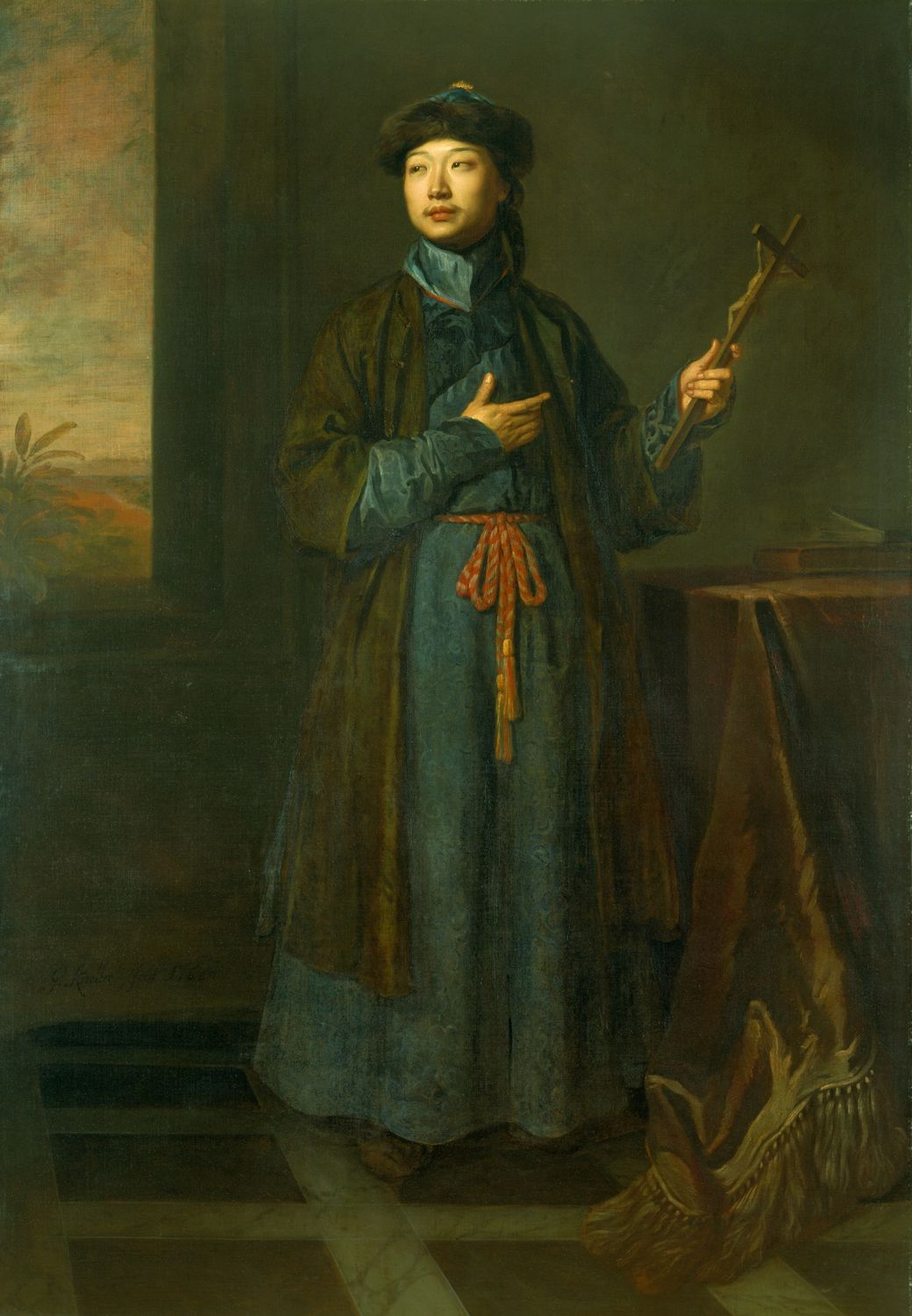
Shen Fu-Tsung was the first ever recorded ethnic Chinese person to set foot in what is now the United Kingdom, having visited over 300 years ago in 1685

Britain has been receiving ethnic Chinese migrants more or less uninterruptedly on varying scales since the 19th century. While new immigrant arrivals numerically have replenished the Chinese community, they have also added to its complexity and the already existing differences within the community. Meanwhile, new generations of British-born Chinese have emerged.

=== First Chinese ===
The first recorded Chinese person in Britain was Shen Fu Tsong (c. 1657 – 1691), a Jesuit scholar who was present in the court of King James II in the 17th century. Shen was the first person to catalogue the Chinese books in the Bodleian Library. The King was so taken with him he had his portrait painted by Sir Godfrey Kneller and hung it in his bed chamber. The portrait of Shen is in the Royal Collection; it currently hangs in Windsor Castle.

William Macao (c. 1753 – 1831) was the earliest recorded Chinese person to settle in Britain. He lived in Edinburgh, Scotland from 1779. Macao married a British woman and had children, and was the first Chinese person to be baptised into the Church of Scotland. He worked for the Board of Excise at Dundas House, St Andrew Square, Edinburgh for 40 years, beginning as a servant to the clerks and retiring as Senior Accountant. He was involved in a significant naturalisation law case and for two years, until the first decision was overturned on appeal, was legally deemed a naturalised Scotsman.

A Chinese man known as John Anthony (c. 1766 – 1805) was brought to London in 1799 by the East India Company to provide accommodation for the Lascar and Chinese sailors in Angel Gardens, Shadwell in London's East End. Antony had left China around 11 years of age in the 1770s making several journeys between London and China. He was baptised into the Church of England, about six years before his death, and anglicised his name, settled in London, and married Ester Gole in 1799. Wishing to buy property, but unable to do so while an alien, in 1805 he used part of the fortune he had amassed from his London work to pay for an Act of Parliament to naturalise him as a British subject; thus being the first Chinese person to gain British citizenship. However, he died a few months after the Act was passed.

=== 1800s to World War II ===
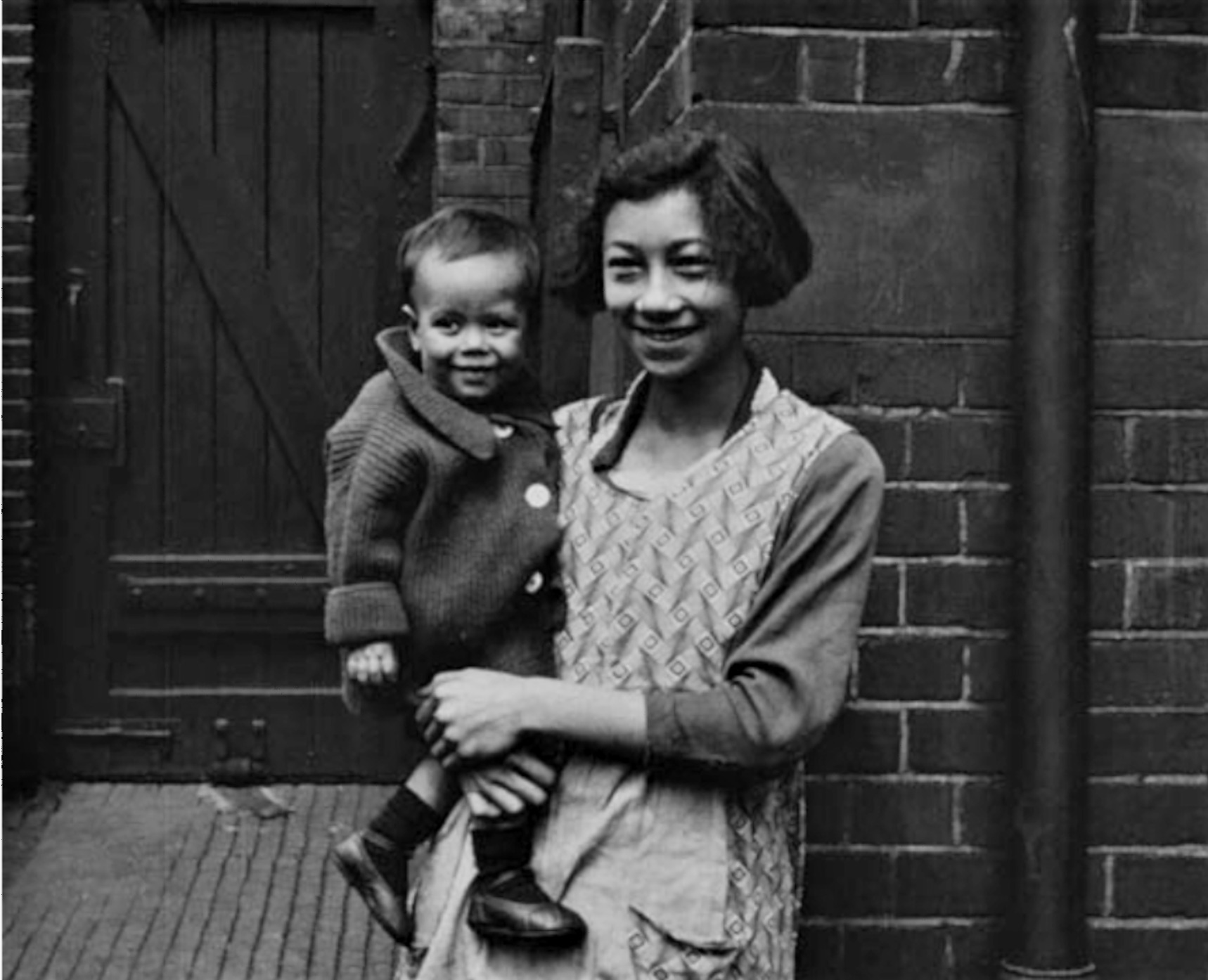
A woman holds a child in Limehouse, East London, 1920s.

Chinese migration to Britain has a history of at least a century and a half. From the 1800s until 1945, it is estimated 20,000 had emigrated to Britain. The British East India Company, which controlled the importation of popular Chinese commodities such as tea, ceramics and silks, began employing Chinese seamen in the middle of the 19th century. Those who crewed ships to Britain had to spend time in the docks of British ports while waiting for a ship to return to China, establishing the earliest Chinatowns in Liverpool and London.

In 1901 there were 387 Chinese people living in Britain, and which grew to 1,219 in 1911. These communities consisted of a transnational and highly mobile population of Cantonese seamen and small numbers of more permanent residents who ran shops, restaurants, and boarding houses that catered for them.

During this time period, mixed marriages between Chinese men and white women were increasingly commonplace in Britain. Such relationships often attracted racist attention. In nineteenth century portside communities, for example, the wives of Chinese men were often given nicknames such as "Canton Kitty" and "Chinese Emma" to ridicule their interracial relationships. Racist attitudes continued into the twentieth century as Chinese men were increasingly vilified and associated with the "Yellow Peril," a racist stereotype that depicts people from East and Southeast Asia as an existential threat to the West.

Yellow Peril imagery was used to shame mixed marriages, portraying Chinese men as a danger to white women and "the purity of the Anglo-Saxon blood".

In World War II as more men were required to crew British merchant ships, the Chinese Merchant Seamen's Pool of approximately 20,000 was established with its headquarters in Liverpool. However, at the end of the war few Chinese who had worked as merchant seamen were allowed to remain in Britain. The British Government and the shipping companies colluded to forcibly repatriate thousands of Chinese seamen, leaving behind British wives and mixed-race children.

More than 50 years later in 2006, a memorial plaque in remembrance for those Chinese seamen was erected on Liverpool's Pier Head.

=== Post-World War II ===
In the 1950s, they were replaced by a rapidly growing population of Chinese from the rural areas in Hong Kong's New Territories. Opening restaurants across Britain, they established firm migration chains and soon dominated the Chinese presence in Britain. In the 1960s and 1970s, they were joined by increasing numbers of Chinese students and economic migrants from Malaysia and Singapore.

Chinese migration to Britain continued to be dominated by these groups until the 1980s, when rising living standards and urbanization in Hong Kong, Singapore and Malaysia gradually reduced the volume of migration from the former British Colonies. After the signing of the Sino-British Joint Declaration in 1984, a new wave of Hong Kong migrants settled in Britain, some of whom were civil servants. Many of these migrants were skilled professionals or business owners, and the migration continued into the 2000s. At the same time in the 1980s, the number of students and skilled migrants from the People's Republic of China began to rise. Since the early 1990s, the UK has also witnessed a rising inflow of economic migrants from areas in China without any previous migratory link to the UK, or even elsewhere in Europe. A relatively small number of Chinese enter Britain legally as skilled migrants. However, most migrants arrive to work in unskilled jobs, originally exclusively in the Chinese ethnic sector (catering, Chinese stores, and wholesale firms), but increasingly also in employment outside this sector (for instance, in agriculture and construction). Migrants who enter Britain for unskilled employment are from both rural and urban backgrounds. Originally, Fujianese migrants were the dominant flow, but more recently increasing numbers of migrants from the Northeast of China have arrived in the UK as well. Migrants now tend to come from an increasing number of regions of origin in China. Some Chinese unskilled migrants enter illegally to work in the black economy, in dangerous jobs with no employment rights, as the Morecambe Bay tragedy of February 2004 showed. Some claim asylum in-country, avoiding deportation after exhausting their appeals.

In July 2020, following the implementation of new national security laws in Hong Kong by China, the United Kingdom offered a pathway to citizenship for British Nationals (Overseas) status holders in Hong Kong – the majority of whom are ethnically Chinese. As of the end of the first quarter of 2024, over 173,500 applications for the BN(O) visa immigration route have been submitted by Hong Kongers and their dependants, over 164,900 visas were granted and around 144,400 people have arrived.

== Demographics ==
British Chinese population by region and country
Region / Country	2021 (Note: 2021/22: England and Wales, Scotland, and Northern Ireland)		2011 (Note: 2011: England and Wales, Scotland, and Northern Ireland)		2001 (Note: 2001: England and Wales, Scotland, and Northern Ireland)		1991 (Note: 1991: Great Britain. Northern Ireland did not record ethnic group data in the 1991 census.)	
Region / Country	Number	%	Number	%	Number	%	Number	%
England	431,165	0.76%	379,503	0.72%	220,681	0.45%	141,661	0.30%
—Greater London	147,520	1.68%	124,250	1.52%	80,201	1.12%	56,579	0.85%
—South East	64,329	0.69%	53,061	0.61%	33,089	0.41%	18,226	0.24%
—North West	54,051	0.73%	48,049	0.68%	26,887	0.40%	17,803	0.26%
—East of England	38,444	0.61%	33,503	0.57%	20,385	0.38%	12,494	0.25%
—West Midlands	33,301	0.56%	31,274	0.56%	16,099	0.31%	9,588	0.19%
—Yorkshire and the Humber	29,589	0.54%	28,435	0.54%	12,340	0.25%	8,177	0.17%
—South West	26,516	0.47%	22,243	0.42%	12,722	0.26%	6,687	0.15%
—East Midlands	22,973	0.47%	24,404	0.54%	12,910	0.31%	7,588	0.19%
—North East	14,442	0.55%	14,284	0.55%	6,048	0.24%	4,519	0.18%
Scotland	47,075 (Note: Scotland held its census a year later after the rest of the United Kingdom due to the COVID-19 pandemic. As a result, data shown is for 2022 as opposed to 2021.)	0.87%	33,706	0.64%	16,310	0.32%	10,476	0.21%
Wales	14,454	0.47%	13,638	0.45%	6,267	0.22%	4,801	0.17%
Northern Ireland	9,495	0.50%	6,303	0.35%	4,145	0.25%	—N/a	—N/a
United Kingdom	502,216	0.75%	433,150	0.69%	247,403	0.42%	156,938 (Note: Figures are for Great Britain only, i.e. excludes Northern Ireland)	0.29%

=== Population ===
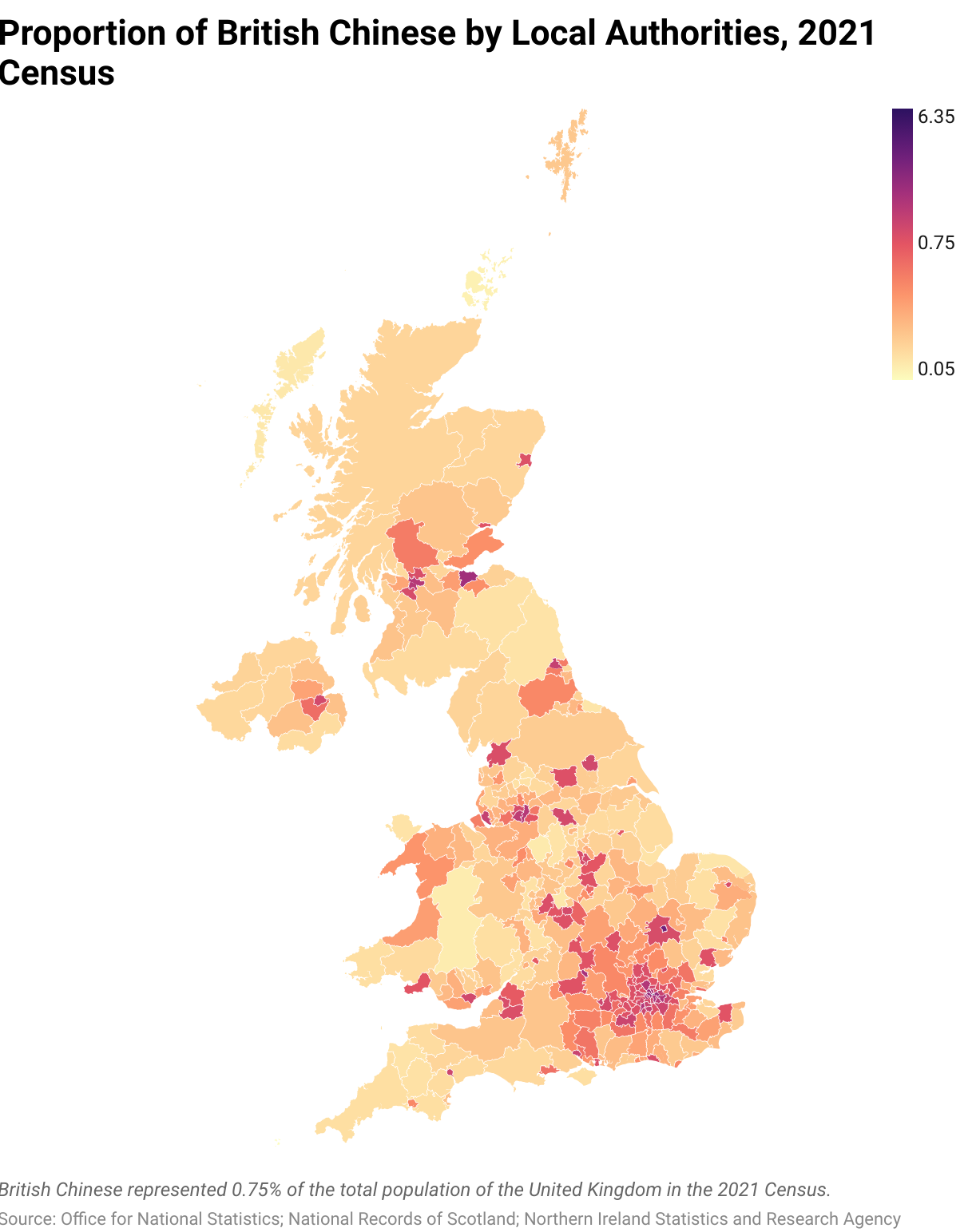
Distribution of British Chinese by local authority, 2021 census

Population pyramid of Asian or Asian British Chinese in 2021 (in England and Wales).

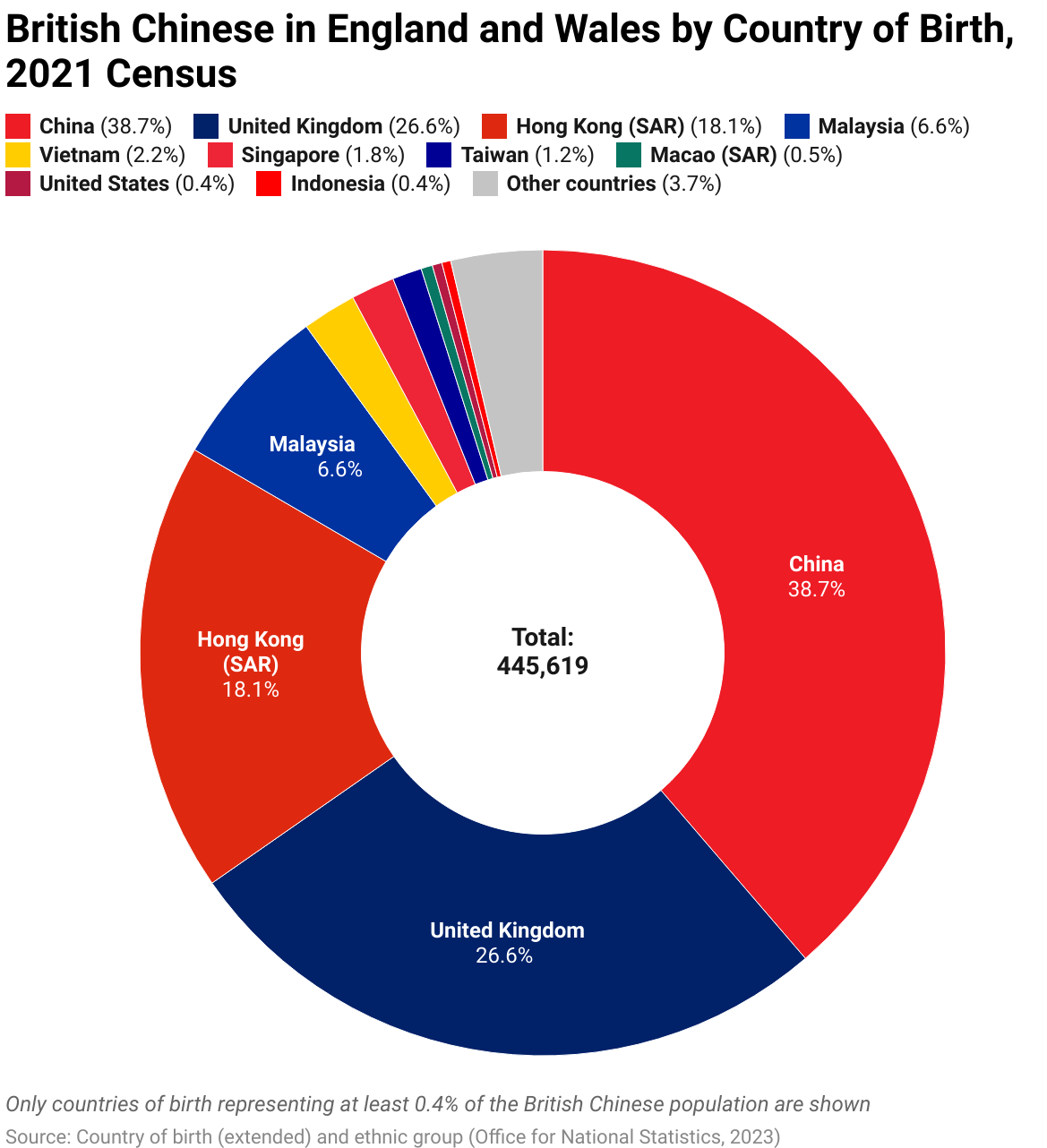
Country of birth (2021 census, England and Wales)

Year of arrival (2021 census, England and Wales)
1. Born in the UK (26.6%)
2. Before 1951 (0.04%)
3. 1951 to 1960 (0.40%)
4. 1961 to 1970 (2.80%)
5. 1971 to 1980 (6.30%)
6. 1981 to 1990 (4.60%)
7. 1991 to 2000 (7.80%)
8. 2001 to 2010 (15.9%)
9. 2011 to 2021 (35.6%)

The 2021 United Kingdom census recorded a population of 502,216 or 0.8% of the population in the United Kingdom. When broken down by country, England recorded 431,188 (0.8%), Wales recorded 14,458 (0.5%) and Northern Ireland recorded 9,495 (0.5%). The equivalent census was recorded a year later in Scotland with a population of 47,075, or 0.9% of the population. The five local authorities with the largest proportion of British Chinese were the City of London (6.35%), Cambridge (4.37%), Tower Hamlets (3.31%), Westminster (3.24%) and Camden (3.20%). The three capitals of the other constituent countries of the United Kingdom held the highest proportion of British Chinese in their respective countries with Edinburgh at 2.93%, Cardiff at 1.38%, and Belfast at 1.37%.

According to the United Kingdom Census 2011, the British Chinese population totalled 433,150, or 0.7% of the population. 393,141 in England and Wales (0.7% of total population), 33,706 in Scotland (0.64% of total population), and 6,303 in Northern Ireland (0.35% of total population). Compared with most ethnic minorities in the UK, the British Chinese tend to be more geographically dispersed. However, significant numbers of British Chinese can be found in Greater London (124,250), spread across a number of its boroughs, with the next four cities with the largest British Chinese populations being Manchester (13,539), Birmingham (12,712), Glasgow (10,689), and Edinburgh (8,076). In Wales, the city with the most British Chinese was Cardiff (4,168) and, in Northern Ireland, it was Belfast (2,378). In England and Wales, 23.7% British Chinese were born in the UK, whereas over half (55.3%) were born in East Asia and 13.4% were born in Southeast Asia.

Top 15 Areas (2021/22 Census)
Local authority	Population	Percentage
Edinburgh	15,076	2.9%
Glasgow	14,300	2.3%
Manchester	12,644	2.3%
Birmingham	12,487	1.1%
Surrey	11,034	0.9%
Tower Hamlets, London	10,279	3.3%
Cambridgeshire	9,594	1.4%
Barnet, London	9,434	2.4%
Hertfordshire	8,950	0.7%
Liverpool	8,841	2.0%
Southwark, London	8,405	2.7%
Oxfordshire	8,249	1.1%
Leeds	8,117	1.0%
Kent	7,656	0.5%
Essex	7,612	0.5%

=== Language ===
Cantonese is the majority Chinese language spoken among British Chinese, with about 300,000 speakers. About 100,000 speak Mandarin Chinese and 10,000 speak Hakka Chinese. The proportion of British Chinese people who speak English as a first or second language is unknown.

=== Religion ===
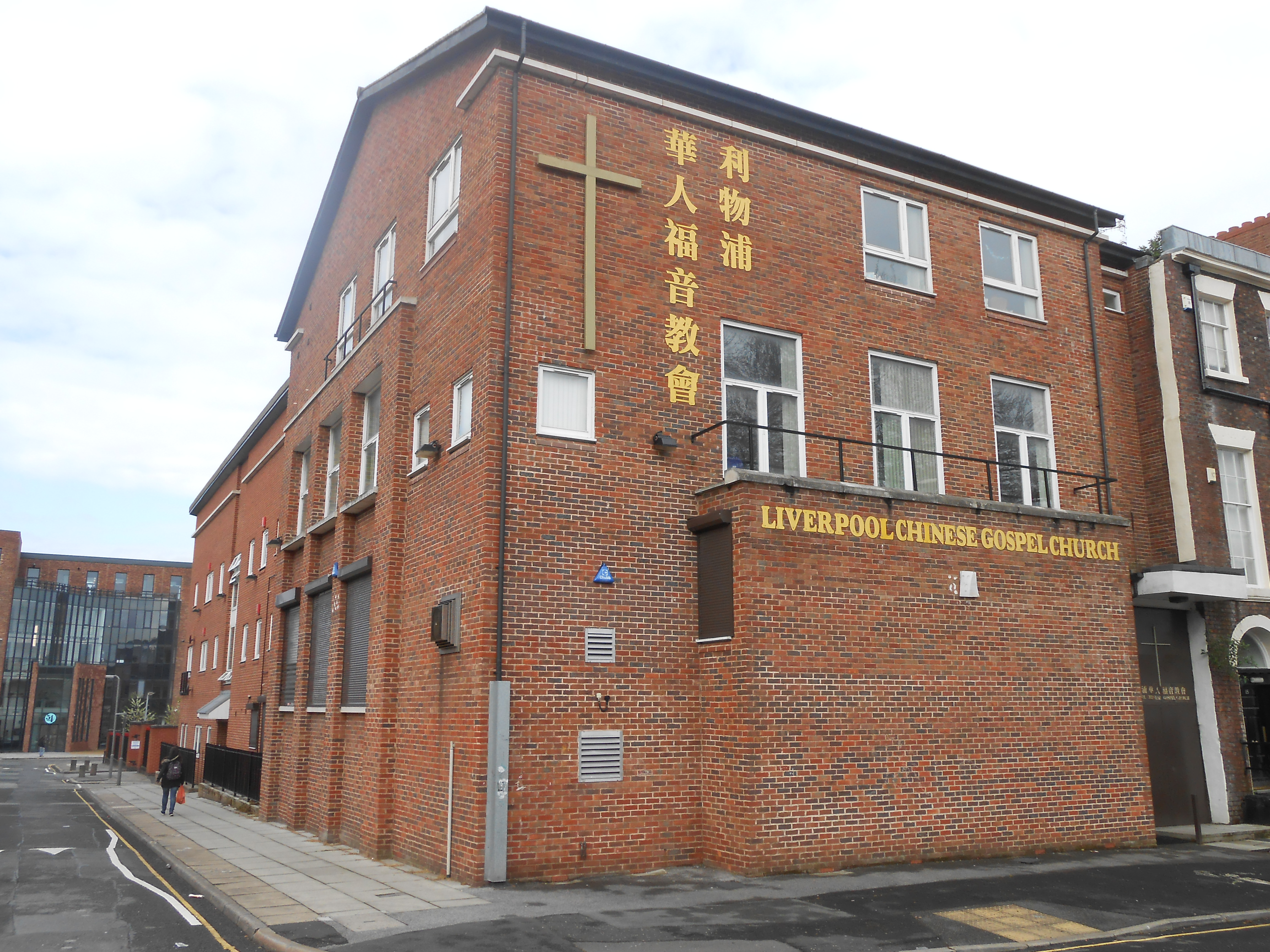
Chinese Gospel Church in Liverpool.

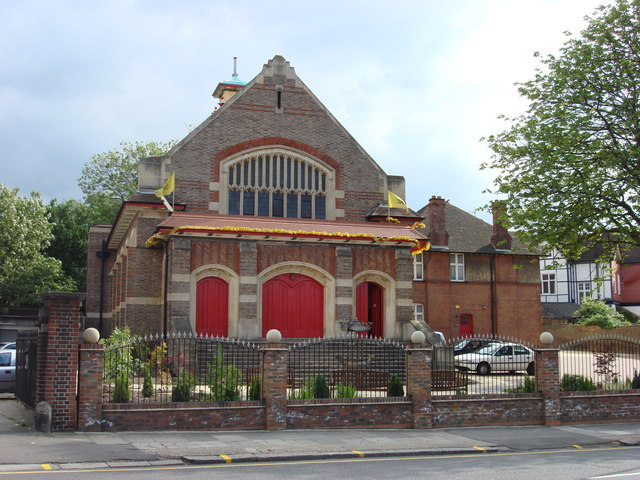
A temple of the True Awakening Tradition of Buddhism in the London Borough of Brent.

Religious Affiliation (Based on Census)
	England and Wales		Scotland	Northern Ireland	
	2011	2021	2011	2011	2021
No religion	55.6%	62.4%	68.6%	73.9%	71.8%
Christianity	19.6%	17.3%	12.2%	14.7%	15.8%
Islam	2%	0.4%	1%	5.9%	0.1%
Buddhism	12.6%	9.5%	9.9%	5.9%	4.3%
Other	1.5%	0.6%	1.3%	5.9%	4.3%
Not stated	8.7%	9.8%	7%	5.5%	7.9%

The 2011 census found that British Chinese were the UK's least religious ethnic minority group, with more than half not identifying with a religious tradition.

The largest religious affiliation is to various forms of Christianity. While the 2011 census in England and Wales has a single category of "Christian," this is broken down more for Scotland (25% Roman Catholic, 26% Church of Scotland, and 49% other Protestant) and Northern Ireland (32% Catholic, 18% Presbyterian Church in Ireland, 10% Church of Ireland, 3% Methodist, and 35% other Protestant). The number of Protestants includes the rise of independent British Chinese churches.

The next largest religious affiliations are Buddhism and Islam. However, Northern Ireland did not include data on Buddhism or Islam in 2011, but included Islam in 2021.

== Community ==
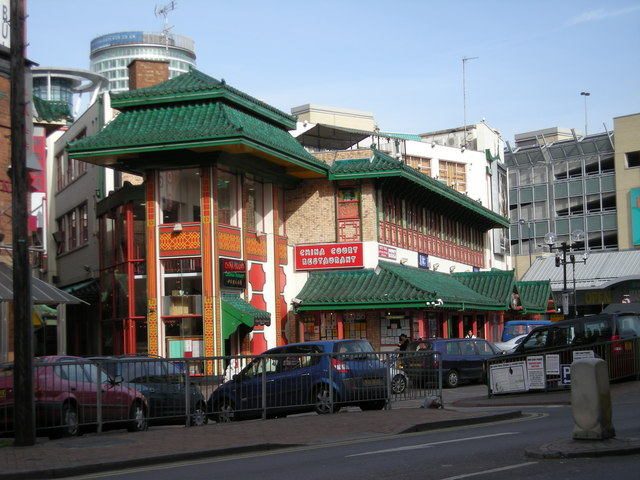
Chinatown in Birmingham

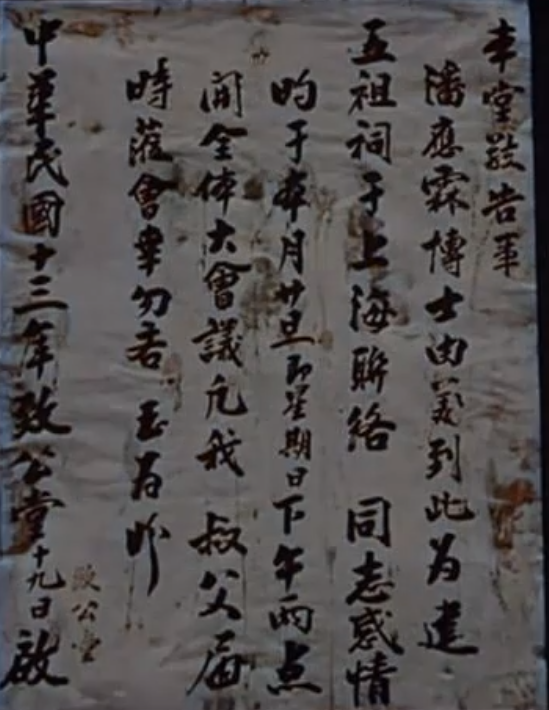
A Chinese language poster calling for a meeting with a visiting Ph.D. Dr. Pan who was there to build an ancestral hall. Limehouse, London, 1924.

Historically, British Chinatowns originated as enclaves of Chinese communities and can be found in many major cities, such as London, Birmingham, Manchester, Liverpool, Newcastle, Sheffield and Aberdeen. Today, Chinatowns have relatively few Chinese people living there, and they have become tourist attractions where Chinese restaurants and businesses predominate.

There exist several organisations in the UK that support the Chinese community. The Chinese community is a non-profit organisation that runs social events for the Chinese community. Dimsum is a media organisation which also aims to raise awareness of the cultural issues that the Chinese community face. The Chinese Information and Advice Centre supports disadvantaged people of Chinese ethnic origin in the UK.

Since 2000, the emergence of Internet discussion sites produced by British Chinese young people has provided an important forum for many of them to grapple with questions concerning their identities, experiences, and status in Britain. Within these online fora and in larger community efforts, the groups may self identify as 'British-born Chinese' or 'BBCs'.

=== London ===
Chinese population in London (2011 Census)

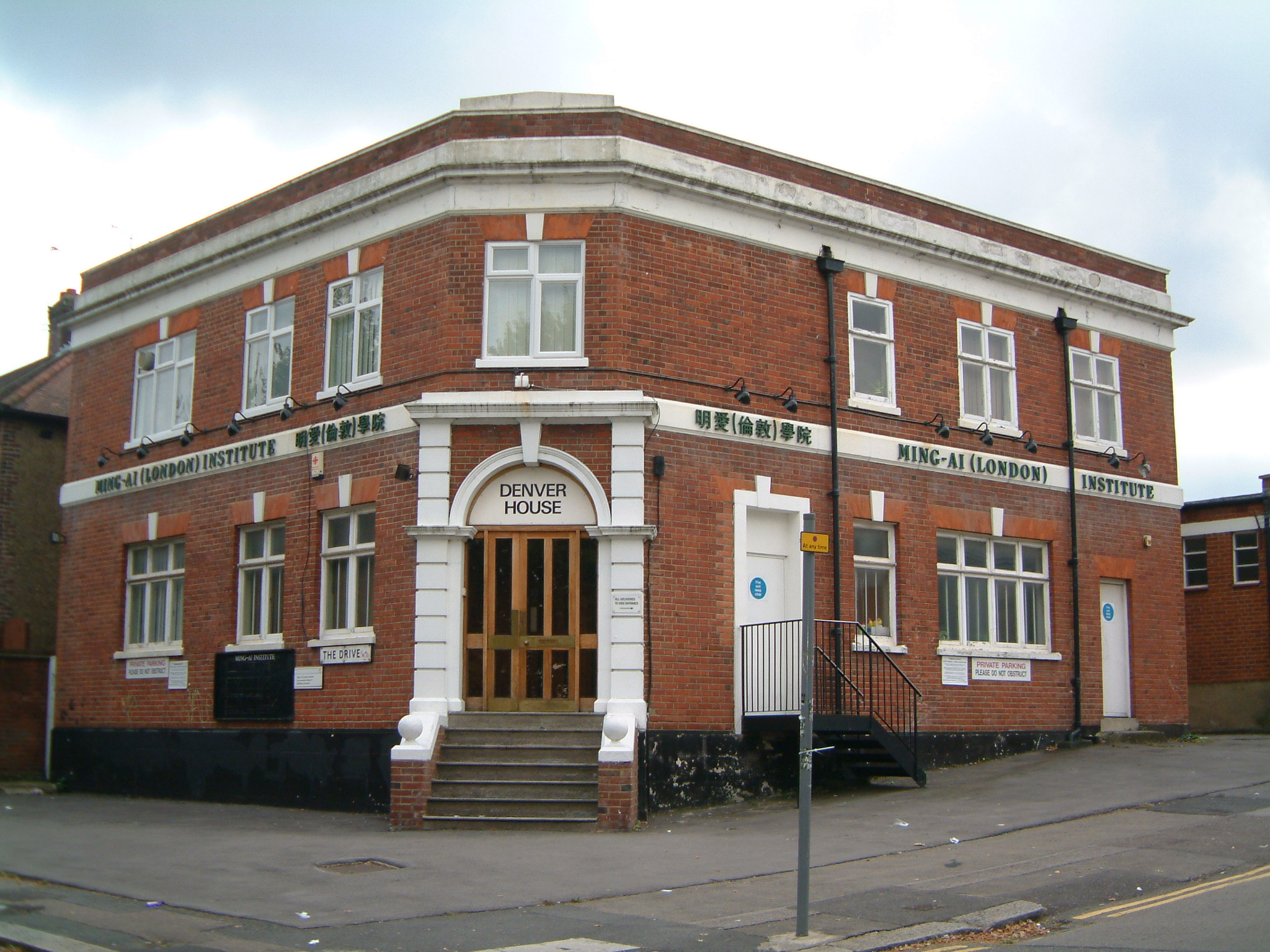
Denver House Bounds Green

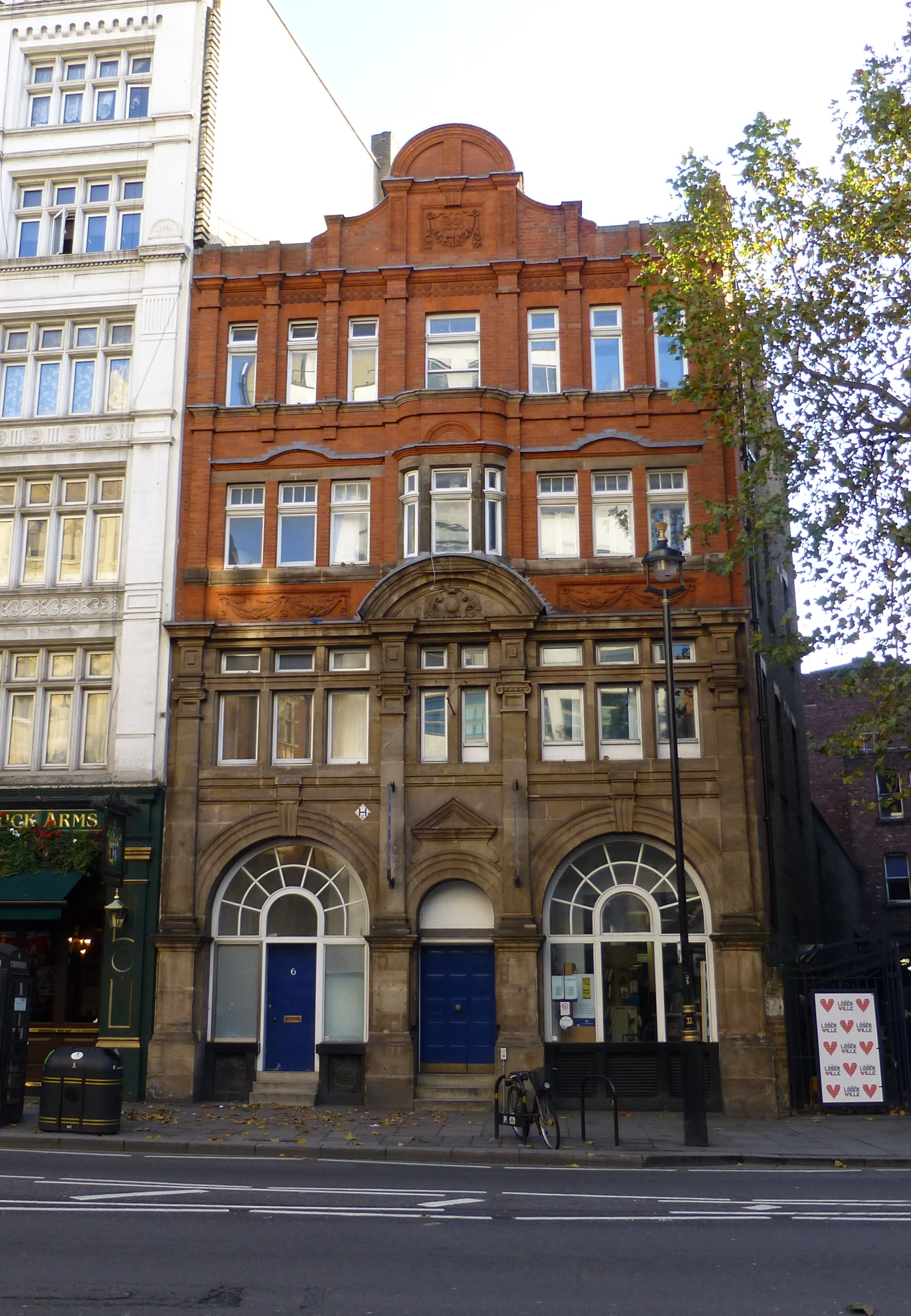
Charing Cross Library

The Chinese population is extremely dispersed, according to Rob Lewis, a senior demographer at the Greater London Authority: "The reason for their thin spread all over London, is because of the idea that you want to set up a Chinese restaurant that's a little way away from the next one." According to the 2011 census, Greater London included 124,250 British Chinese, making up 1.5% of the overall population.

There are Chinese community centres in Chinatown, Kensington and Chelsea, Southwark, Westminster, Camden, Greenwich, Lewisham and Tower Hamlets. Major organisations include the London Chinese Community Centre, London Chinatown Chinese Association, and the London Chinese Cultural Centre.

The Westminster Chinese Library, based at the Charing Cross Library (simplified Chinese: 查宁阁图书馆; traditional Chinese: 查寧閣圖書館; pinyin: Chánínggé Túshūguǎn), holds one of the largest collections of Chinese materials in UK public libraries. It has a collection of over 50,000 Chinese books available for loan and reference to local readers of Chinese; music cassettes, CDs, and video films for loan; community information and general enquiries; a national subscription service of Chinese books; and Chinese events organised from time to time. The library also hosted a photography exhibition in 2013 as part of the British Chinese Heritage project, with photographs and stories of Chinese workers.

Based in Denver House, Bounds Green the Ming-Ai (London) Institute has undertaken a number of heritage and community projects to record and archive the contributions made by British Chinese people to the local communities in the United Kingdom.

Chinese New Year celebrations in London have been celebrated since the 1960s and are famous for colourful parades, fireworks, and street dancing. Other activities include a family show in Trafalgar Square with dragon and lion dances and traditional and contemporary Chinese arts by performers from both London and China. There are fireworks displays in Leicester Square, as well as cultural stalls, food, decorations, and lion dance displays throughout the day in London Chinatown. Due to the COVID-19 pandemic, London's Chinese New Year celebrations in 2021 were shifted online.

The London Dragon Boat Festival is held annually in June at the London Regatta Centre, Royal Albert Docks. It is organised by the London Chinatown Lions Club.

Also held annually in London is the widely acclaimed, British Chinese Food Awards that promotes entrepreneurship, talent and Chinese food across the UK.

== Racism ==
Michael Wilkes from the British Chinese Project said that racism against British Chinese people is not taken as seriously as racism against African, African-Caribbean or South Asian people, and that a lot of racist attacks towards the Chinese community go unreported, primarily because of widespread mistrust in the police.

=== Chinese labourers ===
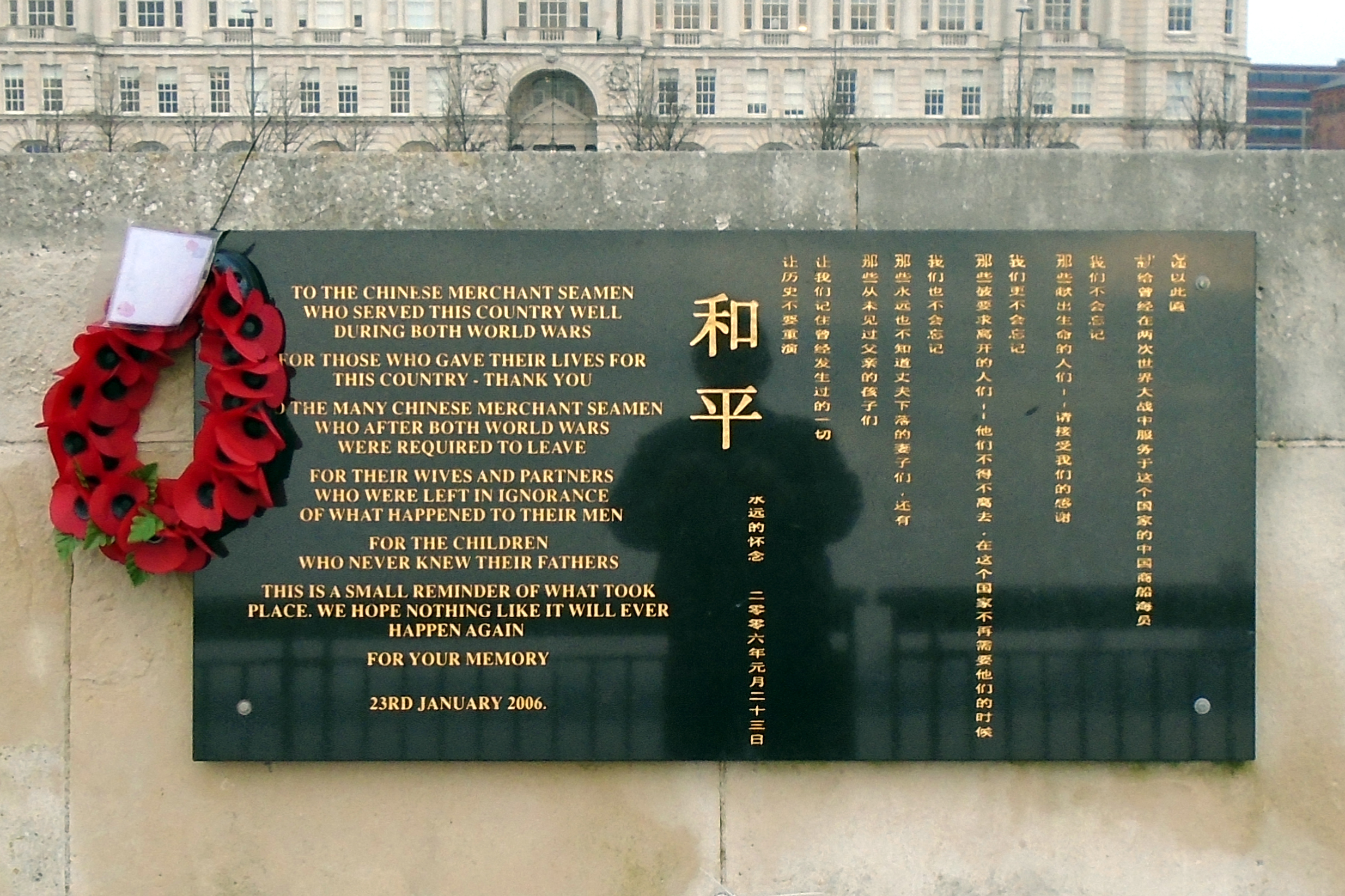
Chinese merchant seamen memorial, Liverpool's Pier Head

From the middle of the 19th century, Chinese were seen as a source for cheap labourers for the building of the British Empire. However, this resulted in animosity against Chinese labourers as competing for British jobs. Hostilities were seen when Chinese were being recruited for work in the British Transvaal Colony (present day South Africa), resulted in 28 riots between July 1904 to July 1905, and later becoming a key debating point as part of the 1906 United Kingdom general election. This would also be the source of the 1911 seamen's strike in Cardiff, which resulted in rioting and the destruction of about 30 Chinese laundries.

While Chinese were recruited to support British war efforts, after the end of the Second World War, the British Government sought to forcibly repatriate thousands of seamen in a Home Office policy HO 213/926 to "Compulsory repatriation of undesirable Chinese seamen." Many of the seamen left behind wives and mixed-race children that they would never see again. A network has also been established for families of Chinese seamen who were repatriated after the Second World War.

=== 2001 Foot-and-mouth outbreak ===
Government reports in early 2001 highlighted the smuggling of illegal meat as a possible source for the 2001 United Kingdom foot-and-mouth outbreak, some of which was destined for a Chinese restaurant. This reportedly resulted in a drop in 40% of trade for Chinese catering businesses throughout some 12,000 Chinese takeaways and 3,000 Chinese restaurants in the United Kingdom, which made up about 80% of the British Chinese workforce at the time. Community leaders saw this as racist and xenophobic, with a scapegoating of the British Chinese community for the spread of the disease.

=== COVID-19 pandemic ===
On 12 February 2020, Sky News reported that some British Chinese said they were facing increasing levels of racist abuse during the COVID-19 pandemic. It was recorded that hate crimes against British Chinese people between January and March 2020 tripled the number of hate crimes in the previous two years in the UK. According to the London Metropolitan Police, between January and June 2020, 457 race-related crimes were committed against British East and Southeast Asians.

Verbal abuse has been one of the common forms of racism experienced by British Chinese. Just before the lockdown in February 2020, British Chinese children recalled experiences of fear and frustration due to bullying and name calling in their schools. According to a June 2020 poll, 76% of British Chinese had received racial slurs at least once, and 50% regularly received racial slurs, a significantly higher frequency than experienced by any other racial minority.

Racism during the pandemic has also impacted a number of Chinese-owned business, especially within the catering business, as well as an increase in violent assaults against British East and Southeast Asians.

British Chinese have sought ways to support one another, especially in response to racism coming out of the pandemic. A grassroots group known as Britain's East and Southeast Asian Network was formed to promote positive representation of the community in the UK. Religious groups have also offered a source of solidarity, such as through British Chinese churches and mainstream churches like the Church of England, the latter through the group The Teahouse.

== Socioeconomics ==
Since the relatively elevated immigration of the 1960s, the Chinese community has made rapid socioeconomic advancements in the UK over the course of a generation. There still exists a segregation of the Chinese in the labour market, however, with a large proportion of the Chinese employed in the Chinese catering industry. Overall, as a demographic group, the British Chinese are well-educated and hold the highest records of academic attainment, least likely to receive any welfare support from the government (including social housing) and earn higher incomes when compared to other demographic groups in the UK. The British Chinese also fare well on many socioeconomic indicators, including the lowest arrest and incarceration rates, the lowest school suspension rates, higher proportions in high socio-economic jobs and high rates of health. Despite this, the Chinese are amongst the most likely ethnicity in the UK to endure racism and face-to-face discrimination. They also hold lower rates of home ownership and are the second least wealthy among major British ethnic groups. In the three-year period to 2022/23, 45% of children in households from a Chinese ethnic group were experiencing child poverty after housing costs.

=== Education ===
The British Chinese community place an exceptionally high value on post-secondary educational attainment; emphasise effort over innate ability; give their children supplementary tutoring irrespective of financial barriers; and restrict their children's exposure to counter-productive influences that might hinder educational attainment via the Confucian paradigm and the sole belief of greater social mobility. The proportion of British Chinese achieving 5 or more good GCSEs stood at a relatively high 70%. According to the 2001 census, 30% of the British Chinese post-16 population are full-time students compared to a UK average of 8%. When it comes to the distinguished category of being recognized as the "paragon immigrants", British Chinese are also more likely to take maths and science-intensive courses such as physics and calculus. A study done by the Royal Society of Chemistry and Institute of Physics revealed that British Chinese students were four times more likely than White or Black students in the United Kingdom to achieve three or more science A-levels. In spite of language barriers, among recent Chinese immigrants to the UK (who do not have English as a first language) 86% of pre-teens reached the required standard of English on the national curriculum exam. The overall result of 86% was one percentage point above the British Indians and remained the highest rate among all ethnic groups in the United Kingdom.

The British Chinese community has been hailed as a socioeconomic "success story" by British sociologists, who have for years glossed over socioeconomic difficulties and inequalities among the major ethnic groups in Britain. The degree educational advantages varies widely however: minorities of European descent fare best, together with the British Chinese. The group has more well-educated members, with a much higher proportion of university graduates than British-born whites. These latter have not been negligible: research has shown that the Chinese as a group face both discrimination and problems accessing public and social services. Many have activated ill-conceived stereotypes of the Chinese as a collectivist, conformist, entrepreneurial, ethnic group, and conforming to Confucian values, which is a divergence of British-Chinese culture and construction of ethnic identity. Educational attainment is greatly espoused by parental reasoning as the British Chinese community cites higher education as a route to ensure a higher ranking job.

According to a study done by the London School of Economics in 2010, the British Chinese tend to be better educated and earn more than the general British population as a whole. British Chinese are also more likely to go to more prestigious universities or to get higher class degrees than any other ethnic minority in the United Kingdom. Nearly 45% of British Chinese men and more than a third of British Chinese women achieved a first or higher degree. Between 1995 and 1997, 29% of British Chinese have higher educational qualifications. This was the highest rate for any ethnic group during those two years. Between 2006 and 2008, the figure had risen to 45%, where it again remained the highest for any ethnic group. In terms of educational achievement at the secondary level, Chinese males and females perform well above the national median. A tenth of Chinese boys are ranked in the top 3% overall, and a tenth of Chinese girls in the top 1%. Due to the rigorous primary and secondary school system in East Asian countries such as China, Hong Kong, and Taiwan, Britons of Chinese, Hong Kong, and Taiwanese descent rank within the top 5 in British as well as international scholastic mathematical and scientific aptitude tests and tend to score better in these subjects than the general population average. British Chinese remain rare among most Special Educational Needs types at the primary and secondary school level, except for Speech, Language and Communication needs, where first-generation Chinese pupils are greatly over-represented with the influx of first-generation immigrants coming from Mainland China, Taiwan, and Hong Kong.

According to Department for Education statistics for the 2021–22 academic year, British Chinese pupils in England attained the highest level of academic performance at both A-Level and GCSE. 36.8% of British Chinese pupils achieved at least 3 As at A Level and an average score of 66.1 was achieved in Attainment 8 scoring at GCSE level. Trevor Phillips, former Chairman of the Equality and Human Rights Commission, has argued that Chinese and Indian-heritage pupils achieve high standards of academic attainment regardless of the school attended or poverty levels. British Chinese pupils in receipt of free school meals, a proxy for socioeconomic status, on average outperform all other ethnicities including those in higher socioeconomic status (not in receipt of free school meals).

Percentage of students getting at least 3 A grades at A level (2021/22)
Ethnic Group	%
Chinese	36.8
Indian	28.4
All ethnic groups (average)	23.1
Mixed	21.1
White	20.7
Bangladeshi	16.5
Pakistani	15.8
Black	12.3
Gypsy/Roma	2.2

Average GCSE Attainment 8 score (out of 90.0) (2021/22)
Ethnic group	Score
Chinese	66.1
Indian	61.3
Bangladeshi	54.4
Mixed	49.4
Pakistani	49.1
All ethnic groups (average)	48.8
Black	48.6
White	47.8
Gypsy/Roma	21.0

Percentage of pupils getting a grade 5 or above in English and maths GCSE (2021/22)
Ethnic group	%
Chinese	80.0
Indian	73.0
Bangladeshi	62.1
Pakistani	51.2
Mixed	49.9
All ethnic groups (average)	49.8
Black	49.4
White	47.9
Gypsy/Roma	8.5

=== Employment ===
First generation British citizens of Chinese backgrounds remain over-represented in self-employment, however, rates of self-employment fell between 1991 and 2001 as second generation British Chinese chose not to follow their parents into business and instead choose to find employment in the paid labor market. First and second-generation British Chinese men have one of the lowest unemployment rates in the nation, with an unemployment rate of 4.08% and 4.32% compared with slightly higher figures of 5% for White Irish (first and second generation). Vertical segregation is also apparent for men and women in the British Chinese community. British Chinese men are twice as likely to be working than White British men to be in professional jobs (27%, and 14% respectively). Chinese men have the third highest rate of employment in managerial jobs at 31%. This compares to 45% for Indian men, 35% for white men and 23% for Black Caribbeans.

A colossal rate of diversity in British self-employment and entrepreneurship in the British Chinese Community has been considerably high. East Asian British groups (Chinese, Japanese, South Korean) and British South Asian groups (Indian, Bangladeshi, and Pakistani) typically have higher rates of self-employment than Whites, while Black groups (Black African and Black Caribbean) have lower rates. Self-employment rates in the British Chinese community is generally higher than the national average. For instance, White British had self-employment rates of 17% in 2001, but the British Chinese self-employment rate was 28%, the higher than the British Indian rate of 21%, British Pakistanis of 27%, and the highest overall among Britain's main ethnic groups. However, overall aggregate self-employment fell between the decade of 1991 to 2001 as the proportion of British Chinese with higher qualifications grew from 27% to 43% between the years of 1991 to 2006. 75% of male British Chinese entrepreneurs worked in the distribution, hotel, and catering industries. In 1991, 34.1% of British Chinese men and 20.3% of British Chinese women were self-employed and the rate was the highest among all Britain's major ethnic groups during that year. In Scotland for 2001, self-employment rates for British Chinese men dropped to 27.8% and 18.3% for British Chinese women, yet overall rates still remained the highest among all of Britain's major ethnic groups. The overall self-employment rate in 2001 was 23%. Common business industries for the British Chinese include restaurants, business services, medical and vet services, recreational and cultural services, wholesale distribution, catering, hotel management, retail, and construction. By 2004, overall British Chinese self-employment was just under 16%, as one in five (21%) of British Pakistanis were self-employed and more British Chinese choose to acquire higher qualifications via education. By 2006, 29% of all Chinese men were classed as self-employed compared to 17% of white British men and 18% of Chinese women compared to 7% of White British women.

=== Economics ===
British Chinese men and women also rank very highly in terms of receiving wages well above the national median. According to a 2009 report by the National Equality Panel, British Chinese men had the highest median wage for any ethnic group with £12.70 earned per hour, followed by the medians for White British men at £11.40, and Multiracial Britons at £11.30 and British Indian men at £11.20. British Chinese women also had a high median wage, third only to Black Caribbean women and Multiracial Briton women with a median wage of £10.21 earned per hour. However, British Chinese women were also more likely to experience more pay penalties than other ethnic groups in the United Kingdom despite possessing higher qualifications. When comparing to White British males, Pakistani and Bangladeshi women have the highest gender pay gap while British Chinese women have reversed the gender pay gap. In 2019, the British Chinese had a median hourly pay of £15.38, second only to the White Irish group. In 2022, the median hourly pay for the British Chinese rose to £17.73, 23% higher than the White British. Despite this, research from the Resolution Foundation published in 2020 has found that the ethnic group has the second lowest median total household net wealth at £73,500 – behind Other Whites (£122,800), British Bangladeshis (£124,700), British Caribbeans (£125,400), British Pakistanis (£232,200), White British (£324,100), and British Indians (£347,400). The group were found to have made little progress in increasing net wealth over the decade compared to other ethnicities, and were one of the only ethnic groups in which the average person inherits nothing.

Comparing total income among women from different ethnic groups, a 2010 report by the Government Equalities Office found that British Chinese, Black Caribbean and Black African women had the highest average individual incomes. British Chinese, British Indian and White British women had the highest average equivalent household incomes. Though British Chinese women had both high individual and equivalent household incomes, they also had very dispersed incomes. In the 2016 to 2019 period, the British Chinese community had the second highest percentage of households in the highest income quintile after housing costs (24%). On the other end of the scale, 34% of the community lived in households classified as low income (after housing costs) compared to 22% of all households. In the 2011 to 2014 period, 49% of British Chinese lived in low income households compared to 21% of all households.

A study by the Joseph Rowntree Foundation in 2011 found that British Chinese have one of the lowest poverty rates among different ethnic groups in Britain. The British Chinese adult poverty rate was 20% and the child poverty rate stood at 30%. Of the different ethnic groups studied, Bangladeshis, Pakistanis, and Black Africans had the highest rates of child and adult poverty overall. In contrast, British Chinese, Black Caribbeans, British Indians and White British had the lowest rates.

=== Health and welfare ===
In 2001, Chinese men and women were the least likely to report their health as "not good" of all ethnic groups. Chinese men and women had the lowest rates of long-term illness or disability which restricts daily activities. The British Chinese population (5.8%) were least likely to be providing informal care (unpaid care to relatives, friends or neighbours). Around 0.25% of the British Chinese population were residents in hospital and other care establishments. Fewer than 10% of the Chinese adult population drank above the recommended daily alcohol guidelines on their heaviest drinking day.

In 2021, the Chinese ethnic group were the least likely (5.2%) to smoke of all ethnic groups, falling to 1.7% for Chinese women. 37.5% of British Chinese were overweight or obese compared to 63.5% of the general population in the same year.

The Chinese National Healthy Living Centre was founded in 1987 to promote healthy living, and provide access to health services, for the Chinese community in the UK. The community is widely dispersed across the country and currently makes the lowest use of health services of all minority ethnic groups. The Centre aims to reduce the health inequality between the Chinese community and the general population. Language difficulties and long working hours in the catering trade present major obstacles to many Chinese people in accessing mainstream health provision. Language and cultural barriers can result in their being given inappropriate health solutions. Isolation is a common problem amongst this widely dispersed community and can lead to a range of mental illnesses. The centre, based close to London's Chinatown, provides a range of services designed to tackle both the physical and psychological aspects of health.

=== Politics ===
A survey conducted in 2006, estimated that around 30% of British Chinese were not on the electoral register, and therefore not able to vote. This compares to 6% of whites and 17% for all ethnic minorities.

In a bid to increase voter registration and turnout, and reverse voter apathy within the community, campaigns have been organized such as the British Chinese Register to Vote organised by Get Active UK, a working title that encompasses all the activities run by the Integration of British Chinese into Politics (the British Chinese Project) and its various partners. The campaign wishes to highlight the low awareness of politics among the British Chinese community; to encourage those eligible to vote but not on the electoral register to get registered; and to help people make a difference on issues affecting themselves and their communities on a daily basis by getting their voices heard through voting.

Research conducted by UK in a Changing Europe in 2023 has suggested that British Chinese and British Indian voters held more economically right-wing views, but held the most socially liberal attitudes, in particular towards the LGBT community, compared to other ethnic minorities in the UK. Survey data indicated Conservatives (40 per cent) led Labour (37 per cent) by 3 points amongst the British Chinese.

== Arts ==
The esea contemporary (formerly Centre for Chinese Contemporary Art or CFCCA) is the international agency for the development and promotion of contemporary Chinese artists. Established in 1986, it is based in Manchester, the city with the second largest Chinese community in the UK, and the organisation is part of the region's rich Chinese heritage. The Centre for Chinese Contemporary Art also hosts the International Chinese Live Art Festival which showcases work by Chinese artists from across the world.

The Yellow Earth Theatre company is a London-based international touring company formed by five British East Asian performers in 1995. It aims to promote the writing and performing talents of East Asians in Britain.

The China Arts Space is an organisation that promotes East Asian visual and performing arts. British lecturers Dr Felicia Chan and Dr Andy Willis, of the University of Manchester and University of Salford respectively, have proposed that artists of Chinese heritage in the UK were accepted inclusively under the label British Asian in the 1980s.

=== Music ===
- KT Tunstall
- Herman Li
- Bip Ling
- William Gao
- Emmy the Great
- Eugenia Cheng
- Lucinda Chua
- Tania Chen
- Jamie Woon
- Raymond Yiu
- Vanessa-Mae
- Jasmine Thompson
- Saffron (singer)
- Stevie Hoang
- Andrew Hung
- Reuben Wu

=== Film and television ===
British Chinese film and television productions include:

- The Chinese Detective, (1981–1982) television series
- Ping Pong (1986) directed by Po-Chih Leong
- Soursweet (1988) directed by Mike Newell
- Peggy Su! (1997) directed by Frances-Anne Solomon
- Dim Sum (A Little Bit of Heart) (2002) directed by Jane Wong
- The Missing Chink (2004) directed by Kate Solomon
- Sweet & Sour Comedy (2004) directed by Neil A. McLennan
- Spirit Warriors (2010) television series created by Jo Ho starring Jessica Henwick, Benedict Wong, Tom Wu and Burt Kwouk

=== Documentary ===
- Silk Screens (2008)
- Chinatown (2006), directed by Charlotte Metcalf and Dollan Cannel

=== Radio ===
- Chinese in Britain (BBC Radio 4; April/May 2007, May 2008), presented by Anna Chen
- Beyond the Takeaway (BBC Radio 4; March 2003), directed by David K.S. Tse
- Liver Birds and Laundrymen. Europe's Earliest Chinatown (BBC Radio 3; March 2005), presented by Gregory B. Lee
- Eastern Horizon, (BBC Manchester; December 1983)

=== Books and publishing ===
Huang Yongjun, the founder and General Manager of New Classic Press (UK) has acted as a major advocator of the "China Dream" in the United Kingdom. The New Classic Press that he founded is an effort to "explain China to the world".

== See also ==
- British East and Southeast Asian
- London Fo Guang Shan Temple
- British Hong Kong
- Hong Kong
- Britons in China
- Shaolin Temple UK
- British-Chinese relations
