= Diana Yeh =

British Chinese sociologist and social activist

- 葉樹芳
- Pronunciation: Ye Shufang
- Born: 1975 (age 50–51)
- Education: University of East London
- Occupations: Sociologist, writer, social and political activist
- Employer(s): City, University of London
- Known for: British East and South East Asian Activism

Dr Diana Yeh (simplified Chinese: 叶树芳; traditional Chinese: 葉樹芳; pinyin: Ye Shufang; born 1975) is a British Chinese sociologist, writer, curator, arts worker, and a prominent social and political activist in the United Kingdom. She is regarded as a leading expert on the history of British Chinese artists, and on racism and anti-racism, particularly in relation to Chinese diasporas. Yeh is a regular commentator on these issues, appearing frequently in interviews for international's news outlets.

She currently holds the post of Senior Lecturer in Sociology, Culture and the Creative Industries at City, University of London where she is also Associate Dean of equality and diversity for the School of Arts and Social Sciences.

== Social activism ==
Yeh has been a notable activist in campaigning for racial equality in the United Kingdom, often speaking on radio and television as an expert in the field of race and racism. She has been featured on BBC Radio Four Channel 5, and Resonance FM.

In February 2020, in the face of increasing overt racism against East and Southeast Asian people fuelled by international Sinophobia and racist rhetoric from political leaders such as Donald Trump, Yeh co-organised a nationwide UK campaign #IWillEatWithYou to help fight racist attitudes which were effecting Chinese businesses, particularly restaurants and takeaways. The campaign called on the public to show support and solidarity with East and Southeast Asian business owners by ordering food from their outlets. She is one of the key activists behind the #endthevirusofracism campaign that began in May 2020, and which formed into a London-based non-profit organisation focused on addressing racism against East and Southeast Asian people in the United Kingdom. The group formed after Britain's East and Southeast Asian communities saw a 300-percent increase in racist abuse and hate crime following the outbreak of COVID-19.

In September 2020, Yeh was also one of many key activists behind the #BAMEover campaign by IncArts, which called on the end of the use of BAME (Black, Asian, or other Minority Ethnic), as official terminology to describe people who were non-white.

== Academic contributions ==
As a sociologist, Yeh's contribution to contemporary discourse focuses on issues within race and racisms studies, covering issues and debates around migration and diaspora, particularly in relation the identities of British Chinese and East Asian people. Her work is often related to youth and young people, and the cultural politics of second and third generation migrants. Yeh is principal investigator of the British Academy and Leverhulme Trust funded project titled "Becoming East and Southeast Asian: Race, Ethnicity and Youth Politics of Belonging” . The project archives and examines the experiences of young people being racialised as East Asian in the United Kingdom, exploring their social spaces and their sense of belonging in a so-called “superdiverse” Britain.

Yeh is known for her examination of "British Chinese-ness" and for presenting it as a complex multiplicity involving multiple subjectivities, identities and politics. Yeh argues that there is not yet a syncretic sense of British Chinese culture, and that British Chinese culture is not a fusion of British and Chinese identities but is instead often a conflict between the two national identities. She has argued that the term "British Chinese" is often utilised as a means to negotiate social spaces from which one may be rejected as not "British" or "Chinese" enough. As such it offers agency as an identity that can be considered alongside the more visible identities of Black Britons or British Asian ethnic groups.

Her 2014 monograph The Happy Hsiungs: Performing China and the Struggle for Modernity, published by Hong Kong University Press, focuses on the lives of Hsiung Shi-h and Dymia. It describes the "lost histories" of "two once highly visible, but now largely forgotten Chinese writers in Britain, who sought to represent China and Chineseness to the rest of the world."

In an article from 2021, Yeh describes the emergence of East and Southeast Asian (ESEA) identities in Britain as part of a wider political, anti-racist movement.

Regarded as a leading expert on British Chinese Arts she has been credited for conducting original fieldwork on identity politics of British Chinese and Chinese migrant contemporary artists across art forms. Since 2019, along with film-maker Rosa Fong, she has been involved with BEAST: British East Asians on Screen and in Television, which confronts racial inequalities in the film and cultural industries. This work resulted in a series of new short films produced by ITV and the British Film Institute, inspired by research interviews that Yeh had previously conducted on racial inequality in the film and television industries. Her work has also featured in cultural venues such as the National Portrait Gallery and Tate Britain.

Yeh was previously lecturer at Birkbeck, University of London, the University of East London, and the University of Winchester. She also acted as a specialist consultant at London's Royal Geographical Society.

== Selected Writings ==
=== Books ===
- Thorpe, Ashley, and Diana Yeh, editors. Contesting British Chinese Culture. Palgrave Macmillan, 2018.
- Yeh, Diana. The Happy Hsiungs: Performing China and the Struggle for Modernity. Hong Kong University Press, 2014.

=== Articles ===
- Yeh, Diana (2021). "Becoming British East Asian and Southeast Asian: Anti-racism, Chineseness and the crafting of new political communities." British Journal of Chinese Studies.
- Mbaye, J. and Yeh, Diana (2020). #BLM and the city. City, Culture and Society, 23, pp. 100373–100373.
- Yeh, Diana (2020). COVID-19, Anti-Asian Racial Violence, and The Borders of Chineseness. British Journal of Chinese Studies, 10.
- Yeh, Diana (2014). "Contesting the 'model minority': racialization, youth culture and 'British Chinese'/'Oriental’ nights". Ethnic and Racial Studies, 37(7), pp. 1197–1210.
- Yeh, Diana (2010). Pot Luck: Food and Art. The Senses and Society, 5(3), pp. 412–418. doi:10.2752/174589210x12753842356403
- Yeh, Diana (2000). "Ethnicities on the move: 'British-Chinese' art - identity, subjectivity, politics and beyond." Critical Quarterly, 42(2), pp. 65–91. doi:10.1111/1467-8705.00287

=== PhD Dissertation ===
- Yeh, Diana. Re-Imagining '(British)-Chineseness' : The Politics and Poetics of Art and Migration in Diaspora Space. University of East London, 2009. ethos.bl.uk, https://ethos.bl.uk/OrderDetails.do?did=1&uin=uk.bl.ethos.532993.
