= Singaporeans in the United Kingdom =

Ethnic group

Total population
- Singapore-born residents in the United Kingdom: 45,009 (2021/22 Census) (Note: Does not include ethnic Singaporeans born in the United Kingdom or those with ancestry rooted in Singapore); England: 39,637 (2021); Scotland: 3,725 (2022); Wales: 1,287 (2021); Northern Ireland: 360 (2021); Previous estimates: 40,474 (2001 Census); 41,000 (2009 ONS estimate)

Regions with significant populations
- Central London; Cambridge; Portsmouth; Oxford; Bath; Plymouth; Exeter

Languages
- English; Malay; Mandarin; Tamil

Religion
- Buddhism; Christianity; Islam; Taoism; Hinduism

Related ethnic groups
- Overseas Singaporean

Singaporeans in the United Kingdom may refer to people who have full or partial Singaporean origin or descent, born or settled in the United Kingdom, or Singaporeans in Britain which are high-income expatriate professionals as well as skilled workers, with many still maintaining close ties with Singapore, especially those who continue to retain Singaporean citizenship while having permanent residency in Britain, as well as students.

As Singapore is a multi-racial country, a Singaporean British could either be of Chinese, Malay, Indian, or Eurasian descent, the main races of Singapore. The 2021 census for England and Wales recorded the majority (53.4%) of usual residents who were born in Singapore identified as White British. 19.0% identified as Chinese and 8.0% identified as Indian.

== Background ==
The story of the Singaporean community in the UK has some similarities follows that of the British Chinese community, as Singaporeans of Chinese descent (see Chinese Singaporean) make up around 70% of the population. The Singaporean diaspora in Britain stems from Singapore's history as a former British colony (as part of the Straits Settlements' capital from 1826 to 1942, and separately as the Crown Colony of Singapore from 1946 to 1959), and its current membership in the Commonwealth of Nations.

=== Population ===
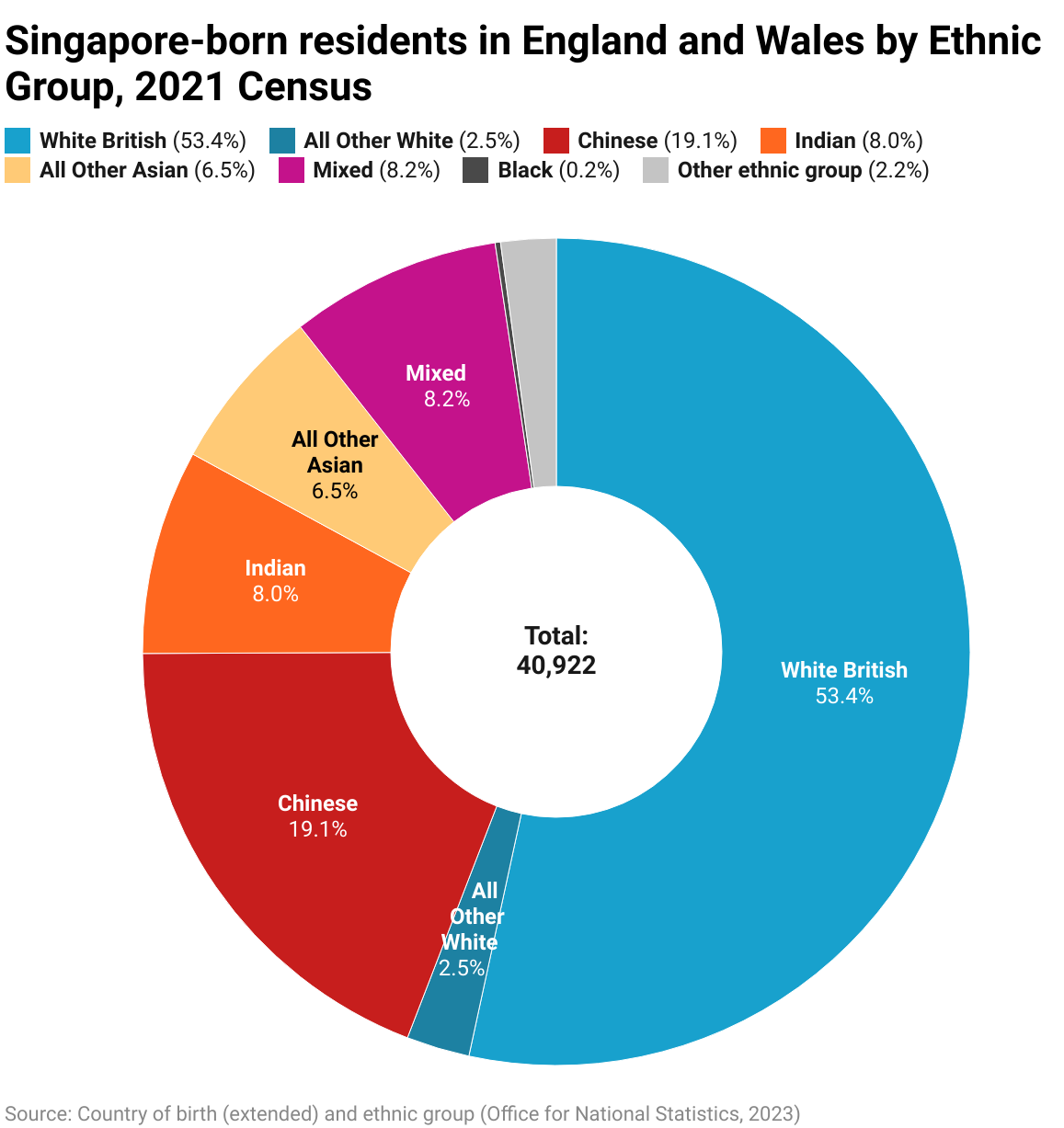
Singapore-born residents by ethnic group (2021 census, England and Wales)

40,474 Singaporean-born people were recorded by the 2001 UK Census, with 40,180 of those living in Great Britain. The Singaporean-born population of Great Britain has increased by 19 per cent since the 1991 Census, when 33,751 Singaporean-born people were recorded.

The Office for National Statistics estimates that, in 2009, 41,000 Singaporean-born people were resident in the UK. The 2021 United Kingdom census recorded a population of just over 45,000 Singaporean-born residents in the United Kingdom.

The distribution of Singaporean-born residents according to the 2001 census is shown on the map. Nine of the ten census tracts with the most Singaporean-born residents in 2001 are in London. The most popular tracts were Hyde Park, Kensington, Holborn, Chelsea, Southall West, Regent's Park, Cambridge West, Highgate, East Ham South, Richmond North.

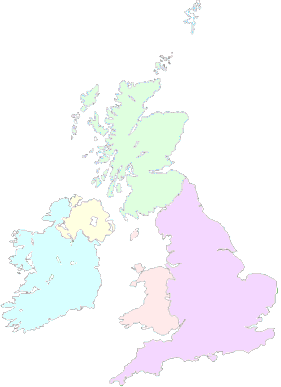

== Notable individuals ==
The list below includes British people of Singaporean descent and Singaporean immigrants to the UK, regardless of ethnicity. This is a non-exhaustive list.

- Fiona Bruce, journalist
- Nigel Callaghan, footballer
- Michael Chan, Baron Chan, physician and politician
- Leslie Charteris, thriller writer and screenwriter
- Matt Carmichael, footballer
- Jon Foo, actor and martial artist
- Richard Fortin, cricketer
- Demis Hassabis, researcher
- Jessica Henwick, actress
- Wendy Kweh, actress
- Nancy Lam, celebrity chef
- Soo Bee Lee, soprano singer
- Vanessa-Mae, pop and classical musician
- Melville McKee, racing driver
- Perry Ng, footballer
- Luke O'Nien, footballer
- Sam Quek, former field hockey player and Olympic gold medalist
- Clive Rees, rugby union player
- Louis Theroux, broadcaster
- Paul Thompson, head coach of the Coventry Blaze and the Great Britain national men's ice hockey team
- Colin Thurston, recording engineer and producer
- Zing Tsjeng, journalist and author
- Anjana Vasan, actress
- Jason Wong, actor
- Nancy Yuen, singer
- Jen Theng Craven or Jin-Theng Craven (née Goh), daughter of former Prime Minister of Singapore Goh Chok Tong
- Jerrold Yam, poet and lawyer

== See also ==
- Singaporeans
- Singapore–United Kingdom relations
- British East and Southeast Asian
- British Singapore — former colony & part of British Malaya and Straits Settlements.
- East Asians in the United Kingdom
- Chinese Singaporeans
- Indian Singaporeans
- Malay Singaporeans
