= John Anthony (interpreter) =

- Born: c. 1766
- Died: August 1805; Hallowall Down
- Resting place: St Paul's Church, Shadwell
- Employer: East India Company
- Spouse: Esther Gole

John Anthony (c. 1766 – August 1805) was an interpreter and tradesman who became the first Chinese person to gain British citizenship in 1805, which was achieved through an Act of Parliament.

== Biography ==
Anthony left China aged 11 and travelled between London and China for several years before permanently relocating in 1799. As an employee of the East India Company, he was stationed at Angels Gardens in East London to provide translation and accommodation for Chinese and Lascar sailors. China Rhyming described him as "perhaps the father" of London's first Chinatown in Limehouse, where the sailors were housed. As of 1804, he worked as an interpreter in the Old Bailey court, interpreting for a Chinese prosecutor named Erpoon during a theft trial.

Anthony Anglicised his name and converted to the Church of England from paganism; his baptism took place at Shadwell Church. He married Esther Gole, sister of Abraham Gole in 1799.

With his fortune, Anthony had a country house in Hallowall Down, Essex (possibly Holloway Down) and a townhouse in Shadwell. He applied for British citizenship; the Act of Parliament allowing him to passed in March 1805. He died a few months later in August 1805 at age 39. His funeral at St Paul's Church, Shadwell drew over two thousand mourners. An obituary in The Gentlemen's Magazine described Anthony as having "bore a most excellent character".

== Legacy ==
In 2018, a dim sum restaurant named after Anthony opened in Hong Kong. Anthony's story featured in a 2023 exhibit at the London Metropolitan Archives (LMA) titled The Unforgotten Lives.
