= Mongolians in the United Kingdom =

Total population
- Mongolian-born residents 293 (2001 UK Census); 1,689 (2011 UK Census); Other population estimates 5,000–7,000 (2009 community leaders' estimates)

Regions with significant populations
- Greater London, Manchester

Languages
- Mongolian, British English

Religion
- Tibetan Buddhism

Mongolians in the United Kingdom (also known as Mongols) are a relatively small but fast emerging ethnic group, including both Mongolian expatriates and migrants residing in the UK along with British-born citizens who identify themselves to be of Mongolian national background or descent.

== History and settlement ==
Migration from Mongolia to the United Kingdom is a fairly recent phenomenon that is directly connected to the political and social changes that have taken place in Mongolia in the late 20th/ early 21st century. During the mid-1900s the only significant Mongolian diaspora existed in the former Soviet Union due to strong ties with each respective nation. Formal diplomatic relation between the UK and Mongolia were established in 1963. However, after 1991 when the Soviet Union collapsed and began to form a democratic nation, migration trends from Mongolia began to change and the movement of Mongolians to other parts of the world (including the UK) became much more evident. Following these major changes to the political composition of Mongolia, many citizens of the nation found that they struggled in the new economy, many subsequently left the country in search of new lives in the United States and Western Europe. Migration to the UK specifically began in the 1990s and has continued ever since, the majority of Mongolians who moved to the UK in the 1990s were economic migrants who intended to earn money to support themselves and their family back home, in contrast to most migrants who moved to the UK prior to the year 2000 who were largely students seeking better standards of higher education. Evidence of a more established community has come to light in the increasing number of Mongolian-run bars, cafés, shops and organisations in the UK.

== Demographics and population ==
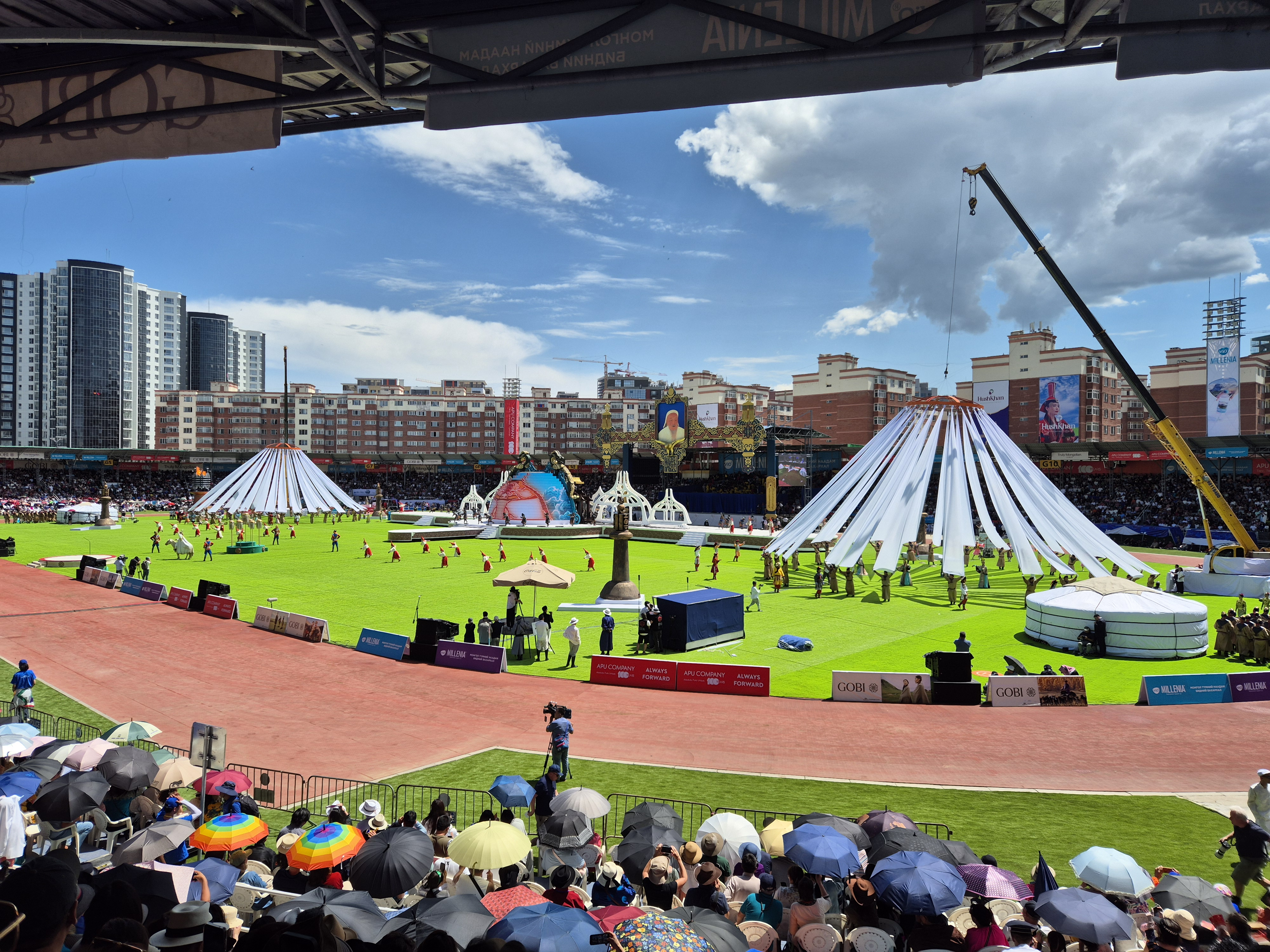
One of Mongolia's most important yearly events, the Naadam is also celebrated by British Mongolians in London, albeit on a much smaller scale

The 2001 Census recorded 293 Mongolian-born people residing in the UK. According to the 2011 UK Census, there were 1,620 Mongolian-born residents in England, 35 in Wales, and 34 in Scotland.

Other estimates suggest that the Mongolian community is larger. According to an International Organization for Migration mapping exercise, in 2009 community leaders put the size of the Mongolian community at 5,000 to 7,000. The Mongolian embassy in the UK put the figure at between 6,000 and 7,000 in 2009.

Within the UK, the majority of Mongolians reside in Greater London, accounting for 971 of the 1,689 Mongolian-born UK residents recorded in the 2011 Census. 2009 community estimates reported by the International Organization for Migration placed the number of Mongolians in the British capital at 5,000 to 7,000, followed by the Mongolian community of Manchester with 400 to 500 members. Newcastle upon Tyne was estimated to be home to 100 Mongolians, whilst between 60 and 70 were reported as residing in Leicester and 50 to 60 in Bradford. The International Organization for Migration mapping exercise also found evidence of a number of Mongolians also residing in Brighton, Liverpool, Milton Keynes, Nottingham and the university towns of Cambridge, Oxford, Dundee and Cardiff.

== Culture and community ==
The International Organization for Migration's 2009 mapping exercise of Mongolians in the UK reported that there were no Mongolian-language newspapers, magazines or radio stations based in the UK, and that most Mongolians who wish to access news from their homeland do so via the internet, including by watching Mongolian television online. To reflect the rapid increase of the size of the UK's Mongolian community, numerous community groups have been set up in hope of bringing Mongolians in the UK together as well as acting as a helpful aid in adjusting to the British lifestyle. An annual Mongolian "Naadam" takes place every July in Islington's Highbury Fields, the same time as a much larger similar festival takes place in the Mongolian capital, Ulaanbaatar. Also known as the Mongolia Charity Rally, the event is attended by Mongolians from across the country who come together and enjoy wrestling, archery, food and traditional music. In 2019 a Mongolian supported charity drive and race was held to deliver gifts to children who are victims of domestic or neglect in the outskirts of Ulaanbaatar. £850 was raised at the event. Expat network InterNations also hosts regular events in various cities around the UK where Mongolian expats can meet face-to-face and socialize.

== See also ==
- Mongolia–United Kingdom relations
- Mongols
- Mongolia charity rally
