= East Asians in the United Kingdom =

East Asians living in the United Kingdom

Total population
- England and Wales only: 515,032 – 0.9% (2021): Chinese – 445,619 – 0.8% (2021); Japanese – 29,510 – 0.05% (2021); Korean – 21,118 – 0.04% (2021); Taiwanese – 4,222 – 0.01% (2021); Other East Asian/East Asian unspecified: 14,563 – 0.02% (2021); Does not include any East Asians who may be in the 'Other Ethnic Group' as provided by the Office for National Statistics for the 2021 census.

Regions with significant populations
- London, Belfast, Liverpool, Manchester, Oxford, Cambridge, Glasgow, Edinburgh, York

Languages
- Cantonese – 55,555; Mandarin Chinese – 30,820; All other Chinese – 118,271; Japanese – 22,548; Korean – 12,117; All other East Asian languages – 12,001; Number of speakers in England & Wales as a main language, of all usual residents aged 3 and over, from the 2021 census.

Religion
- Buddhism, Christianity, East Asian religions, Non-religious, others

Related ethnic groups
- Asians

East Asians in the United Kingdom are East Asians living in the United Kingdom. They have been present in the country since the 17th century and primarily originate from countries such as China, Hong Kong (SAR of China), Japan, South Korea and Taiwan. They are called "East Asian" or "Oriental", although – dependent upon the context – the use of the term "Oriental" might be considered by some to be derogatory or offensive. In the 2001 British census, the term Chinese or Other is used.

In the 2001 Census, East Asians were included in the "Asian or Asian British" grouping in England and Wales, and in the "Asian, Asian Scottish or Asian British" grouping in Scotland. The 2011 Census questionnaire grouped East Asians under a broad "Asian/Asian British" ("Asian, Asian Scottish or Asian British" in Scotland) heading in all parts of the UK.

== Population history ==
East Asian Britons are generally viewed as a distinct ethnic group or identity, and have been academically studied as such. The first settlement of Chinese people in the United Kingdom dates from the early 19th century. In particular were port cities such as Liverpool and London; particularly the Limehouse area in East London. Today, most of the British Chinese are people or are descended from people who were themselves overseas Chinese when they entered the United Kingdom. The majority are from former British colonies, such as Hong Kong, Malaysia, Burma, Singapore, Canada, Australia and New Zealand, and also other countries such as Vietnam. People from mainland China and Taiwan and their descendants constitute a relatively small proportion of the British Chinese community. Hong Kong people in the United Kingdom are people from Hong Kong resident in the United Kingdom, or British nationals of Hong Kong origin. At the time of the 2001 British census, 96,000 people born in Hong Kong were residing in the UK, while 2009 estimates suggest that 78,000 Hong Kong-born people are resident in the UK.

The first Japanese settled in the 1960s, mainly for business and economic purposes. In recent decades this number has been growing; including immigrants, students, and businessmen. Parts of the United Kingdom, in particular London, have significant Japanese populations; such as Golders Green and East Finchley North London. There are approximately 100,000 British Japanese, mostly settled in London and the surrounding South East.

Large numbers of South Koreans began to settle in the U.K. in the 1980s, mostly near London; the highest concentration can be found in the town of New Malden, where estimates of the South Korean population range from 8,000 to as high as 20,000 people. There are also a few North Koreans; they form the ninth-largest national group of asylum seekers, with a total of 850 applicants, including 245 applications in the first seven months of the year alone, thirteen times the number in all of 2007.

=== Country of birth ===
The figures below represent data collected for the 2021 United Kingdom census with the country as a reported birthplace recorded (i.e. does not include British born people of East Asian origin). The census in Scotland was delayed for a year and took place in 2022.

State/Territory	England (2021)	Scotland (2022)	Wales (2021)	Northern Ireland (2021)	United Kingdom (2021/22)
China	176,072	21,396	6,304	4,134	207,906
Hong Kong	117,714	11,901	3,715	1,981	135,311
Japan	34,394	1,705	625	179	36,905
South Korea	18,859	1,060	340	134	20,403
Taiwan	10,128	854	163	74	11,217
Macau	2,441	271	48	36	2,796
Mongolia	1,819	79	43	0	1,941
North Korea	525	20	8	0	553
Total	361,952	37,282	11,246	6,464	416,944

=== Ethnic group ===
Ethnic group	England (2021)	Scotland (2022)	Wales (2021)	Northern Ireland (2021)	United Kingdom (2021/22) (Note: Excluding Scotland, with the exception of the Chinese ethnic group where 2022 census data is available.)
Chinese	431,165	47,075	14,454	9,495	502,189
Japanese	29,027	To be published, only 2011 figures available	483	96	29,606
Korean	20,776	To be published, only 2011 figures available	342	109	21,227
Taiwanese	4,149	To be published, only 2011 figures available	73	15	4,237
Other East Asian	14,295	To be published, only 2011 figures available	266	–	14,561
Total	499,412	TBC	15,618	9,715	571,820

== Subgroups ==
- East Asians
  - Chinese
  - Mongolians
  - Japanese
  - Koreans
  - Hong Kongers

== Notable people ==
- Alan Mak, Member of parliament for Havant (2015–present). Representing the Conservative Party, he is the first MP elected of East Asian decsent.
- Nat Wei, Baron Wei, Conservative member of the House of Lords (2010–present). Writing for The Telegraph in 2012, described himself as the only East Asian person politically involved in Westminster.
- Sonny Leong, Baron Leong, Labour member of the House of Lords (2022–present).
- Yuan Yang, Labour Member of parliament for Earley and Woodley (2024–present). Formerly the UK-based Europe–China correspondent for the Financial Times, she is the first mainland Chinese-born MP.

== See also ==
- British Asian
- British East and Southeast Asian
- Asian Americans
- Asian Australians
- Asian Canadians
- Asian New Zealanders
- Southeast Asians in the United Kingdom
