= Antenor (disambiguation) =

Antenor was an Athenian sculptor of the 6th century BC.

Antenor may also refer to:

== People ==
- Antenor (king), a king of the Cimmerian Bosporus
- Antenor (Trojan), a figure in Greek mythology
- Antenor (mythology), a list of other people with the name in Greek mythology
- Antenor (writer), ancient Greek writer
- Antenor of Provence (fl. c. 700), patrician of Provence
- Anténor Firmin, (1850–1911), Haitian anthropologist, journalist, and politician
- Antenor Nascentes, (1886–1972), Brazilian philologist, etymologist, and lexicographer
- Antenor Orrego, (1892–1960), Peruvian writer and political philosopher
- Antenor Patiño, (1896–1982), Bolivian tycoon
- Antenor Machado Filho (born 1952), Brazilian footballer

== Other uses ==
- Any one of five Alfred Holt and Company / Blue Funnel ships:
  - SS Antenor (1872)
  - SS Antenor (1896)
  - SS Antenor (1924), steamship 1924–1953, serving as HMS Antenor during WW2
  - MS Antenor (1957)
  - MS Antenor (1972)
- 2207 Antenor, a Jovian (Jupiter) Trojan asteroid
- Antenor Kore, a Late Archaic statue of a girl, attributed to the Athenian sculptor
- Antenor Navarro Formation, an Early Cretaceous geologic formation in Brazil
- Antenor Orrego Private University
