= Home Office 213/926 =

Home Office record of deportations of Chinese seamen in 1945 and 1946

Home Office 213/926 or HO 213/926 is a Home Office file which records the secret deportation from the United Kingdom of thousands of seafarers to China in 1945 and 1946, permanently separating them from their families. It was officially entitled "Compulsory repatriation of undesirable Chinese seamen."

== Background ==
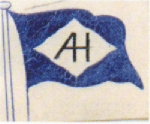
Alfred Holt house flag

Alfred Holt founded the Ocean Steam Ship Company in 1866. It became Blue Funnel Line, one of the UK's larger shipowning and operating companies. In 1902 the company acquired the competing China Mutual Steam Navigation Company, but kept it as a separate part of the Blue Funnel group. Blue Funnel ships linked the major ports of Shanghai, Canton, and Hong Kong with Liverpool. Both Chinese and European seafarers crewed the ships.

Chinese workers made significant contributions to the Allied war effort in World War I. The British and French governments recruited about 140,000 members to the Chinese Labour Corps to work on the Western Front. After the end of the war, the British government mostly concealed their contributions. The end of the war also saw a rise in racist attacks in the UK, such as the 1919 South Wales race riots that targeted multicultural areas in Wales.

At the start of World War II, about 20,000 Chinese merchant seamen were living in Liverpool. As the war put pressure on the British Merchant Navy, Chinese seafarers became an important part of its workforce. A 1944 BBC war propaganda film highlighted, among others, the contribution of the Chinese merchant seamen, stating that "the Chinese in Britain provide one of those living links that are forging the unity of the new family of Nations."

Chinese seafarers often worked longer hours, but they were granted less shore leave and paid far lower wages than their European counterparts, usually about a third of the wage of a European of the same rank. In February 1942, a number of Chinese sailors went on strike to protest the iniquity, led by the Liverpool Chinese Seamen's Union. The strike continued until that April, at which point the sailors were awarded a pay increase of £2 a month and the standard £10 a month "war risk" bonus.

== Deportations ==
As soon as World War II ended, Blue Funnel Line reduced the wages of Chinese seamen to a level that it internally admitted was too low to live on. Chinese seamen were also barred from seeking employment ashore.

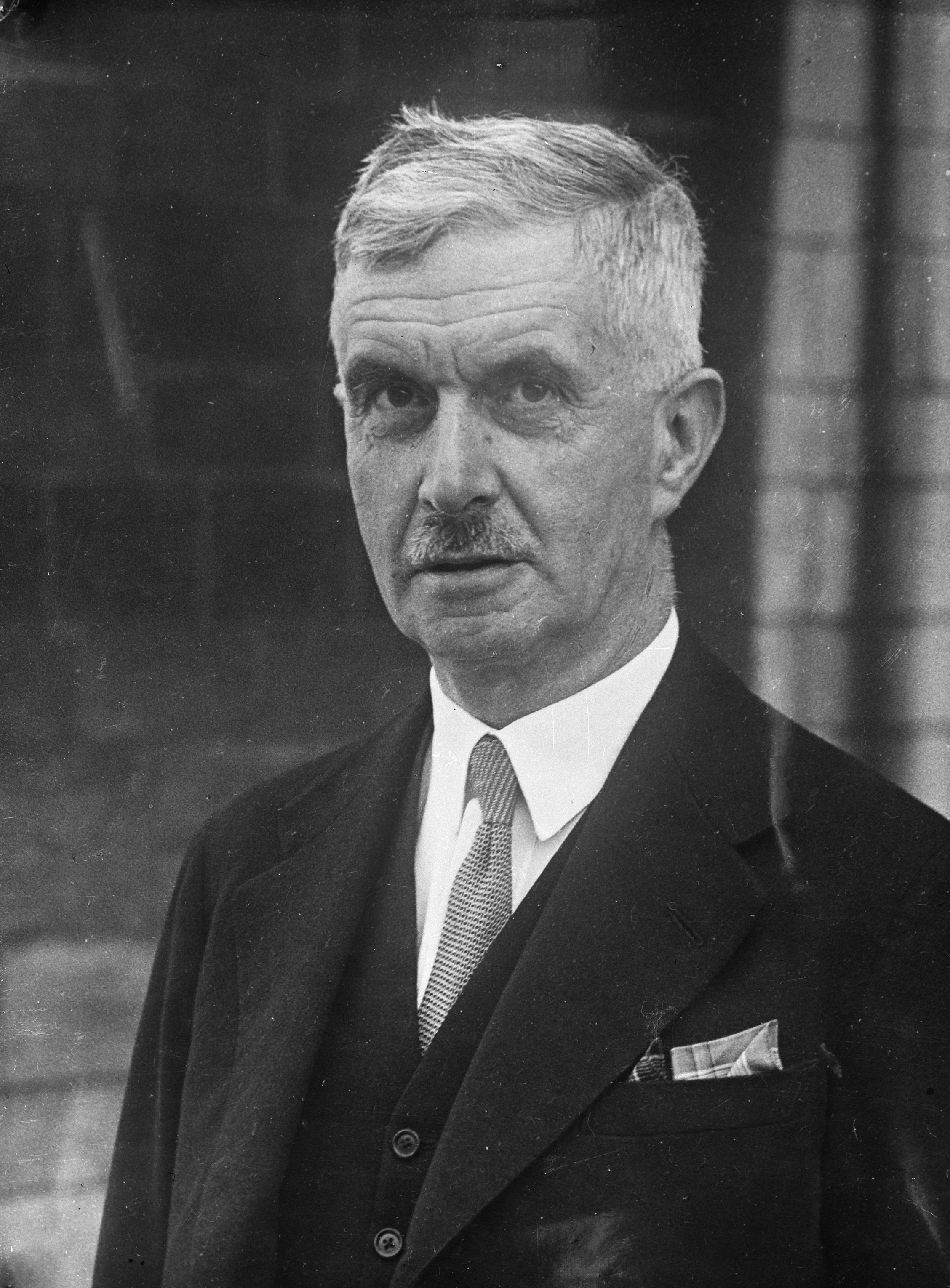
James Chuter Ede was Home Secretary 1945–51, including the period when Britain deported Chinese seafarers

On 19 October 1945, two months after the end of the war, Courtenay Denis Carew Robinson, Assistant Under-Secretary of State for the Home Office, chaired a secret meeting at Whitehall, joined by representatives of the Foreign Office, the Ministry of War Transport, and the Liverpool City Police and immigration inspectorate. In the meeting, the Home Office finalised a policy titled "Compulsory repatriation of undesirable Chinese seamen," under a file designated HO 213/926.

The policy was kept secret in part because it was illegal, as only sailors who had been discharged due to criminal convictions could legally be deported, and only a tiny number of the seamen targeted for deportation had faced any charges during their time in the service. The Home Office had also internally acknowledged that even among the small number that had faced charges, minor gambling and opium offences were commonplace in dockside life and did not warrant deportation.

After the policy was finalised, Home Office officials, along with Liverpool Police, worked with shipping companies in the UK to arrest Chinese seamen and forcibly deported them to China. Some of the workers were forced to sign discharge papers that would have them discharged in China, with no way to return to the UK. To deport the seamen, Blue Funnel modified some of its ships, including the steamships Diomed, Menelaus, Priam, Sarpedon and Theseus, installing makeshift bunks to hold the seamen who had been brought directly by the police.

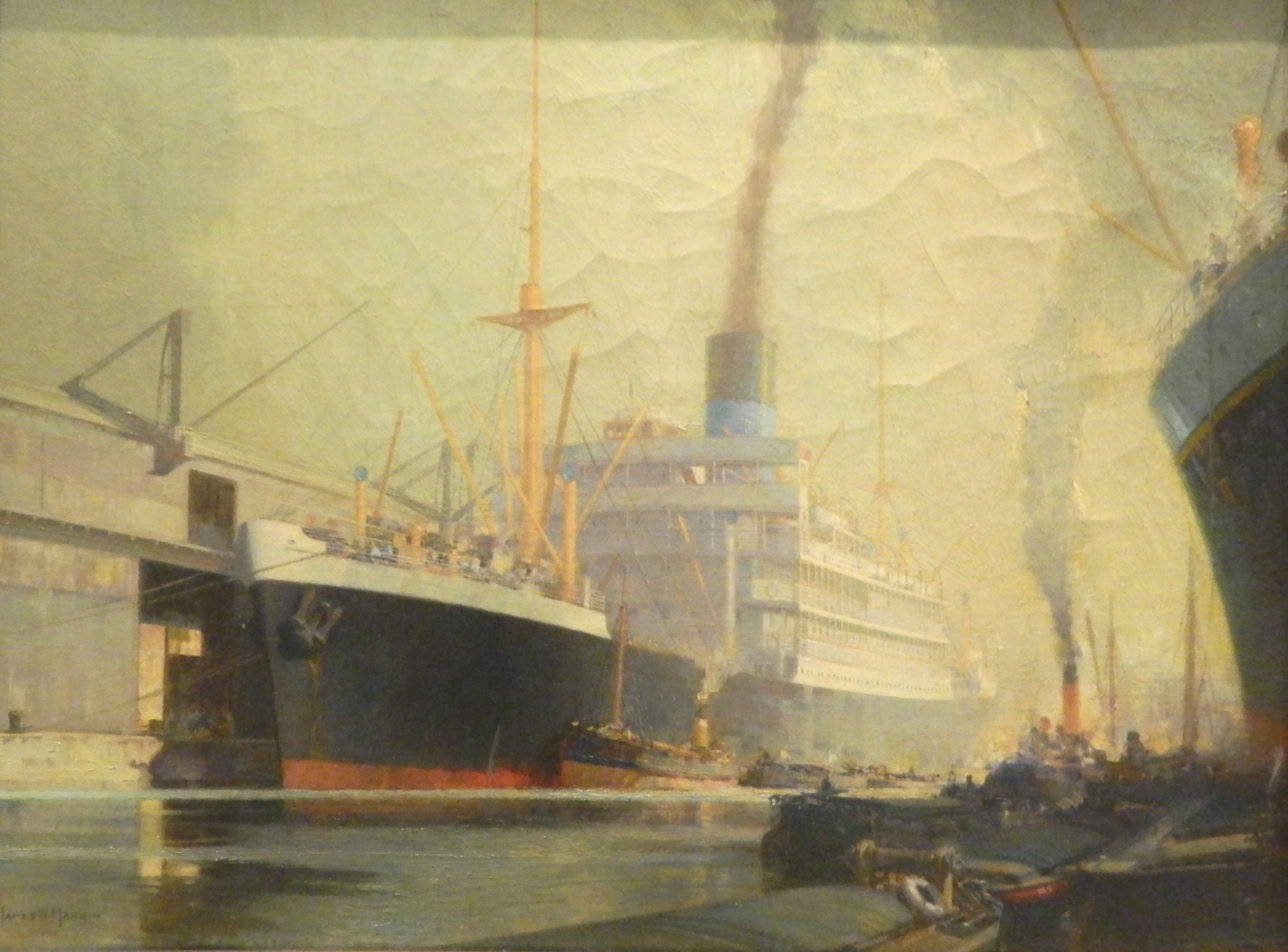
Oil painting in the Museum of Liverpool of Sarpedon, one of the ships used to deport Chinese seamen in 1945–46

By the end of 1945, the police increased their efforts to round up remaining Chinese seamen, searching through homes in night raids and asking police chiefs elsewhere in the country to report any seamen. One immigration office memo stated that "It should not be difficult, if energetic steps are taken, to weed these out of the restaurant kitchens, laundries, etc." Deportations continued until at least December 1946.

In the War, many of the seamen based in Liverpool had settled in the city, falling in love and starting families with local women. Those families were neither notified of the deportations nor given any information as to the fates of the seamen, leaving many to assume that the seamen had simply abandoned them.

By mid-1946, rumours of the deportations had spread through the Liverpool community. The Liverpool Echo published a report under the headline "British Wives of Chinese." A group of the seamen's wives protested against the government that summer, stating that they were left destitute and that "we are left to live on public aid, charity and the help of our families." However, the government refused to acknowledge the protest. Labour MP Bessie Braddock wrote to the Home Office in support of the protesting wives, but was told that the deportations would continue since, if they didn't, "it might embarrass the immigration officer, Liverpool, the police and the shipping companies concerned."

== Legacy ==
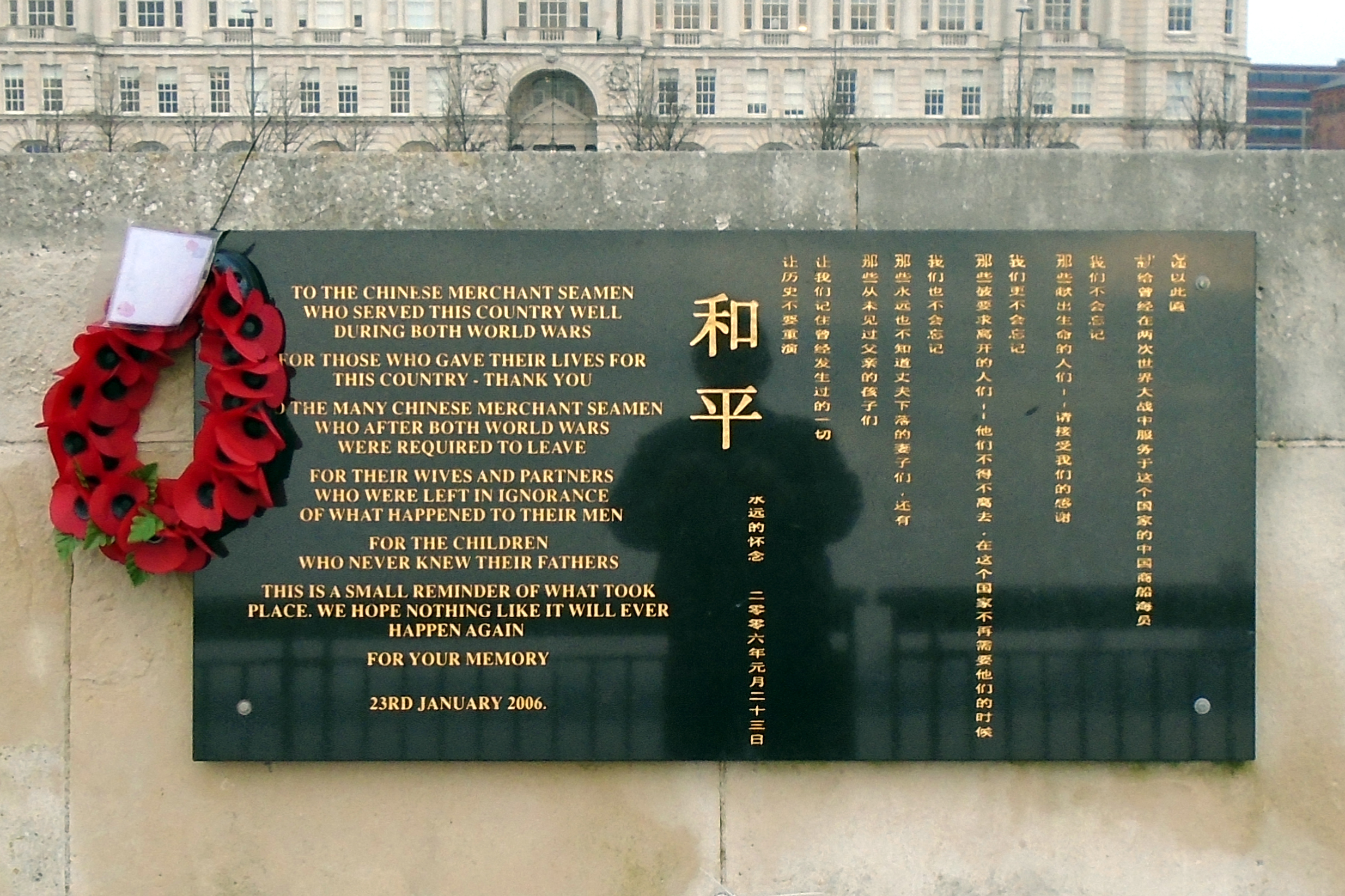
Chinese merchant seamen memorial, Liverpool's Pier Head

In the 2010s, Liverpool MPs Luciana Berger and Stephen Twigg raised the issue of the deportations with the Home Office, but were told by the Conservative government's ministers that no forcible repatriations had taken place. In March 2021 the Labour MP for Liverpool Riverside, Kim Johnson, raised the issue of the deportations during Prime Minister's Questions. This was the first time the matter had been raised in Parliament since 2015. Prime Minister Boris Johnson refused to state whether the government would consider issuing an official apology, instead simply stating that "we are certainly very grateful across the country to the Chinese community for their amazing contribution." However, Parliamentary Under-Secretary of State for Safe and Legal Migration Kevin Foster subsequently announced that the Home Office would perform an internal investigation into the deportations. The report of the investigation was finalised in mid-2022, and found that there had been a "willingness to countenance wide-scale coercion" of the seafarers and that the language used to justify the deportations had been "clearly racially inflected and prejudicial."

== Media ==
In 2002, the BBC released a documentary titled Shanghai'd on the deportations. In 2006, six decades after the deportations, a memorial plaque in remembrance of those Chinese seamen was installed on Liverpool's Pier Head. A network has also been established for families of Chinese seamen who were repatriated after the Second World War. A poem written by Theophilus Kwek entitled "HO 213/926" was shortlisted for the Berfrois Poetry Prize in 2016.

In 2018, a major multimedia exhibition called 'Dragons of the Pool', by Rosa Fong with Yvonne and Charles Foley, was staged at Williamson Museum and Art Gallery in Birkenhead, Wirral. Funded by the National Lottery, over three thousand people attended the exhibition from as far as Australia and Canada, bringing the deportations to wider public view. A commemorative edition of the book, Sea Dragons: Liverpool and its Chinese Seamen by Yvonne and Charles Foley was printed for the exhibition.

The Exiles: My Stolen Chinese Father was produced by Channel NewsAsia (CNA) in 2023.. The documentary uncovers the story of hundreds of Chinese seamen who served with the Allies during the Second World War, only to mysteriously disappear from their homes in Liverpool. The Exiles was nominated for an International Emmy Award in 2024 (Documentary).

In 2024, a drama was broadcast on BBC Radio 4 entitled "Dragons of the Pool," written by Kathryn Golding, with the help of Yvonne Foley, the founder of documentary website Dragons and Lions. The story was inspired by Chinese seamen forcibly repatriated from Liverpool in 1945 and 1946 under HO 213/926, where a fictionalized English woman common-law married a Chinese seaman who later was secretly transported to China. Fifty years on, the daughter tries to find her repatriated father.

== See also ==
- History of Chinese immigration to the United Kingdom
- British Chinese
- British merchant seamen of World War II
- Racism in the United Kingdom
