= SS Antenor (1872) =

History

United Kingdom
- Name: SS Antenor
- Owner: Alfred Holt and Company
- Operator: Ocean Steam Ship Company (1872–1891); Nederlandsche Stoomvaart Maatschappij Oceaan (1891–1893)
- Builder: Hawthorn Leslie and Company, Hebburn-on-Tyne
- Yard number: 142
- Launched: 27 Nov 1871
- Fate: Sold, 1893; Broken up, 1929

General characteristics
- Tonnage: 2,074 GRT
- Length: 322 ft (98 m)
- Beam: 33 ft 7 in (10.24 m)
- Propulsion: 2-cylinder compound tandem steam engines, 700 ihp (522 kW)
- Speed: 10 knots (19 km/h; 12 mph)

SS Antenor was the first of five ships to bear the name. She was built in 1872 by Hawthorn Leslie and Company at Hebburn-on-Tyne. She was built for Alfred Holt and Company, who owned various shipping lines including the Ocean Steam Ship Company (OSSC), Nederlandsche Stoomvaart Maatschappij Oceaan (NSMO), The China Mutual Steam Navigation Company (CMSNC) and Blue Funnel Line. SS Antenor had a gross registered tonnage (GRT) of 2,074, was 322 feet (98 m) long, had a beam of 33 feet 7 inches (10.24 m) and a service speed of 10 knots. She was powered by a single screw, two cylinder compound tandem steam engines; 214 NHP, 700 IHP. Her sister ships were SS Deucalion (1872), SS Glaucus (1871) and SS Patroclus (1872).

SS Antenor served from 1872-1891 with the Ocean Steam Ship Company, and from 1891-1893 with Nederlandsche Stoomvaart Maatschappij Oceaan.

In 1893 she was sold to Baba Dokiu of Tokyo, Japan and renamed Tateyama Maru. She was later owned by Baba Michihisa, Hgashi, Iwase in Japan where she remained until 1921, when she was sold to Inukami Keigoro of Nishinomaya without a change of name.

She was finally broken up in Japan in 1929 after 57 years of service.

== See also ==
- SS Antenor (1896)
- SS Antenor (1924)
- MS Antenor (1957)
- MS Antenor (1972)
