= MS Antenor (1972) =

History

United Kingdom
- Name: Antenor (1972-1978); Sideris (1978-1989); Solbulk (1989-1996); Kyklades K (1996-2001)
- Operator: Elder Dempster Lines (1972-1977); Blue Funnel Bulkships Ltd. (1977-1978); Mermaid Sea Carriers Corp., Liberia (1978-1989); Solstad Rederi AS, Skudeneshavn, Norway (1989-1996); Aldebarran Shipping Ltd., Greece (1996-2001)
- Builder: Mitsui Osaka Engineering & Shipbuilding, Fujinagata Shipyards, Osaka, Japan
- Launched: 1972
- Identification: IMO number: 7224332; Call sign: 3FEF6
- Fate: Broken up at Chittagong, 2001

General characteristics
- Type: Bulk carrier
- Tonnage: 16,128 GT; 16,406 GRT; 27,152 DWT
- Length: 551 ft 4 in (168.05 m)
- Beam: 75 ft (23 m)
- Propulsion: 1 × 11,600 shp (8,650 kW) diesel engine
- Speed: 15.5 knots (28.7 km/h; 17.8 mph)

MS Antenor was a British bulk carrier, and the fifth of five ships to bear the name. She was built in 1972 at the Fujinagata Shipyards of the Mitsui Shipbuilding and Engineering Company in Osaka, Japan, for Alfred Holt and Company, who owned various shipping lines, including the Ocean Steam Ship Company (OSSC) and Blue Funnel Line.

MS Antenor had a gross registered tonnage (GRT) of 16,406 tons, was 551 feet 4 inches (168.05 m) long, had a beam of 75 feet (23 m) and a service speed of 15 knots (28 km/h). She was powered by an 11,600 bhp (8,700 kW) diesel engine. Her sister ships were MS Achilles (1972), MS Agamemnon (1972), MS Anchises (1973) and MS Ajax (1973). Owned by the Ocean Group, part of Alfred Holt and Company, she sailed from 1972 to 1977 for Elder Dempster Lines under Blue Funnel colours, and for Blue Funnel Bulkships Limited from 1977 to 1978.

In 1978, she was sold to Mermaid Sea Carriers Corporation of Liberia and renamed Sideris. She was operated by the Norwegian company Solstad Rederi AS from 1989 as the Solbulk, finally from 1996 under the name Kyklades K by Aldebarran Shipping Limited of Piraeus, Greece.

The ship was broken up at Chittagong, Bangladesh, in 2001.

== See also ==
- SS Antenor (1872)
- SS Antenor (1896)
- SS Antenor (1924)
- MS Antenor (1957)
