= SS Patroclus (1923) =

Coordinates: 53°43′N 14°41′W

History

United Kingdom
- Name: Patroclus
- Namesake: Patroclus
- Owner: China Mutual SN Co
- Operator: Alfred Holt & Co (1924–39); (United Kingdom) Royal Navy (1939–40)
- Port of registry: (United Kingdom) Liverpool (1924–39)
- Route: Liverpool – Far East
- Builder: Scotts Shilbuilding & Eng Co
- Yard number: 518
- Launched: 17 March 1923
- Completed: 11 June 1923
- Identification: UK official number 147218; code letters KPFD (until 1933); call sign GCXF (1934 onward)
- Fate: Sunk by torpedoes 4 November 1940

General characteristics
- Type: refrigerated cargo and passenger liner
- Tonnage: 11,314 GRT; 6,912 NRT
- Length: 498.8 ft (152.0 m)
- Beam: 62.3 ft (19.0 m)
- Depth: 26.4 ft (8.0 m)
- Propulsion: 2 × steam turbines; twin screws
- Speed: 15.5 kn (28.7 km/h)
- Capacity: 155 first class passengers
- Sensors & processing systems: wireless direction finding (by 1934)
- Armament: as armed merchant cruiser: 6 × BL 6-inch Mk XII guns; 2 × QF 3-inch 20 cwt AA guns
- Notes: sister ships: Sarpedon, Hector and Antenor

SS Patroclus was a British steam turbine passenger and refrigerated cargo liner launched in 1923. She was the third of five ships to bear the name.

In the Second World War Patroclus served as an armed merchant cruiser. A U-boat sank her in November 1940 with the loss of 76 of her complement.

== Building ==
Scotts Shipbuilding and Engineering Company built Patroclus at Greenock, Scotland. She was launched on 17 March 1923 and completed on 11 June that year.

Patroclus was the second of a set of four sister ships built for Alfred Holt and Company of Liverpool, who owned Blue Funnel Line and other shipping lines including China Mutual Steam Navigation Company. Her sisters were Sarpedon launched in 1923, and Hector and Antenor launched in 1924. All were named after characters in Homer's Iliad.

Patroclus was 498.8 ft (152.0 m) long, 62.3 ft (19.0 m) beam and had a depth of 26.4 ft (8.0 m). She had a counter stern, slightly raked stem, one funnel and two masts. She had accommodation for first class passengers only. At the request of the UK Government the four ships were built with berths for 155 first class passengers for services to the Far East. Blue Funnel Line did not expect carrying passengers to be profitable.

Patroclus's tonnages were 11,314 GRT and 6,912 NRT. She had two steam turbines driving twin screws via single-reduction gearing, which gave her a service speed of 15 knots (28 km/h). By 1934 she had been fitted with wireless direction finding equipment.

== Naval service ==
On 12 September 1939 the Admiralty requisitioned Patroclus and had her converted into an armed merchant cruiser, HMS Patroclus. Her primary armament was six BL 6-inch Mk XII naval guns and her secondary armament included two QF 3-inch 20 cwt anti-aircraft guns. Her conversion was completed on 2 January 1940.

In 1940 HMS Patroclus served on the Northern Patrol from January to April, the South Atlantic Station in May and June and the Northern and Western Patrol from July onwards.

=== Loss ===
At 2140 hrs on 3 November 1940 German submarine U-99 torpedoed the Elders and Fyffes banana boat Casanare in the Western Approaches west of Bloody Foreland in Ireland. Patroclus and another AMC, HMS Laurentic, responded to Casanare's wireless distress message. When they arrived, U-99 attacked Laurentic but Patroclus concentrated on searching for survivors from Casanare.

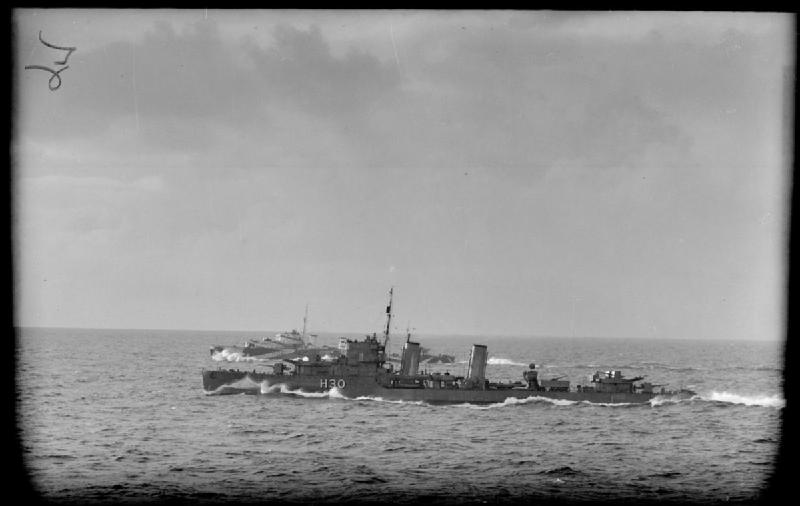
HMS Beagle rescued 230 survivors from Patroclus

U-99 damaged Laurentic and then attacked Patroclus from a range of only 300 metres. U-99 hit Patroclus with torpedoes at 0002 hrs, 0022 hrs and 0044 hrs. Then at 0058 hrs U-99 fired four rounds from her deck gun, two of which hit Patroclus. U-99 then herself came under fire and took evasive action. U-99 hit Patroclus with a fourth torpedo at 0118 hrs, and then withdrew to search for Casanare. At 0239 hrs an RAF Short Sunderland flying boat passed overhead, forcing U-99 to dive.

At 0404 hrs U-99 resurfaced and resumed her attack. At 0453 hrs she fired a torpedo that hit and sank Laurentic. At 0516 hrs U-99 torpedoed Patroclus again, but the impact seemed to have little effect. At 0525 hrs U-99 hit Patroclus with a final torpedo, which broke the ship's back. Her stern capsized and her bow slowly sank. 76 of her complement were lost, including her commander, Captain Gerald Wynter. The destroyer HMS Hesperus then arrived, drove U-99 away and rescued survivors from Laurentic. The destroyer HMS Beagle rescued 230 survivors from Patroclus.

== Bibliography ==
- Harnack, Edwin P (1930) [1903]. All About Ships & Shipping (3rd ed.). London: Faber and Faber.
- Osborne, Richard; Spong, Harry & Grover, Tom (2007). Armed Merchant Cruisers 1878–1945. Windsor: World Warship Society. ISBN 978-0-9543310-8-5.
- Talbot-Booth, EC (1936). Ships and the Sea (Third ed.). London: Sampson Low, Marston & Co Ltd.
