= SS Antenor (1924) =

History
- Name: Antenor (1924–39; 1941–53) HMS Antenor (1939–41)
- Namesake: Antenor
- Owner: China Mutual SN Co
- Operator: Alfred Holt & Co (1924–39; 1941–53); (United Kingdom) Royal Navy (1939–41)
- Port of registry: (United Kingdom) Liverpool (1924–39; 1941–53)
- Route: Liverpool – Far East
- Builder: Palmers Shipbuilding & Iron Co
- Yard number: 945
- Launched: 30 September 1924
- Completed: March 1925
- Acquired: 13 September 1939
- Commissioned: January 1940
- Reclassified: armed merchant cruiser 1939–41, troop ship 1941–46
- Identification: UK official number 147292; code letters KSBV (until 1933); call sign GLFC (1934 onward)
- Fate: Scrapped 1953

General characteristics
- Type: refrigerated cargo and passenger liner
- Tonnage: 11,174 GRT; tonnage under deck 8,590; 6,809 NRT
- Length: 497.7 ft (151.7 m)
- Beam: 62.2 ft (19.0 m)
- Depth: 35 ft (11 m)
- Propulsion: 4 × steam turbines; twin screws
- Speed: 15 knots (28 km/h)
- Capacity: berths for first class passengers only
- Sensors & processing systems: wireless direction finding (by 1934)
- Armament: as armed merchant cruiser: 6 × BL 6-inch Mk XII guns; 2 × QF 3-inch 20 cwt AA guns
- Notes: sister ships: Sarpedon, Patroclus and Hector

SS Antenor was a UK steam turbine passenger and refrigerated cargo liner launched in 1924. She was the third of five ships to bear the name.

In the Second World War Antenor served first as an armed merchant cruiser and then as a troop ship.

== Building ==
Palmers Shipbuilding and Iron Company Ltd built Antenor at Jarrow, England. She was launched on 30 September 1924 and completed in 1925.

Antenor was the last of a set of four sister ships built for Alfred Holt and Company of Liverpool, who owned Blue Funnel Line and other shipping lines including China Mutual Steam Navigation Company. Her sisters were Sarpedon and Patroclus launched in 1923 and Hector launched in 1924. All were named after characters in Homer's Iliad.

Antenor was 497.7 ft (151.7 m) long, 62.2 ft (19.0 m) beam and had a depth of 35 ft (11 m). She had a counter stern, slightly raked stem, one funnel and two masts. She had accommodation for first class passengers only.

Antenor's tonnages were 11,174 GRT and 6,809 NRT. She had four steam turbines driving twin screws via single-reduction gearing, which gave her a service speed of 15 knots (28 km/h). By 1934 Antenor had been fitted with wireless direction finding equipment.

== Civilian service ==
In 1925 Antenor made her maiden voyage from Liverpool to the Far East.

By the 1930s she was running on Blue Funnel's Eastern Service. A timetable for the Eastern Service, issued in September 1937 for the period September 1937 – October 1938, lists the ports of call as: Liverpool, Marseille, Port Said, Colombo, Penang, Singapore, Hong Kong, Shanghai, Yokohama. Kobe and Aden were additional ports of call on the return voyage.

In November 1938 the Antenor carried five giant pandas, caught in Sichuan in China, from Hong Kong to Europe. On the voyage some of the pandas broke out of their cage on her poop deck. The pandas were the first to be brought to Europe in captivity.

== World War II service ==
On 13 September 1939 the Admiralty requisitioned Antenor and had her converted into an armed merchant cruiser, HMS Antenor, pennant F21. Her primary armament was six BL 6-inch Mk XII naval guns and her secondary armament included two QF 3-inch 20 cwt anti-aircraft guns. She served in the Mediterranean Fleet from January 1940 to April 1940, and the East Indies Station from May 1940 until October 1941.

On 31 October 1941 the Admiralty returned Antenor to her owners and was converted into a troop ship for the Ministry of War Transport (MoWT). She served in the invasion of Normandy in 1944.

== Post-war civilian service ==
Antenor returned to commercial service with the Ocean Steam Ship Company in February 1946 and continued to serve until 1953 when she was sold to Hughes Bolckow (shipbreakers) for demolition. She arrived at the breaker's yard at Blyth, England on 19 July 1953.

A model of Antenor, together with her ship's wheel, an oak bench and a decorative glass window from the ship are displayed at Maryport Maritime Museum, Maryport, Cumbria.

== See also ==
- SS Antenor (1872)
- SS Antenor (1896)
- MS Antenor (1957)
- MS Antenor (1972)

== Bibliography ==
- Harnack, Edwin P (1930) [1903]. All About Ships & Shipping (3rd ed.). London: Faber and Faber.
- Osborne, Richard; Spong, Harry; Grover, Tom (2007). Armed Merchant Cruisers 1878–1945. Windsor: World Warship Society. ISBN 978-0-9543310-8-5.
- Talbot-Booth, EC (1936). Ships and the Sea (Third ed.). London: Sampson Low, Marston & Co Ltd.
- White, Horace (1961). Battleship Wharf. London: Hughes Bolckow Ltd. – a history of Hughes Bolckow Ltd, shipbreakers
