= HMS Hector (F45) =

1924 armed merchant cruiser of the British Royal Navy

History

United Kingdom
- Name: Hector
- Namesake: Hector
- Owner: Ocean Steam Ship Co
- Operator: Alfred Holt & Co (1924–39); (United Kingdom) Royal Navy (1939–42)
- Port of registry: (United Kingdom) Liverpool (1924–39)
- Route: Liverpool – Far East
- Builder: Scotts Shilbuilding & Eng Co
- Cost: £419,254
- Yard number: 521
- Launched: 18 June 1924
- Completed: 19 September 1924
- Commissioned: 20 December 1939
- Reclassified: Armed merchant cruiser 1939–42
- Identification: UK official number 147282; Code letters KRLC (until 1933); Call sign GCBQ (1934 onward)
- Fate: Sunk by air attack 5 April 1942; Refloated and scrapped 1946

General characteristics
- Type: Refrigerated cargo and passenger liner
- Tonnage: 11,198 GRT; 6,841 NRT
- Length: 498.8 ft (152.0 m)
- Beam: 62.3 ft (19.0 m)
- Draught: 26.4 ft (8.0 m)
- Propulsion: steam turbines; twin screws
- Speed: 15 knots (28 km/h)
- Sensors & processing systems: wireless direction finding (by 1934)
- Armament: as armed merchant cruiser: 6 × BL 6-inch Mk XII guns; 2 × QF 3-inch 20 cwt AA guns
- Notes: sister ships: Sarpedon, Patroclus and Antenor

HMS Hector was a UK steam turbine passenger and refrigerated cargo liner launched in 1924. She was the fourth of six civilian ships to bear the name.

In the Second World War Hector was converted into an armed merchant cruiser. She was the eleventh HMS Hector in the history of the Royal Navy.

A Japanese air raid sank her in Ceylon in 1942. In 1946 she was raised and scrapped.

== Building ==
Scotts Shipbuilding and Engineering Company built Hector in Greenock, Scotland. Isobel Cripps launched her on 18 June 1924 and she was completed on 16 September.

Hector was the third of a set of four sister ships built for Alfred Holt and Company of Liverpool, who owned Blue Funnel Line and other shipping lines including the Ocean Steam Ship Company. Her sisters were Sarpedon and Patroclus launched in 1923, and Antenor launched in 1924. All were named after characters in Homer's Iliad.

Hector was 498.8 ft (152.0 m) long, 62.3 ft (19.0 m) beam and had a depth of 26.4 ft (8.0 m). She had a counter stern, slightly raked stem, one funnel and two masts. She had accommodation for first class passengers only.

Hector's tonnages were 11,198 GRT and 6,841 NRT. She had steam turbines driving twin screws via single-reduction gearing, which gave her a service speed of 15 knots (28 km/h). By 1934 Patroclus had been fitted with wireless direction finding equipment.

== Civilian service ==
Scotts delivered Hector to Blue Funnel on 23 September 1924 and she made her maiden voyage from Liverpool to the Far East on 24 September 1924. This was the regular route for Hector and her three sisters.

== Naval service ==
On 27 August 1939, a few days before the outbreak of the Second World War, the Admiralty requisitioned Hector and had her converted into an armed merchant cruiser. Her primary armament was six BL 6-inch Mk XII naval guns and her secondary armament included two QF 3-inch 20 cwt anti-aircraft guns. Her conversion was completed on 20 December 1939.

Hector served on the New Zealand Station from January to July 1940 and the East Indies Station from August 1940 until February 1942. In March 1942 she was transferred to the Eastern Fleet.

=== Loss ===
Hector was dry docked in Colombo in Ceylon to prepare for decommissioning. On 5 April 1942 Japanese carrier-based aircraft attacked the port in the Easter Sunday Raid. The Japanese force had hoped to catch remnants of the Eastern Fleet in harbour, but most of the fleet had left earlier. Japanese aircraft attacked the few targets they could find, one of which was Hector. She was hit by five bombs that set her on fire, and after several hours she sank. The air raid also sank the destroyer HMS Tenedos in the harbour. The cruisers HMS Cornwall and Dorsetshire were sunk at sea later that day.

The Admiralty returned the wreck of Hector to the Ocean Steamship Company on 20 April 1942, but because of the war she was not refloated until 1946. She was beached 5 nautical miles (9 km) north of Colombo for assessment. She was judged to be beyond economical repair, and was sold for scrap.

== Bibliography ==
- Harnack, Edwin P (1930) [1903]. All About Ships & Shipping (3rd ed.). London: Faber and Faber.
- Osborne, Richard; Spong, Harry & Grover, Tom (2007). Armed Merchant Cruisers 1878–1945. Windsor: World Ship Society. ISBN 978-0-9543310-8-5.
- Shores, Christopher; Cull, Brian; Izawa, Yasuho (1993). Bloody Shambles: Volume Two: The Defence of Sumatra to the Fall of Burma. London: Grub Street. ISBN 0-948817-67-4.
- Talbot-Booth, EC (1936). Ships and the Sea (Third ed.). London: Sampson Low, Marston & Co Ltd.
