= SS Antenor (1896) =

History

United Kingdom
- Name: SS Antenor
- Owner: Alfred Holt and Company
- Operator: Blue Funnel Line; Nederlandsche Stoomvaart Maatschappij Oceaan
- Builder: Workman, Clark and Company, Belfast
- Cost: £62,796
- Launched: 11 June 1896
- Fate: Sold, 1925; Broken up, 1926

General characteristics
- Tonnage: 5,570 GRT
- Length: 422 ft (129 m)
- Beam: 49 ft (15 m)
- Propulsion: Triple expansion steam engine, 4,000 ihp (2,983 kW)
- Speed: 10 knots (19 km/h; 12 mph)

SS Antenor was the second of five ships to bear the name. She was built in 1896 by Workman, Clark and Company at Belfast, Northern Ireland. She was built for Alfred Holt and Company, who owned various shipping lines including the Nederlandsche Stoomvaart Maatschappij Oceaan (NSMO) and Blue Funnel Line. SS Antenor had a gross registered tonnage (GRT) of 5,570, was 422 feet long, had a beam of 49 feet 4 inches and a service speed of 10 knots. She was powered by a triple expansion steam engine, 4000 IHP. Her sister ships were SS Glaucus (1896), SS Patroclus (1896) and SS Prometheus (1896). She was the last of the class and cost £62,796, £5 cheaper than her sister ship SS Patroclus.

SS Antenor was transferred in 1914 to Nederlandsche Stoomvaart Maatschappij Oceaan, but later reverted to the British flag.

On 9 February 1918, in the final year of the First World War, she was hit by a torpedo whilst in the Mediterranean. With assistance, she was able to make port for repairs.

In 1925 she was sold to Atlantide S. A. per Imprese Marittima of Genoa, Italy and renamed Fortunato. In the following year, 1926, she was broken up in Italy, after 28 years of service.

== See also ==
- SS Antenor (1872)
- SS Antenor (1924)
- MS Antenor (1957)
- MS Antenor (1972)
