= Liverpool Chinese Seamen's Union =

Trade union in Liverpool, UK

The Liverpool Chinese Seamen's Union was a trade union representing Chinese merchant seamen who lived in Liverpool.

It was affiliated to the Chinese Communist Party and supported by British left-wing workers who believed in socialist internationalism. It had links to the Chinese Seamen's Union in Australia.

In 1942, the union went on strike over pay disparities between Chinese and British seamen's pay. The strike continued until April of that year, at which point the sailors were given a pay increase of £2 a month and the standard £10 a month "war risk" bonus.

== See also ==
- Home Office 213/926 – compulsory repatriation of Chinese seamen by the Home Office
