= SS Sarpedon (1923) =

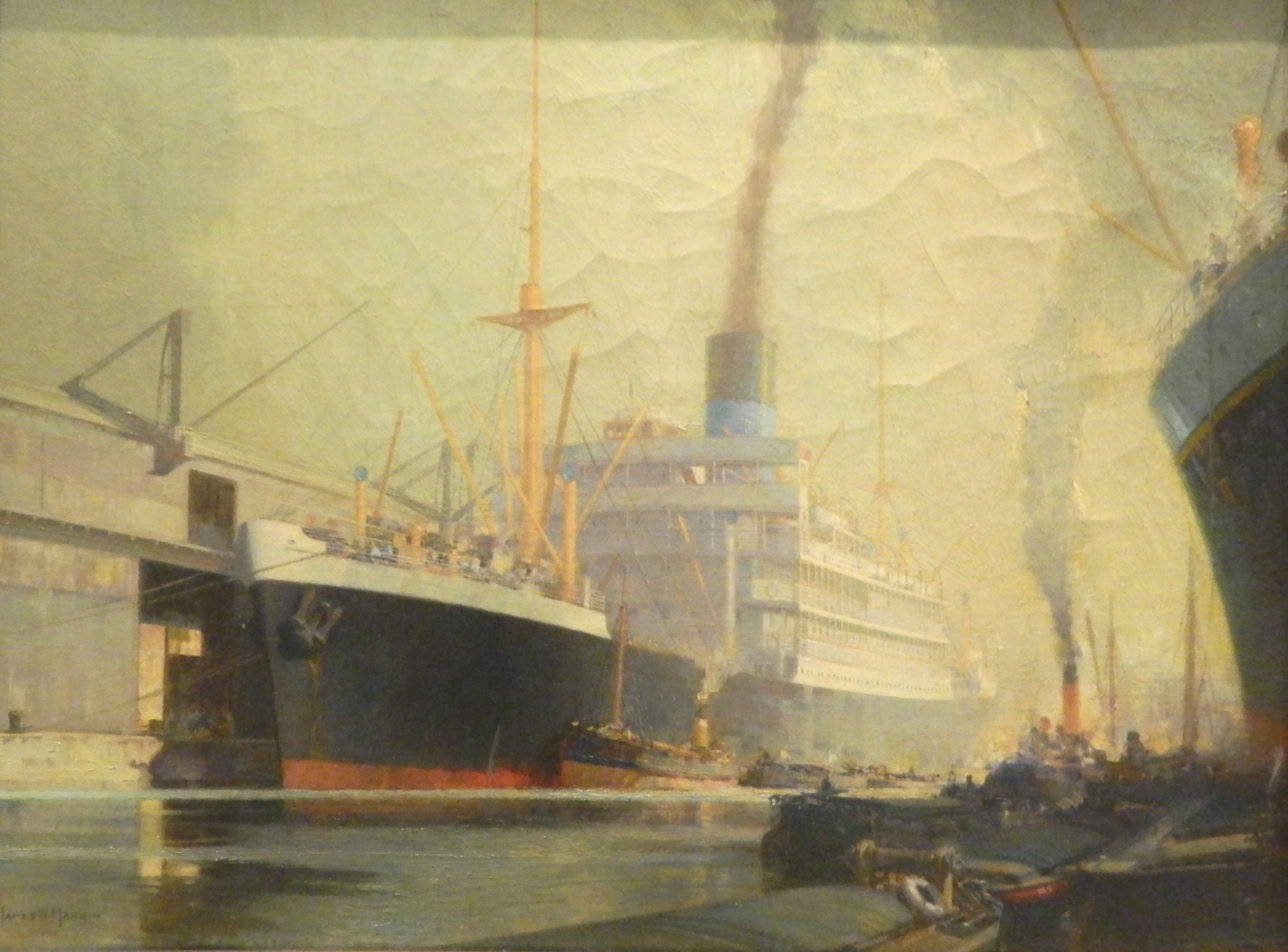
- Sarpedon in Gladstone Dock, Liverpool; Oil on canvas by JS Mann

History

United Kingdom
- Name: Sarpedon
- Namesake: Sarpedon
- Owner: Ocean Steam Ship Co
- Operator: Alfred Holt & Co
- Port of registry: Liverpool
- Route: Liverpool – Far East
- Builder: Cammell, Laird & Co
- Yard number: 893
- Launched: 2 February 1923
- Completed: June 1923
- Identification: UK official number 147214; Code letters KPBV (until 1933); Call sign GDRC (1934 onward)
- Fate: Scrapped after 5 June 1953

General characteristics
- Type: Refrigerated cargo and passenger liner
- Tonnage: 11,321 GRT; 6,921 NRT
- Length: 499.0 ft (152.1 m)
- Beam: 62.3 ft (19.0 m)
- Depth: 34.9 ft (10.6 m)
- Propulsion: 4 × steam turbines; twin screws
- Speed: 15 kn (28 km/h)
- Capacity: 155 first class passengers
- Notes: sister ships: Patroclus, Hector and Antenor

SS Sarpedon was a UK steam turbine passenger and refrigerated cargo liner launched in 1923. She was the fourth of six ships to bear the name.

== Building ==
Cammell, Laird & Co built Sarpedon in Birkenhead, England. She was launched on 2 February 1923 and completing her that June.

Sarpedon was the first of a set of four sister ships built for Alfred Holt and Company of Liverpool, who owned Blue Funnel Line and other shipping lines including the Ocean Steam Ship Company. Her sisters were Patroclus launched in 1923, and Hector and Antenor launched in 1924. All were named after characters in Homer's Iliad.

Sarpedon was 499.0 ft (152.1 m) long, 62.3 ft (19.0 m) beam and had a depth of 34.9 ft (10.6 m). She had a counter stern, slightly raked stem, one funnel and two masts. She had accommodation for first class passengers only. At the request of the UK Government the four ships were built with berths for 155 first class passengers for services to the Far East. Blue Funnel Line did not expect carrying passengers to be profitable.

Sarpedon's tonnages were 11,321 GRT and 6,921 NRT. She had four steam turbines driving twin screws via single-reduction gearing, which gave her a service speed of 15 knots (28 km/h). By 1934 Patroclus had been fitted with wireless direction finding equipment.

== Service ==
In peacetime Sarpedon and her three sisters sailed a regular route between Liverpool and the Far East.

In the Second World War Patroclus, Hector and Antenor were requisitioned and converted into armed merchant cruisers, but Sarpedon remained in civilian service. In March 1940 she sailed on her usual route to China, leaving Liverpool on 3 March with Convoy OB 103 which dispersed at sea.

But thereafter Sarpedon was taken off her usual route. She sailed partly in convoys and partly unescorted.

Sarpedon sailed in two HX convoys from Halifax, Nova Scotia to Liverpool: HX 144 in August 1941 and HX 185 in April 1942. She was in Australia for Christmas 1941 and again in May 1943. She called at Port Moresby in Papua in January 1942, shortly before the Japanese invasion of New Guinea. She passed through the Panama Canal in October 1942 and January 1943.

After the Armistice with Italy in September 1943, the Mediterranean was less dangerous for Allied shipping. Sarpedon passed through the Suez Canal in May and July 1944. Her final convoy of the war was MKS 93G, which left Casablanca in Morocco on 5 April 1945 and reached Liverpool on 14 April, three weeks before VE Day.

Sarpedon and Antenor were the only two of the four sisters to survive the war.

== Fate ==
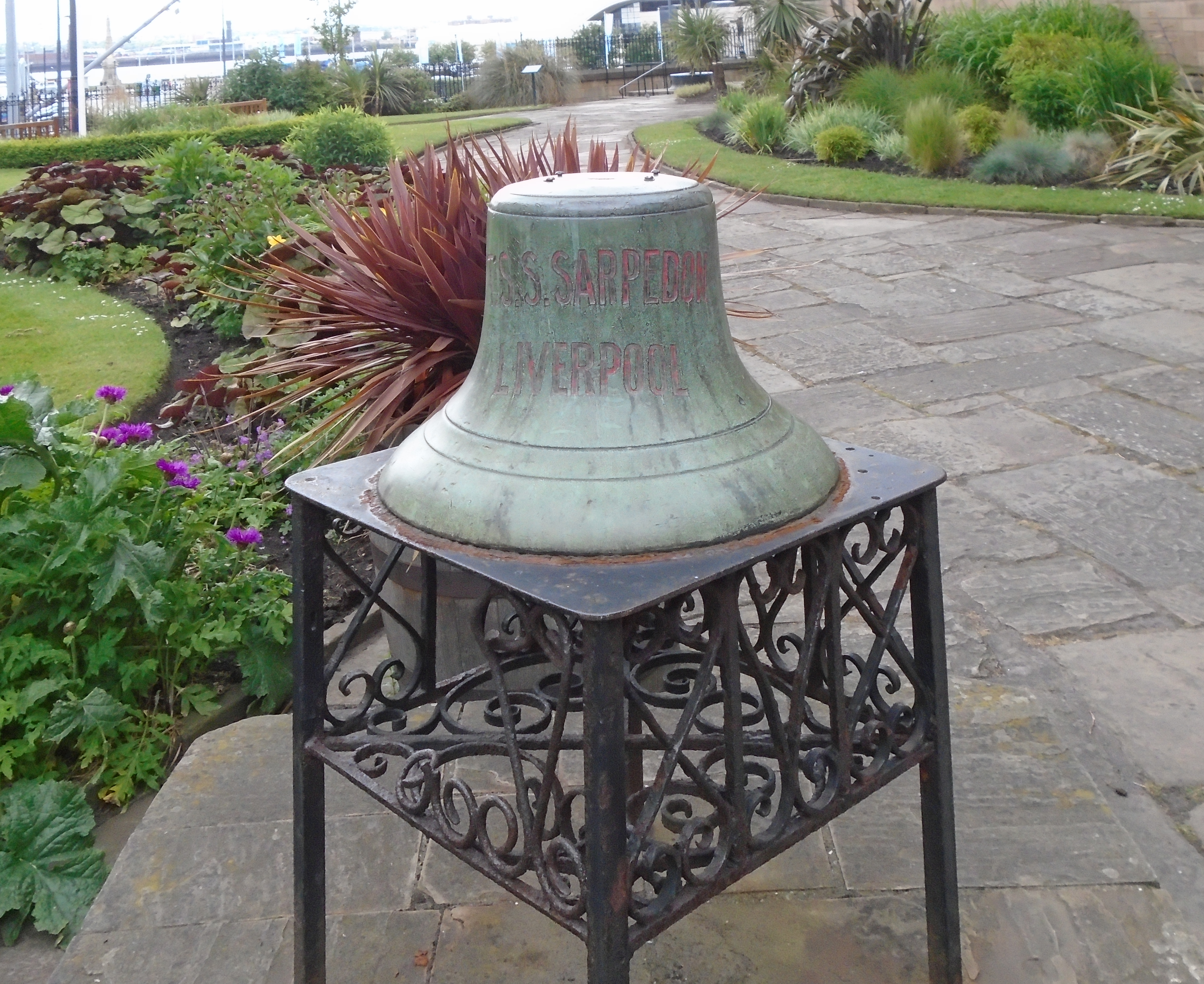
Sarpedon's bell in the yard of the parish church of Our Lady and Saint Nicholas, Liverpool

Sarpedon arrived at Newport, Wales on 5 June 1953 to be scrapped by John Cashmore Ltd.

Sarpedon's bell is preserved in the yard of the parish church of Our Lady and Saint Nicholas, Liverpool, opposite the Pier Head.

== Bibliography ==
- Harnack, Edwin P (1930) [1903]. All About Ships & Shipping (3rd ed.). London: Faber and Faber.
- Talbot-Booth, EC (1936). Ships and the Sea (Third ed.). London: Sampson Low, Marston & Co Ltd.
