= SS Cyclops =

British steamship sunk in 1942

Coordinates: 41°51′N 63°48′W

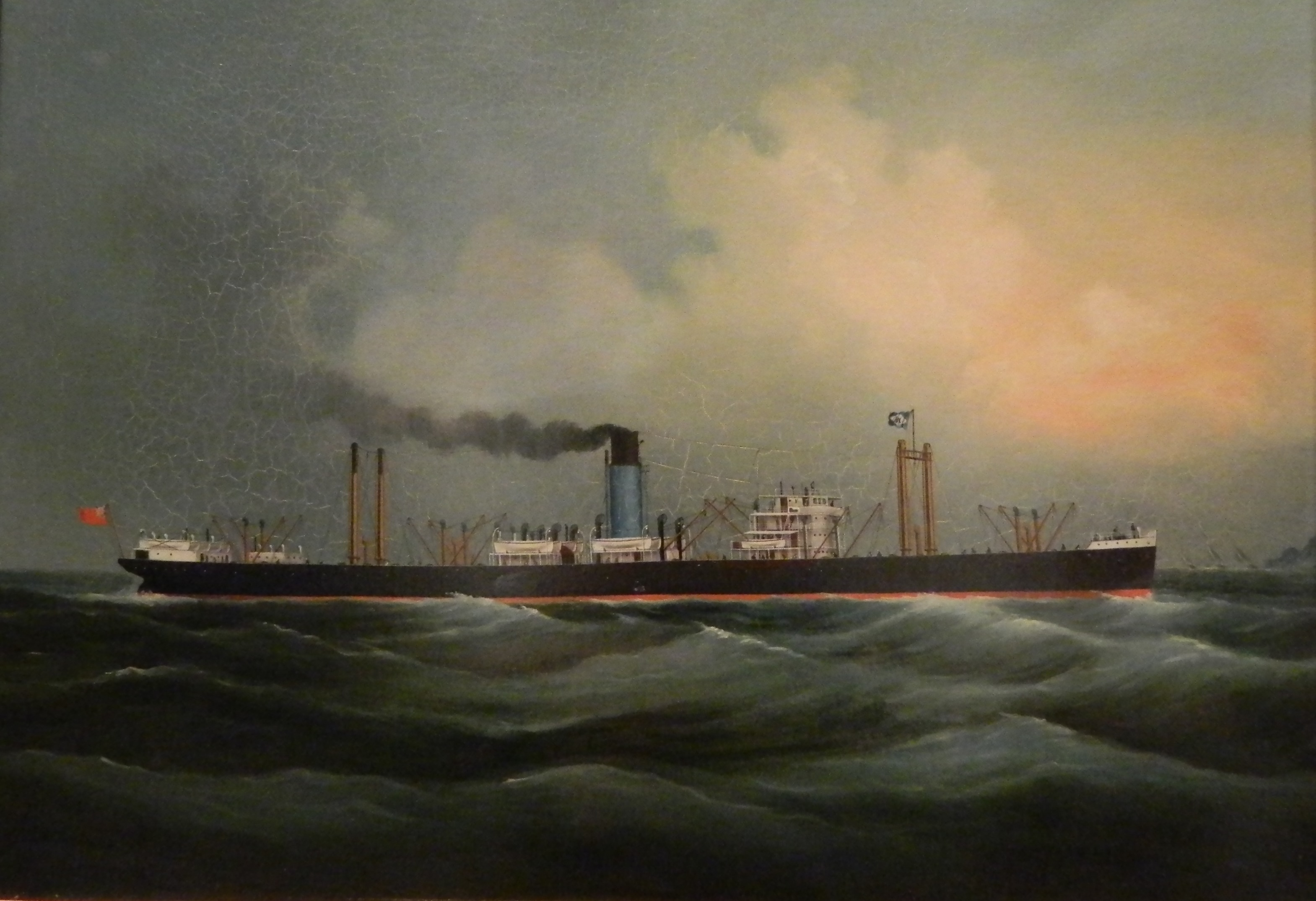
- "Cyclops approaching Hong Kong" painting in the Museum of Liverpool, artist unknown

History

United Kingdom
- Name: Cyclops
- Namesake: cyclops in Greek mythology
- Owner: Ocean Steam Ship Co
- Operator: Alfred Holt & Co
- Port of registry: Liverpool
- Builder: D&W Henderson, Glasgow
- Yard number: 449
- Launched: 23 March 1906
- Completed: 1906
- Identification: UK official number 123978; code letters HGNT (until 1933); Call sign GTF (until 1933); call sign GPZK (from 1934)
- Fate: Sunk, 11 January 1942

General characteristics
- Class & type: cargo steamship
- Tonnage: 9,076 GRT; tonnage under deck 6,379; 5,786 NRT
- Length: 485.0 ft (147.8 m)
- Beam: 58.2 ft (17.7 m)
- Depth: 39.5 ft (12.0 m)
- Installed power: 585 NHP
- Propulsion: 2 × 3-cylinder triple-expansion engines; twin screws
- Speed: 13.5 knots (25 km/h)
- Crew: 96 plus 7 DEMS gunners
- Sensors & processing systems: wireless direction finding
- Armament: DEMS (in wartime)

SS Cyclops was a British cargo steamship of Alfred Holt and Company (Blue Funnel Line). She was built in Glasgow in 1906, served in both the First and Second World Wars and survived two German submarine attacks in 1917. The German submarine U-123 sank her in January 1942 off the coast of Nova Scotia, killing 87 of the men aboard her. This was the first attack of the Kriegsmarine's Unternehmen Paukenschlag ("Operation Drumbeat") to destroy Allied merchant shipping in the Western Atlantic.

This Cyclops was the second of four Alfred Holt ships to bear the name. The first was a two-masted sail and steamship built in 1880, transferred in 1894 to Alfred Holt's Dutch joint venture Nederlandsche Stoomvaart Maatschappij Oceaan and sold in 1902 to Uruguayan buyers who renamed her Iberia. The third was a motor ship built in 1948, renamed Automedon in 1975 and scrapped in 1977. The fourth was built in 1975, sold to Greek buyers in 1983 and renamed Procyon.

== Building and equipment ==
D&W Henderson & Co of Glasgow built Cyclops in 1906 for Ocean Steam Ship Co, Alfred Holt's ship-owning company. She had twin screws, each powered by its own three-cylinder triple-expansion steam engine. Between them the two engines developed 585 nhp and gave the ship a speed of 13.5 knots (25 km/h).

By 1914 Cyclops had been equipped for wireless telegraphy, operating on the 300, 450 and 600 metre wavelengths. Her wireless had a range of only 90 nautical miles (170 km). Her call sign was GTF.

By 1933 Cyclops was equipped with wireless direction finding.

== First World War service ==
On 11 February 1917 the German Type UB III submarine SM U-60 unsuccessfully chased Cyclops southwest of Ireland. On 11 April that year west of the Isles of Scilly Cyclops evaded a torpedo fired by another Type UB III submarine, SM U-55.

== Second World War service ==
Cyclops had a speed of 13.5 knots (25 km/h), and when the UK entered the Second World War in 1939 she was 33 years old. Nevertheless, she made most of her wartime voyages unescorted, and seldom had the protection of a convoy.

In September 1939 Cyclops was in the Far East. She called at Shanghai, Hong Kong and Saigon before reaching Singapore on 1 October. She left on 23 October, called at Penang in Malaya and then crossed the Indian Ocean via Colombo in Ceylon to Suez. She passed through the Suez Canal to Port Said, where she joined Convoy HG 9. This left on 19 November and reached Liverpool on 8 December.

Cyclops spent Christmas 1939 in Liverpool and left port on 30 December. She reached Southampton on New Year's Day 1940 and then made two round trips across the English Channel to Le Havre and back. Her movements, if any, for the next six weeks are unrecorded. Cyclops left Southampton on 9 March and reached the Firth of Clyde three days later. She left the Clyde on 25 March and reached the Downs roadstead in the North Sea by 31 March.

In April and May 1940 Cyclops took part in the Franco-British Norwegian Campaign. She left Leith with Convoy NM 1 on 15 April, reached Scapa Flow the next day, and then continued to Narvik where she arrived on 24 April. Three days later she left, reached Le Havre on 1 May and then returned to northern Norway. On 18 May she left Harstad under naval escort, reaching the Firth of Clyde five days later.

In June 1940 Cyclops took part in Operation Aerial, the evacuation of Allied forces from western France. She left the Clyde on 7 June, called at Plymouth 8–13 June, reached Brest in Brittany the next day and on 16 June returned to Plymouth. On 21 June she left Dartmouth and four days later she sailed from Saint-Jean-de-Luz in southwest France, reaching Cardiff on 29 June.

After calls at Newport and Milford Haven, Cyclops returned to deep ocean service. She left Milford Haven on 19 July, joining Convoy OB 186 which then dispersed in the North Atlantic on 22 July. She called at Durban 22–31 August and Aden 14–19 September. There she joined Convoy BN 5, which was en route from Bombay to Suez. She passed through the Suez Canal, called at Port Said, and reached Alexandria on 30 September. She left Alexandria on 19 October, called at Haifa in Mandatory Palestine and got back to Alexandria on 25 October.

Cyclops left Alexandria on 6 November 1940, passed through the Suez Canal and reached Port Sudan on 15 November. Shere she joined Convoy BS 8B, which left port on 18 November and dispersed off Aden three days later. She called at Mombasa in Kenya from 29 November to 1 December, Durban 9–21 December and Cape Town from Christmas Day to 28 December. She spent New Year's Day 1941 at sea, reaching Freetown in Sierra Leone on 12 January. There she joined Convoy SL 63, which left Freetown on 20 January and reached Liverpool on 9 February. Cyclops' cargo on this voyage was cottonseed cake.

On 12 April 1941 Cyclops left Liverpool with Convoy OB 209, which dispersed in the North Atlantic on 19 April. She called at Cape Town on 17–24 May, Durban from 28 May to 2 June and Aden on 15 June before reaching Suez on 21 June. She passed through the Suez Canal, left Port Said on 9 July and was in Alexandria 10–18 July before returning to Port Said. She entered the canal again on 19 July, called at Aden from 28 July to 6 August and sailed to the Far East, where tensions between Japan and the West were building up towards the Pacific War. She was in Singapore 20–22 August, Hong Kong from 29 August to 3 October, and Singapore again 9–22 October.

Cyclops then sailed to Australasia. She was in Fremantle, Western Australia 2–10 November 1941 and then crossed the Tasman Sea to New Zealand. On 1 December she left Auckland for home, spending Christmas 1941 crossing the Pacific Ocean and reaching Balboa, Panama on 29 December. She spent New Year's Day 1942 in Panama, passed through the Panama Canal and on 2 January left Cristóbal, Colón for Halifax, Nova Scotia with the intention of joining an eastbound HX-series convoy to Liverpool.

== Loss ==
Cyclops' complement, including her Master, Leslie Webber Kersley, was 96 officers and men plus seven DEMS gunners. She was also carrying another 78 Chinese sailors as passengers to join other merchant ships at Halifax or in the UK. At least one of the passengers was the survivor of a previous sinking.

Position off Nova Scotia where U-123 sank Cyclops

After nightfall 11 January 1942 about 125 nautical miles (232 km) southeast of Cape Sable, Nova Scotia the German Type IXB submarine U-123 fired a G7a torpedo at Cyclops at close range, hitting her starboard side abreast of her Nos. 6 and 7 holds. After settling by the stern she stayed afloat, but Captain Kersley's damage assessment was that she could not be saved. Ordering the ship to be abandoned, Kersley also ensured that the radio officer had both sent a distress signal and received an acknowledgement from a shore radio station.

As Cyclops' lifeboats were launched and got clear, Kersley and some of his officers remained aboard to ensure that everyone who was still alive had left. 29 minutes after the first attack U-123 fired a second torpedo from one of her stern tubes, hitting Cyclops' port side. The ship immediately started to break up and sank within five minutes. Some of those remaining aboard managed to reach a liferaft that the Chief Officer had released only minutes before.

The Royal Canadian Navy Bangor-class minesweeper HMCS Red Deer rescued Captain Kersley, 55 crew, six DEMS gunners and 33 passengers and landed them at Halifax. 40 crew, 46 passengers and one gunner had been killed; some by the explosion and sinking; others by exposure in the cold water. One of Cyclops' survivors, Midshipman Desmond Stewart, was awarded Lloyd's War Medal for Bravery at Sea.

== Successor ships ==
Cyclops was one of at least 30 ships that Alfred Holt lost in the Second World War. After the German and Japanese unconditional surrenders in 1945 the company started to restore its fleet. In 1948 Scotts Shipbuilding and Engineering Company of Greenock, Renfrewshire completed a new Cyclops that was a 7,632 GRT motor ship. In July 1975 she was renamed Automedon and in December she was transferred to Elder Dempster Lines. She was scrapped in 1977.

The reason for renaming the 1948 ship was to release the Cyclops name for a new 32,576 GRT product carrier that Van der Giessen de Noord of Krimpen aan den IJssel built for Alfred Holt in 1975. This ship was in the fleet until 1983 when she was sold to Greek buyers and renamed Procyon. She was subsequently renamed Nova Europa and then Demos, latterly registered in Panama.

== Sources ==
- The Marconi Press Agency Ltd (1914). The Year Book of Wireless Telegraphy and Telephony. London: The Marconi Press Agency Ltd.
- Slader, John (1988). The Red Duster at War. London: William Kimber & Co Ltd. pp. 51, 177, 178. ISBN 0-7183-0679-1.
