= Herbert Gladstone McDavid =

British shipping company executive

Sir Herbert Gladstone "Mac" McDavid CBE MSM
- Born: 19 May 1898; Liverpool, England
- Died: 14 October 1966 (aged 68); London, England
- Employer(s): Glen Line, Alfred Holt & Co
- Known for: shipping company senior executive and war-time government minister and advisor

Sir Herbert Gladstone "Mac" McDavid CBE MSM (1898–1966) was from Liverpool, UK. He was awarded the Meritorious Service Medal in the First World War. He ultimately became chairman, managing director and partner of shipping companies (Glen Line, Alfred Holt & Co), deputy director of sea transport in the UK Ministry of War Transport during the Second World War and was knighted for organising shipping during the Suez Crisis in 1956.

== Early and personal life ==
Herbert Gladstone McDavid was born in Liverpool on 19 May 1898. His parents were Denis and Octavia (née Christian) McDavid. He was the eldest of their five children. His father worked as a tailor's cutter. His maternal grandfather, Jacob Christian, was a ship's steward from Antigua who had settled in Liverpool.

McDavid was educated at the Liverpool Institute and started working for Alfred Holt & Company in 1915, where two of his maternal uncles were also employed.

In the First World War, McDavid enlisted when he was 18 in 1916 and was initially in the UK in the Army Reserve and then Liverpool Scottish Battalion. In May 1917 he was sent to France and was rapidly made a prisoner of war. He learnt German to become an interpreter, failed in an escape attempt and became involved in running the prison camp.

McDavid did not marry. He was ill from the early 1950s onwards. He died in London on 14 October 1966.

== Career in shipping ==
McDavid returned to Alfred Holt & Company in 1919 and worked in management positions for the company's Blue Funnel Line that provided cargo and passenger services to the Far East from Liverpool. In 1936 he was transferred to London to join the management of the recently acquired Glen Line with 10 ships that provided similar services but from ports in eastern England. He became a director in May 1938, under C. E. Wurtzburg, the managing director from 1937.

The company had ordered more ships and some were in Germany awaiting delivery when the Second World War started. McDavid, with assistance from the Admiralty, instigated an attempt to seize these ships but it was unsuccessful. The existing Glen ships were requisitioned and McDavid became Deputy Director of Sea Transport at the Ministry of War Transport in 1941. He developed improved methods for loading and unloading military shipping and had a leading role in planning landings in north Africa, Sicily, Italy and Normandy. At the end of the war he took on the role of Director of Sea Transport and oversaw the return to peacetime conditions.

In 1946 McDavid returned to the Glen Line. He became managing director in 1952, and then chairman in June 1954. He had further appointments as chairman and managing director of McGregor, Gow and Holland Ltd (a shipping agent and insurance company), and chairman of McGregor, Gow and Robinson Ltd. His views that Alfred Holt & Company needed more, faster, ships to work for Glen Line from eastern English ports led to an order for four Glenlyon class ships in 1960 that were delivered in 1962–3. Four further Glenalmond class ships were ordered in 1963.

McDavid retired from Glen Line at the end of 1964 but continued to hold several senior appointments. He was a part-time non-executive director of Glen Line until late 1965 as well as a board member of the Ocean Steamship Co. Ltd and a partner in Alfred Holt & Co. He was also a member of shipping organisations such as the Baltic Exchange, the General Council of British Shipping, the Worshipful Company of Shipwrights, and the Port of London Authority (1958 to 1964). In 1956 he advised the government on shipping matters during the Suez Crisis.

== Awards ==
McDavid was awarded the meritorious service medal after the First World War for his service in the prisoner of war camp. In 1944 he was appointed CBE for his work towards the Normandy landings. In 1947 he was made an officer of the Order of Orange Nassau by the Netherlands and received the American Medal of Freedom with silver palm. He was knighted in 1956 for his work during the Suez Crisis.
