= Antenor (writer) =

Antenor (Ancient Greek: Ἀντήνωρ) was a Greek writer of uncertain date, wrote a work upon the history of Crete, which on account of its excellence was called Delta (Δέλτα), inasmuch as, says Ptolemy Hephaestion, the Cretans called that which is good Delton (Δέλτον).
