= Chinatown, Liverpool =

Area of Liverpool, England

Coordinates: 53°23′57″N 02°58′38″W

Liverpool Chinatown
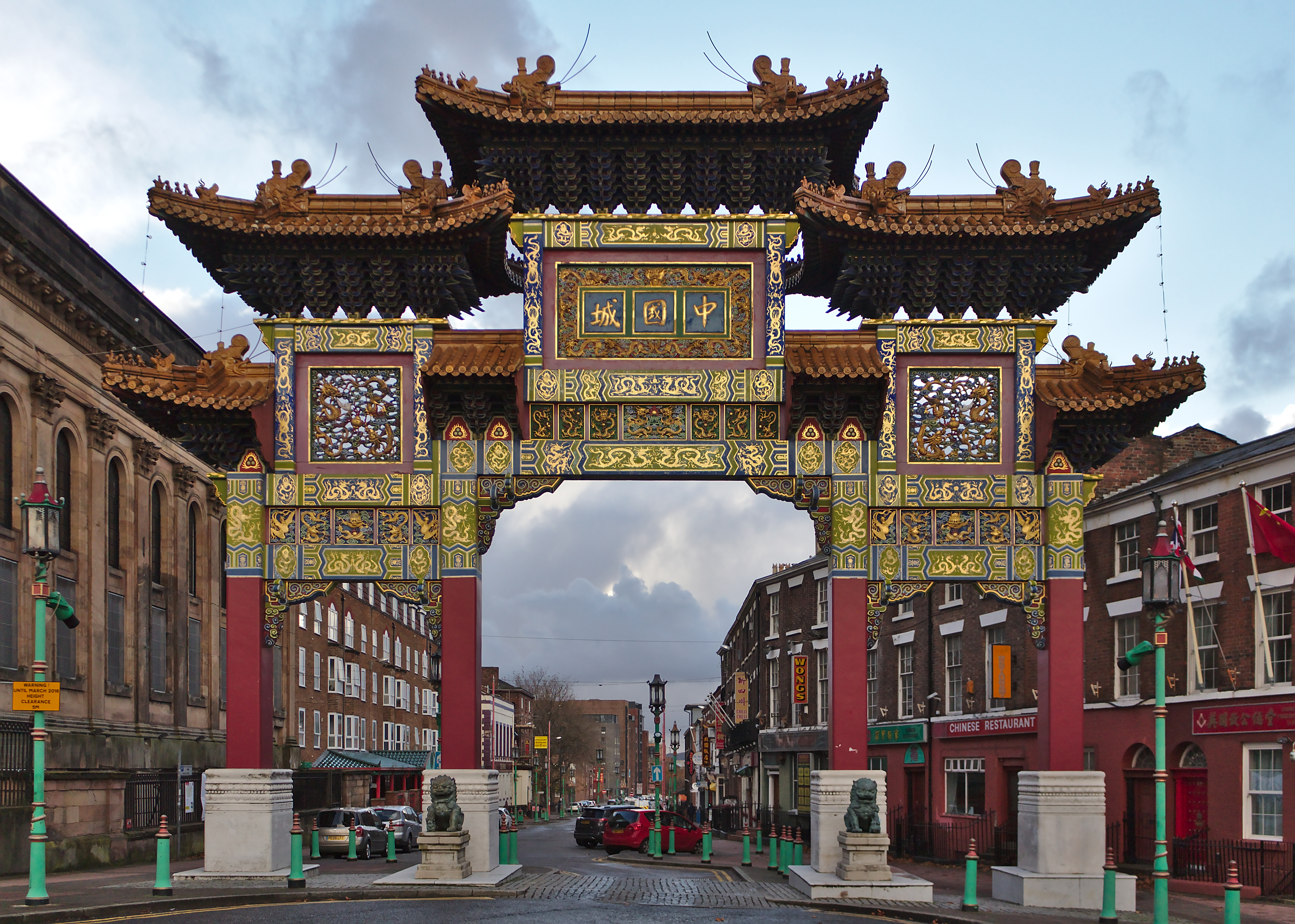
- Chinatown Gate, Nelson Street
- Metropolitan borough: Liverpool
- Metropolitan county: Merseyside
- Region: North West
- Country: England
- Sovereign state: United Kingdom
- Post town: LIVERPOOL
- Postcode district: L1
- Dialling code: 0151
- Police: Merseyside
- Fire: Merseyside
- Ambulance: North West
- UK Parliament: Liverpool Riverside

Liverpool Chinatown
- Traditional Chinese: 利物浦中國城
- Simplified Chinese: 利物浦中国城
Transcriptions
Standard Mandarin
- Hanyu Pinyin: Lìwùpǔ Zhōngguóchéng
Yue: Cantonese
- Yale Romanization: leih maht póu jūng gwok sìhng
- Jyutping: lei^{6} mat^{6} pou^{2} zung^{1} gwok^{3} sing^{4}

Alternative Chinese name
- Chinese: 利物浦唐人街
Transcriptions
Standard Mandarin
- Hanyu Pinyin: Lìwùpǔ Tángrénjiē
Yue: Cantonese
- Yale Romanization: leih maht póu tòhng yàhn gāai
- Jyutping: lei^{6} mat^{6} pou^{2} tong^{4} jan^{4} gaai^{1}

The Chinatown area of Liverpool, England, is home to the oldest Chinese community in Europe. Based in Great George ward in the south of the city centre, Chinatown has many Chinese businesses, restaurants and supermarkets, and facilities for the Chinese community. The area is home to a paifang on Nelson Street which is the tallest, multiple-span arch of its kind outside China.

== History ==
=== Establishment ===
The first presence of Chinese people in Liverpool dates back to 1834 when the first vessel direct from China arrived in Liverpool's docks to trade such goods as silk and cotton wool. Many Chinese immigrants first arrived in Liverpool in the late 1860s as a result of Alfred Holt and Company employing large numbers of Chinese seamen while establishing the Blue Funnel Shipping Line. The commercial shipping line created strong trade links between the cities of Shanghai, Hong Kong and Liverpool; mainly importing silk, cotton and tea. From the 1890s onwards, small numbers of Chinese began to set up businesses catering to the Chinese sailors working on Holt's lines and others. Some of these men married working class British women, resulting in a number of British-born Eurasian Chinese being born in Liverpool.

=== World War II ===
At the beginning of World War II, there were up to 20,000 Chinese mariners in the city. In 1942, there was a strike for rights and pay equal to that of white mariners. The strike had lasted for four months. For the duration of the War these men were labelled as "troublemakers" by the shipowners and the British Government. At the end of the conflict, they were forbidden shore jobs, their pay was cut by two-thirds and they were offered only one-way voyages back to China. Hundreds of men were forced to leave their families, with many of their locally born children continuing to live in and around Liverpool's Chinatown to this day.

Liverpool's first Chinatown existed within the city's docklands, although bombing during World War II led to a relocation to the current spot just west of Liverpool Cathedral.

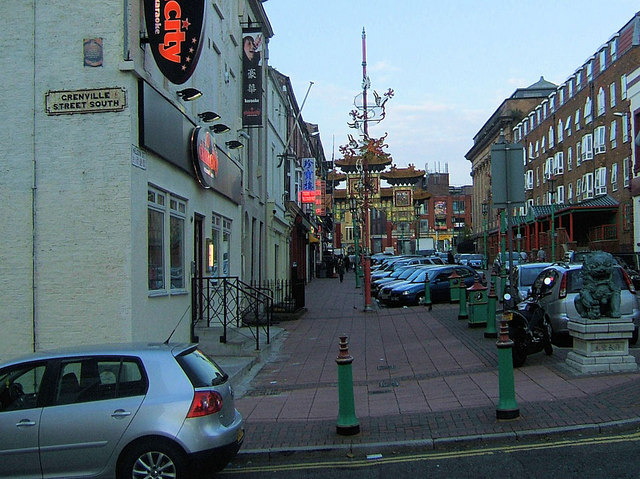
Chinatown, Liverpool City Centre

=== Regeneration ===
The Chinese Arch was built in Shanghai and installed in Liverpool in 2000.

There have been several plans to redevelop Chinatown. One scheme named 'China Square' was set to include a Chinese Cultural Museum and Courtyard by Marriott in the former Scandinavian Hotel building. Another planned regeneration project was 'Shanghai Square', which would occupy the southern fringes of Chinatown.

== Geography ==
The Chinatown in Liverpool, England is located near the city centre's southern edge close to Liverpool Cathedral. The city's Chinatown district has spread significantly since its first establishment, now taking up much of Berry Street. The streets of Liverpool's Chinatown are decorated with Chinese-style lanterns, waste bins and all street signs are written in English and Chinese.

=== Street names ===
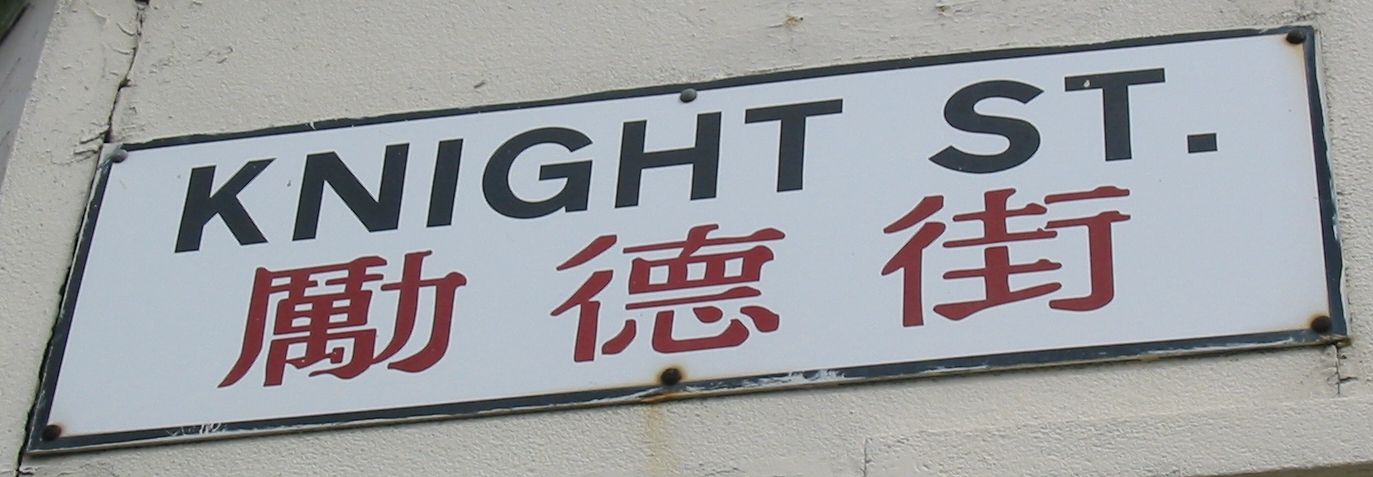
Knight Street's bilingual street sign

English name	Chinese name		Romanisation	
English name	Simplified	Traditional	Mandarin (Pinyin)	Cantonese (Jyutping)
Bailey Street	贝利街	貝利街	Bèilì Jiē	bui^{3} lei^{6} gaai^{1}
Berry Street	巴利街	巴利街	Bālì Jiē	baa^{1} lei^{6} gaai^{1}
Cornwallis Street	康和利士街	康和利士街	Kānghélìshì Jiē	hong^{1} wo^{4} lei^{6} si^{6} gaai^{1}
Cummings Street	卡明斯街	卡明斯街	Kǎmíngsī Jiē	kaa^{1} ming^{4} si^{1} gaai^{1}
Duke Street	公爵街	公爵街	Gōngjué Jiē	gung^{1} zoek^{3} gaai^{1}
Griffiths Street	居富士街	居富士街	Jūfùshì Jiē	geoi^{1} fu^{3} si^{6} gaai^{1}
Knight Street	励德街	勵德街	Lìdé Jiē	lai^{6} dak^{1} gaai^{1}
Nelson Street	纳尔逊街	納爾遜街	Nà'ěrxùn Jiē	naap^{6} ji^{6} seon^{3} gaai^{1}
Roscoe Lane	罗士高里	羅士高里	Luóshìgāo Lǐ	lo^{4} si^{6} gou^{1} lei^{5}
Sankey Street	桑基街	桑基街	Sāngjī Jiē	song^{1} gei^{1} gaai^{1}
Seel Street	兆街	兆街	Zhào Jiē	siu^{6} gaai^{1}
Upper Duke Street	上公爵街	上公爵街	Shàng Gōngjué Jiē	soeng^{6} gung^{1} zoek^{3} gaai^{1}

== Demography ==
2007 estimates state 1.7% of Liverpool's population as being of full Chinese descent (some 7,400 people), making it the city's single largest non-White ethnic group. The International Organization for Migration, by contrast, has estimated that the number of Chinese people in Liverpool could range between 25,000 and 35,000. There is also a large number of Chinese Liverpudlians of mixed European and Chinese ethnicity, descendants of the earlier generations of Chinese settlers in the city.

Liverpool's universities also host a large number of Chinese students, with the University of Liverpool having the largest number of Chinese students of any university in the UK.

== Economy ==
Chinese owned restaurants, supermarkets (including Chung Wah and Hondo), book shops and other businesses are now spread throughout the district. The large and increasing Chinese student population has seen the growth of a new network of businesses catering to the needs of Mainland Chinese students, building upon the existing Chinatown in the city.

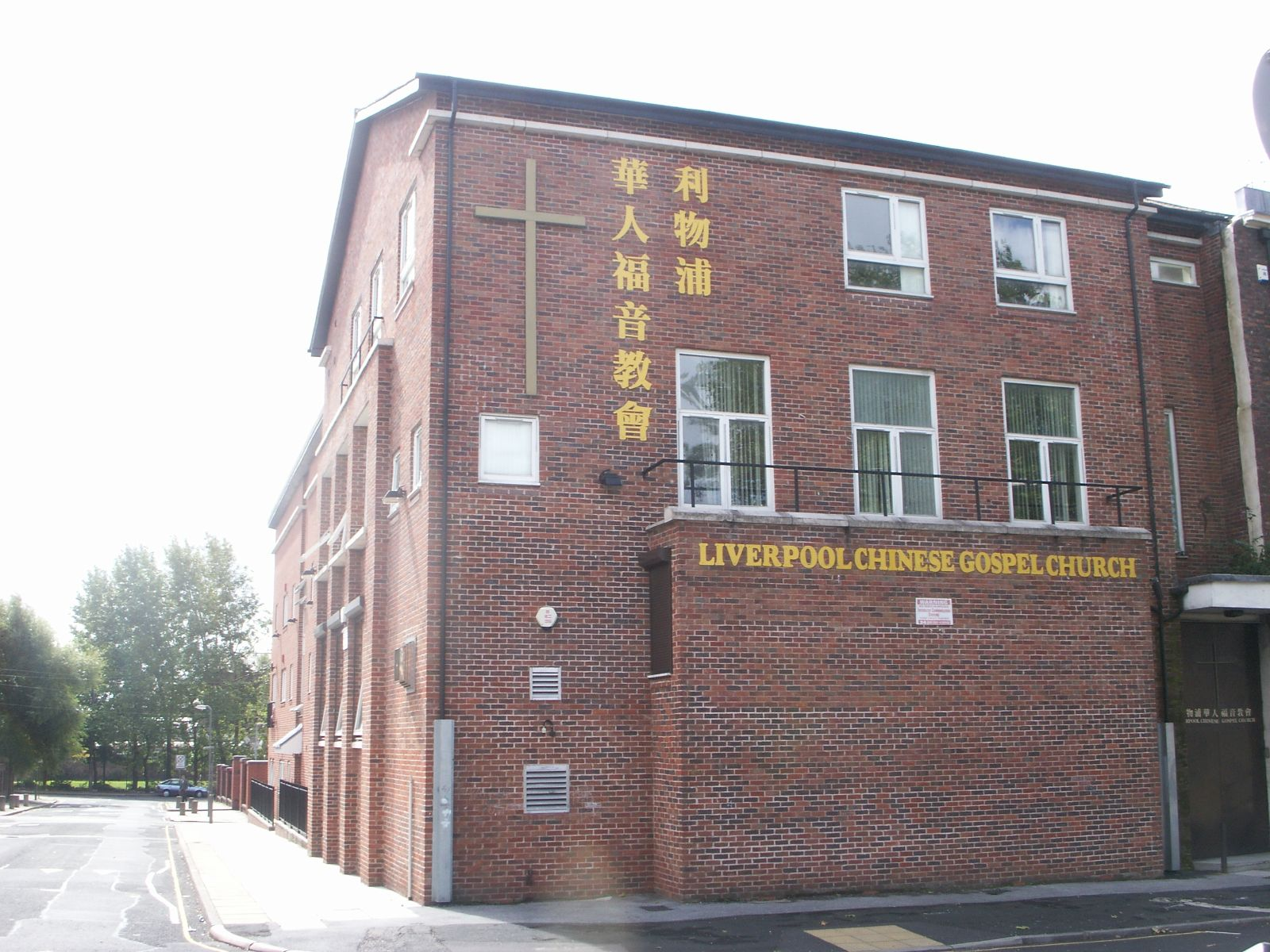
Chinese Gospel Church

== Culture and community ==
=== Facilities ===
Chinatown is also home to many community organisations as well as the Liverpool Chinese Gospel Church and the Liverpool Chinese Christian Disciples Church.

== Landmarks ==
=== Chinese arch ===
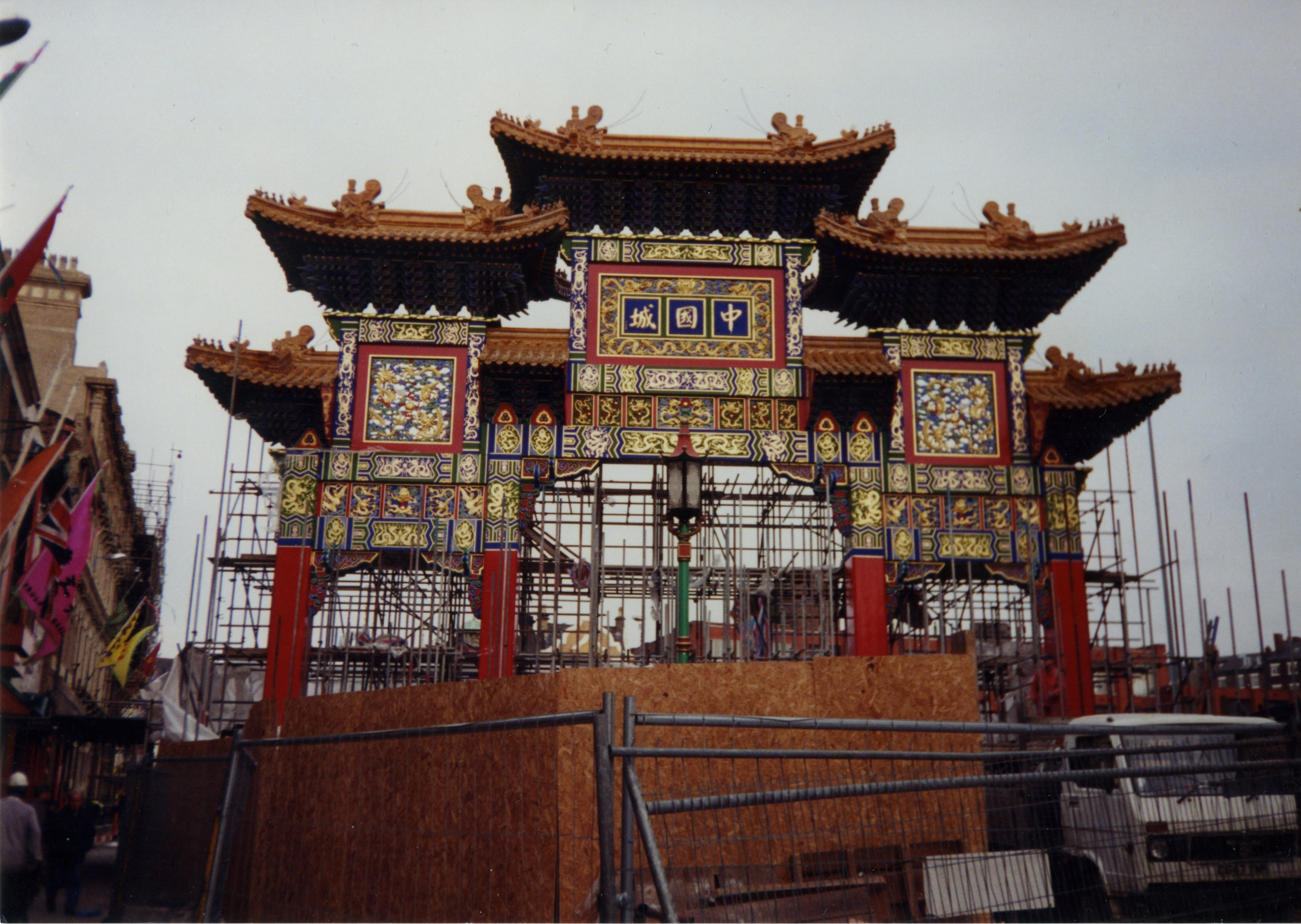
Chinatown Arch in 2000 during the last stage of construction

Planning for an arch began in 1992 as part of a regeneration scheme by Liverpool City Council for the Chinatown area. Designs for the arch were chosen by the local Chinese community through a competition.

Initial construction began in October 1999 as part of the Ropewalks Phase 1 regeneration, with Dowhigh Civil Engineering of Bootle, Liverpool being announced as principal contractor and the arrival of 20 specially selected craftmen from Liverpool's twin city of Shanghai. The craftsmen included stonemasons, stone carvers, painters and construction engineers. Along with the Chinese workers, block components manufactured by The Shanghai Linyi Garden Company Ltd were also shipped from China to Liverpool in five large containers with 2,000 pieces. Overall design was co-ordinated through the architectural practice of Wilkinson Hindle Hallsall and Lloyd with Liverpool City Council providing engineering design and supervision of the infrastructure and structural frame to the arch. Work finished in a relatively short time period of 90 days. This was due to the Chinese workers not traditionally celebrating Christmas and Boxing Day meaning that they could carry on working. Building of the arch finished in 2000 and was officially opened on Chinese New Year at a final cost of £700,000.

Standing at 13.5 metres (44 ft) high the arch is the tallest in Europe and the second tallest in any Chinatown outside mainland China. (Washington D.C. having the tallest outside China at 14 m or 47 ft.) The arch boasts 200 hand carved dragons of which 188 are ordinary and 12 are pregnant, the meaning of which is to symbolise good fortune between Liverpool and Shanghai. The word "Chinatown" (trad. Chinese: 中國城; pinyin: zhōngguóchéng) is written on the centre of the arch from right-to-left using traditional Chinese characters. In 2010 as part of a £25,000 lighting scheme, multicoloured, low energy illuminating lights were added to the arch as a way to highlight one of Liverpool's significant structures.

== See also ==
- List of Chinatowns
