= MS Antenor (1956) =

1956–1983 British cargo ship

History
- Name: Antenor (1956-1970); Glenlochy (1970-1972); Dymas (1972-1973); Kaiyun (1973-1983)
- Operator: Ocean Steam Ship Company (1956-1970, 1972-1973); Glen Line (1970-1972); Nan Yang Shipping Company, Macau (1973-1976); Highseas Navigation Corporation S.A., China (1976-1983)
- Builder: Vickers-Armstrongs Naval Yard, High Walker, Tyneside
- Yard number: 152
- Launched: 4 October 1956
- Completed: July 1957
- In service: 1957
- Out of service: 1983
- Fate: Broken up at Huangpu, 1983

General characteristics
- Class & type: Mark A6 class cargo ship
- Tonnage: 7,965 GRT; 4,276 NT
- Length: 491 ft 6 in (149.81 m) o/a; 452 ft 9 in (138.00 m) p/p
- Beam: 62 ft 5 in (19.02 m)
- Depth: 35 ft 2 in (10.72 m)
- Propulsion: 1 × 8,000 bhp (5,966 kW) Kincaid 6-cylinder diesel engine, single screw
- Speed: 15 knots (28 km/h; 17 mph)
- Capacity: 12 passenger cabins

MS Antenor was a British cargo ship, and the fourth of five ships to bear the name. She was built in 1956–57 at the Vickers-Armstrongs Naval Yard, at High Walker, Newcastle upon Tyne, for Alfred Holt and Company, who owned various shipping lines including the Ocean Steam Ship Company (OSSC) and Blue Funnel Line.

MS Antenor had a gross registered tonnage (GRT) of 7,965 tons, was 452 feet 9 inches (138.00 m) long, had a beam of 62 feet 4 inches (19.00 m) and a service speed of 15 knots (28 km/h). She was powered by an 8,000 bhp (5,966 kW) 6-cylinder diesel engine by Kincaid powering a single screw. She had 12 passenger cabins. She was launched on 4 October 1956 and completed in July 1957.

She was the first of a series of three Mark A6 ships. Her sister ships were MS Dolius (1956) and MS Achilles (1957). She sailed from 1957 to 1970 for the Ocean Steam Ship Company. In November 1970 she transferred to Glen Line and was renamed MS Glenlochy. She was transferred back to Blue Funnel in June 1972, and renamed MS Dymas. She was the second ship to bear this name. From June 1972 - April 1973 she sailed again for the Ocean Steam Ship Company.

In April 1973 she was sold to Nan Yang Shipping Company of Macau and renamed Kaiyun. She was sold again in 1976 to Highseas Navigation Corporation S.A. of China, registered in Panama under the same name. She was finally broken at Huangpu, China in 1983.
