= Ocean Group plc =

Former British transport company

Ocean Group
- Industry: Transport
- Founded: 1865
- Defunct: 2000
- Fate: Merged with NFC plc
- Successor: Exel plc
- Headquarters: London, England

Ocean Group plc was a major British transport business. It was listed on the London Stock Exchange and was a constituent of the FTSE 250 Index.

== History ==
The company was founded by Alfred Holt and Philip Holt, as the Ocean Steamship Company, to provide a steamship service known as the Blue Funnel Line, between the United Kingdom and China. It was generally known as Holts and had a trademark blue funnel on its ships. For many years it used Swire Group as it shipping agents. In 1947, it formed Malayan Airways.

It was first listed on the London Stock Exchange in 1965.

In 1969, it joined forces with British & Commonwealth Holdings, Furness Withy, and P&O to form Overseas Containers Limited to exploit the introduction of containerization.

In 1972, it acquired William Cory, a major shipping agent, and the following year, it changed its name to Ocean Transport & Trading.

In 1986, it withdrew Overseas Containers Limited and in 1990 it renamed itself Ocean Group.

In 2000, it merged with NFC plc to form Exel plc.

== Operations ==
A major restructuring exercise occurred in 1967 whereby all of the Ocean Steam Ship Company's fleet operations were divided amongst four companies, each of which answered to the main board of the Ocean Steam Ship Company. The four fleet operating companies were:

- Blue Funnel Line
- Elder Dempster
- Glen Line
- Nederlandsche Stoomvaart Maatschappij Oceaan

=== Subsidiaries and subsequent acquisitions ===
- Seaway Car Transporters Limited were a wholly owned subsidiary of Elder Dempster
- Guinea Gulf Line – formerly the John Holt Line – was acquired by Elder Dempster in 1965
- Palm Line was acquired in 1984
