= Blue Funnel Line =

British transport company

Alfred Holt and Company (Blue Funnel Line)
- House flag
- Type: Subsidiary of the Ocean Steam Ship Company
- Industry: Shipping, transportation
- Founded: 16 January 1866
- Founder: Alfred Holt
- Defunct: 1988
- Fate: Bankruptcy; assets sold
- Successor: Ocean Group plc
- Headquarters: United Kingdom
- Area served: global
- Key people: Victoria Drummond (Engineer)
- Parent: Ocean Steam Ship Company
- Subsidiaries: Nederlandsche Stoomvaart Maatschappij Oceaan; East India Ocean Steam Ship Company; China Mutual Steam Navigation Company

Alfred Holt and Company, trading as Blue Funnel Line, was a UK shipping company that was founded in 1866 and operated merchant ships for 122 years. It was one of the UK's larger shipowning and operating companies, and as such had a significant role in the country's overseas trade and in the First and Second World Wars.

== History ==
=== Foundation and expansion ===
Alfred Holt founded the business on 16 January 1866. The main operating subsidiary was the Ocean Steam Ship Company, which owned and operated the majority of the company's vessels.

A Dutch subsidiary, the Nederlandsche Stoomvaart Maatschappij Oceaan, was founded in 1891, as was the East India Ocean Steam Ship Company, operated from Singapore. This latter was sold in 1899 to Norddeutscher Lloyd. The company acquired the competing China Mutual Steam Navigation Company in 1902, keeping it as a subsidiary company but operating it as part of Blue Funnel Line. The company's ships connected the major ports of Shanghai and Hong Kong to Liverpool. The ship's crews were Chinese as well as European. As a consequence, some Chinese seamen settled in Liverpool from the 1860s to found the oldest Chinese community in Europe.

Ships of the Blue Funnel fleet all had names from classical Greek legend or history. The majority were cargo ships, but most of the Ocean SS Co cargo ships also had capacity for a few passengers. The line also had a small number of purely passenger vessels.

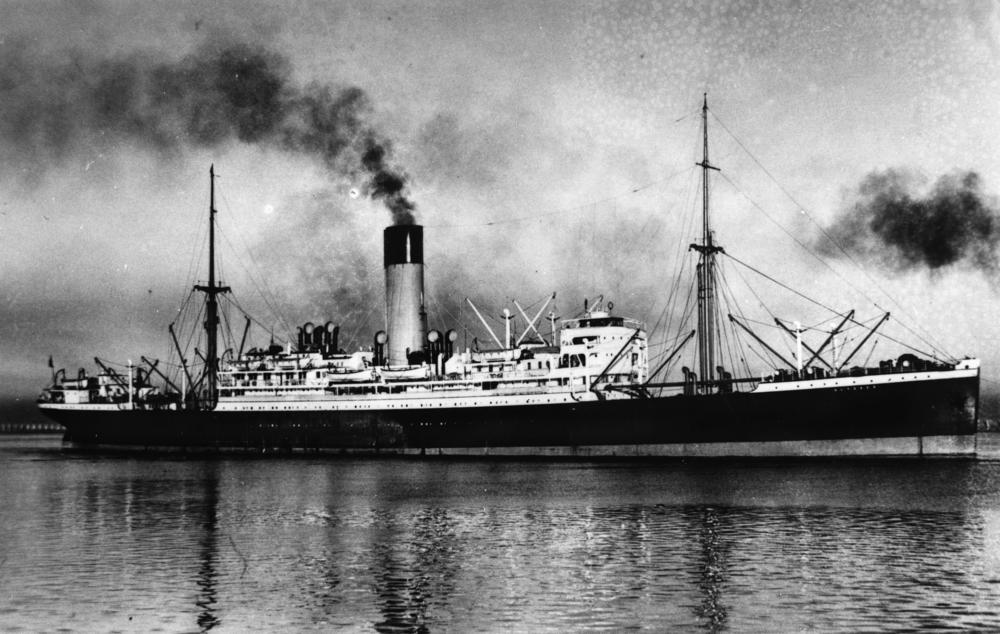
14,499 GRT passenger liner Ulysses. U-160 sank her in 1942 but all 290 people aboard survived.

Nestor, launched 7 December 1912, and Ulysses, launched 5 July 1913, are examples of large cargo/passenger vessels entering the line's service at the time. Both ships were built in Belfast by Workman, Clark and Company with a length of 580 ft (176.8 m) and 14,500 gross tons. Passenger accommodations were for first class only and seven cargo holds, one and a 'tween decks space fitted for refrigerated meat, dairy and fruit cargoes, provided accommodation of the largest consignments.

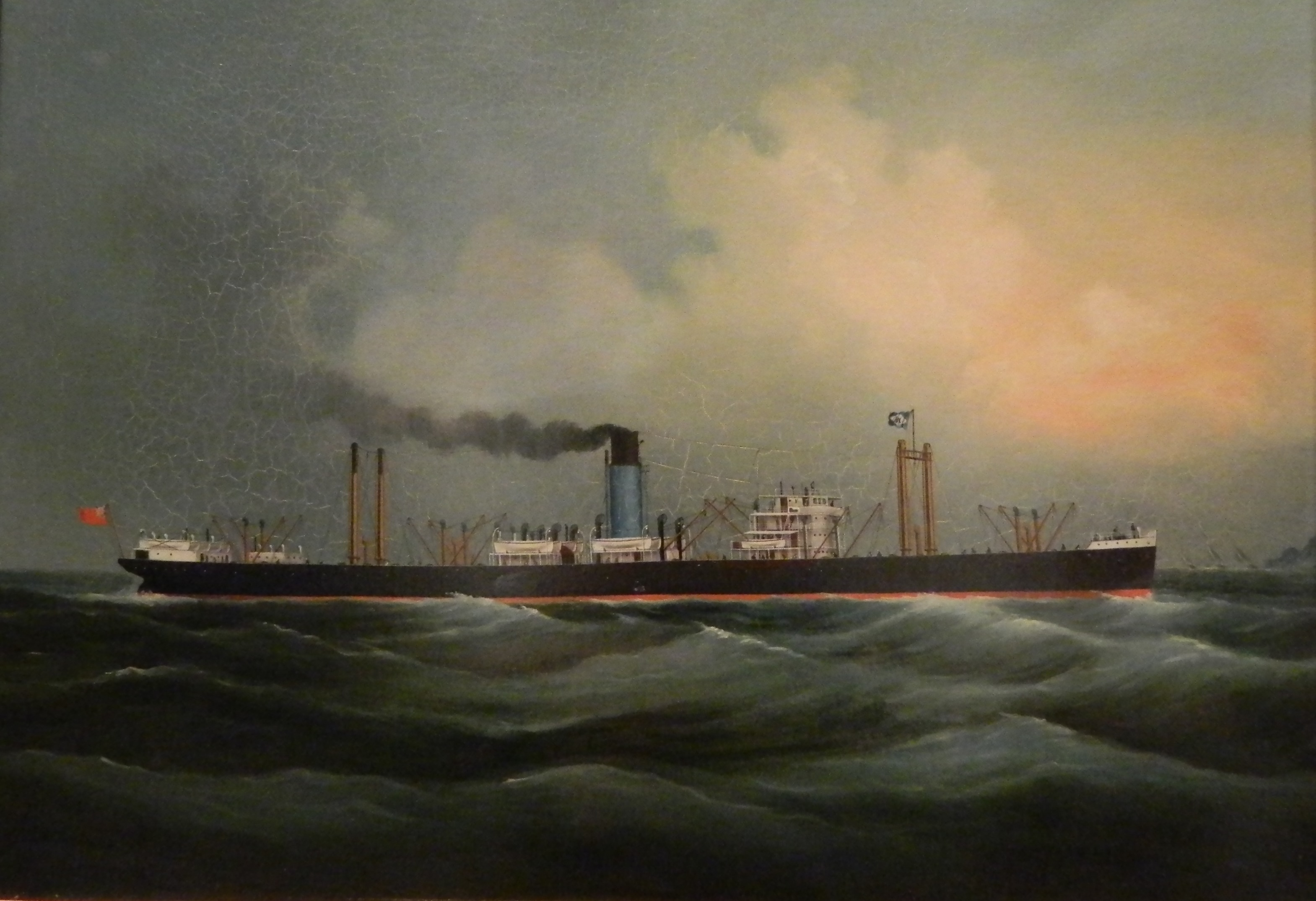
Painting of the 9,076 GRT Cyclops approaching Hong Kong. U-123 sank her in 1942 with the loss of 87 lives. The painting is in the Museum of Liverpool; the artist is unknown.

In the 1920s, Blue Funnel became the first British shipping company to employ a woman marine engineer. Victoria Drummond served with the company three times: firstly as Tenth Engineer on the liner Anchises 1922–24, then as refrigeration engineer on the refrigerated cargo ship Perseus in 1943 and finally as resident engineer at Caledon Shipbuilding in Dundee supervising the completion of Rhexenor and Stentor in 1946. These were two of the first new ships built for Blue Funnel to replace its Second World War losses.

The company expanded in 1937 through acquisition of the Glen Line in 1935, that provided cargo and passenger service to the Far East from eastern English ports such as London. The overall managing director, C. E. Wurtzburg, brought Herbert Gladstone McDavid to London from the company's Liverpool office as director of the new acquisition and profits increased. Eight new Glenearn class ships were ordered, four from UK shipyards and four from abroad but not all were delivered when the Second World War started.

=== Outward Bound ===
The first Outward Bound school was opened in Aberdyfi, Wales in 1941 with the support of the Blue Funnel Line. Outward Bound's founding mission was to improve the survival chances of young seamen after their ships were torpedoed in the mid-Atlantic.

Captain JF "Freddy" Fuller of the Blue Funnel Line took over the leadership of the Aberdyfi school in 1942 and served the Outward Bound movement as senior warden until 1971. Fuller was seconded following wartime experience during the Battle of the Atlantic of surviving two successive U-boat attacks and commanding an open lifeboat in the Atlantic Ocean for 35 days without losing a single member of the crew.

=== After the World Wars ===
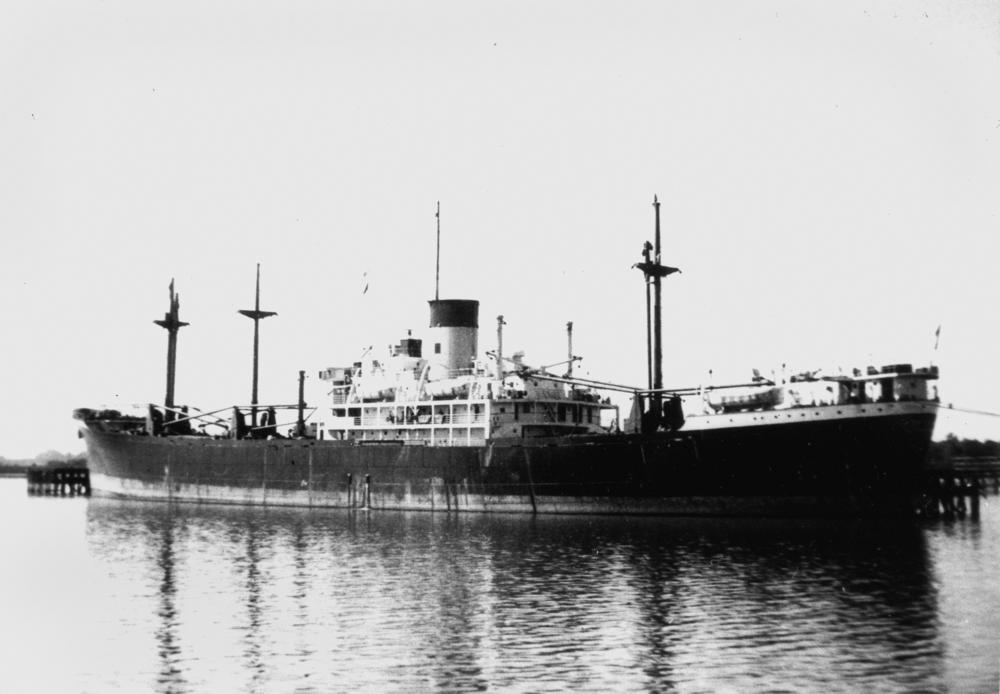
10,198 GRT cargo ship Rhexenor in 1953

Blue Funnel lost 16 ships in the First World War and 30 in the Second. After each war it restored its fleet with new ships. After the Second War it regained tonnage rapidly by buying six Victory ships from the United States Maritime Commission in 1946 and eight "Sam-" ships from the Ministry of War Transport in 1947. Six of the eight new ships ordered by Glen Line in 1938 were reacquired, resulting in a fleet of 15 ships by September 1948. The twice-monthly fast service and a slower secondary service to the Far East resumed.

Two Blue Funnel ships, Agapenor and Melampus were trapped by the Six-Day War of 1967 and became part of the Yellow Fleet in the Great Bitter Lake, remaining there until 1975.

=== Decline ===
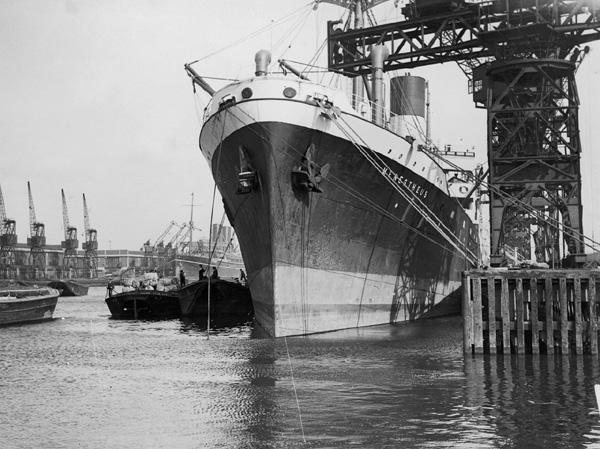
7,494 GRT cargo ship Menestheus in King George V Dock, London

From 1947 to 1970, as Britain's empire began to shrink, so did its trade. Simultaneously, companies from other parts of the world began to operate more competitively. Cabotage regulations prevented British flag companies from trading on routes that were previously their monopolies. Several factors resulted in a decreased number in the Blue Funnel's fleet. Among the more notable of officers to work at Blue Funnel line was Richard Woodman who began his seagoing career as an apprentice with the line in 1960.

The company finally came to an end in 1988 when Ocean Group withdrew from the Barber Blue Sea Service, its last shipping line.

== Legacy ==
The Merseyside Maritime Museum Archive and Library holds the company archive.

The company's seafarers later went to fill various roles in the British maritime shore based establishment, including Malcolm Maclachlan, a lecturer in Glasgow and a popular author of books on maritime business.

== See also ==
- SS Automedon
- SS Cyclops (1906)

== Bibliography ==
- Cook, Ian (2010). Those in Peril: A Blue Funnel Story: a Fifty-six-year Love Affair with Ships. Christchurch: Willsonscott Publishing. ISBN 9781877427312.
- Drummond, Cherry (1994). The Remarkable Life of Victoria Drummond – Marine Engineer. London: Institute of Marine Engineers. ISBN 0-907206-54-9.
- Falkus, Malcolm (1990). The Blue Funnel Legend: A History Of The Ocean Steam Ship Company, 1865-1973. London: Macmillan. ISBN 978-0333522837.
- James, David (1957). Outward Bound. London: Routledge and Kegan Paul.
- Le Fleming, HM (1961). Ships of the Blue Funnel Line. Southampton: Adlard Coles Ltd.
- Malcolm, Ian M (2013a). Outward Bound: Blue Funnel Line (British – post WW2). Merchant Navy Series. Vol. Book 1. Dundee: Moira Brown.
- Malcolm, Ian (2013b). Via Suez (British): Blue Funnel Line. Merchant Navy Series. Vol. Book 3. Liverpool: Moira Brown.
- Miner, Joshua L; Boldt, Joe (2002). Outward Bound USA: Crew Not Passengers (Revised ed.). Seattle: Mountaineers Books. ISBN 978-0-89886-874-6.
- Priest, Simon; Gass, Michael (2017). Effective Leadership in Adventure Programming (3rd ed.). Champaign: Human Kinetics. ISBN 978-1492547860.
- Talbot-Booth, EC (1942) [1936]. Ships and the Sea (Seventh ed.). London: Sampson Low, Marston & Co Ltd. pp. 486–487.

== Links ==
- The Blue Funnel Line 1866 - 1986 (archived)
- Alfred Holt & Co The Blue Funnel Line (archived)
- kbolton.btinternet.co.uk
- "The Blue Funnel Line To Australia - 1913". GG Archives. – 1913 brochure for Nestor and Ulysses, with period interior photographs
