= British-Islamic Identity =

2015 book by Aminul Hoque

British-Islamic Identity: Third-generation Bangladeshis from East London
- Author: Aminul Hoque
- Language: English
- Subject: Sociology
- Genre: Non-fiction
- Publisher: Trentham Books
- Publication date: 27 February 2015
- Publication place: United Kingdom
- Media type: Print
- Pages: 176
- ISBN: 978-1-85856-603-0

British-Islamic Identity: Third-generation Bangladeshis from East London is a 2015 book written by Aminul Hoque.

== Overview ==
The book shows how six British-born Muslim teenagers have created their own "British-Islamic identity", with stories charting their life experiences. The interviewees are all third-generation Bangladeshis living in Tower Hamlets, the London borough that is home to the largest concentration of Bangladeshis outside Bangladesh.

The book explores how that identity helps Bangladeshis born in the East End manage the complexities of being British, Bangladeshi and Muslim, with a sense of belonging, despite Islamic terrorism dominating world news.

== Critical response ==
Mafruha Mohua of Times Higher Education said of British-Islamic Identity, "Hoque's examination of the strategies this generation employs in constructing British-Islamic identity is intriguing." Nike Brooke of East London Advertiser said "...Hoque delves into how it feels to be seen as 'violent, terrorist, un-British' and be in a marginalised minority with 'no sense of belonging'".

IOE Press said, "The book tackles the layers of sociological postmodern identity – language, race, religion, nation and gender – and frames them within the context of young people's self-narratives. It offers important new insight and understanding of their own stories of identity and allows us to hear these ignored and alienated voices."

== See also ==
- Cultural identity
- Islam in the United Kingdom
- British Bangladeshi
- List of British Bangladeshis
