= Foysol Choudhury =

Bangladeshi-born British businessman (born 1969)

Foysol Choudhury MBE
- ফয়ছল হোসেন চৌধূরী
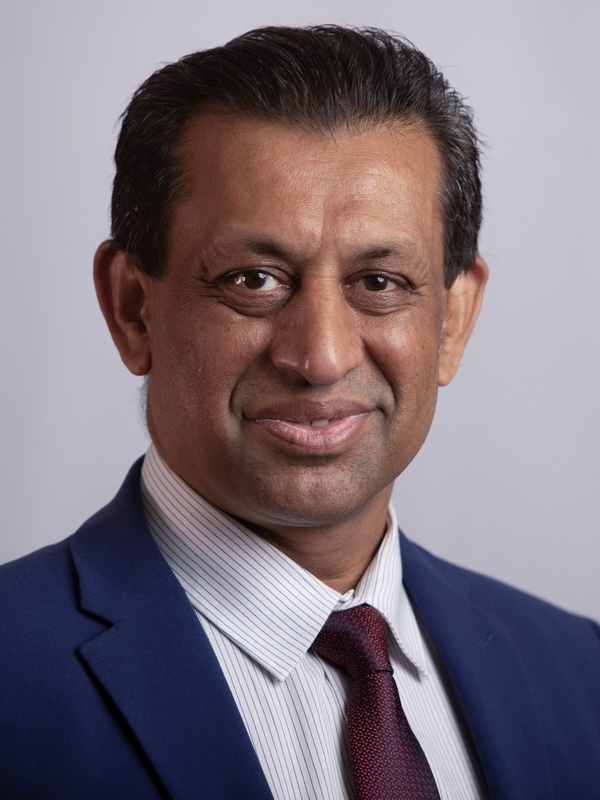
- Official portrait, 2021

Member of the Scottish Parliament for Lothian (1 of 7 Regional MSPs)
- In office 5 May 2021 – 9 April 2026

Personal details
- Born: Foysol Hussain Choudhury; 5 January 1969 (age 57) Nabiganj Upazila, East Pakistan
- Party: Independent
- Other political affiliations: Scottish Labour (until 2025, suspended)

Foysol Hussain Choudhury, MBE (Bengali: ফয়ছল হোসেন চৌধূরী; born 5 January 1969) is a Bangladeshi-born British businessman, and an Independent politician. He has been a Member of the Scottish Parliament (MSP) for the Lothian region since May 2021. He was a member of Scottish Labour until his suspension in 2025.

Choudhury is Chairman of the Edinburgh and Lothians Regional Equality Council. He was one of the founding directors and the Vice Chair of the Edinburgh Mela. He is also Chairman of the Bangladesh Samity Edinburgh.

== Early life & family ==
Choudhury was born on 5 January 1969 to the Bengali Muslim Choudhury family in Nabiganj Upazila, East Pakistan (now modern day Bangladesh).

He is the eldest son of the late Al‐Haj Gulam Rabbani Choudhury and Rukeya Rabbani Choudhury, with six siblings.

His family first moved from Bangladesh in 1972 to Manchester, England. They later came and settled in Edinburgh, Scotland in 1981.

Choudhury's uncle is businessman Wali Tasar Uddin.

== Professional career ==
During his time studying at the University of Edinburgh, Choudhury took responsibility for his ailing father's business. He expanded the business and is now an entrepreneur with interests in catering, hospitality, finance and real estate across the United Kingdom and Bangladesh.

Foysol is a prominent community activist in the UK, known for his leadership and commitment to improving social justice. He has worked with the Scottish Government and various councils to improve community relations. He has played a leading role in several charities.

He has been involved with the Edinburgh and Lothian’s Regional Equality Council (ELREC) since he was a teenager and has been an active campaigner for equality, good race and inter‐faith relations in Scotland. He has served ELREC in different capacities, as a Trustee, Company Secretary, Vice‐Chair and he currently holds the post of Chair. Choudhury has led the organisation through its transition from the race equality council to a pan-equalities regional council. In 2013, he was re-elected for a fourth term.

In 1997, Choudhury co-founded the Edinburgh Mela and is currently its vice-chair. Additionally, he is the Chairman of the Bangladesh Samity Edinburgh (Bangladesh Association Edinburgh), organising events to celebrate Bangladeshi culture and heritage. Choudhury is the General Secretary of the Guild of Bangladeshi Restaurateurs of Scotland and as one of the founding members of Dine Bangladeshi Campaign.

== Political career ==
At the snap 2017 general election, Choudhury was selected as the official Labour Party candidate for the Edinburgh South West constituency. However, he was not elected and lost in 3rd place.

He was elected at 2021 Scottish Parliament election for the Lothian region, becoming the first MSP of Bangladeshi background to be elected. Within the Scottish Parliament, Choudhury serves as Deputy Party Spokesperson on Culture, Europe, and International Development for Scottish Labour.

In the Chamber, Choudhury has raised parliamentary questions on various topics, including housing, healthcare, climate justice, Scottish education, racism, and refugee support. He backed the UK Government’s decision to introduce means-testing for the Winter Fuel Payment, voting in the Scottish Parliament against calls to reverse the decision.

== Controversies ==
On 11 June 2019, an employment tribunal, brought by former Edinburgh Mela director Chris Purnell, found that evidence given by Mr Choudhury and former City of Edinburgh Labour Councillor Shami Khan was unsatisfactory. The tribunal said Mr Purnell had given his evidence "in a straightforward and measured way" and it was "entirely credible". It added: "In contrast, the manner in which Mr Khan and Mr Choudhury gave their evidence was often unsatisfactory. Both showed a reluctance to answer simple questions directly."

The tribunal awarded Mr Purnell £67,000 after it found he was unfairly dismissed from his role of director of the Mela festival, of which Mr Choudhury was vice-chair. Mr Purnell alleged that Mr Choudhury told him he should "watch himself" and "remember who pays his wages". And he said Mr Choudhury also criticised his body language and told him "directors come and go" and that he should not be taking credit for the success of the Mela and "acting as if he was doing the board a favour".

On 27 September 2025, Choudhury was suspended by the Labour Party over an inappropriate conduct claim; it as confirmed he would sit as an independent MSP while the investigation is carried out. In December, Choudhury, who had originally been reselected for the 2026 Scottish Parliament election, was excluded from Labour's list of candidates after selections reopened.

== Awards and recognition ==
In 2004, in recognition of his services to the community, Choudhury was appointed a Member of the Order of the British Empire (MBE) in the 2004 New Year Honours for his services to the community. He has also been involved in various charitable activities, including fundraising for disaster relief efforts in Bangladesh and supporting local charities in Scotland. He received the Open All Hours Award in 2023 from the Holyrood Political Awards.

== Personal life ==
Choudhury is married to Mirza Tahmina Mahbub (Moni) from Moulvibazar, Bangladesh. They have two children, a son and daughter.

He is involved in fundraising campaigns, raising over £250,000 for causes including Bangladesh Cyclone Appeal in Scotland, St Columba's Hospice, Leukaemia and Cancer appeal, Sick Kids appeal, the British Heart Foundation and others. In addition to this he is also one of the organisers who built two shelters and 40 houses for the survivors of Cyclone Sidr Bangladesh in 2010.

== See also ==
- British Bangladeshis
- List of British Bangladeshis
