= Spice Business Magazine =

British trade magazine

- Cover in January and February 2013
- Enam Ali: Enam Ali; Clive Woodbridge; Gulam Murtaza Faruk
- Staff writers: Justine Ali
- Photographer: Steve Bishop
- Categories: Business
- Frequency: Quarterly
- Circulation: 14,500
- Publisher: Enam Ali
- Founder: Enam Ali
- Founded: September 1998
- First issue: September 1998
- Country: United Kingdom
- Based in: Epsom, Surrey
- Language: English
- Website: www.spicebusiness.co.uk

Spice Business Magazine is a British quarterly trade magazine for the Indian restaurant business community.

== Content ==
In 1998, Spice Business Magazine was launched. It features articles about UK food manufacturers, food and drinks distributors, doctor surgeries, dentists, jewellery shops, travel agents, Asian entrepreneurs, cash and carries, halal groceries, wholesalers, and Indian restaurants - as well as prominent figures within the business community.

The magazine was set by British Bangladeshi Enam Ali to tackle the problems of the curry industry in the UK. In the beginning, the 42-page magazine was sold at 2 pounds.

== See also ==
- Business of British Bangladeshis
