= First Solution Money Transfer =

UK business

- Type: Private
- Industry: Foreign exchange market
- Founded: 2004
- Defunct: Yes
- Headquarters: London, England
- Number of locations: 41 branches
- Key people: Dr Fazal Mahmoud (Chairman); Gulam Rabbani Rumi (Director); Shah Mohammad Abdul Hadi (Director)
- Products: Clothing
- Revenue: £87 million (before collapse)
- Owner: Mamun Chowdhury; Rob Huson
- Number of employees: Over 100 agents
- Website: first-solution.co.uk

First Solution Money Transfer was a UK-based private limited company which provided a money transfer service, providing expatriates the facilities to transfer money back to their family in Bangladesh.

In June 2007, the company went into liquidation owing nearly GB£2 Million pounds to the public, the majority of whom were from the Sylhet region of Bangladesh.

Campaigns organised by various community leaders and the local Member of Parliament have led to investigations of the collapse by the Metropolitan Police and a review of this industry by the government. Tighter regulation in this sector were expected to be introduced by 2009. The government has also indicated support for the setup of a crisis fund to compensate the victims.

== History ==
According to the records available at Companies House, First Solution Money Transfer was set up as a Limited Company with a share capital of GB£100 on 14 April 2004. Of these 35 shares were held by Dr. Fazal Mahmood, 35 by Mr Ghulam Rabbani, 25 by Shah Mohammed Abdul Hadi, and 5 by Mohammed Nazrul. All four were named as directors of the company, and Ghulam Robbani as the company secretary. A further 40,000 shares of GB£1 each were issued during the 2005-06 accounting year, but the documents give no indication as to how or to whom the shares were distributed.

In presenting its accounts to Companies House, First Solution presented abbreviated accounts in accordance with the Financial Reporting Standard for Smaller Entities; these standards also obviated the need for the company to provide a cash flow statement to the authorities. As a result, the data available from Companies House about First Solution's business activities are remarkably skimpy.

As the figures are presented, the most substantial item in First Solution Money Transfer's accounts is an interest-free loan which the company had made to First Solution UK Ltd, and of which Dr. Fazal Mahmood and Mr Ghulam Rabbani were also directors. This loan amounted to GB£24,834 in 2005, and had risen to GB£190,697 in 2006. The documents also show that the directors paid themselves GB£9,600 in 2004–05, and a similar amount the following year, during which independent auditors were also paid GB£5,000 for their services.

In keeping with the company's presentation of itself as a small business, the directors concluded, and the auditors concurred, that there was no need to include any details of the funds which the Company transferred to Bangladesh on behalf of its customers. Hence the only indication of the company's success (or failure) in implementing its core business was the declaration of a small loss of GB£435 on its foreign exchange activities during 2005–06. No details of the company's activities during the following financial year are available at Companies House, since the business had by then collapsed.

== Company structure ==
First Solution Money Transfer had its headquarters at the London Muslim Centre in east London with another prominent office in Brick Lane. Additional branches and affiliated agents were dotted around the major towns and cities of the UK with a few in the rest of Europe.

The company grew from its inception in July 2004, increasing turnover from 4 million GBP to approximately 87 million GBP year ending 2007

== Liquidation ==
The company went into liquidation in June 2007 owing, according to the company directors, GB£1.7 million pounds to the public who had used its money transfer service in the preceding 2–3 months.

The scandal sent shockwaves through the Bangladesh money transfer industry in the UK. Measures are being put in place by the Government of Bangladesh to ensure a similar situation does not occur again.

The sudden closure of former First Solution Money Transfer Ltd (now known as XTL Ltd) on 28 June 2007 was a major blow to the UK Bangladeshi community which used it to send their hard earned money to relatives in Bangladesh.

Since then, some of the former agents and branch staff of First Solution embarked on a 'corporate recovery' package to resolve this situation and reach a position whereby all remittance creditors can be paid.

The new management of First Solution, consisting of 13 former Agents and Branches, successfully acquired the First Solution brand and commenced trading in May 2008.

One of the stated goals of the new organisation was to pay back as much of the money as possible to people who had lost funds in the scandal. It is unclear how much of the money has been repaid.

The UK government was expected to bring in tighter regulation to this sector by 2009.

== Bangladesh Bank ==
The Bangladesh Bank governor stated that First Solution was not given a license by the Bangladesh Bank. However, First Solution is listed on the Bangladesh Bank's website as having agreements with a number of banks in Bangladesh through which it was permitted to remit money into the country.

However, there are also a number of companies in the UK providing remittance facilities to Bangladesh which do not have the approval of Bangladesh Bank nor are they listed in the UK section of Bangladesh Bank's inward remittance providers list.

In an article in the East London Advertiser, Dr. Roger Ballard of the Centre for Applied South Asian Studies at the University of Manchester suggests that First Solution may well have been the first fruits of efforts by the UK's Department for International Development (DFID) to replace 'informal' community-based value transfer networks with 'more reliable' formal sector initiatives. DFID made a GB£7.5 million grant to the Bank of Bangladesh to achieve just that.

But although their publicly announced reason for doing so was to provide migrants with cheaper and more reliable services, the underling subtext of such initiatives - also strongly backed by the World Bank and the US Treasury - was to prevent these 'informal' 'underground' networks being used by terrorists and drugs smugglers - even though there was little or no evidence that hawala networks were actually being used for such purposes. Most informed commentators concluded that such 'informal' networks provided migrant workers with a service which was easier to access, cheaper, swifter, and if anything even more reliable than those provided by the banks and other former sector agencies.

DFID thought otherwise. First Solution was only too ready to agree, and carefully conformed with the necessary regulatory requirements - which were all about countering Terrorist finance and Anti–money laundering. The regulations made no reference to steps to be taken to ensure financial reliability. In the past there had been no need to do so. Trust-based networks which grew out of local communities had been extremely reliable.

However, First Solution was a totally different kind of beast. It was organised by the top down, had the blessings of the Bangladesh Bank, and perhaps of DFID as well (although they have so far kept their heads well below the parapet). But First Solution was a limited company: it wasn't grounded in networks of mutual trust or coalitions of reciprocity; and as a limited company it operated on the principle of caveat emptor - buyer beware. That's the capitalist logic of formality.

== Cause of downfall ==
It is still unclear if the situation had been exacerbated as a result of media pressure causing thousands of people to demand immediate refunds effectively causing a cashflow crisis at the company and forcing it to call in liquidators. Investigation is currently ongoing to determine the full extent of the problem and whether the company was involved in fraudulent activities or undertook risky speculative business in the currency market.

In a press statement displayed on the company's website, the directors stated that Bangla TV, a UK-based Bengali language satellite TV channel, had been irresponsible in showing angry public opinion calling for the directors and their families to be "pursued" and not to rest until they were shown "naked in the street". The directors have also stated that Bangla TV had caused panic among the community by falsely stating that the company had gone bankrupt when it hadn't on 25 June 2007. The company, therefore, had no choice but to call in liquidators as the investment and cash-injection it was seeking at the time had fallen through as a direct result of these misrepresentations by Bangla TV.

In an e-mail interview given to the E-Bangladesh news site, the directors re-iterated their views on the cause of the downfall.

== Investigation ==
An investigation has been initiated at the request of Stephen Timms, minister of the Department for Business, Enterprise and Regulatory Reform. In the early hours of 6 July 2007, the Metropolitan Police seized documents and computers from the First Solution head offices in London. These materials have now been requisitioned by the Companies Investigation Branch of the BERR (formerly DTI)

== Campaigns ==
On 8 July 2007, a rally was held at Altab Ali Park where George Galloway called on the government to compensate the victims for the money they lost in this scandal.

On 10 July 2007, George Galloway held a meeting with Kitty Ussher (Economic Secretary to the Treasury) and called on the government to set up a Farepak-style crisis fund to compensate the victims. The minister said there would be support for such a fund from the government and a statement would be made to parliament shortly on the First Solution crisis.

Hundreds of people demonstrated and lobbied MPs outside the houses of parliament on 11 July 2007. The government has confirmed it is planning a rescue package to compensate the victims although the government itself would not be donating any money into the fund. The issue was debated in Parliament on 18 July 2007.

On 3 August 2007, the Government's Official Receivers were appointed as provisional receivers at the request of the Secretary of State, Stephen Timms. A provisional court date of 6 November 2007 has been announced.

== See also ==
- British Bangladeshi
