= Aminul Hoque =

Bangladeshi-born British lecturer and writer

Aminul Hoque MBE
- আমিনুল হক
- Born: July 1977 (age 49); Sylhet district, Chittagong Division, Bangladesh
- Education: University of Sussex
- Occupations: Lecturer, writer, freelance journalist, broadcaster
- Children: 3
- Writing career
- Language: English
- Years active: 2004–present
- Genre: non-fiction
- Subjects: Young people, cultural identity
- Notable awards: Philip Lawrence Award

Aminul Hoque, MBE (Bengali: আমিনুল হক) is a Bangladeshi-born British lecturer and writer.

== Early life ==
Aminul Hoque was born to a Bengali Muslim family in the village of Bagir Ghat in Golapganj Upazila, Sylhet, Bangladesh. Aminul Hoque's father had been living and working in Britain since the early 1960s so the rest of his family joined him in 1980.

Aminul Hoque grew up in a predominantly Bangladeshi neighbourhood in Tower Hamlets. His early memories were of extreme poverty, overcrowding and experiencing racism. Aminul Hoque graduated from the University of Sussex. He completed two degrees and a PhD.

== Career ==
Since October 2008, Aminul Hoque has been a lecturer in the Department of Educational Studies at Goldsmiths, and a visiting lecturer at London Metropolitan University.

Aminul Hoque's writing and work focuses on issues of multicultural Britain, identity, social justice, youth policy, religion and race relations. In 2015, his book British-Islamic Identity: Third-generation Bangladeshis from East London was published.

In February 2015, he contributed in a discussion regarding the three British schoolgirls from Bethnal Green Academy who left home to join the Islamic State of Iraq and the Levant on BBC Radio Scotland and BBC Radio 4. In the same month, he spoke at the London Festival of Education, hosted by the Institute of Education. In April of the same year, he was interviewed by Nihal on BBC Asian Network. In May of the same year, he contributed on BBC Radio 4's Today programme. In July 2015, he was interviewed by Nadia Ali on BBC Asian Network about his Ramadan memories and the British Bangladeshi community.

Aminul Hoque's background is in youth, community and voluntary work. He is an expert in young people and cultural identity. Most of his community work is in Tower Hamlets. Hoque is also a freelance journalist and broadcaster. In 2020, he hosted an episode of A Very British History focusing on Bangladeshi emigration to the United Kingdom from the 1960s onwards.

Aminul Hoque served as a trustee on the board of Royal Museums Greenwich from 2016 to 2021. The Secretary of State for Digital, Culture, Media and Sport, Oliver Dowden, vetoed his reappointment for a second term in 2021. The chair of the board, Charles Dunstone, resigned in protest at the government's failure to reappoint Aminul Hoque. Aminul Hoque said that he was "shocked, disappointed and baffled" at Dowden's veto against his reappointment.

== Awards and recognition ==
In 2008, Aminul Hoque was appointed a Member of the Order of the British Empire (MBE) in the 2008 New Year Honours for his services to youth justice in East London. In 2005, he received a Philip Lawrence Award. In 2004, his radio documentary Islamic Pride was shortlisted for the Sony Awards.

== Personal life ==
Aminul Hoque is a Muslim He has three children. He is a Manchester United Football Club fan.

== Works ==
- Aminul Hoque. (January 2005). Long-Distance Nationalism: a Study of the Bagir Ghati Community Living in East London.
- Aminul Hoque. (2015). British-Islamic Identity: Third-generation Bangladeshis from East London. London: Trentham Books. 978-1-85856-603-0.

== See also ==
- British Bangladeshi
- List of British Bangladeshis
