= Rahemur Rahman =

British-Bengali Fashion Designer and Artist (born 1990)

Rahemur Rahman (born 1990) is a British-Bengali artist and fashion designer known for his significant contributions to the British-Bengali diaspora and innovative use of traditional Bengali block printing techniques through his eponymous menswear label. Rahman is known for his focus on sustainable and ethically produced garments and is the first Bangladeshi fashion designer in history to showcase his or her work at London Fashion Week.

== Early life ==
Rahman was born and raised in Tower Hamlets, London. Rahman's father worked as a tailor in the rag trade, the immigrant-run clothing manufacturing business that provides cheap labour for the fashion industry. Rahman's work is heavily influenced by his Bengali heritage and the city in which he grew up.

== Career ==
Rahman graduated from Central Saint Martins School of Art & Design, London, alongside fellow London-based designers Richard Malone and A Sai Ta. In 2019, he presented his first London Fashion Week collection entitled “For the people who dream in colour”; it aimed to reinterpret and re-tell stories of South Asian identity. Drawing inspiration from his family's photographs, his father's love of traditional British tailoring, and his mother's love of clothing from her homeland, Rahman's collection blended Western and South Asian elements, reflecting the cultural duality of his own family and their connection to the rag trade.

Rahman drew inspiration from 1990s family photos for his colour palette and used natural dyes and traditional Bangladeshi printing techniques, inspired by the Khadi prints found in the Victoria and Albert Museum, to create his garments. The clothing, made from cotton, wool, and silk, was tailored with attention to detail, featuring shirts and jackets with a graceful taper at the armpit. Block prints were created in collaboration with artisans at Aranya, a fairtrade enterprise in Dhaka, Bangladesh using natural dyes.

Rahman included South Asian representation in the presentation of his collection. He held the event at Brady Arts and Community Centre where he regularly teaches and exclusively featured South Asian models. His aim was to include a diverse range of backgrounds within the South Asian community, including Sikh, Muslim, Hindu, Indian, Pakistani, and Bangladeshi individuals, and stressed the importance of recognising the distinct cultural differences within the community.

In 2020, he showcased his second collection, “Children of the rag trade”, dedicating the collection to his father, who worked as a tailor in the rag trade. One suit from this collection was acquired by the Victoria and Albert Museum in London for their Fashioning Masculinities 2022 exhibition, making Rahman the first British-Bengali fashion designer in history to have his or her work featured in a V&A exhibition.

In addition to his work in fashion, Rahman is also an accomplished artist, working in a variety of media including print, installation and sculpture. His art often explores themes of identity and cultural exchange, and has been exhibited in galleries around the world such as the Victoria & Albert Museum and Museum of the Home.

My Home, My Bari is a community project led by Rahman. First exhibited in 2021 at the Kobi Nazrul Centre in the heart of Banglatown, London, My Home, My Bari offered a glimpse into life of Bangladeshi community living around 1970's Brick Lane and showcased the work and legacy of the local business owners from the British-Bangladeshi community and artistic outcomes of the nine-month participatory project with young Bangladeshi artists. The project was first commissioned by Tower Hamlets Council to create a collaborative and singular installation marking the 50th anniversary of the Independence of Bangladesh. In an article written about the project by Tower Hamlets Council, Rahman said “The project also recognises the importance of events which took place in 1971 but takes a step back to re-examine the era and bring it closer to home through the multi-layered connections and cultural connotations of the safe and familiar space of ‘home’.” In 2022, the second iteration of My Home, My Bari was commissioned by Museum of the Home, London (previously known as the Geffrye Museum), and saw Rahman continue the narrative with seven young British-Bangladeshi Muslim artists. The second iteration aimed to document the un-told stories of the Bengali women in the young artist's lives. Begum, a collaborative documentary-film, told these stories.

== Advocacy ==
As a member of the Bengali diaspora, Rahman is deeply committed to preserving and promoting his cultural heritage, and reimagining how queer creatives in the South Asian community are perceived. He is also an active member of the London art and fashion scenes, and is known for his collaborative spirit and dedication to mentoring emerging Muslim talents.

In the 2022 Evening Standard article “Fashion cares more about billionaire bile than those on the breadline: Fashion academics react to Kanye West”, Rahman stated “When we talk about the intersections of black identity within fashion, Kanye West will always be in that mix. His viewpoint; whether it is satire, whether it is serious political alignment, has to be discussed from the viewpoint of allowing different perspectives of the black experience to be documented in history. However problematic it is. Now whether we engage with it or not, is for me, truly the question we should be asking.”

Rahman has spoken out about the lack of South Asian representation within the fashion supply chain

== Recognition ==
- Finalist for the British Fashion Council's Changemakers “People” prize in 2021.
- Winner of Outstanding Achievements Award at British Bangladeshi Fashion Council in 2019
