= Guild of Bangladeshi Restaurateurs =

- Formation: 1994
- Type: Trade association
- Region served: United Kingdom
- Chairman: Enam Ali
- President: Ana Miah
- Website: www.gbruk.org.uk

Guild of Bangladeshi Restaurateurs is a national trade association for owners of UK-based Bangladeshi restaurants and caterers.

== Premise ==
Guild of Bangladeshi Restaurateurs was established by a group of caterers in 1994.

The association has membership of more than 2500 people. The primary role of the organisation is to lobby government, both nationally and locally, representing the views of the industry to decision makers and legislators. Its main aims and objectives also include the promotion and improvement of the standard of spice restaurants in Great Britain and increasing awareness amongst the general public of the positive contribution that the spice restaurant business makes to the British economy and culture.

The association has branches all over the United Kingdom, including Scotland, Wales and England. Branch activities include formal meetings, seminars and study days, catering supplier demonstration, exhibitions and social events.

The association was named by Abssar M Waess, other co-founders included, late Enam Ali MBE, Abdul Miah, and Azizur Rahman. Former chairman of the organisation was Enam Ali and the president of the organisation is Ana Miah.

In 2008, association members raised concerns that many restaurants were under threat because the British government announced a change in the immigration laws which could block entry of high skilled chefs from Bangladesh to the UK. They requested that the Government recognises that they are skilled workers. The law demanded these workers speak fluent English, and have good formal qualifications. However, these changes did not take place.

== See also ==
- Business of British Bangladeshis
- Bangladeshi cuisine
- British Bangladeshi
