= A Very British History =

2018 British TV series

- Genre: Factual
- Presented by: Damian Le Bas; Sue Brown; Shu Lin; Simon Glass; Meera Sodha; Aminul Hoque
- No. of episodes: 4

Production
- Executive producer: Tony Parker
- Producers: Diana Hare; Adam Keelan; Ed Barlow; Richard Taylor
- Running time: 60 minutes
- Production company: BBC England Productions

Original release
- Network: BBC Four; BBC One
- Release: 10 December 2018 – 4 March 2019

A Very British History is a British documentary television series that was broadcast on BBC Four. The four-part series explores migration to Britain in the 20th century and the shift in culture in various minority communities.

== Production ==
The series was commissioned by BBC Four Channel Editor Cassian Harrison and former Factual Commissioning Editor Clare Paterson.

== Episodes ==
Series 1
Title	Episode
Romany Gypsies	1
The First Black Brummies	2
The Jews of Leeds	3
Ugandan Asians	4

Series 2
Title	Episode
The British Chinese	1
Birmingham Irish I am	2
British Bangladeshis	3
Whatever Happened to the Boat People?	4

== Critical reception ==
The documentary series was praised for the engaging style of the presenters alongside calls for a second series to be commissioned. The series also provided a first-hand glimpse into the racism faced by immigrants to Britain in the 20th century. Additionally, it was noted that racism against minorities has not disappeared in the modern day.

== Broadcast ==
The series was originally broadcast on regional versions of BBC One.

== See also ==
- Windrush scandal
- British Asian
- British Jews
- Black British
- Romani people
- Who Do You Think You Are (British TV series)
