= Docklands & East London Advertiser =

London-based local newspaper

East London Advertiser
- Type: Weekly newspaper
- Format: Tabloid
- Owner: USA Today Co.
- Publisher: Newsquest
- Editor: Malcolm Starbrook
- Founded: 1866
- Headquarters: London
- Circulation: 4,963 (as of 2023)
- Website: eastlondonadvertiser.co.uk

The East London Advertiser is a mostly free weekly local newspaper in east London, England covering primarily the borough of Tower Hamlets. It was formed in late 2011 by Archant's merging of The Docklands and the East London Advertiser.

The East London Advertiser was founded in 1866 and initially based in Mile End Road, before moving to Paradise Row, Bethnal Green in 1978. It had been owned by Archant since 2003. It merged with freesheet The Docklands in 2011.

In June 2008 the East London Advertiser scooped two awards at the annual UK Press Gazette Regional Press Awards. It was named Weekly Paper of the Year (Circulation less than 20,000) and its deputy editor, Ted Jeory, was named Reporter of the Year (Weeklies), partly for his expose of the First Solution Money Transfer crisis in 2007.
