= The British Curry Awards =

UK Food industry

The British Curry Awards was an awards dinner, held annually from 2015 to 2022, and dedicated to the British curry industry. It was established in 2005 by Enam Ali Each individual award is split for geographic purposes – regional splits of Scotland, North West, North East, Midlands, Wales, South East, South West, London Central and City, and London Suburbs – and expertise. The awards themselves are in association with JustEat.com, an online food delivery service.

== Winners ==
The British Curry Awards were chosen annually from 2015 to 2022. In 2023, they were replaced with an annual book, British Curry Guide.

British Curry Awards, for the Best...
Year	casual dining restaurant	newcomer	delivery service	in the North West	in Wales	in the Midlands	of South East	in Scotland	in London Central and City	in the North East	in London Suburbs	in the South West
2015	Dabbawal	Calcutta Club	The Chilli Pickle, Brighton	The Viceroy in Carlisle	Sheesh Mahal, Llanelli	Pushkar	Shampan at The Spinning Wheel	Karma, Scotland	The Cinnamon Club, Westminster, London	Aagrah Leeds	Green Spice	Spice Lodge
2016	Dishoom, Covent Garden, London	Darbaar, Shoreditch, London	The Chilli Pickle, Brighton	Blue Tiffin, Royton, Oldham	Sheesh Mahal, Llanelli	Asha's, Birmingham	Maliks, Gerrards Cross, Buckinghamshire	Karma, Whitburn, Bathgate	The Cinnamon Club, Westminster, London	Aakash, Cleckheaton, West Yorkshire	Shampan Welling, Bexley	Prithvi, Cheltenham, Gloucestershire

During the COVID-19 pandemic, a virtual award ceremony was held with different categories:

British Curry Awards, for the Best...
Year	London restaurant in the pandemic	Inspirational woman	Entrepreneur	Family restaurant team	Inspirational person	Outstanding service to local community	Special recognition for media coverage	Takeaway during the pandemic	Outstanding service during the pandemic	Leadership in the pandemic	Outstanding service in the pandemic	Outstanding service during the pandemic	Unsung chef
2020	Atul Kochhar, Kanishka London	Pervin Todiwala, Cafe Spice Namaste	Jalf Ali, Dabbawal/Khai Khai Newcastle	Gulu Anand, Brilliant Southall	Dabirul Islam-Choudhury OBE	Zakir Khan, Zyka Restaurant Reading	Mohammad Jubair, Channel S	Safwaan Choudhury, British Raj Takeaway	Habibur Khan, Radhuni Scotland	Salim Choudhury, British Bangladeshi Caterers Association	Naz Islam, Saffron Northampton	Sujit D'Almeida, Urban Tandoor Bristol	Raman Shah, Eastleigh

After the pandemic, the categories changed slightly.

British Curry Awards, for the Best...
Year	Scotland	North East	North West	East Midlands	West Midlands	Wales	South East	South West	London Central and City	London Suburbs	Takeaway	Newcomer	Other
2021	Dishoom, Edinburgh	Mumtaz, Bradford	Asha's, Manchester	Montaz, Newmarket	Pushkar, Birmingham	Purple Poppadom, Cardiff	Chez Mumtaz, St Albans	Prithvi, Cheltenham	Benares, Mayfair	Shampan Bromley	Maliks Express Kitchen, Gerrards Cross	Mathura, Westminster, London	(most innovative) Khai Khai, Newcastle
2022	Swadish by Ajay Kumar, Glasgow	Khai Khai Indian Restaurant, Newcastle	Mowgli Street Food Liverpool	Calcutta Club Restaurant, Nottingham	Lasan, Birmingham	Purple Poppadom, Cardiff	Shampan at the Spinning Wheel, Westerham, Kent	Prithvi Restaurant, Cheltenham	Benares, Mayfair	Copper Ceylon, Bromley	Maliks Express Kitchen, Gerrads Cross	Colonel Saab, Holborn	(Personality of the year) Khalilur Rahman
