= British Bangladeshis =

Citizens of the United Kingdom whose ancestral roots lie in Bangladesh

বিলাতী বাংলাদেশী
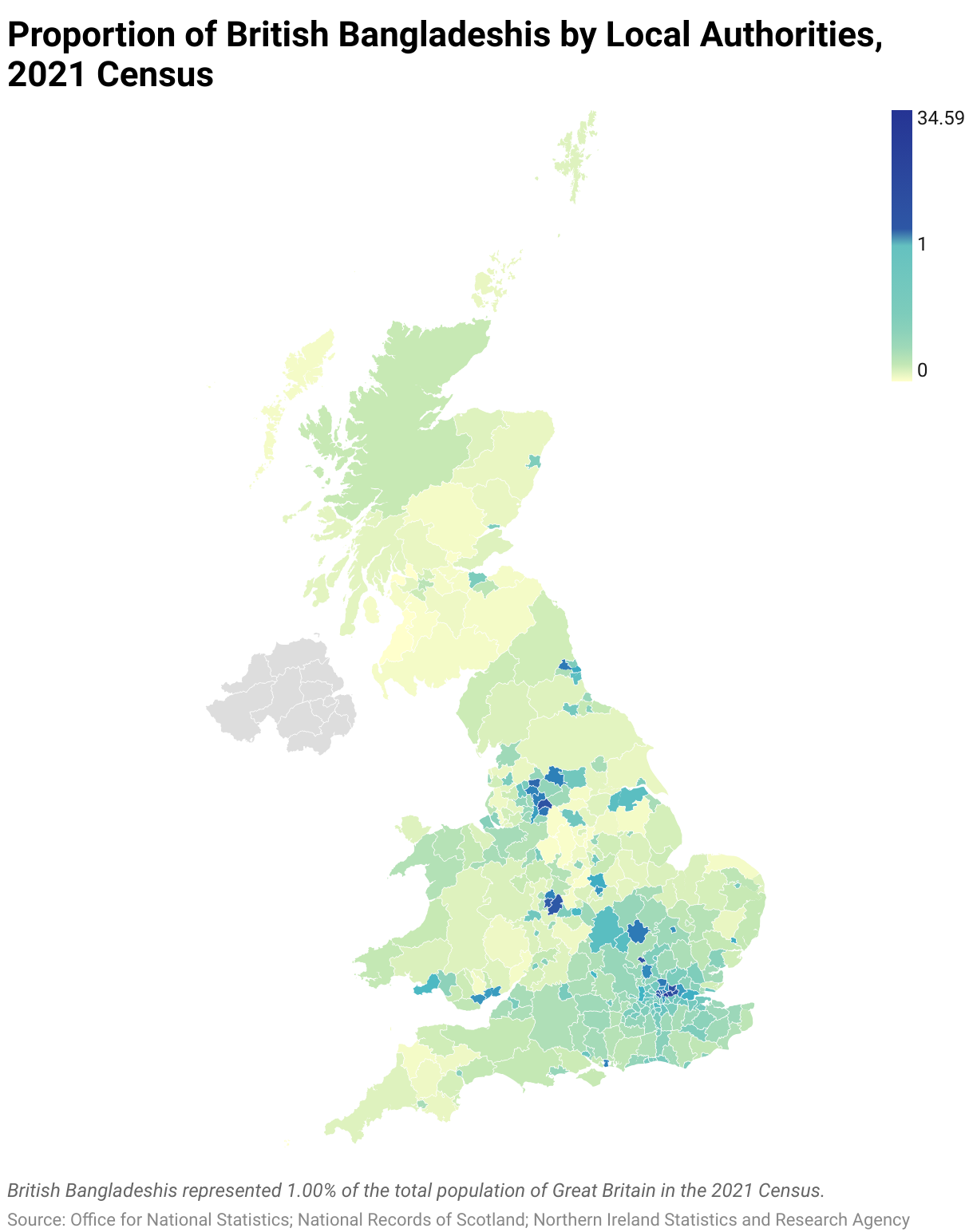
- Distribution of British Bangladeshis by local authority in Great Britain, 2021 census

Total population
- 652,535 (2021/22) (Note: In 2021 and 2022, Scotland held its census a year later after England, Wales and Northern Ireland due to the COVID-19 pandemic. As a result, the data shown is from two separate years, see Demographics for more information); 1% of the total UK population (2021/22)

Regions with significant populations
- London; Luton; Oldham; Birmingham; Burnley; Bedford; Newcastle; Bradford

Languages
- English · Bengali · Sylheti)

Religion
- Predominantly Islam (92.0%); minority follow other faiths (1.5%) (Note: Including Hinduism (1.0%), Christianity (0.3%), Buddhism (0.1%), Sikhism (0.03%) and Judaism (0.01%)) or irreligious (1.5%); 2021 census, England and Wales only

Related ethnic groups
- British Asians; British Indians; British Pakistanis; Bangladeshi diaspora; Bangladeshis; Bengalis

British Bangladeshis (Bengali: বিলাতী বাংলাদেশী, romanized: Bilatī Bangladeshī) are citizens or residents of the United Kingdom whose ancestral roots are from Bangladesh. Bengali Muslims have prominently been migrating to the UK since World War II. Migration reached its peak during the 1970s, with most originating from the Sylhet Division. A large concentration live in London Borough of Tower Hamlets. This large diaspora in London leads people in Sylhet to refer to British Bangladeshis as Londonis (Bengali: লন্ডনী).

== History ==
=== Pre-contemporary era ===
Bengalis have been present in Britain as early as the 19th century. One of the earliest records of a Bengali migrant, by the name of Saeed Ullah, can be found in Robert Lindsay's autobiography. Saeed Ullah was said to have migrated not only for work but also to attack Lindsay and avenge his elders for the Muharram Rebellion of 1782. Other early records of arrivals from the region that is now known as Bangladesh are of Sylheti cooks in London during 1873, in the employment of the East India Company, who travelled to the UK as lascars on ships to work in restaurants.

The first educated South Asian to travel to Europe and live in Britain was I'tisam-ud-Din, a Bengali Muslim cleric, Munshi and diplomat to the Mughal Empire who arrived in 1765 with his servant Muhammad Muqim during the reign of King George III. He wrote of his experiences and travels in his Persian book, Shigurf-nama-i-Wilayat (or 'Wonder Book of Europe'). This is also the earliest record of literature by a British Asian. Also during the reign of George III, the hookah-bardar (hookah servant/preparer) of James Achilles Kirkpatrick was said to have robbed and cheated Kirkpatrick, making his way to England and stylising himself as the Prince of Sylhet. The man was waited upon by the prime minister of Great Britain William Pitt the Younger, and then dined with the Duke of York before presenting himself in front of the King.

Many Sylheti people believed that seafaring was a historical and cultural inheritance due to a large proportion of Sylheti Muslims being descended from foreign traders, lascars and businessman from the Middle East and Central Asia who migrated to the Sylhet region before and after the Conquest of Sylhet. Khala Miah, who was a Sylheti migrant, claimed this was a very encouraging factor for Sylhetis to travel to Calcutta aiming to eventually reach the United States and United Kingdom. A crew of lascars would be led by a Serang. Serangs were ordered to recruit crew members themselves by the British and so they would go into their own villages and areas in the Sylhet region often recruiting their family and neighbours. The British had no problem with this as it guaranteed the group of lascars would be in harmony. According to lascars Moklis Miah and Mothosir Ali, up to forty lascars from the same village would be in the same ship.

Shah Abdul Majid Qureshi claimed to be the first Sylheti to own a restaurant in the country. It was called Dilkush and was located in Soho. Another one of his restaurants, known as India Centre, alongside early Sylheti migrant Ayub Ali Master's Shah Jalal cafe, became a hub for the British Asian community and a site where the India League would hold meetings attracting influential figures such as Subhas Chandra Bose, Krishna Menon and Mulk Raj Anand. Ayub Ali was also the president of the All India Muslim League having links with Liaquat Ali Khan and Mohammad Ali Jinnah.

=== Contemporary era ===
Some ancestors of British Bangladeshis went to the UK before the Second World War. Author Caroline Adams records that in 1925 a lost Bengali man was searching for other Bengali settlers in London. These first few arrivals started the process of "chain migration" mainly from one region of Bangladesh, Sylhet, which led to substantial numbers of people migrating from rural areas of the region, creating links between relatives in Britain and the region. They mainly immigrated to the United Kingdom to find work, achieve a better standard of living, and to escape conflict. During the pre-state years, the 1950s and 1960s, Bengali men immigrated to London in search of employment. Most settled in Tower Hamlets, particularly around Spitalfields and Brick Lane. In 1971, Bangladesh (until then known as "East Pakistan") fought for its independence from West Pakistan in what was known as the Bangladesh Liberation War. In the region of Sylhet, this led some to join the Mukti Bahini, or Liberation Army.

In the 1970s, changes in immigration laws encouraged a new wave of Bangladeshis to come to the UK and settle. Job opportunities were initially limited to low paid sectors, with unskilled and semi-skilled work in small factories and the textile trade being common. When the 'Indian' restaurant concept became popular, some Sylhetis started to open cafes. From these small beginnings a network of Bangladeshi restaurants, shops and other small businesses became established in Brick Lane and surrounding areas. The influence of Bangladeshi culture and diversity began to develop across the East London boroughs.

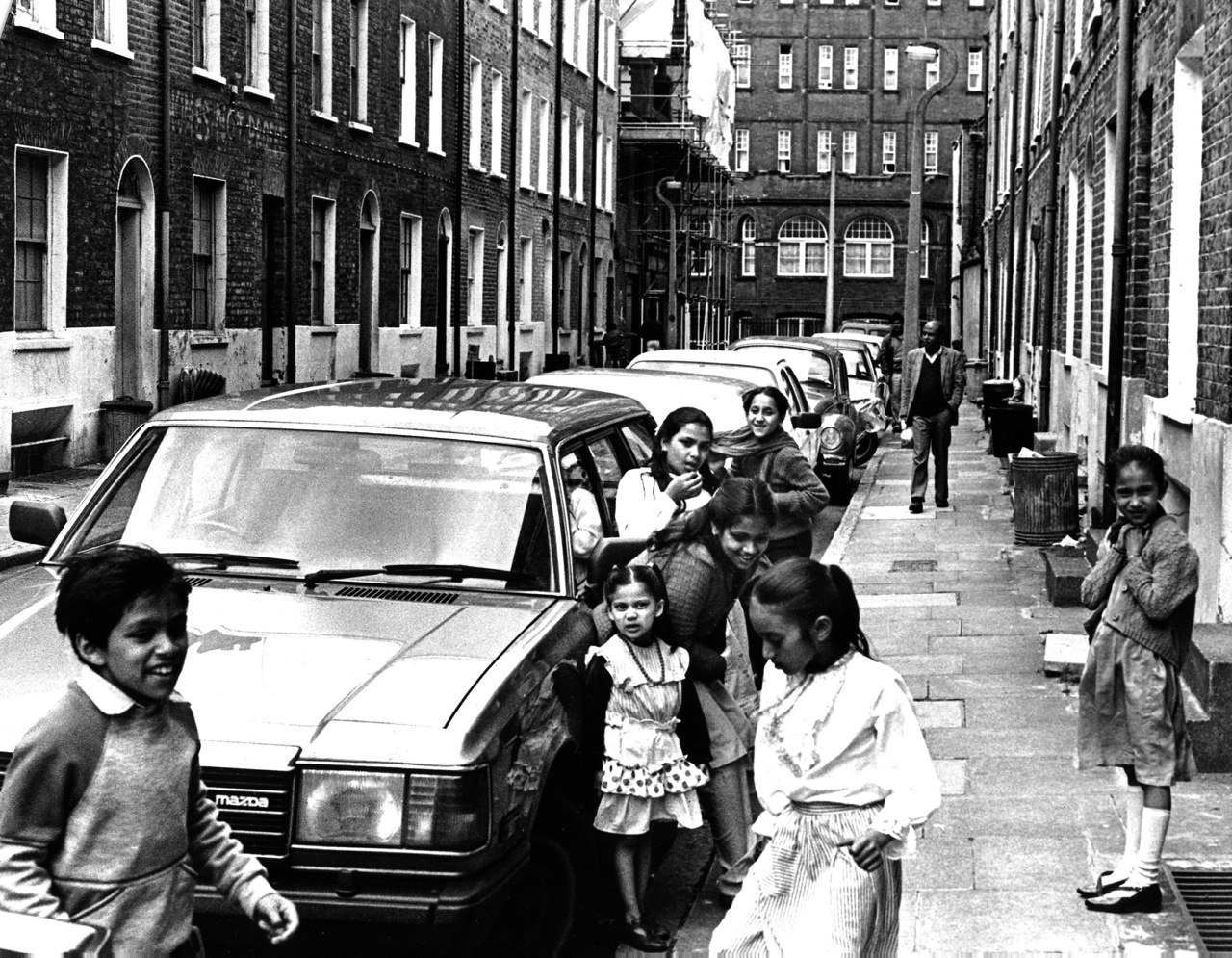
Bangladeshi children in East London, 1986

The early immigrants lived and worked mainly in cramped basements and attics within the Tower Hamlets area. The men were often illiterate, poorly educated, and spoke little English, so they could not interact well with the English-speaking population and could not enter higher education. Some became targets for businessmen, who sold their properties to Sylhetis, even though they had no legal claim to the buildings.

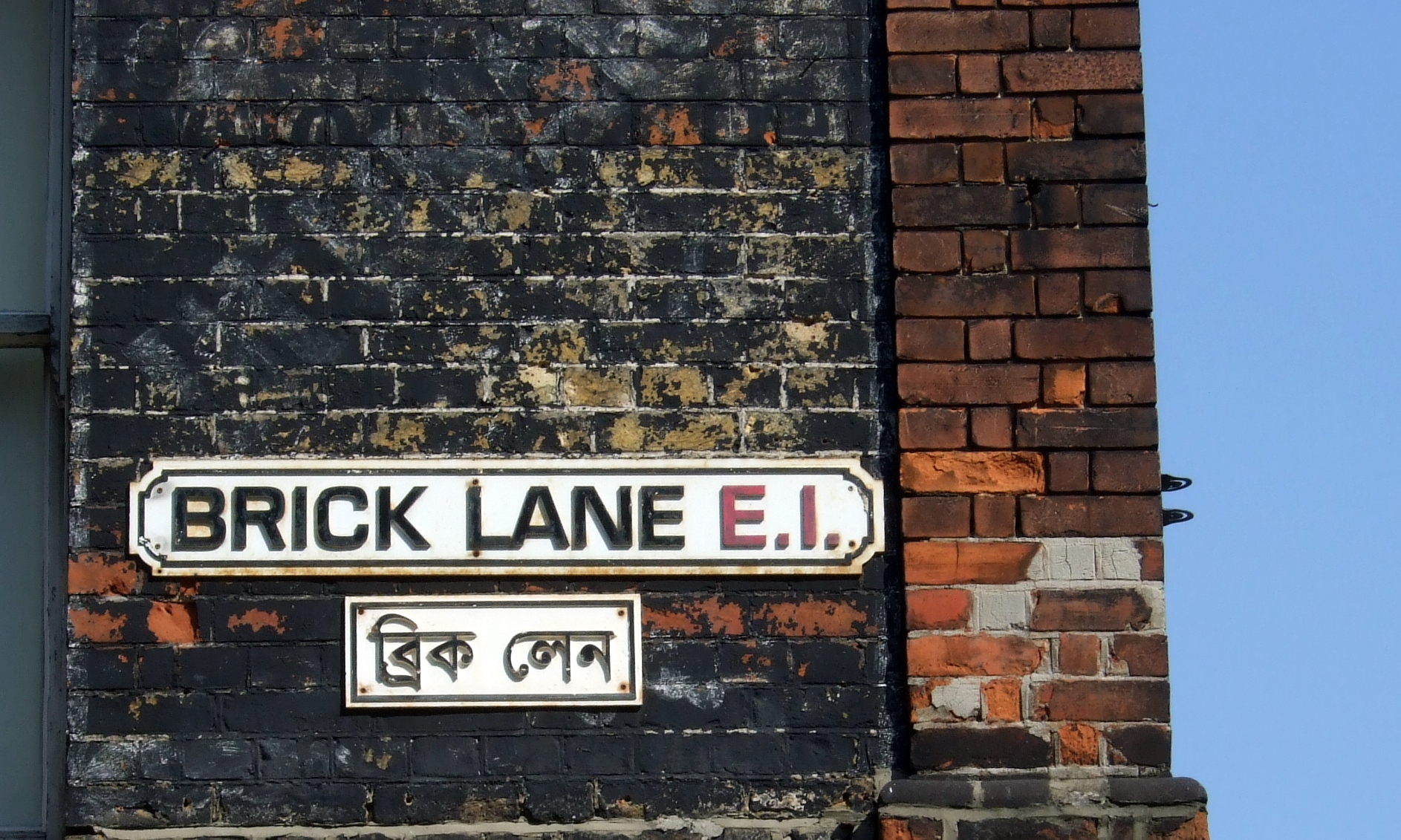
Large numbers of Bangladeshis settled and established themselves in Brick Lane.

By the late 1970s, the Brick Lane area had become predominantly Bengali, replacing the former Jewish community which had declined. Jews migrated to outlying suburbs of London, as they integrated with the majority British population. Jewish bakeries were turned into curry houses, jewellery shops became sari stores, and synagogues became dress factories. The synagogue at the corner of Fournier Street and Brick Lane became the Brick Lane Jamme Masjid or 'Brick Lane Mosque', which continues to serve the Bangladeshi community to this day. This building represents the history of successive communities of immigrants in this part of London. It was built in 1743 as a French Protestant church; in 1819 it became a Methodist chapel, and in 1898 was designated as the Spitalfields Great Synagogue. It was finally sold, to become the Jamme Masjid.

The period also however saw a rise in the number of attacks on Bangladeshis in the area, in a reprise of the racial tensions of the 1930s, when Oswald Mosley's Blackshirts had marched against the Jewish communities. In nearby Bethnal Green the anti-immigrant National Front became active, distributing leaflets on the streets and holding meetings. White youths known as "skinheads" appeared in the Brick Lane area, vandalising property and reportedly spitting on Bengali children and assaulting women. Bengali children were allowed out of school early; women walked to work in groups to shield them from potential violence. Parents began to impose curfews on their children, for their own safety; flats were protected against racially motivated arson by the installation of fire-proof letterboxes.

Protest march by Bangladeshis to Downing Street with murdered Altab Ali's coffin, 1978

On 4 May 1978, Altab Ali, a 24-year-old Bangladeshi leather clothing worker, was murdered by three teenage boys as he walked home from work in a racially motivated attack. The murder took place near the corner of Adler Street and Whitechapel Road, by St Mary's Churchyard. This murder mobilised the Bangladeshi community in Britain. Demonstrations were held in the area of Brick Lane against the National Front, and groups such as the Bangladesh Youth Movement were formed. On 14 May, over 7,000-10,000 people, mostly Bangladeshis, took part in a demonstration against racial violence, marching behind Altab Ali's coffin to Hyde Park. Some youths formed local gangs and carried out reprisal attacks on their skinhead opponents (see Youth gangs).

The name "Altab Ali" became associated with a movement of resistance against racist attacks, and remains linked with this struggle for human rights. His murder was the trigger for the first significant political organisation against racism by local Bangladeshis. The identification and association of British Bangladeshis with Tower Hamlets owes much to this campaign. A park has been named after Altab Ali at the street where he was murdered. In 1993, racial violence was incited by the anti-immigration British National Party (BNP); several Bangladeshi students were severely injured, but the BNP's attempted inroads were stopped after demonstrations of Bangladeshi resolve.

In 1986, the House of Commons Home Affairs Committee's race relations and immigration sub-committee conducted an inquiry called Bangladeshis in Britain. In evidence given to the committee by Home Office officials, they noted that an estimated 100,000 Bangladeshis lived in Great Britain. The evidence also noted issues of concern to the Bangladesh community, including "immigration arrangements; relationships with the police (particularly in the context of racial harassment or attacks); and the provision of suitable housing, education, and personal, health and social services". A Home Office official noted that the Sylheti dialect was "the ordinary means of communication for about 95 per cent of the people who come from Bangladesh" and that all three Bengali interpreters employed at Heathrow Airport spoke Sylheti, including Abdul Latif.

In 1988, a "friendship link" between the city of St Albans in Hertfordshire and the municipality of Sylhet was created by the district council under the presidency of Muhammad Gulzar Hussain of Bangladesh Welfare Association, St Albans. BWA St Albans were able to name a road in Sylhet municipality (now Sylhet City Corporation) called St Albans Road. This link between the two cities was established when the council supported housing project in the city as part of the International Year of Shelter for the Homeless initiative. It was also created because Sylhet is the area of origin for the largest ethnic minority group in St Albans. In April 2001, the London Borough of Tower Hamlets council officially renamed the 'Spitalfields' electoral ward Spitalfields and Banglatown. Surrounding streets were redecorated, with lamp posts painted in green and red, the colours of the Bangladeshi flag. By this stage the majority living in the ward were of Bangladeshi origin—nearly 60% of the population.

== Demographics ==
British Bangladeshis by region and country
Region / Country	2021 (Note: 2021/22: England and Wales, Scotland, and Northern Ireland)		2011 (Note: 2011: England and Wales, Scotland, and Northern Ireland)		2001 (Note: 2001: England and Wales, Scotland, and Northern Ireland)		1991 (Note: 1991: Great Britain. Northern Ireland did not record ethnic group data in the 1991 census.)	
Region / Country	Number	%	Number	%	Number	%	Number	%
England	629,583	1.11%	436,514	0.82%	275,394	0.56%	157,881	0.34%
—Greater London	322,054	3.66%	222,127	2.72%	153,893	2.15%	85,738	1.28%
—West Midlands	77,518	1.30%	52,477	0.94%	31,401	0.60%	19,415	0.38%
—North West	60,859	0.82%	45,897	0.65%	26,003	0.39%	15,016	0.22%
—East of England	50,685	0.80%	32,992	0.56%	18,503	0.34%	10,934	0.22%
—South East	39,881	0.43%	27,951	0.32%	15,358	0.19%	8,546	0.11%
—Yorkshire and the Humber	29,018	0.53%	22,424	0.42%	12,330	0.25%	8,347	0.17%
—East Midlands	20,980	0.43%	13,258	0.29%	6,923	0.17%	4,161	0.11%
—North East	16,355	0.61%	10,972	0.42%	6,167	0.25%	3,416	0.13%
—South West	12,217	0.21%	8,416	0.16%	4,816	0.10%	2,308	0.05%
Wales	15,317	0.49%	10,687	0.35%	5,436	0.19%	3,820	0.13%
Scotland	6,934 (Note: Scotland held its census a year later after the rest of the United Kingdom due to the COVID-19 pandemic. As a result, data shown is for 2022 as opposed to 2021.)	0.12%	3,788	0.07%	1,981	0.04%	1,134	0.02%
Northern Ireland	710	0.04%	540	0.03%	252	0.01%	—N/a	—N/a
United Kingdom	652,535	0.97%	451,529	0.71%	283,063	0.42%	162,835 (Note: Figures are for Great Britain only, i.e. excludes Northern Ireland)	0.30%

=== Population ===
Bangladeshis in England and Wales in 2021 in a population pyramid

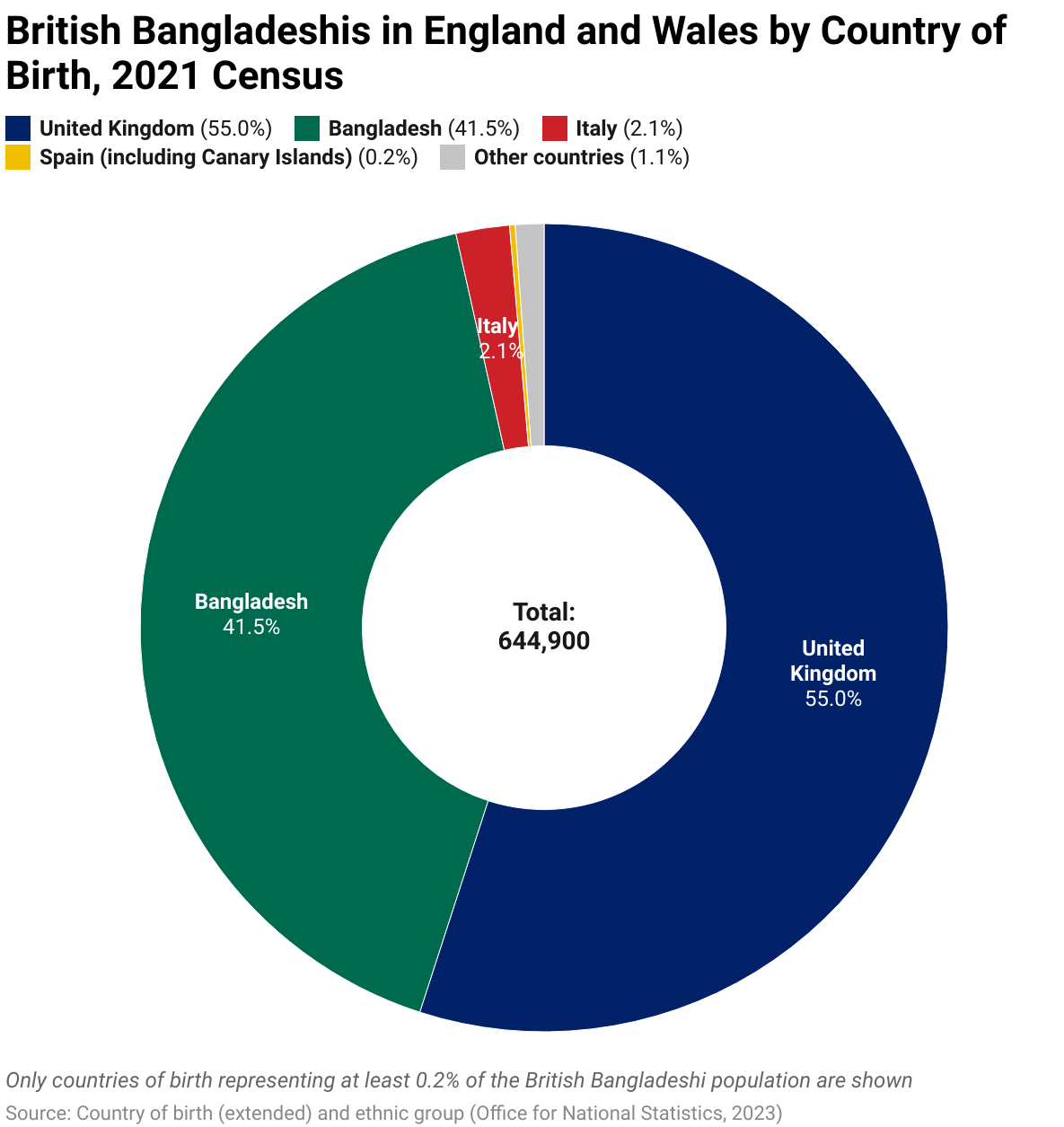
Country of birth (2021 census, England and Wales)

Year of arrival (2021 census, England and Wales)
1. Born in the UK (55.0%)
2. Before 1951 (0.01%)
3. 1951 to 1960 (0.10%)
4. 1961 to 1970 (1.20%)
5. 1971 to 1980 (3.90%)
6. 1981 to 1990 (8.30%)
7. 1991 to 2000 (6.70%)
8. 2001 to 2010 (10.4%)
9. 2011 to 2021 (14.5%)

Bangladeshis in the UK are largely a young population, heavily concentrated in London's inner boroughs. In the 2011 Census 451,529 UK residents specified their ethnicity as Bangladeshi, forming 0.7% of the total population. In the 2021 census, there were a total of 652,535 Bangladeshis in the United Kingdom, forming just under 1% of the total population.

Nearly half of the population live in London, with a heavy concentration mainly in East London boroughs. London's Bangladeshi population in 2021 was 322,054, the highest concentrations were found in Tower Hamlets (34.59% of total borough population), Newham (15.86%), Redbridge (10.28%), Barking and Dagenham (10.23%) and Camden (6.83%). In Wales, the highest concentration was in Cardiff at 1.90% and in Scotland, the highest proportion was in Edinburgh at 0.52%. Northern Ireland's census did not provide data on the proportion of Bangladeshis by local government district. The largest populations outside London are in Birmingham, where there were 48,232 Bangladeshis in 2021 (4.21% of the population), Oldham with 21,754 (8.99%), and Luton with a population of 20,630 (9.16%).

Based on the 2011 census, 52% of Bangladeshis were British-born, while 48% were born outside of the UK of which 212,000 were born in Bangladesh. In the same year, there was a slightly larger male than female population, with 52% male and 48% female. Bangladeshis are one of the youngest of the UK's ethnic populations. In 2011, 38.3% were aged between 0–17, 56.9% were aged between 18-59 and only 4.9% were aged 60 and over.

Majority of British Bangladeshis originate from several upazilas (equivalent to a county) of one of the four districts in the Sylhet Division. Most originate from the Sylhet District upazilas of Balaganj, Beanibazar, Bishwanath, Fenchuganj and Golapganj. Upazilas outside of the Sylhet District which have the highest numbers of origin include Jagannathpur, Sunamganj District, Maulvibazar, Maulvibazar District, and Nabiganj, Habiganj District.

Since 2012/13, it is estimated that around 20,000 Italian Bangladeshis had settled in the UK, according to the Bangladeshi Italian Welfare Association (based on figures provided by the Embassy of Italy, London). Majority had settled within the long-established Bangladeshi community in East London. Many were skilled graduates who left their homes in South Asia attracted by jobs in Italy's industrial north, but moved to the UK when Italian manufacturing jobs went into decline.

=== Religion ===
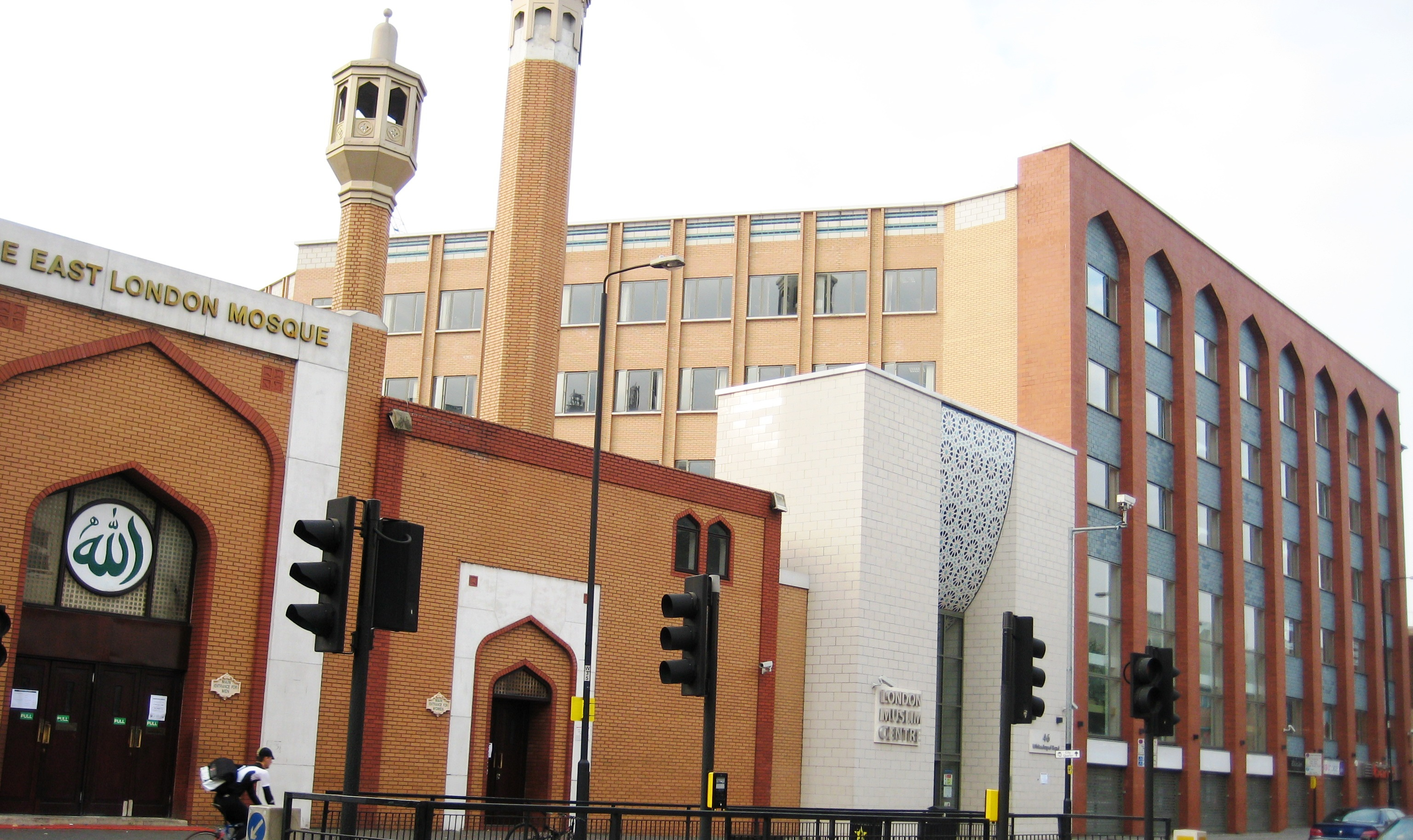
The East London Mosque located in Whitechapel, London, is one of the largest mosques in the west with a majority Bangladeshi congregation

British Bangladeshis are overwhelmingly Muslim, with the largest number of followers of a single religion among any ethnic group in the UK (along with Pakistanis), though there are small minorities who adhere to other religions or identify as irreligious. In London, Bangladeshi Muslims make up 22.4% of all London Muslims, more than any other single ethnic group in the capital. Majority are Sunni with the largest affiliations include Deobandi or Tablighi Jamaat, the Jamaat-e-Islami movement, and the Sufi Fuloti movement founded by Saheb Qiblah Fultali. The Hizb ut-Tahrir, and the Salafi movement also have a small following.

A majority of older women wear the burqa, and young women are wearing the niqab, whereas in Bangladesh, comparatively few women do so; this has been described as a "British phenomenon". Arabic is also learned by children, many of whom attend Qur'an classes at mosques or the madrasah. Many male youths are also involved with Islamic groups, which include the Young Muslim Organisation, affiliated with the Islamic Forum Europe. This group is based in Tower Hamlets, and has thus attracted mainly young Bangladeshi Muslims. It has been increasingly associated with the East London Mosque, which is one of the largest mosques used predominantly by Bangladeshis. In 2004, the mosque created a new extension attached, the London Muslim Centre which holds up to 10,000 people.

Religion	England and Wales			
Religion	2011		2021	
Religion	Number	%	Number	%
Islam	402,428	90.0%	593,136	92.0%
No religion	6,093	1.4%	9,358	1.5%
Hinduism	4,013	0.9%	6,220	1.0%
Christianity	6,558	1.5%	2,220	0.3%
Sikhism	672	0.2%	187	0.03%
Buddhism	534	0.1%	494	0.1%
Judaism	223	0.05%	87	0.01%
Other religions	158	0.04%	318	0.05%
Not Stated	26,522	5.9%	32,862	5.1%
Total	447,201	100%	644,882	100%

=== Language ===
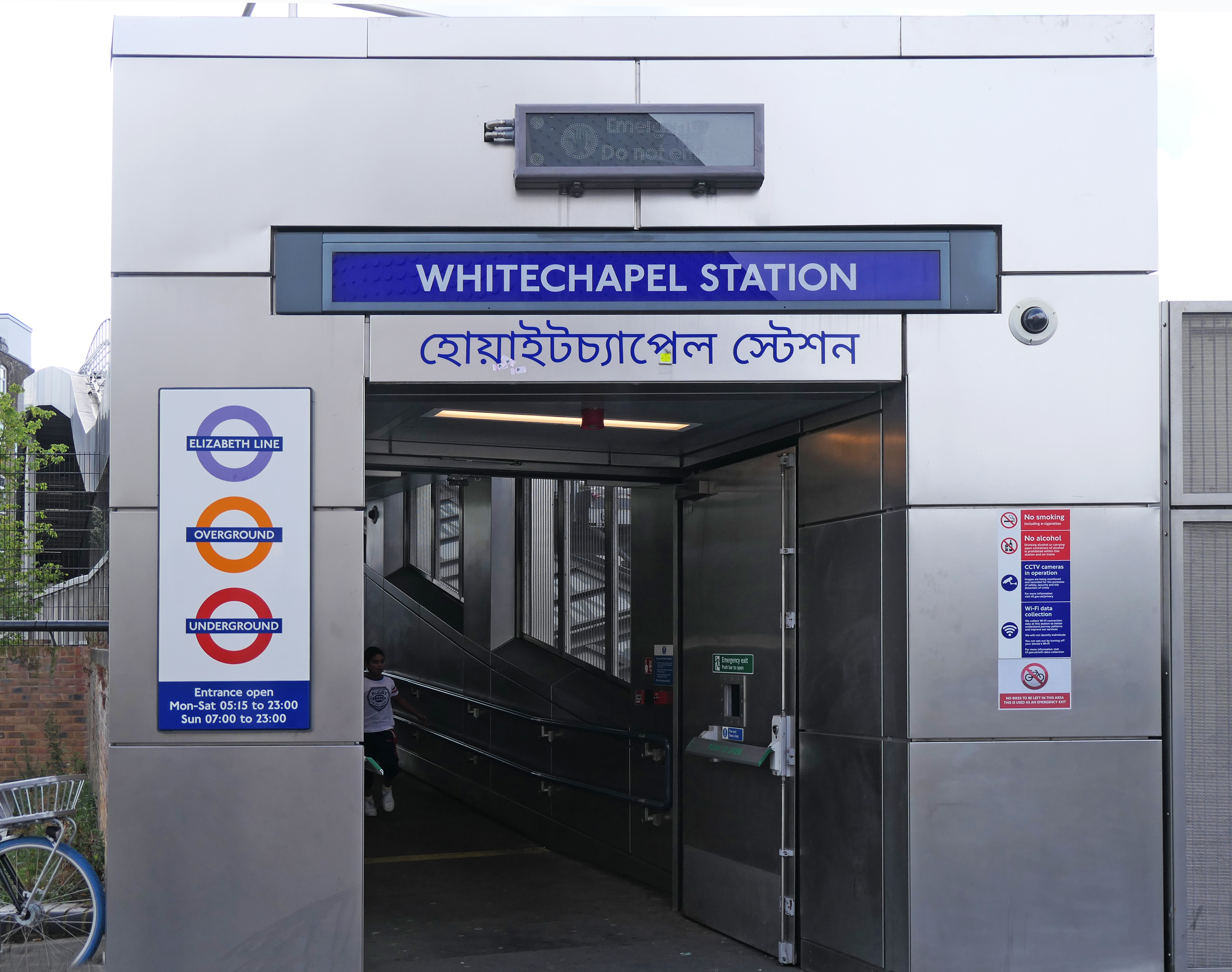
Whitechapel station sign with Bengali transliteration, in East London

According to the 2021 census, nearly 70 percent of British Bangladeshis speak English as their main language, while 20 percent are fluent or proficient in it. Sylheti remains the most commonly spoken heritage language, with an estimated 400,000 speakers. English is predominantly used by the younger generation, while Sylheti is more common amongst the older generation. In recent years, an emerging Sylheti-Cockney variety has also been observed among younger British Bangladeshis in London. This blend often intertwines with Multicultural London English (MLE), where influences from Bangladeshi English further shape the vernacular, merging with the local slang.

Although Sylheti is generally considered as a dialect of Bengali, many linguists view Sylheti as an independent language. In the UK, the widespread use of Sylheti as the primary vernacular by a majority not influenced by standard Bengali has prompted some to regard it as a separate language. There had been unsuccessful attempts by a fringe group during the 1980s to recognise Sylheti as a language in Tower Hamlets, which lacked much support from the community as most favoured standard Bengali to be taught in "mother tongue" classes. However, in 2017, British schools recognised Sylheti as one of the native languages spoken by students. BBC News has also broadcast online videos relating to COVID-19 in five major South Asian languages which included Sylheti. Despite Sylheti being primarily a spoken language, some linguists are attempting to revive a script that was historically used in the Sylhet region called, Sylheti Nagri. The "Sylheti Project" at SOAS University of London is particularly noteworthy for its efforts to promote the cultural significance of Sylheti.

Standard Bengali maintains its prominence in British Bangladeshi media and is considered as a prestige language which helps to foster a cultural or national identity linked with Bangladesh. Parents therefore encourage young people to attend Bengali classes to learn the language. Although many Sylheti speakers find this learning progress difficult in the UK. Bengali is offered as a subject in GCSE and A-Level qualifications, with 437 and 17 entries respectively, as of 2024. Language Movement Day, or Language Martyrs' Day (Shôhid Dibôs), commemorates the Bengali language martyrs and is also observed in the UK. A Shaheed Minar was erected in Altab Ali Park, Tower Hamlets, in 1999, with a similar monument in Oldham. Each year, on February 20, the community gathers to lay wreaths at these monuments. Most Italian Bangladeshis who immigrated to the UK primarily speak standard Bengali, though Italian is also spoken within this emerging community.

One way in which British Bangladeshis try to hold on to their links to Bangladesh is by sending their British-born children to school there. Pupils are taught the National Curriculum for England and children born in the UK are dotted among those in the classroom.

== Socioeconomics ==
=== Employment ===
Since 2004, the combined Bangladeshi and Pakistani communities have consistently had the lowest rate of employment out of all ethnic groups, although this figure has improved from 44% in 2004 to 58% in 2021. Bangladeshis are now mainly employed in the distribution, hotel and restaurant industries. New generation Bangladeshis, however, aspire to professional careers, becoming doctors, engineers, IT management specialists, teachers and in business. In 2011 within England and Wales, nearly-half (48%) of British Bangladeshis in the 16 to 64 age group were reported to be employed, while 40% were economically inactive and 10% unemployed. Men were more likely to be employed than women, with 65% of men in employment against 30% of women. Of those employed, 53% were working within the low-skill sector. Bangladeshis were most likely to be employed in accommodation and food services (27.3%), 18.8% in wholesale and retail trade, 9.2% in education, 8.8% in human health and social work, and the rest in many other sectors of employment. In 2021, Bangladeshis were the most likely ethnic group to be economically inactive with 35% of 16 to 64-year-olds out of work and not looking for employment, rising to 51% for Bangladeshi women compared to 24% of White British women.

According to research by Yaojun Li from the University of Manchester in 2016, while the employment rate of Bangladeshis has improved and the proportion of women in work has risen by one-third in the last five years, it is still weaker than educational performance. Nine per cent of working age Bangladeshis are unemployed which is almost twice the national average. In Tower Hamlets, an estimated one-third of young Bangladeshis are unemployed, one of the highest such rates in the country.

In 2021, 58% of Bangladeshi 16 to 64-year-olds were employed, compared to 78% of British Indians, 76% of White British, and 67% of Black Britons. The employment rate for Bangladeshi 16 to 24-year-olds was 37%, compared to 56% of White British and 31% of Black Britons. The average hourly pay for British Bangladeshis in the same year was the lowest out of all ethnicity groups at £12.03, alongside British Pakistanis. According to aggregated Department for Work and Pensions data between 2018 and 2021, 24% of Bangladeshi families were in receipt of income-related benefits, compared to 16% of White British families and 8% of British Chinese and Indian families. Bangladeshi families were also the most likely ethnicity to be in receipt of the disability living allowance (in both the care component and the mobility component), child benefit, child tax credit, pension credit, working tax credit, housing benefit, and the most likely Asian ethnicity to reside in social housing. Since 2008, British Bangladeshis have consistently been the most likely ethnicity group to live in households classified as low income (after housing costs) at 63% in 2008 falling to 55% in 2020. British Bangladeshis have the highest overall relative poverty rate of any ethnic group in the UK. The Economist has argued that the lack of a second income in households was "the main reason" why many Bangladeshi families live below the poverty line and the resulting high proportion reliant on welfare payments from the government.

In 2022, Bangladeshi and Pakistani women faced significant unemployment and economic inactivity challenges. The combined economic inactivity rate for these women was 48.1%, higher than that of other minority ethnic groups. Their unemployment rate reached 10.7% nationally and 16.9% in London, the highest among all women. Bangladeshi women experienced large gender pay gaps earning around 50% less than men.

In 2025, unemployment rates among the Bangladeshi and Pakistani communities in the UK, particularly in London, remained among the highest, with 39.5% of working-age Bangladeshis and Pakistanis unemployed, the highest rate of any ethnic group in the capital.

=== Education ===
In December 2016, according to a Social Mobility Commission study, children of Bangladeshi origin are among the British Asians who 'struggle for top jobs despite better school results'. The UK's Social Mobility Commission commissioned an 'Ethnicity, Gender and Social Mobility' report with research carried out by academics from LKMco and Education Datalab which found that there has been an increase in educational attainment for Bangladeshi origin pupils in the UK and their performance has improved at a more rapid rate than other ethnic groups in recent years at almost every key stage of education. Almost half of young Bangladeshi people from the poorest quintile go to university. However, this is not reflected or translating in labour market outcomes because although young people from Bangladeshi backgrounds are more likely to "succeed in education and go to university," they are less likely to go on to "find employment or secure jobs in managerial or professional occupations." The report also found that female Bangladeshi graduations are less likely to gain managerial and professional roles than male Bangladeshis graduates, despite achieving at school. British Bangladeshi women earn less than other ethnic minority groups.

Ofsted reports from secondary schools have shown that many Bangladeshi pupils are making significant progress, compared with other ethnic minority groups. Girls are more likely to do better in education than boys; 55% of girls are achieving 5 or more A*-C at GCSE, compared to 41% boys, as of 2004. The overall achievement rate for Bangladeshi pupils was 48%, compared with 53% for all UK pupils, in 2004. By 2013, the British Bangladeshi achievement rate (5 or more A*-C at GCSE) had increased considerably to 61%, compared to 56% for White British students and 51% for British Pakistani students. It was reported in 2014, there were a total of 60,699 graduates of Bangladeshi descent. In November 2015, an Institute for Fiscal Studies (IFS) report said that Bangladeshi children living in the UK have a nearly 49 per cent higher chance on average of a university education than white British pupils.

Until 1998, Tower Hamlets, where the concentration of British Bangladeshis is greatest was the worst performing local authority in England. Until 2009, Bangladeshis in England performed worse than the national average. In 2015, 62 per cent of British Bangladeshis got five good GCSEs, including English and Maths which is five per cent above the average, and Bangladeshi girls outperformed boys by eight per cent. In February 2018, according to a report from social mobility by the Sutton Trust, British Bangladeshi students are over six times more likely than white students to stay living at home and studying nearby.

According to Department for Education statistics for the 2021–22 academic year, British Bangladeshi pupils in England attained below the national average for academic performance at A-Level, but above the national average for GCSE level. 16.5% of British Bangladeshi pupils achieved at least 3 As at A Level and an average score of 54.4 was achieved in Attainment 8 scoring at GCSE level. In an article published in The Economist in November 2022, the improved GCSE results for Bangladeshi students were highlighted with no other ethnic group seeing the same level of improvement in the past two decade span.

Percentage of students getting at least 3 A grades at A level (2021/22)
Ethnic Group	%
Chinese	36.8
Indian	28.4
All ethnic groups (average)	23.1
Mixed	21.1
White	20.7
Bangladeshi	16.5
Pakistani	15.8
Black	12.3
Gypsy/Roma	2.2

Average GCSE Attainment 8 score (out of 90.0) (2021/22)
Ethnic group	Score
Chinese	66.1
Indian	61.3
Bangladeshi	54.4
Mixed	49.4
Pakistani	49.1
All ethnic groups (average)	48.8
Black	48.6
White	47.8
Gypsy/Roma	21.0

Percentage of pupils getting a grade 5 or above in English and maths GCSE (2021/22)
Ethnic group	%
Chinese	80.0
Indian	73.0
Bangladeshi	62.1
Pakistani	51.2
Mixed	49.9
All ethnic groups (average)	49.8
Black	49.4
White	47.9
Gypsy/Roma	8.5

=== Health ===
A survey in the 1990s on the visible communities in Britain by the Policy Studies Institute concluded that British Bangladeshis continue to be among the most severely disadvantaged. Bangladeshis had the highest rates of illness in the UK, in 2001. Bangladeshi men were three times as likely to visit their doctor as men in the general population. Bangladeshis also had the highest rates of people with disabilities, and were more likely to smoke than any other ethnic group, at a rate of 44% in 1999 in England. Smoking was very common amongst the men, but very few women smoked, perhaps due to cultural customs. Research suggests that British Bangladeshis need intervention to prevent diabetes at a body mass index (BMI) of 21, which is lower than the otherwise recommended threshold.

=== Housing ===
The average number of people living in each Bangladeshi household is 5, larger than all other ethnic groups. Households which contained a single person were 9%; houses containing a married couple were 54%, pensioner households were 2%. There were twice as many people per room as white households, with 43% living in homes with insufficient bedroom space. A third of Bangladeshi homes contain more than one family—64% of all overcrowded households in Tower Hamlets are Bangladeshi. The 2001 census for England and Wales found that only 37% of Bangladeshis owned households compared to 69% of the population, those with social rented tenure is 48%, the largest of which in Tower Hamlets (82%) and Camden (81%).

The 2021 United Kingdom census for England and Wales showed marginal improvement in ownership although Bangladeshis remained as one of the ethnicities with the lowest rates of outright home ownership, at only 9%. A further 30% owned their home with a mortgage, 27% privately rented and the remaining 34% of the Bangladeshi population lived in social housing – the only major Asian ethnicity to be more likely than the White British population to live in social housing.

=== Economics ===
British Bangladeshis are around three times more likely to be in poverty compared to their white counterparts, according to a 2015 report entitled 'Ethnic Inequalities' by the Centre for Social Investigation (CSI) at Nuffield College at University of Oxford. The research found that poverty rate is 46% of people of Bangladeshi background – compared with 16% for the white British in 2009–11. "Bangladeshi background are also more likely to have a limiting long-term illness or disability and to live in more crowded conditions," it noted.

Research from the Resolution Foundation published in 2020 has found that the ethnic group has the second lowest median family wealth per adult at £31,000 and the lowest mean family net wealth per adult at £88,000.

== Culture ==
=== Celebrations ===
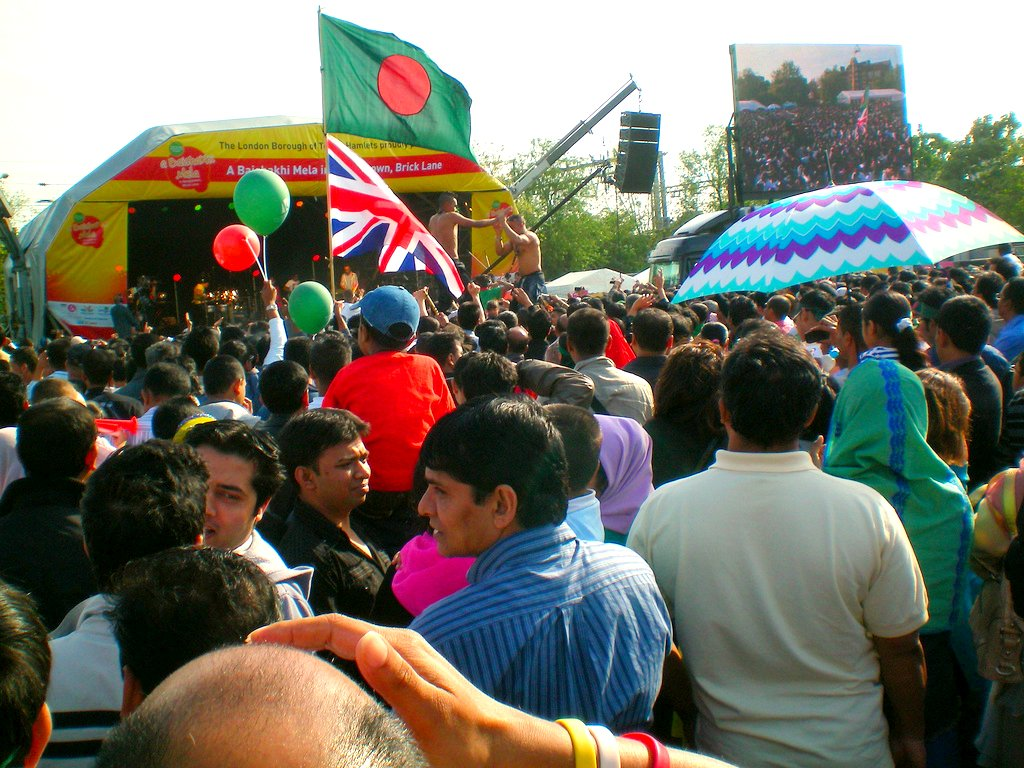
Crowds at the Boishakhi Mela in Bethnal Green, London

Significant Bengali events or celebrations are celebrated by the community annually. The Baishakhi Mela is a celebration of the Bengali New Year, celebrated by the Bengali community every year. Held each April–May since 1997 in London's Banglatown, it is the largest Asian open-air event in Europe, and the largest Bengali festival outside Bangladesh. In Bangladesh and West Bengal it is known as the Pohela Boishakh. The event is broadcast live across different continents; it features a funfair, music and dance displays on stages, with people dressed in colourful traditional clothes, in Weavers Field and Allen Gardens in Bethnal Green. The Mela is also designed to enhance the area's community identity, bringing together the best of Bengali culture. Brick Lane is the main destination where curry and Bengali spices are served throughout the day. As of 2009, the Mela was organised by the Tower Hamlets council, attracting 95,000 people, featuring popular artists such as Momtaz Begum, Nukul Kumar Bishwash, Mumzy Stranger and many others.

The Nowka Bais is a traditional boat racing competition. It was first brought to the United Kingdom in 2007 to commemorate the 1000th birthday of Oxfordshire. It has gained recognition and support from Queen Elizabeth II and others. Since 2015, it has been hosted in Birmingham, where it is the largest cultural event in the West Midlands and the largest boat race in Britain, attracting thousands of people.

=== Marriage ===
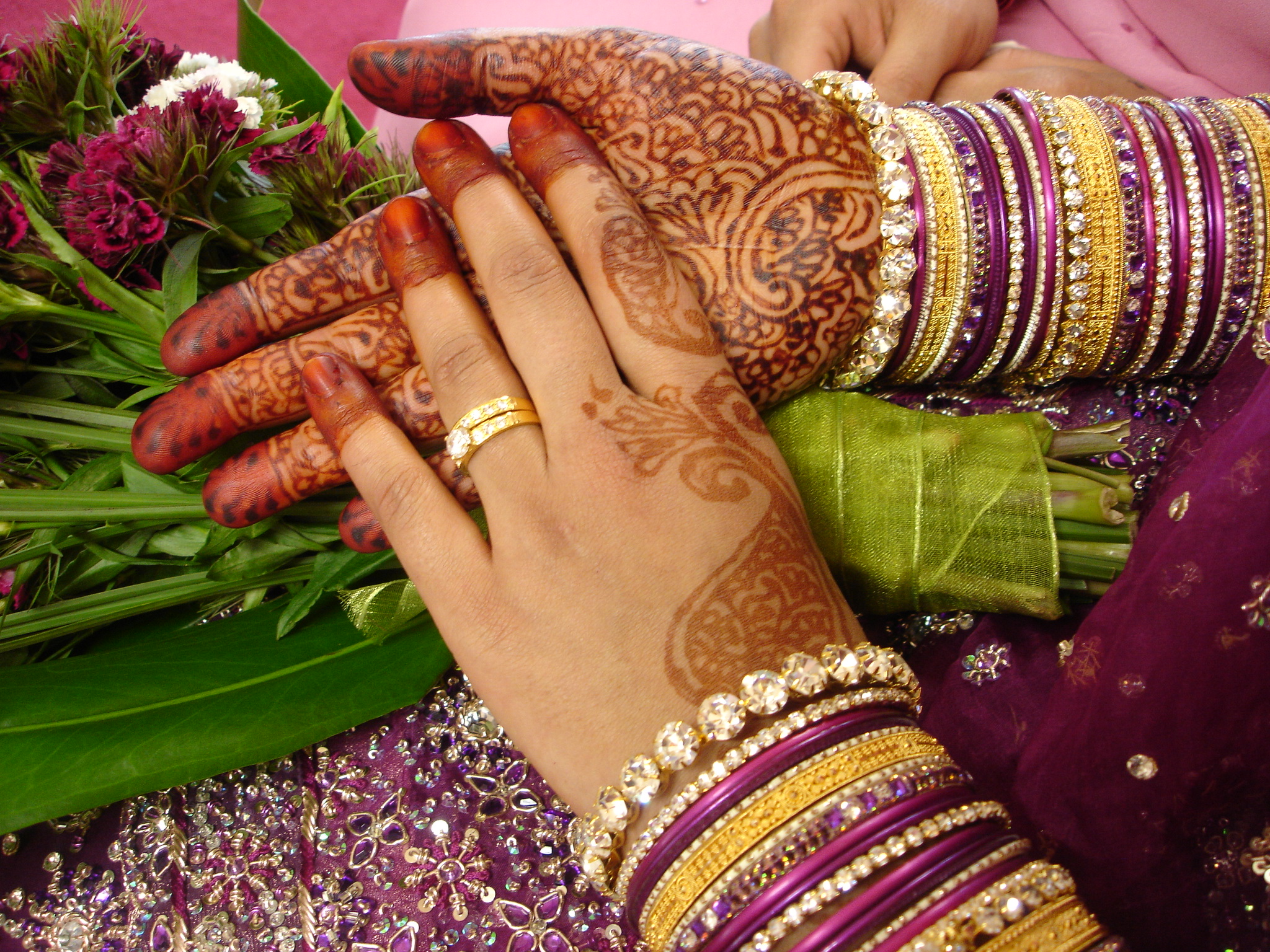
A bride in London with hands decorated with henna and bangles

Bangladeshi weddings are celebrated with a combination of Bengali and Muslim traditions, and play a large part in developing and maintaining social ties. Many marriages are between the British diaspora (Londonis) and the native-born Bangladeshis. Sometimes men will go to Bangladesh to get married, however recently more women are marrying in Bangladesh. Second or third generation Bangladeshis are more likely to get married in the UK within the British culture. However this exposure has created a division between preferences for arranged marriages or for love marriages. Tradition holds that the bride's family must buy the bridegroom's family a set of new furniture to be housed in the family home, with all original furniture given away or discarded. The average Bangladeshi outlay for a wedding is £30–60,000 for a single wedding, including decorations, venue, food, clothing and limousines, all areas in which there is competition between families.

==== Forced marriage ====
Forced marriages are rare; the British High Commission has been involved with many cases concerning on British citizens. Another media highlight includes a Bangladeshi-born National Health Service doctor Humayra Abedin. She was deceived by her parents after asking her to arrive at their home in Dhaka, a court ordered her parents to hand her over to the British High Commission. The commission has been reported to have handled 56 cases from April 2007 to March 2008. According to 2017 data by the Forced Marriage Unit (FMU), a joint effort between the Home Office and the Foreign and Commonwealth Office, of the 129 callers related to Bangladesh, 71% were female and 29% were male, 16% were under the age of 15 and another 12% were aged 16–17. The majority of the victims were likely in the 18-21 age group and the proportion of males were higher for Bangladeshis than other groups. However, Pakistan has the highest number of cases of forced marriage.

=== Cuisine ===
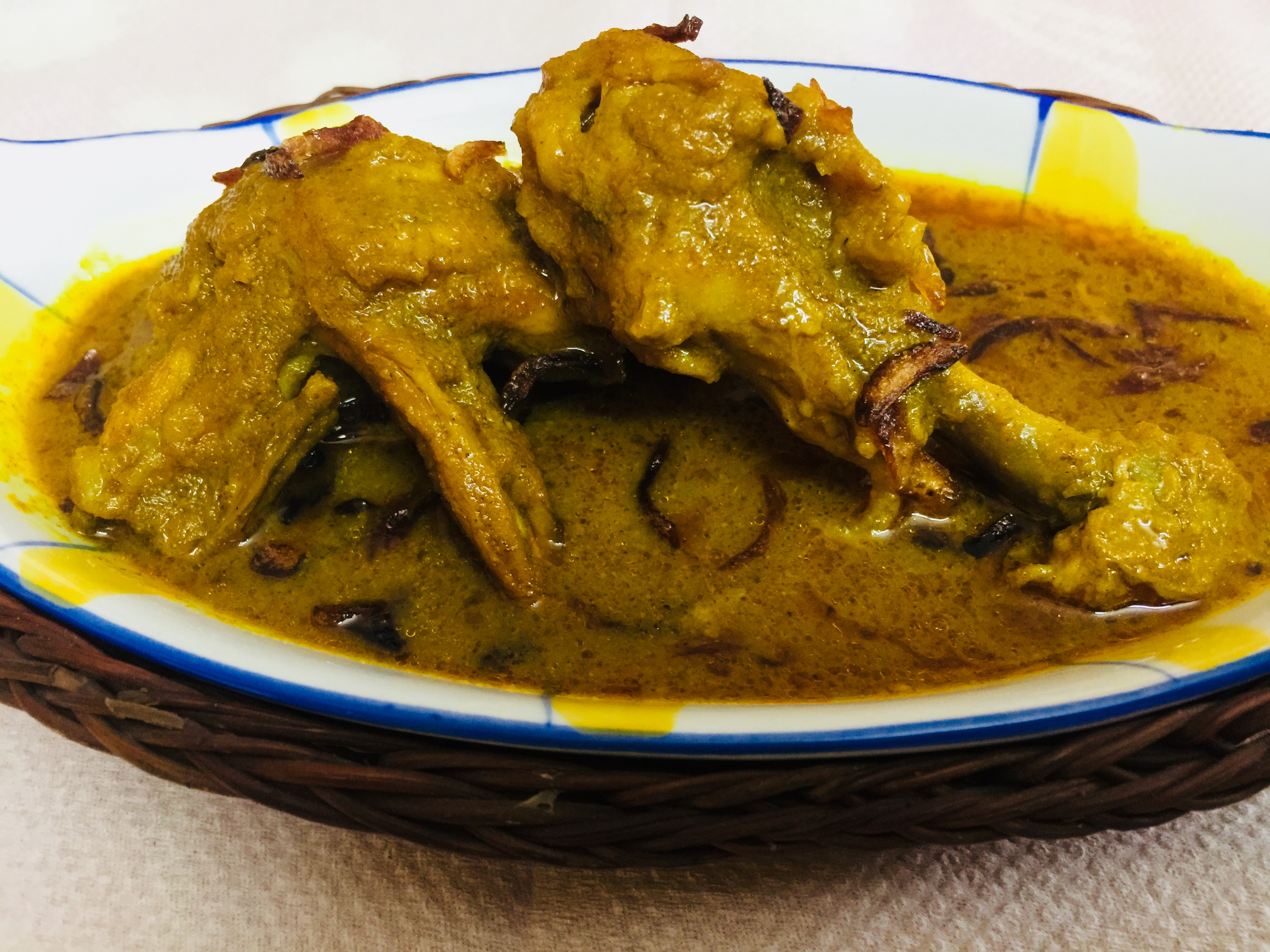
The Bangladeshi style chicken curry is famous among the British-Bangladeshi population

British Bangladeshis consume traditional Bangladeshi food, in particular rice with curry. Many traditional Bengali dishes are served with rice, including chicken, lentil (dahl), and fish. Another popular food is shatkora, which is a citrus and tangy fruit from Sylhet, mainly used for flavourings in curries. Bangladeshi cooking has become popular in Britain because of the number of Bangladeshi-owned restaurants, which has increased significantly. In 1946, there were 20 restaurants, while in 2015 there are 8,200 owned by Bangladeshis, out of a total of 9,500 Indian restaurants in the UK. In 2019, it was estimated in a BBC report that approximately 87% of all Indian restaurants in the country were run and owned by Bangladeshis.

British Bangladeshis have made a number of recent contributions to the culinary heritage of inner-city London. Drawing on the kebab culture introduced to the city by its Turkish and Kurdish population, as well as the city's chicken shop culture, British Bangladeshis have invented dishes such as naga doner, shatkora doner and naga wings. These fusion dishes are popular with South Asian Londoners, particularly in the East End.

=== Media ===
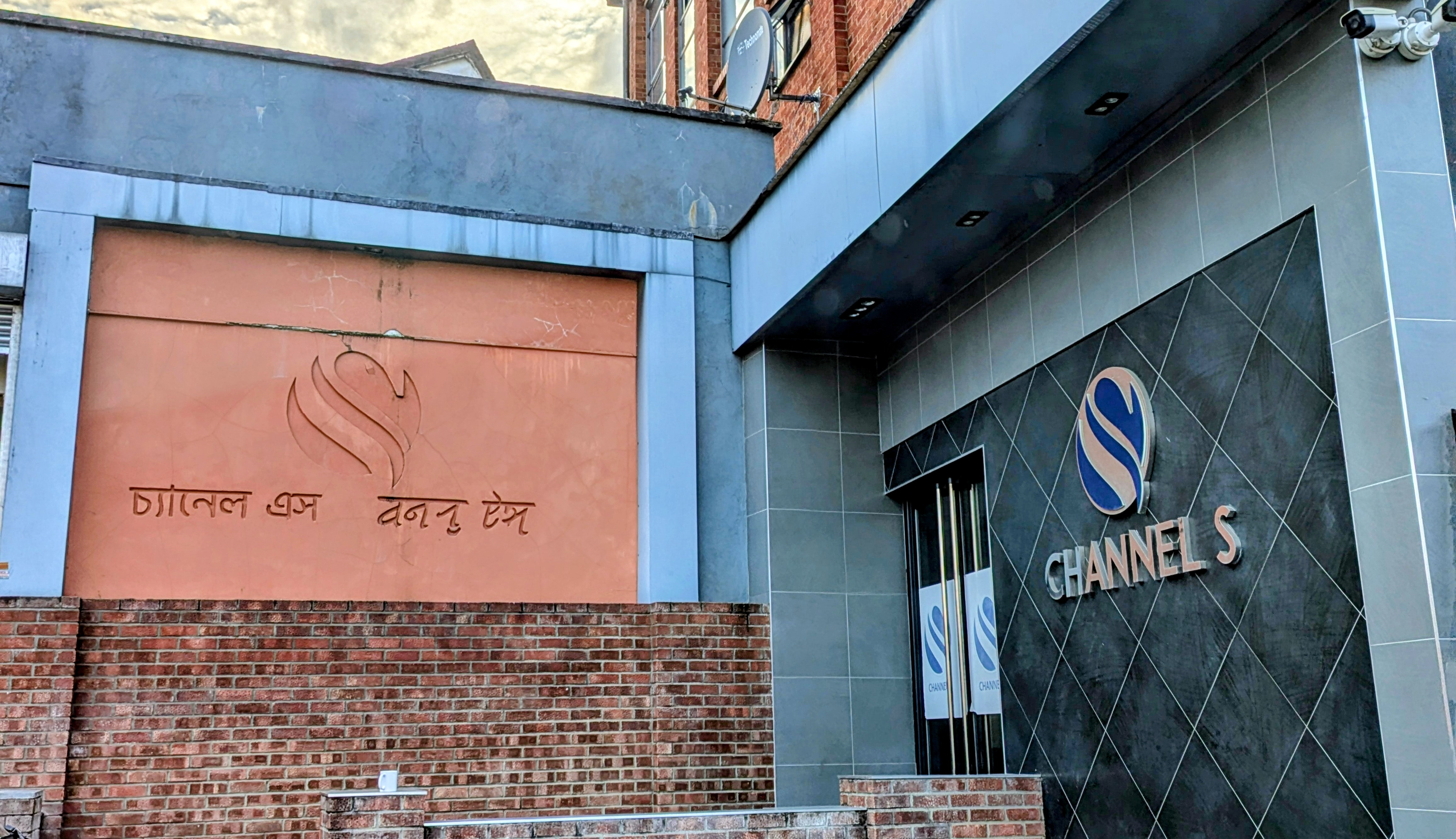
"Channel S" studios in Walthamstow, London. "Channel S" is one of the popular British Bangladeshi channels.

There are several Bangladeshi channels available on satellite television in Britain, most prominent of these include Channel S, NTV, and ATN Bangla. Bengali newspapers have been increasing within the community, most prominent of these include Potrika, Janomot, Surma News Group and Bangla Post. The first international film based on a story about British Bangladeshis was Brick Lane (2007), based on the novel by author Monica Ali, her book is about a woman who moves to London from rural Bangladesh, with her husband, wedded in an arranged marriage. The film was critically acclaimed and the novel was an award-winning best seller. The film however caused some controversy within the community. Other films created in the community are mainly based on the struggles which British Bangladeshis face such as drugs and presenting a culture clash. These dramas include Shopner Desh (2006) – a story related to the culture clashes. In 2020, BBC Four released an episode of A Very British History focusing on the history of British Bangladeshis and Bangladeshi emigration to the United Kingdom from the 1960s onwards, hosted by Dr Aminul Hoque.

=== Festivals ===
Religious Muslim festivals are celebrated by the community each year including Eid al-Adha and Eid ul-Fitr. Muslims dress for the occasion in traditionally Bangladeshi style clothing. Children are given clothing or money. Eid prayers are attended by large numbers of men. Relatives, friends, and neighbours visit and exchange Bengali food and sweets such as Shemai, Handesh, Nunbora, Chotpoti, Pulao, Biryani, etc. In the evening, young people will often spend the remaining time socialising with friends. Some, however, will go "cruising" – travelling across cities in expensive hired cars, playing loud music and sometimes waving the Bangladesh flag. Sociologists suggest these British Bangladeshi boys and girls have reinterpreted the older, more traditional practice of their faith and culture. One of the largest Eid congregations are held by Bengalis in London, in places like the East London Mosque. The Eid al-Adha is celebrated after Hajj, to commemorate the prophet Ibrahim's compliance to sacrifice his son Isma'il. Traditionally, an animal has to be sacrificed, and its meat distributed among family, friends, and the poor as zakat (charity). In the UK, however, people usually purchase the meat from specialised shops. Instead of distributing meat, some donate to mosques, or remit money to Bangladesh for the purchase of cows for sacrifice and distribution there.

== Society ==
=== Notables ===
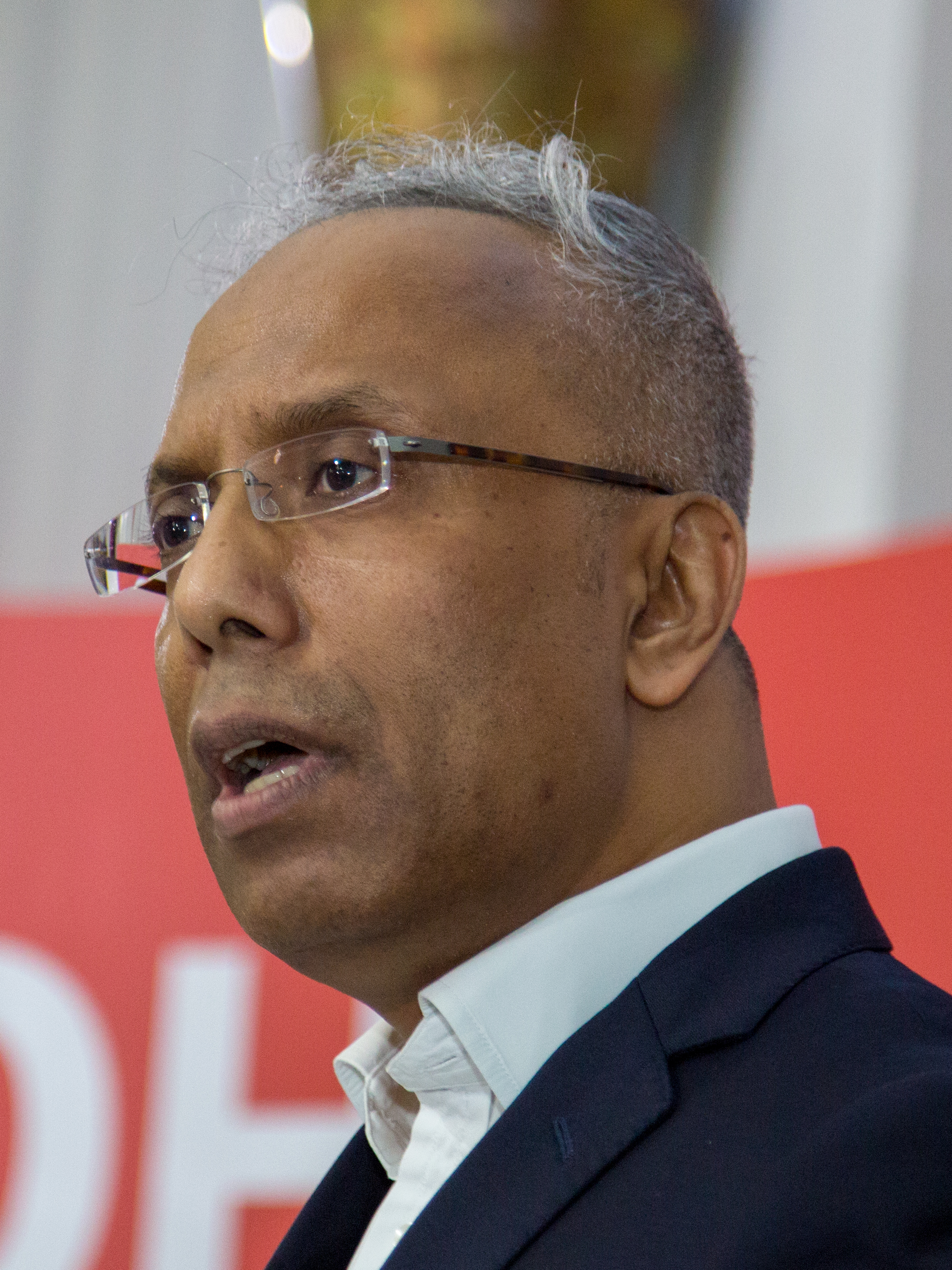
Lutfur Rahman, the first executive Muslim and Bangladeshi mayor in the UK

Rushanara Ali is the first person of Bangladeshi origin to have been elected as a member of parliament during the 2010 general election for the Labour Party from the constituency of Bethnal Green and Bow, winning by a large majority of more than 10,000. Tulip Siddiq became a member of parliament in the 2015 general election, getting elected from Camden Town. Siddiq is the niece of the former Prime Minister of Bangladesh, Sheikh Hasina and granddaughter of Sheikh Mujibur Rahman. Baroness Uddin was the first Bangladeshi and Muslim woman to enter the House of Lords; she swore the oath of office in her own faith. Anwar Choudhury became the British High Commissioner for Bangladesh in 2004, the first non-white British person to be appointed in a senior diplomatic post. Lutfur Rahman is the first directly elected mayor of Tower Hamlets, who was later removed from office for breaching electoral rules. Though he was subsequently reelected in the 2022 council election.

Enam Ali became the first Muslim and the first representative of the British curry industry to be granted Freedom of the City of London in recognition of his contribution to the Indian hospitality industry. Dr. Muhammad Abdul Bari is the chairman of the Muslim Council of Britain – the largest Muslim organisation in Britain. Murad Qureshi, a Labour politician, is a member of the Greater London Assembly.

Others have contributed in the British media and business worlds. Konnie Huq is the longest-serving female presenter on Blue Peter, a BBC television programme for children. Other notable national TV presenters have included Lisa Aziz of Sky News, Nina Hossain (ITV and BBC London), Tasmin Lucia Khan (BBC News) and Shawkat Hashmi is Community Editor at BBC Sheffield, (BBC News). In drama, Shefali Chowdhury and Afshan Azad both starred in the Harry Potter movies as Parvati and Padma Patil. Mumzy is an R&B and hip-hop music artist, the first Bangladeshi to release a music single. Syed Ahmed is a businessman and also a television star, well known for being a candidate on The Apprentice. There are many other entrepreneurs, including the late Abdul Latif, known for his dish "Curry Hell"; Iqbal Ahmed, placed at number 511 on the Sunday Times Rich List 2006, and celebrity chef Tommy Miah. Rizwan Hussain is also very well known for presenting Islamic and charity shows on Channel S and Islam Channel, mainly known within the community.

Artists include fashion designer and artist Rahemur Rahman, dancer and choreographer Akram Khan, pianist Zoe Rahman, vocalist Suzana Ansar and Sohini Alam (born 1978), and the visual artist on film and photography Runa Islam.

Notable authors who have received praise for their books include Zia Haider Rahman whose debut novel In the Light of What We Know was published in 2014, Ed Husain, who wrote the book The Islamist on account of his experience for five years with the Hizb ut-Tahrir, Monica Ali for her book Brick Lane a story based on a Bangladeshi woman, and Kia Abdullah for her book, Life, Love and Assimilation.

Large numbers of people from the Bangladeshi community have also been involved with local government, increasingly in the London boroughs of Tower Hamlets and Camden. The majority of the councillors in Tower Hamlets are of Bangladeshi descent and part of the Labour Party. As of 2009, 32 of the total 51 councillors were Bangladeshi (63%), 18 were White (35%) and 1 Somali (2%). The first Bangladeshi mayor in the country was Ghulam Murtuza in Tower Hamlets. Camden has appointed many Bangladeshis as mayors since the first, Nasim Ali. The London Borough of Islington followed suit in the year 2012; appointing councillor Jilani Chowdhury as their mayor.

==== Sports ====
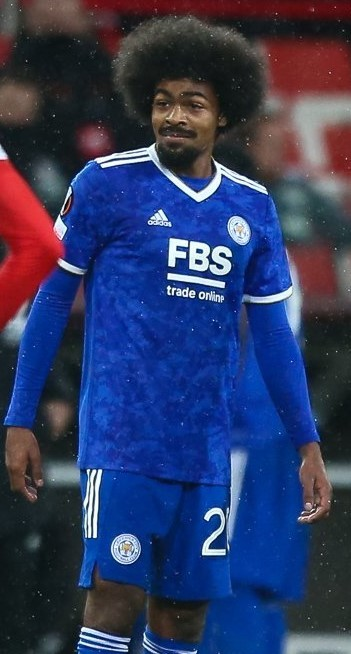
Hamza Choudhury the first player of Bengali descent to play in the Premier League.

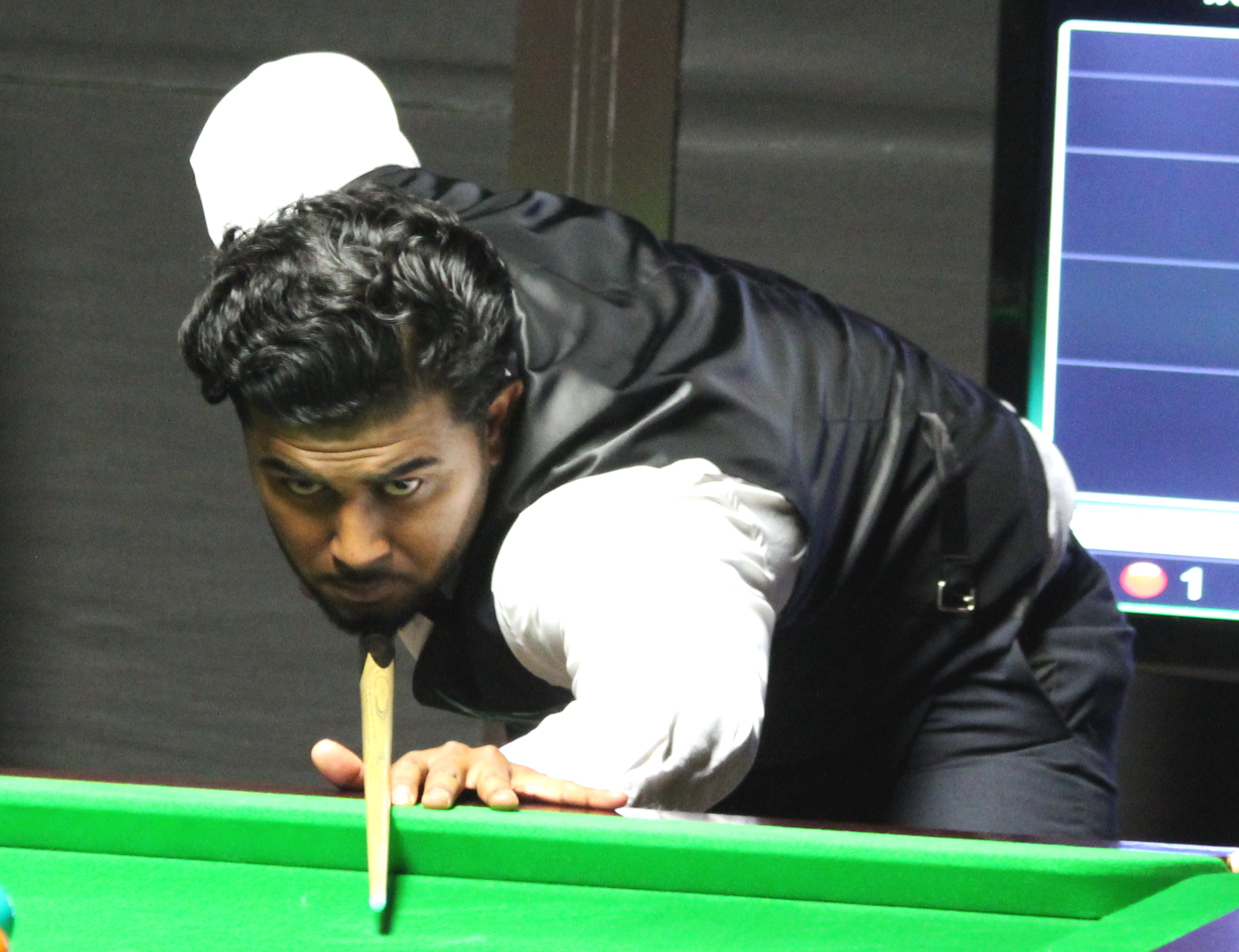
Hammad Miah is a professional snooker player of Bangladeshi origin.

Anwar Uddin was the first notable British Bangladeshi footballer to achieve notability. He began his career at West Ham United, where he joined the winning team of the 1999 FA Youth Cup Finals. In May 2015, he was appointed manager of Sporting Bengal United. Hamza Choudhury currently plays for Leicester City F.C., making him the first player of Bengali descent to play in the Premier League, and he has also made appearances for the England under-21 team.

British Bangladeshis have also engaged themselves in other sports like cricket, snooker and badminton. Bulbul Hussain of Whitechapel is a wheelchair rugby player of Bengali origin, and he has been a part of the Great Paralympic Team since 2008.

In 2012, British kickboxing champion Ruqsana Begum was among the nine people of Bangladeshi descent who carried the Olympic torch along with some 8,000 Britons across the UK. Architectural and graphic designer Saiman Miah was the designer for the two commemorative £5 coins released by British Royal Mint to mark the 2012 London Olympic Games. Akram Khan was a choreographer of the Olympic opening ceremony. Khan was in direction when 12,000 dance artistes performed in the Olympic opening ceremony. Enam Ali's Le Raj restaurant was selected as one of the official food suppliers of the London Olympics. The restaurant also prepared and provided Iftar to the Muslim guests at the Olympics.

=== Political identity ===
In Bangladeshi politics there are two groups, favouring different principles, one Islamic and the other secular. Between these groups, there has always been rivalry; however, the Islamic faction is steadily growing. This division between religious and secular was an issue during the Bangladesh Liberation War; the political history of Bangladesh is now being re-interpreted again, in the UK. The secular group show nationalism through monuments, or through the introduction of Bengali culture, and the Islamic group mainly through dawah.

One symbol of Bengali nationalism is the Shaheed Minar, which commemorates the Bengali Language Movement, present in Altab Ali Park – the park is also the main venue for rallies and demonstrations, and also in Westwood, Oldham. The monuments are a smaller replica of the one in Dhaka, Bangladesh, and symbolises a mother and the martyred sons. Nationalism is mainly witnessed during celebrations of the mela, when groups such as the Swadhinata Trust try to promote Bengali history and heritage amongst young people, in schools, youth clubs and community centres.

According to a 2013 survey by the Center on Dynamics of Ethnicity (CoDE) at the University of Manchester, ethnic minorities in the country were more likely to describe themselves as exclusively "British" than their white British counterparts. 72% of Bangladeshis reported an exclusive "British" identity, in contrast 72% of white Britons preferred to call themselves "English" rather than the more expansive "British" designation. A 2009 study by the University of Surrey suggested that some Bangladeshis in Britain, particularly the youth, embrace their "Britishness" while feeling alienated from "Englishness". The underlying assumption was that "Englishness" was associated with "whiteness" whereas "Britishness" denoted a more universal kind of identity that encompasses various cultural and racial backgrounds.

=== Youth gangs ===
As a response to conditions faced by their first generation elders during the 1970s (see history), younger Bangladeshis started to form gangs, developing a sense of dominating their territory. One consequence of this was that Bangladeshi gangs began fighting each other. Bangladeshi teenagers involved with gangs show their allegiance to this kind of lifestyle in various ways: heavily styled hair, expensive mobile phones and fashionable labels and brands. Teenage street gangs have been responsible for sometimes lethal violence; it is estimated that in Tower Hamlets alone there are 2,500 Bengali youths affiliated to one of the many local gangs, and that 26 out of the 27 gangs in the area are Bangladeshi. The notorious gangs have been given names that end with massive or posse, such as the Brick Lane Massive and Brady Street Massive. Other smaller groups include the Shadwell Crew, Cannon Street Posse, Bengal Tigers and Bethnal Green Boys.

In the past, Bangladeshi gangs have fostered criminal elements, including low level drug use and credit card fraud. However, for many the focus has changed to fighting over their territories. They use a variety of weapons, such as samurai swords, machetes, kitchen knives and meat cleavers, although guns are rarely used. When members reach their twenties they usually grow out of gang membership, but some move on to more serious criminal activity. Increasing numbers of Bangladeshi youths are taking hard drugs, in particular heroin. Islamic fundamentalism has also played a part in the youth culture, illustrated by the efforts of one Brick Lane gang to oust prostitutes from the area. As to dietary customs, youths generally avoid eating pork, and some from drinking alcohol; however, many take part in recreational drug use, in particular heroin.

== Business ==
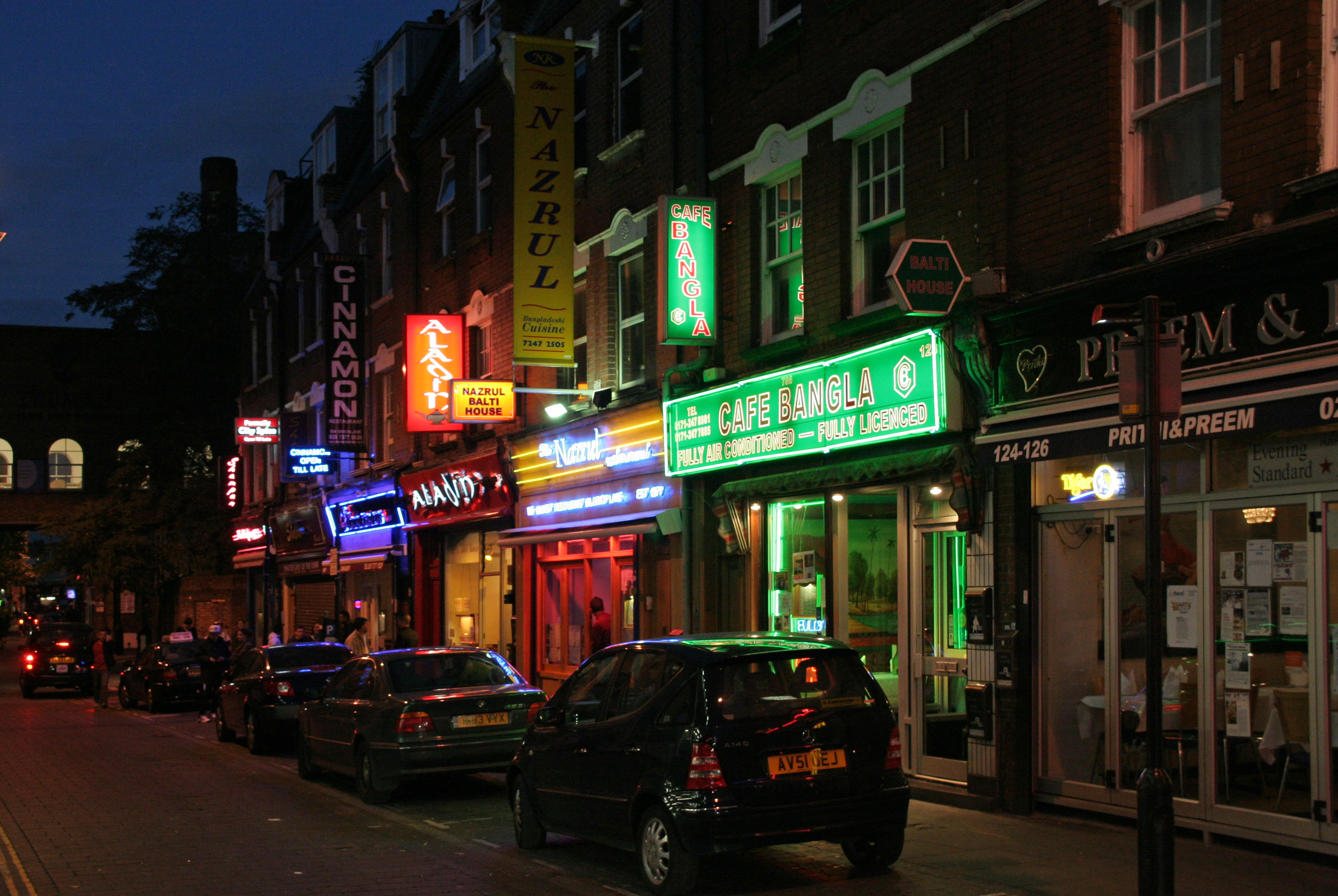
Bangladeshi-owned Indian restaurants in Brick Lane.

95% of all South Asian restaurants are run by Bangladeshis. The curry industry employs over 150,000 people, contributes £4.5 billion to the economy each year and is viewed as recognition of Bangladeshi success, through awards such as 'The British Curry Awards'. Brick Lane, known as Banglatown, is home to many of these restaurants, and is now regarded as London's 'curry capital', with thousands of visitors every day. The restaurants serve different types of curry dishes, including fish, chutneys, and other halal dishes. Attitudes towards restaurant work has shifted among second-generation Bangladeshis who lack interest in working in the curry industry due to their social mobility and opportunities provided by their parents. As of 2016, according to the Bangladesh High Commission, Brick Lane has 57 Bangladeshi-owned curry houses, and in England as a whole, around 90% of all curry houses are owned by British Bangladeshis.

Although the curry industry has been the primary business of Bangladeshis (see Cuisine), many other Bangladeshis own grocery stores. Whitechapel is a thriving local street market, offering many low-priced goods for the local Bengali community. In Brick Lane there are many Bengali staples available, such as frozen fish and jack fruits. There are also many travel agents offering flights to Sylhet. Many Bangladeshi businesses located in the East End wish to maintain a link with Sylhet, for example the Weekly Sylheter Dak or the Sylhet Stores. There are also many money transfer companies; in 2007, a firm called First Solution Money Transfer went into liquidation. Company chairman, Dr Fazal Mahmood, admitted the business owed hundreds of thousands of pounds to the public. and claimed that the firm had lost control of the money it handled due to a lack of regulation. Other large companies include Seamark and IBCO, owned by millionaire Iqbal Ahmed, Taj Stores, and many others.

In 2004, Guild of Bangladeshi Restaurateurs requested for ethnic restaurant staff positions to be designated as a shortage occupation, which would make it easier for Bangladeshi citizens to obtain UK work permits. In 2008, Guild of Bangladeshi Restaurateurs members raised concerns that many restaurants were under threat because the British Government announced a change in immigration laws which could block entry of high skilled chefs from Bangladesh to the UK. They requested that the Government recognises that they are skilled workers. The law demanded these workers speak fluent English, and have good formal qualifications. However, these changes did not take place.

Immigration policy changes has made it more difficult to source skilled workers from abroad, resulting in a paucity of chefs with the culinary skills to run an Indian-style kitchen. The situation has worsened due to a yearly salary minimum of £35,000 applied to tier 2 migrants, or skilled workers with a job offer in the UK, coming into effect April 2016. The Government's cap on skilled-workers from outside the EU means chefs must earn this salary a year to be permitted to work in UK restaurants. A Government scheme set up in 2012 to train UK nationals to work as chefs in Asian and Oriental restaurants struggled with a lack of interest, despite a YouGov poll at the time indicating that almost a third of young people would consider working in the sector. Experts say curry houses are closing down at the rate of two a week because of a shortage of tandoori chefs.

The UK is also the third single largest export destination for Bangladesh and Britain has the largest Bengali population outside of Bangladesh and West Bengal.

=== Remittance ===
The UK is the second biggest foreign investor in Bangladesh and one of the largest development partners of Bangladesh. Over 240 UK companies are operating in different sectors including retail, banking, energy, infrastructure, consultancy and education with leading centres of operation in Dhaka, Chittagong and Sylhet.

Many British Bangladeshis send money to Bangladesh to build houses. In villages in Sylhet, there are houses built suburbs or communities through financial support mainly received from the UK, fuelling a building boom. Businesses have also been established by the British expatriates in the city of Sylhet, such as hotels, restaurants, often themed on those found in London, have also been established to cater to the visiting Sylheti expatriate population and the growing Sylheti middle classes (i.e. London Fried Chicken or Tessco). The financial relationship between British Bengalis and relatives in Bangladesh has changed, only 20% of Bangladeshi families in east London were sending money to Bangladesh as of 1995, this figure was approximately 85% during 1960–1970s. For a large number of families in Britain the cost of living, housing, or education for the children severely constrains any regular financial commitment towards Bangladesh. Moreover, the family reunion process has resulted in the social and economic reproduction of the household in Britain; conflicts over land or money can arise involving the mutual or reciprocal relationship between members of a joint household divided by migration. This, in turn, can reduce even more the level of investment in Sylhet. The emergence of a second and a third generation of British Bangladeshis is another factor explaining the declining proportion of people's income being sent as remittances to Bangladesh. About 7% of all remittance sent to Bangladesh are from Britain as of 2019. As of January 2020, $1175m is sent from UK to Bangladesh per year.

British Airways withdrew from Dhaka Airport in 2009 and there is communal demand for return but not enough MP support.

== See also ==
- Bangladesh–United Kingdom relations
- Bangladeshi diaspora
- Bengali people
- British Indians
- British Pakistanis
- British Sri Lankans
- East Asians in the United Kingdom
- History of Bangladeshis in the United Kingdom
- List of Bangladeshi people
- List of Bangladesh-related topics
- List of Bengalis
- List of British Bangladeshis
- List of British Muslims
