= List of British Bangladeshis =

This is a list of notable British Bangladeshis (Bengali: উল্লেখযোগ্য বিলাতী বাংলাদেশীদের তালিকা). This includes Bangladeshi immigrants settled or residing in the United Kingdom and British-born citizens of Bangladeshi national origin.

Successful members from the community are recognised in the annual BritBangla, British Bangladeshi Who's Who and British Bangladeshi Power & Inspiration 100 for their significant work, contribution and achievements in British society.

== Business ==
- Abdul Latif – Restaurateur known for his dish "Curry Hell".
- Aktar Islam – Restaurateur, curry chef and businessman. In 2010, his restaurant Lasan won the Best Local Restaurant category on Channel 4's The F Word. In 2011, he won the Central regional heat to reach the final of the BBC Two series Great British Menu.
- Aref Karim – Accountant and hedge fund manager. In 1995, he founded Quality Capital Management (QCM), which has assets in the region of £150 million according to the Sunday Times Rich List.
- Atique Choudhury – Businessman whose restaurant Yum Yum is Europe's largest Thai restaurant.
- Ayub Ali Master – One of the first Bengali restaurateurs, founder of the Shah Jalal Restaurant which became a hub for the British Asian community.
- Bajloor Rashid MBE – Businessman and former president of the Bangladesh Caterers Association.
- Enam Ali MBE – Restaurateur and businessman. In 2005, he founded The British Curry Awards. He is also the founder, publisher and editor of Spice Business Magazine.
- Foysol Choudhury MBE MSP – Businessman, community activist and Chairman of Edinburgh and Lothians Regional Equality Council.
- Iqbal Ahmed OBE – Entrepreneur, and chairman and chief executive of Seamark Group. In 2006, he became the highest British Bangladeshi to feature on the Sunday Times Rich List (listed at number 511). He has a net worth of $250 million.
- Iqbal Wahhab OBE – Entrepreneur, restaurateur, journalist and publisher. He founded Tandoori Magazine and multi-award-winning restaurant Cinnamon Club.
- Jobeda Ali – Social entrepreneur, documentary filmmaker and chief executive of Three Sisters Care. In 2010, she won the Social Business Leader award at Ogunte Women's Social Leadership Awards.
- Leepu Nizamuddin Awlia – Car engineer, designer and coachbuilder, who builds imitation supercars out of old models in a workshop on Discovery Channel's reality television programme Bangla Bangers/Chop Shop: London Garage.
- Mahee Ferdous Jalil – Businessman, founder of Channel S, owner of Prestige Auto Group and television presenter.
- Mamun Chowdhury – Businessman, and founder and co-director of London Tradition. In 2014, the company was awarded a Queen's Award for Enterprise for International Trade in recognition of its increase in sales.
- Muquim Ahmed – Entrepreneur who became the first Bangladeshi millionaire at the age of 26 due to diversification in banking, travel, a chain of restaurants with the Cafe Naz group, publishing and property development.
- Ragib Ali – Industrialist, pioneer tea-planter, educationalist, philanthropist and banker who has a net worth of $250 million.
- Sabirul Islam – Author, entrepreneur and motivational speaker. He has written three self-help books and developed a board game. Since 2011, he has spoken at over 700 events worldwide as part of his Inspire1Million campaign.
- Shelim Hussain MBE – Entrepreneur, and founder, chairman and managing director of Euro Foods (UK).
- Siraj Ali – Restaurateur and philanthropist. In 2011, he was awarded the British Bangladeshi Who's Who "Outstanding Contribution Award" for his long standing contribution to the hospitality and catering industry.
- Syed Ahmed – Entrepreneur, businessman and television personality. He is best known for being a candidate on series two of BBC reality television programme The Apprentice in 2006.
- Mohammad Ajman "Tommy" Miah MBE – Celebrity chef and restaurateur. In 1991, he founded the Indian Chef of the Year Competition.
- Waliur Rahman Bhuiyan OBE – Managing Director and Country Head of BOC Bangladesh Limited.

== Broadcast media ==
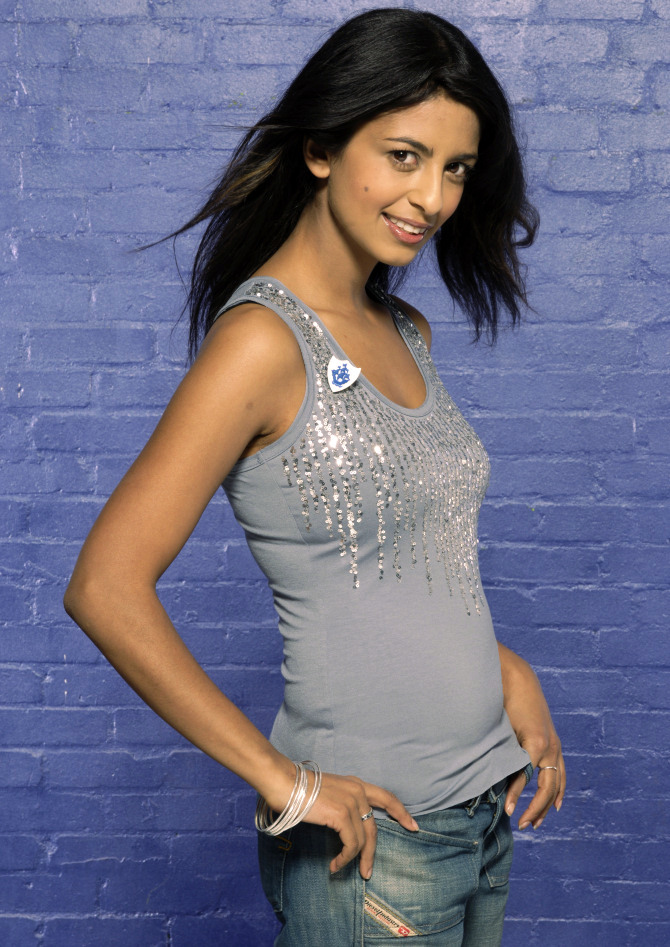
Former Blue Peter presenter, Konnie Huq

- Ajmal Masroor – Television presenter, politician and Imam. He was the Liberal Democrats Parliamentary candidate for Bethnal Green and Bow constituency in the 2010 general election. He is a television presenter on political and Islamic programmes on Islam Channel and Channel S.
- Ali Shahalom – Comedian who hosts his own YouTube channel called Aliofficial1 with comedy sketches. Since 2014, he has hosted The Variety Show on Channel S.
- Fazle Lohani – Journalist, writer, television presenter and filmmaker. He was best known as the presenter of variety television programme Jodi Kichhu Mone Na Koren.
- Hasina Momtaz – News presenter for Channel i Europe and previously for NTV Europe, and former press officer for the Mayor of London between 2003 and 2011.
- Kanak "Konnie" Huq – Television presenter best known for being the longest-serving female Blue Peter presenter.
- Lisa Aziz – News presenter and journalist, best known as the co-presenter of the Bristol-based ITV West Country nightly weekday news programme The West Tonight, and as one of the first Asian presenters to be seen on television. In 2004, she won the Ethnic Multicultural Media Academy's Best Television News Journalist Award.
- Nadia Ali – Television and radio presenter. Since 2012, she has presented the live Bengali show on Sunday nights for BBC Asian Network.
- Nadiya Hussain – Columnist and television personality best known for winning series six of BBC baking competition programme The Great British Bake Off in 2015.
- Nina Hossain – Journalist, newscaster and sole presenter of ITV London's regional news programme ITV News London.
- Nurul Islam – Broadcast journalist, radio producer and presenter. He is best remembered for his work with the BBC World Service.
- Reshmin Chowdhury – Sports journalist and broadcaster. Since 2010, she has broadcast as a sports presenter for the BBC News Channel and BBC World News. In 2015, she won the Media Award at the Asian Football Awards.
- Rizwan Hussain – Television presenter, philanthropist, international humanitarian aid worker, barrister, and former Hindi music singer and producer. He presents Islamic and charity programmes on Channel S and Islam Channel.
- Shafik Rehman – Journalist, political analyst, and writer, who is best known for introducing Valentine's Day in Bangladesh.
- Syed Neaz Ahmad – Academic, writer, journalist, columnist and critic. He is best known for anchoring NTV Europe current affairs talk show Talking Point.
- Tasmin Lucia-Khan – Journalist, presenter and producer. She is best known for delivering BBC Three's nightly hourly "World News" bulletins on 60 Seconds and presenting E24 on the rolling news channel BBC News. She currently delivers news bulletins and breaking stories on ITV breakfast television programme Daybreak.

== Finance ==
- Helal Miah – Investment analyst at The Share Centre. His tips for how to invest have appeared in The Sunday Times and numerous investment blogs.
- Moorad Choudhry – Managing Director, Head of Business Treasury and Global Banking & Markets at Royal Bank of Scotland plc.
- Sultan Choudhury OBE – Banker, chartered accountant and chief executive officer of Al Rayan Bank (formerly Islamic Bank of Britain).
- Waliur Rahman - Former Banker and Financial Services Director. He is now a Board Advisor and NED. Is an award winning founder of Property Sourcing Solutions, helping with building wealth through UK property.

== Journalism ==
- Abdul Gaffar Choudhury – Writer, journalist and columnist for Bengali newspapers in Bangladesh. He is best known for his lyrics on "Amar Bhaier Rokte Rangano" in 1952, which is the most widely celebrated song commemorating the Bengali language movement.
- Ash Sarkar – British journalist and political activist, currently a Contributing Editor at Novara Media.
- Fareena Alam – Former editor of British Muslim magazine Q News. She was named Media Professional of the Year by Islamic Relief in 2005 and at the Asian Women of Achievement Awards in 2006.
- Rejina Sabur-Cross – Food writer and blogger.
- Sarwar Ahmed – Publisher best known for founding Eastern Eye in 1989. He is the publisher of Asiana and Asiana Wedding. In 2013, he was awarded the Services to Media award at the British Muslim Awards.
- A. N. M. Serajur Rahman – Journalist and broadcaster. From 1960 to 1994, he worked for BBC World Service, and was the deputy chief of BBC Bangla Service before retirement.
- Shamim Chowdhury – Television and print journalist for Al Jazeera English.
- Shelina Begum – Journalist and editor of Asian News. In 2006, she was named North West Journalist of the Year at the British Nuclear Fuels-sponsored press wards.
- Syed Nahas Pasha – Journalist and editor-in-chief of Janomot and Curry Life.

== Politics ==
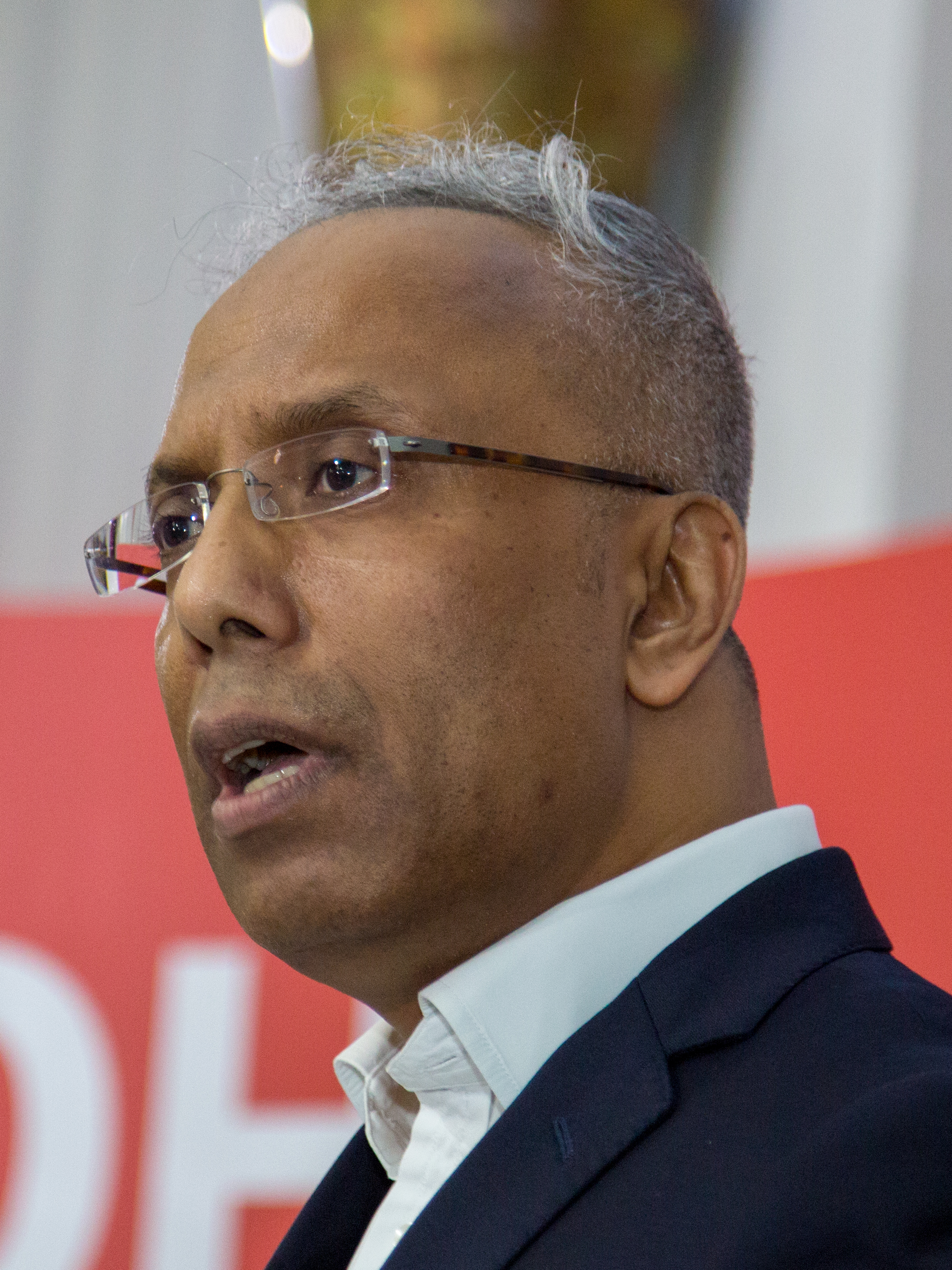
Mayor Lutfur Rahman.

=== Ministers ===
- Rushanara Ali MP – former Junior minister of State for Homelessness and Democracy and Member of Parliament for Bethnal Green and Bow.
- Tulip Siddiq MP – former Economic Secretary to the Treasury and City Minister and Member of Parliament for Hampstead and Kilburn, former councillor for Regent's Park ward and Cabinet Member for Culture and Communities in Camden.

=== Members of Parliament ===
- Apsana Begum MP – Labour Party Member of Parliament for Poplar and Limehouse, first Hijabi to be elected as an MP for the British parliament.
- Rupa Huq MP – Labour Party Member of Parliament for Ealing Central and Acton, and former Deputy Mayor of the London Borough of Ealing.
- Foysol Choudhury MBE MSP – Labour Party Member of Scottish Parliament for the Lothian region. He is the first British Bangladeshi to be elected as a Member of Scottish Parliament as well as being a businessman, community activist and Chairman of Edinburgh and Lothians Regional Equality Council.

=== Life peers ===
- Baroness "Pola" Manzila Uddin – Labour Party life peer, community activist, and the first Muslim and second Asian woman to sit in the House of Lords.

=== Mayors ===
- Forhad Hussain - Mayor of Newham.
- Lutfur Rahman – first directly elected mayor of Tower Hamlets and the first Bangladeshi leader of a local government.
- Mohammed Asaduzzaman - mayor of Brighton and Hove
- Nadia Shah – Ceremonial Mayor of Camden. In May 2016, she became the first female mayor in the United Kingdom of Bangladeshi origin.
- Nasim Ali OBE – Cabinet Member for Young People in Camden Council and former ceremonial Mayor of Camden. In 2003, at the age of 34, he became UK's youngest mayor as well as the first Bangladeshi and first Muslim mayor.

=== Local ===
- Luthfur Rahman OBE – Labour Party politician, councillor in the City of Manchester and Executive Member for Skills, Culture and Leisure in Manchester City Council. In 2008, he became the first person of Bengali origin to be elected a councillor on Manchester City Council.
- Abjol Miah – Politician, Liberal Democrats, former chairman of the Respect Party and former councillor for Shadwell ward. In 2010, he stood as the Respect parliamentary candidate in Bethnal Green and Bow constituency at the 2010 general election.
- Farida Anwar – Labour Party politician, councillor for Headington Hill and Northway in Oxford City Council. In 2014, she became Oxfordshire's first city councillor from a Bangladeshi background.
- Murad Qureshi – Labour Party politician and former Greater London Assembly Member.
- Rabina Khan – Liberal Democrat councillor for Shadwell ward, former Cabinet Member for Housing in Tower Hamlets London Borough Council, community worker and author of Ayesha's Rainbow.
- Syeda Khatun MBE – Labour Party politician, councillor for Tipton Green in the Sandwell Metropolitan Borough Council and Cabinet Advisor for Education. In 1999, she was the first Bangladeshi woman to be elected in the Midlands.
- Shafiqur Rahaman Chowdhury – Politician

== Public policy and leadership ==
- Abul Fateh – Diplomat and statesman. He was the first Foreign Secretary of Bangladesh after independence in 1971.
- Anwar Choudhury – British High Commissioner for Bangladesh between 2004 and 2008. He was the first non-white British person to be appointed in a senior diplomatic post. He is currently the Director of International Institutions at the Foreign & Commonwealth Office.
- Aftab Ali, founder of the All-India Seamen's Federation, helped thousands of British Asians to migrate, settle and find employment in Britain.
- Asif Ahmad CMG – British Diplomat who served as the British Ambassador to Thailand from November 2010 until August 2012. Since July 2013, he has been British Ambassador to the Philippines.
- Dia Chakravarty – Political activist and commentator. Daily Telegraph Brexit editor, past Political Director of the TaxPayers' Alliance, singer and Brexit editor of The Daily Telegraph.
- Nahid Majid OBE – Civil servant, chief operating officer of Regeneration Investment Organisation and Deputy Director within the Department for Work and Pensions. She is currently the most senior British Bangladeshi Muslim woman in the civil service.
- Niaz Alam – Responsible investment consultant and writer. He was a Director on the Board of the London Pensions Fund Authority from 2001 to 2010, a trustee of the charity War on Want from 2000 to 2007, a member of the BBC Appeals Advisory Committee 2004-08 and is on the Editorial Board of Dhaka Tribune.
- Poppy Jaman – Mental health advocate, and CEO and founding member of Mental Health First Aid England (MHFAE).
- Saleemul Huq – Scientist and Senior Fellow in the Climate Change Group at the International Institute for Environment and Development. In 2007, he was awarded the Burtoni Award for his work on climate change adaptation.
- M. Sayeedur Rahman Khan – Academic and diplomat. He was a former vice-chancellor of the University of Rajshahi and former High Commissioner of Bangladesh in the UK.
- Talyn Rahman-Figueroa – Diplomatic consultant, and Director and founder of Grassroot Diplomat.
- Tozammel "Tony" Huq MBE – Educationist, former Ambassador of Bangladesh to France, Spain and UNESCO, Special Adviser to the Secretary-General of UNESCO.

== Music ==
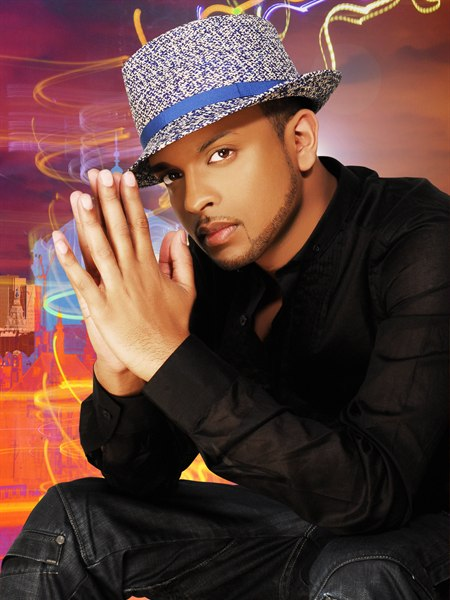
R&B and hip hop singer, Mumzy Stranger

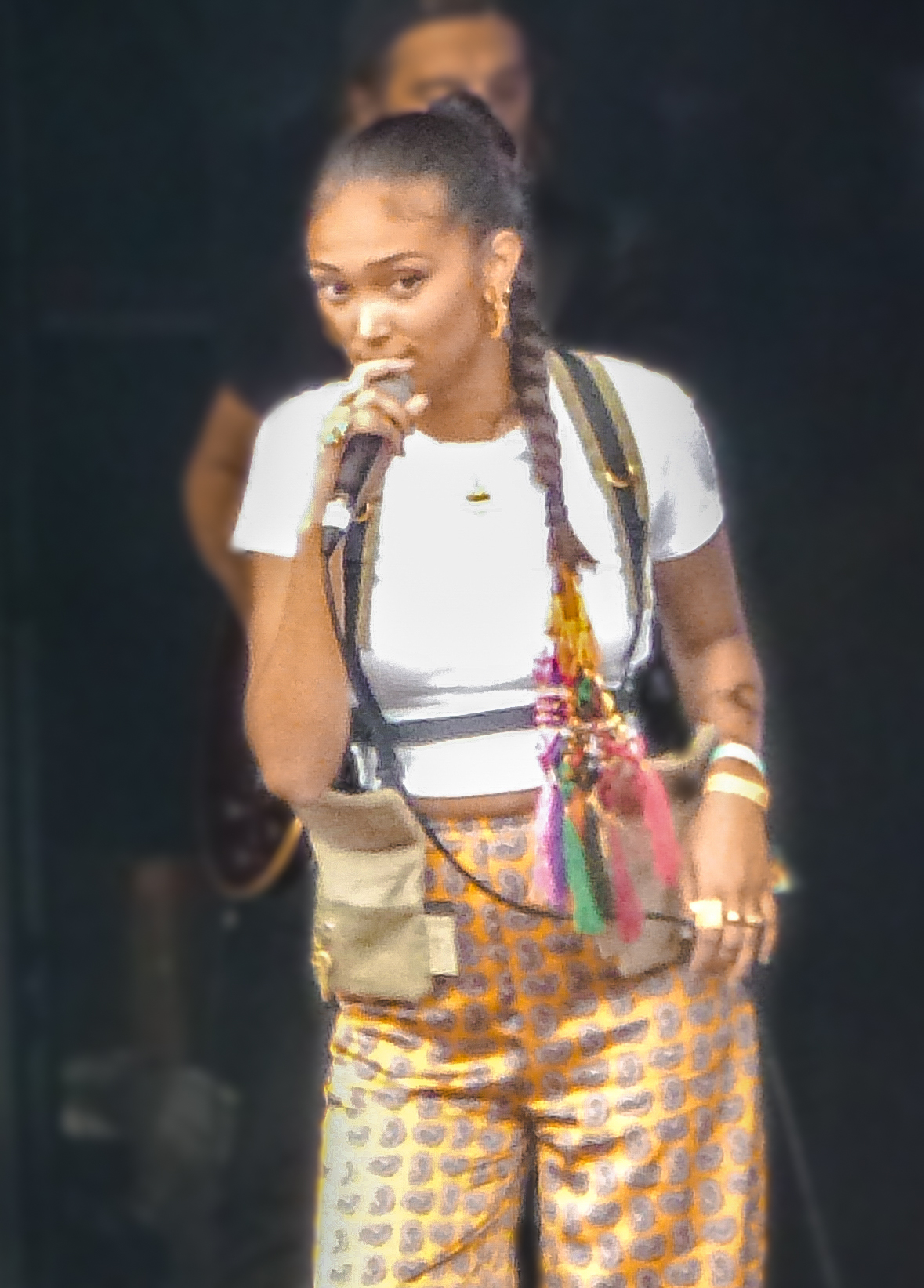
Brit Award nominated singer-songwriter, Joy Crookes

- Alaur Rahman – Folk singer who has released 40 albums.
- Boyan Chowdhury – Former lead guitarist of rock band The Zutons.
- Deeder Zaman – Rapper and former lead vocalist of electronica band Asian Dub Foundation when he was then known as Master D. He has recorded two solo albums: 2008's Minority Large and 2011's Pride of the Underdog.
- Farook Shamsher – Alternative dub dance music DJ, record producer and member of Joi. They have recorded three albums: 1999's One and One Is One, 2000's We Are Three, and 2007's Without Zero. In 2006, he received the Commitment to Scene award at the UK Asian Music Awards.
- Gouri Choudhury – Hindi and Bengali music singer and music teacher. She featured on the track "Radhe Radhe" with Crispian Mills on the Kula Shaker's 1999 album Peasants, Pigs & Astronauts.
- Haroon Shamsher – Alternative dub dance music DJ, record producer who was member of Joi.
- Idris Rahman – Clarinettist, saxophonist and music producer. He has produced and mixed albums, including two Mercury Prize-nominated albums (Zoe Rahman's second album Melting Pot and Basquiat Strings' debut album Basquiat Strings with Seb Rochford) and two albums by vocalist Julia Biel.
- Joy Crookes – Singer-songwriter nominated for Rising Star Award at the 2020 Brit Awards. Placed fourth in BBC's Sound of 2020.
- Kishon Khan – Jazz composer, pianist arranger and music producer. In 2009, his score for The Last Thakur won a Grand Jury award for Best Music at the South Asian International Film Festival in New York.
- Manzur Iqbal – Electronic music producers who is one half of DJ/producer duo Futurecop! alongside Peter Carrol.
- Muhammad Mumith Ahmed / Mumzy Stranger – R&B and hip hop singer-songwriter. In 2009, he became the first musician of Bangladeshi descent to release a mainstream music single with "One More Dance". In 2011, he was awarded Best Urban Act at the UK Asian Music Awards.
- Mushtaq Omar Uddin – Singer, songwriter, music producer, and former lead vocalist of music group Fun-Da-Mental. In 2003, his album The Hour of Two Lights, co-recorded with Terry Hall, was released.
- Nazeel Azami – Religion-based musician whose debut album Dunya was released in 2006.
- Rubayyat Jahan – Singer who reached the final round of Brit Asia TV's Asian Superstars in 2010. In 2013, she was nominated for Best Female Act at the Brit Asia TV Music Awards.
- Schelim Hannan – Singer who was a member of boy band Worlds Apart from 1992 to 1997.
- Shireen Jawad – Bengali folk singer. She has recorded three albums: 2007's Panjabiwala, 2009's Mathwali and 2014's Rangeela.
- Saifullah "Sam" Zaman / State of Bengal – DJ and producer who was associated with the Asian Underground movement. He has recorded two solo album: 1999's Visual Audio and 2007's Skip-IJ.
- Shahin Badar – Dance music singer-songwriter best known for vocals on The Prodigy's single "Smack My Bitch Up", which earned her a Double Platinum award.
- Shakila Karim – Singer-songwriter whose singles "Just Let It Go" and "Heroes" were released in July and December 2011.
- Shama Rahman – Singer-songwriter, sitarist and actress. In 2013, her debut solo album Fable:Time was released.
- Shapla Salique – Bengali folk singer-songwriter and harmonium player. She has released two solo albums; Siyono na Siyona in 1997, and Lai Lai in 2002.
- Sohini Alam – Singer in bands Khiyo., Lokkhi Terra and GRRRL. Co-founder of arts company Komola Collective. Vocalist for Birangona: Women of War and Akram Khan's Desh and Until the Lions. Co-Music Director of documentary Rising Silence.
- Suzana Ansar – Hindi and Bengali folk singer, actress and television presenter based in the UK and Bangladesh. In 2009, her debut band album Suzana Ansar with Khansar was released. In 2013, her second album Mehvashaa, co-recorded with Raja Kaasheff, was released.
- Zoe Rahman – Jazz composer and pianist. In 1999, she was awarded the Perrier Young Jazz Musician of the Year Award. In 2006, her album Melting Pot was nominated for Album of the Year at the Mercury Music Prize.

== Film and drama ==
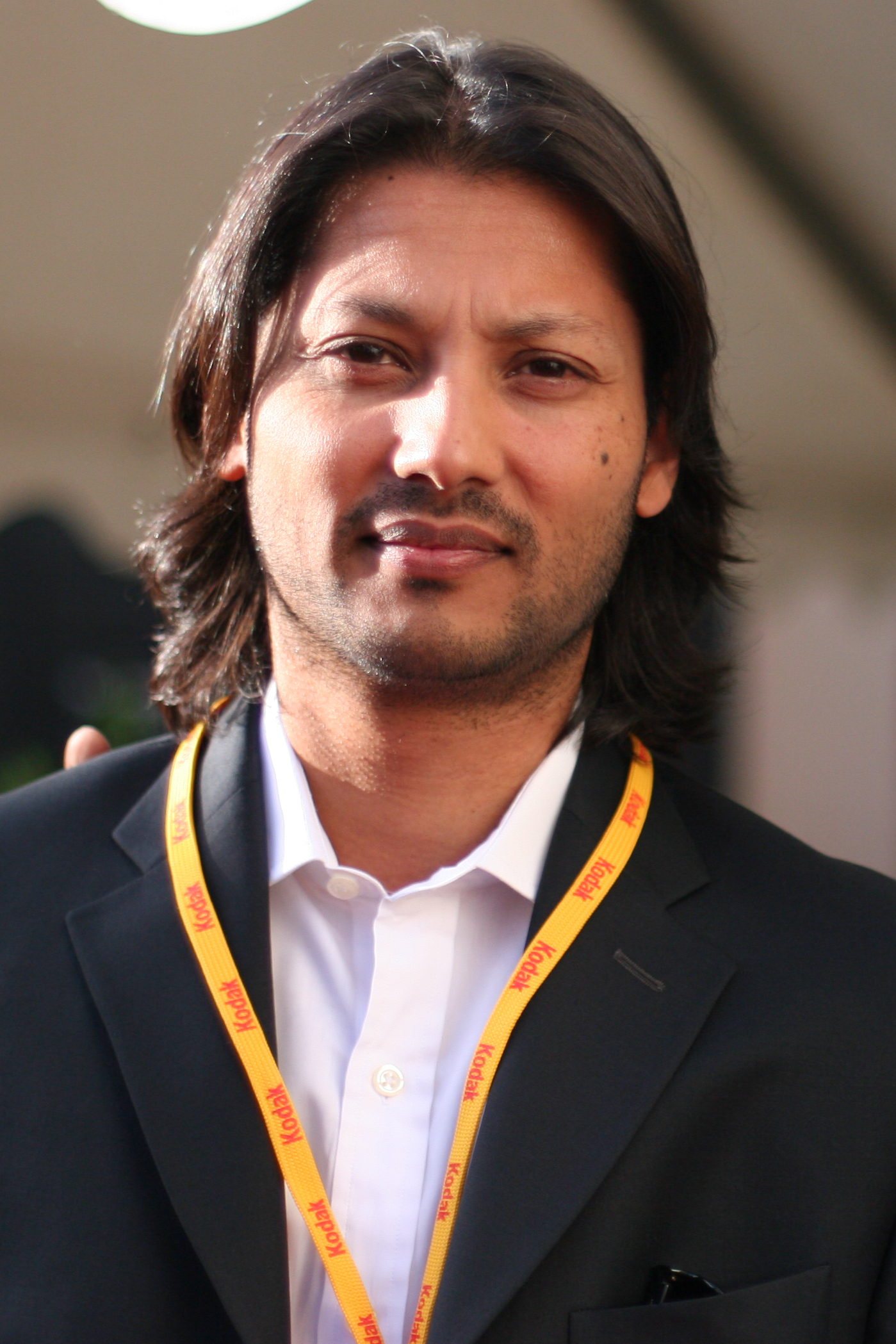
Director of Kidulthood, Menhaj Huda

- Afshan Azad – Actress best known for playing the role of Padma Patil in the Harry Potter film series.
- Assad Zaman – Actor best known for Small Axe and Interview with the Vampire (TV series).
- Dilruba Yasmeen Ruhee – Model and actress best known for her lead role in the 2014 film Shongram.
- Dino Shafeek – Actor and comedian. He starred in several sitcoms during the 1970s and early 1980s. He is best remembered for his comedy roles of Char Wallah Muhammed in It Ain't Half Hot Mum and Ali Nadim in Mind Your Language.
- Farzana Dua Elahe – Actress and music DJ. She is best known for her role of Parveen Abbasi in BBC soap opera EastEnders in 2009.
- Hannan Majid – Documentary filmmaker whose films produced by his production company Rainbow Collective have been exhibited at several international film festivals, including Abu Dhabi, Cambridge, Durban, East End, Leeds International and AlJazeera International Documentary.
- Jan Uddin – Actor best known for his roles as Jalil Iqbal in BBC soap opera EastEnders in 2008 and Sweet Boy in the film Shank.
- Jayasree Kabir – Actress best known for starring in Bangladeshi films Shimana Periye and Rupali Shoikotey.
- Leesa Gazi – Writer, playwright, director, and actress. She is best known for the play Birangona: Women of War and her award-winning 2019 documentary film Rising Silence.
- Menhaj Huda – Film and television director, producer and screenwriter, best known for directing and producing Kidulthood in 2006.
- Munsur Ali – Film producer, screenwriter and director. He wrote, directed and produced Shongram, a romantic drama set during the 1971 Bangladesh Liberation War. This was the first time a British film was simultaneously written, produced and directed by a British Bangladeshi.
- Nazrin Choudhury – Screenwriter and actress on drama serials. In 2006, her critically acclaimed radio play Mixed Blood won the Richard Imison Award.
- Ramzan Miah - Actor, Model and Dancer. Best known for playing the South Asian Ken in the Barbie Movie.
- Ruhul Amin – Film director who has made 15 films for the BBC and Channel 4, including 1986 television feature film drama A Kind of English. Most of his films are documentaries and experimental dramas.
- Sadik Ahmed – Film director, cinematographer and writer. He wrote and directed short film Tanju Miah, which was the first Bangladeshi film to be officially selected in the Toronto, Sundance and Amsterdam film festivals in 2007. He directed feature film The Last Thakur in 2007, which opened screenings at the London, Dubai, Mumbai, New York and other film festivals.
- Saikat Ahamed – Actor and writer based in Bristol best known for his roles in Monday Monday and Trollied, and his one-man shows The Tiger and the Moustache and Strictly Balti.
- Shebz Miah - Best known for Kammy Hadiq in Emmerdale
- Shefali Chowdhury – Actress best known for playing the role of Parvati Patil in the Harry Potter film series.
- Sophiya Haque – Actress, singer and video jockey. She is best remembered for her role of Poppy Morales in ITV soap opera Coronation Street between 2008 and 2009.

== Arts and culture ==
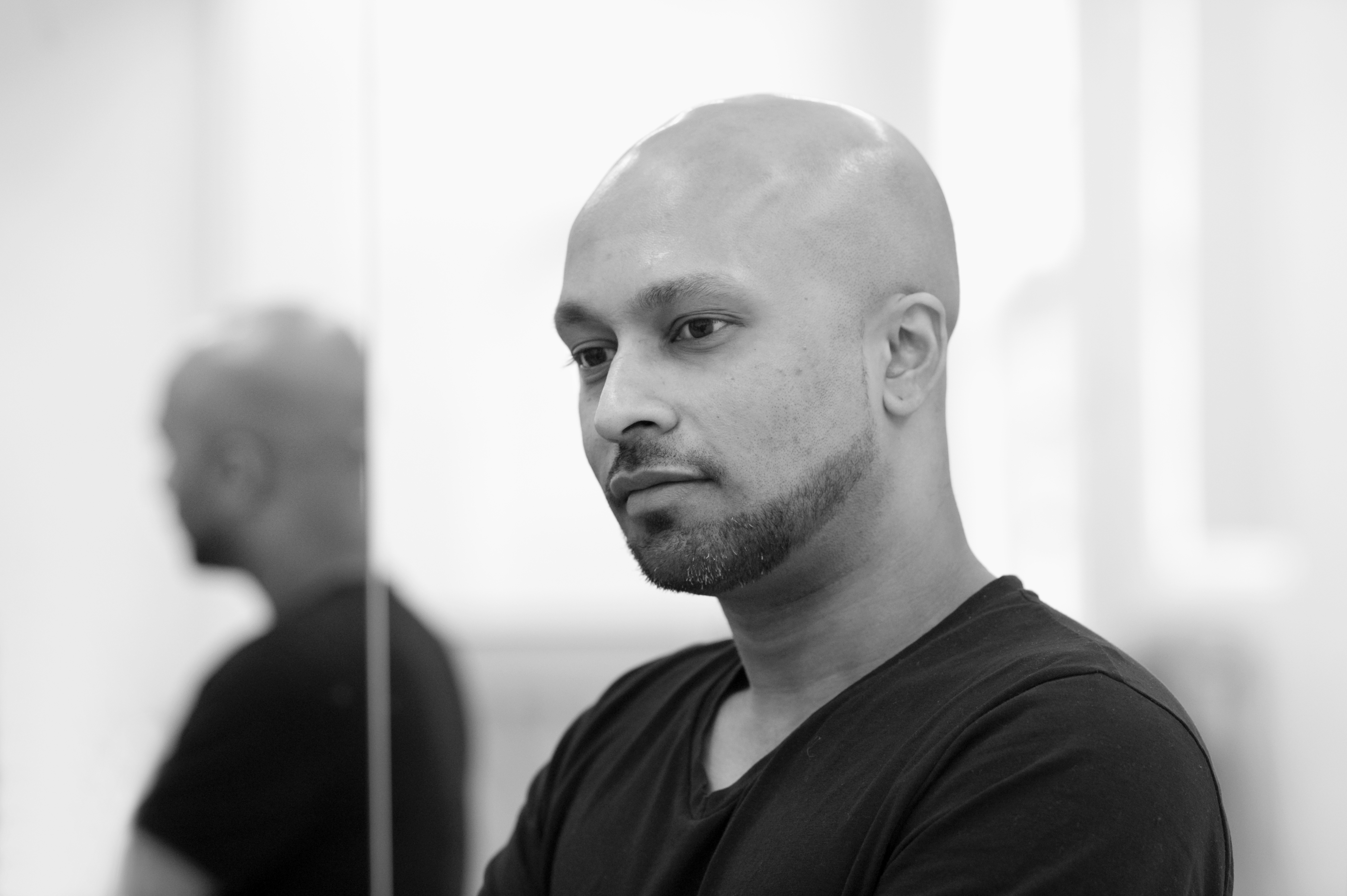
Kathak dancer, Akram Khan

- Akram Khan MBE – Dancer and choreographer with a background in classical kathak training and contemporary dance. He has received numerous awards, including Outstanding Newcomer 2000, Best Modern Choreography 2002 and Outstanding Male or Female Artist (Modern) 2005 at the Critics' Circle National Dance Awards. In 2012, Khan and his dance company performed at the London Olympics opening ceremony.
- Amina Khayyam – Dancer, choreographer and dance teacher. She is best known for her adaptation of Federico García Lorca's play Yerma and her own play A Thousand Faces.
- Kaniz Ali – Makeup artist and freelance beauty columnist. In 2011, she was awarded the Best Make-Up Artist category at International Asian Fashion Awards.
- Momtaz Begum-Hossain – Journalist and craft expert. She has a blog called Cos I Like Making Stuff and has written two craft books. She has been named one of the Top 100 influential crafters in the UK.
- Nadiya Hussain – Winner of the 2015 The Great British Bakeoff, Author and Television Presenter
- Rezia Wahid MBE – Textile artist whose work has been exhibited both in the UK and abroad.
- Ruby Hammer MBE – Fashion and beauty makeup artist, and founder of Ruby & Millie cosmetics brand.
- Runa Islam – Film and photography visual artist, who was nominated for the 2008 Turner Prize.
- Saiman Miah – Architecture student who designed one of the two £5 coins for the 2012 London Summer Olympics.
- Sanchita Islam – Artist, writer and filmmaker. In 1999, she founded Pigment Explosion, which has branched out into projects, including film, painting, drawing, writing and photography.
- Shahidul Alam – Photographer, social activist and founder of Drik Picture Library.
- Sunara Begum – Visual artist, filmmaker, photographer and writer, she uses installation, film, photography and text. In 2006, she co-produced the short film The Idea and founded Chand Aftara Visual Arts, an interdisciplinary arts organisation based in London.

== Academia ==
- Andy Miah – Bioethicist, Professor in Ethics and Emerging Technologies and Director of the Creative Futures Research Centre at the University of the West of Scotland. His work often focuses on technology and posthumanism.
- Dilwar Hussain – Research fellow at The Islamic Foundation in Leicester. He co-authored the 2004 book British Muslims Between Assimilation and Segregation and is on the Home Office's committee tackling radicalisation and extremism.
- Ghulam Sarwar – Director of the Muslim Educational Trust, and an internationally recognised writer on Islam in English, especially for writing and publishing the first English textbook Islam: Beliefs and Teachings.
- Mushtaq Khan – Heterodox economist and Professor of Economics at the School of Oriental and African Studies. His work focuses on the economics of poor countries, including contributions to the field of institutional economics and South Asian development.
- Naila Kabeer – Social economist, research fellow and writer. She works primarily on poverty, gender and social policy issues. Her research interests include gender, poverty, social exclusion, labour markets and livelihoods, social protection, focussed on South and South East Asia.
- Nazneen Rahman – Geneticist who specialises in cancer and heads up the Cancer Genetics Clinical Unit at the Royal Marsden. Her research has seen success in identifying genes that cause cancer particularly in women and children.
- Tipu Aziz – Professor of neurosurgery at the John Radcliffe Hospital in Oxford, and lecturer at Magdalen College, Oxford and Imperial College London medical school. He specialises in the study and treatment of Parkinson's disease, multiple sclerosis, dystonia, spasmodic torticollis, fixed abnormal posture of the neck, tremor and intractable neuropathic pain.

== Legal ==
- Akhlaq Ur-Rahman Choudhury – Barrister specialising in employment law and public law. In 2017, he became the first became the first British person of Bangladeshi origin and Muslim faith to have been appointed as a High Court of Justice.
- Jelina Berlow-Rahman – Solicitor whose practice J R Rahman Solicitors specialises in human rights, asylum, family and immigration legal advice and assistance.
- Khatun Sapnara – Judge. In 2003, she became the first ethnic person to be elected to the Family Law Bar Association Committee. In 2004, she was appointed to the Family Justice Council. She assisted in formulating and drafting the Forced Marriage (Civil Protection) Act 2007. In 2006, she was appointed as a Recorder of the Crown, which made her the only person of Bangladeshi origin in a senior judicial position. In 2014, she was appointed as a Circuit Judge to hear cases in the Crown and Family Court.
- M. A. Muid Khan – Barrister who was selected as the Best Human Rights Lawyer of England and Wales for 2012 by the Chartered Institute of Legal Executives (CILEX). In September 2012, he was ranked as third in the top five Chartered Legal Executive Lawyers of England and Wales by the Law Society.
- Mumtaz Hussain – Solicitor, radio presenter

== Literature ==
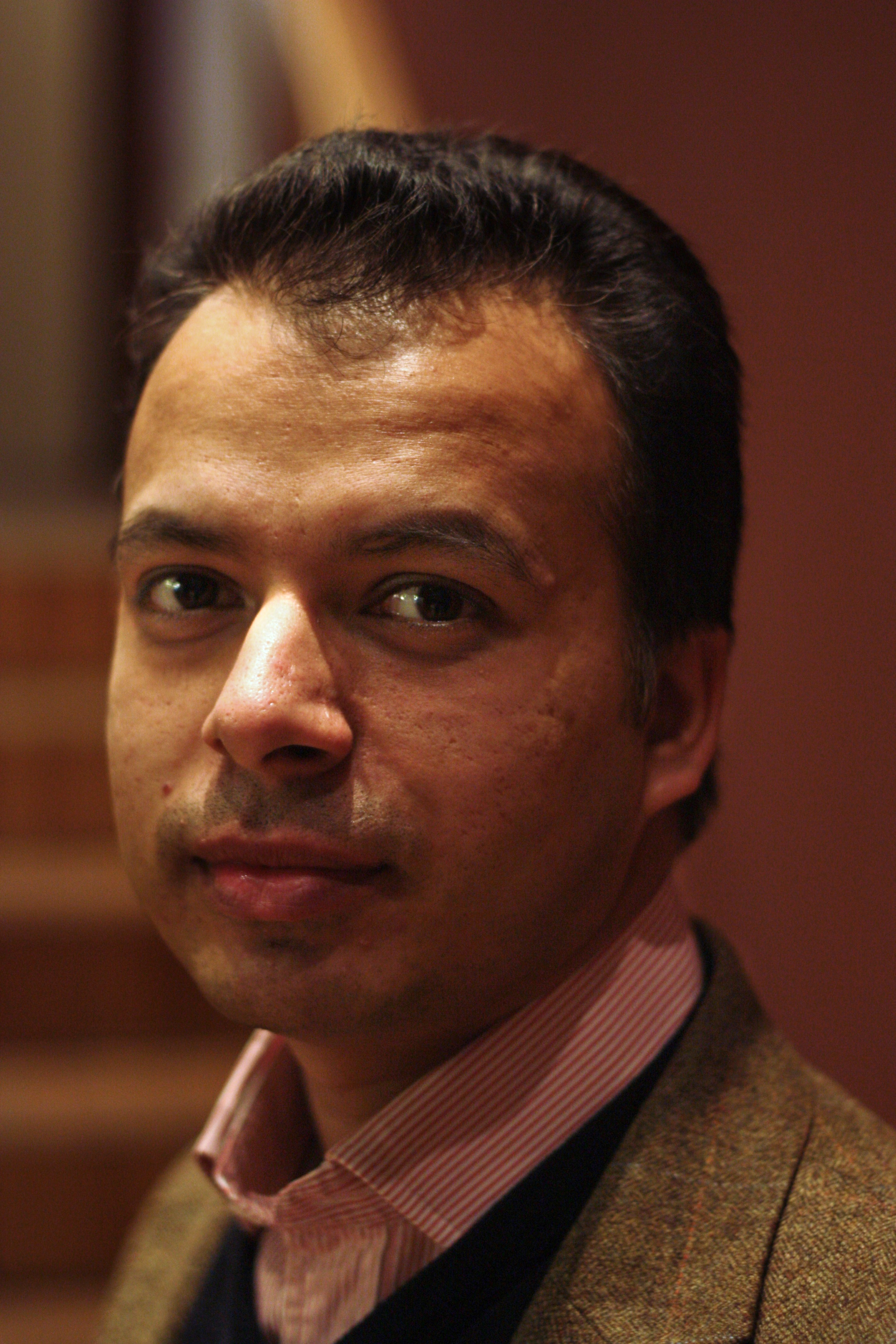
Author of The Islamist, Ed Husain

- Abdur Rouf Choudhury – Bengali diaspora writer and philosopher. He has received numerous literary awards from Bangladesh, and life membership from the Bangla Academy.
- Aminul Hoque – Lecturer and non-fiction writer. In 2015, his first book British-Islamic Identity: Third-generation Bangladeshis from East London was published. In 2005, he received a Philip Lawrence Award.
- Mohammed Mahbub "Ed" Husain – Writer of the 2007 book The Islamist on account of his experience with Hizb ut-Tahrir for five years.
- Ghulam Murshid – Author, scholar and journalist. He has received numerous literary awards from India and Bangladesh, including the Bangla Academy award.
- Kia Abdullah – Best-selling novelist who has written three books: Take It Back, Truth Be Told and Next of Kin.
- Monica Ali – Author of the 2004 novel Brick Lane.
- Muhammad Mojlum Khan – Non-fiction writer. He wrote the 2008 book The Muslim 100: The Lives, Thoughts and Achievements of the Most Influential Muslims in History and the 2013 book The Muslim Heritage of Bengal: The Lives, Thoughts and Achievements of Great Muslim Scholars, Writers and Reformers of Bangladesh and West Bengal.
- Mujibur Rahman – British Bangladeshi Author/Writer. MujiburRahman.com
- Nafeez Mosaddeq Ahmed – Author, lecturer, political scientist specialising in interdisciplinary security studies and participant of the 9/11 Truth movement.
- Onjali Q. Raúf MBE – Best-selling children's author known for The Boy at the Back of the Class.
- Rekha Waheed – Writer and novelist who has written four novels, including 2010's My Bollywood Wedding.
- Roopa Farooki – Novelist.
- Shahida Rahman – Writer best known for her 2012 novel Lascar. In 2015, she was awarded the Arts and Culture Awareness award at the British Muslim Awards.
- Shamim Azad – Bilingual poet, storyteller and writer.
- Tahmima Anam – Author of the 2007 novel A Golden Age which was the Best First Book winner of the Commonwealth Writers' Prize in 2008.
- Zia Haider Rahman – Author of the 2014 novel In the Light of What We Know which was awarded the James Tait Black Memorial Prize.

== Heads of organisations ==
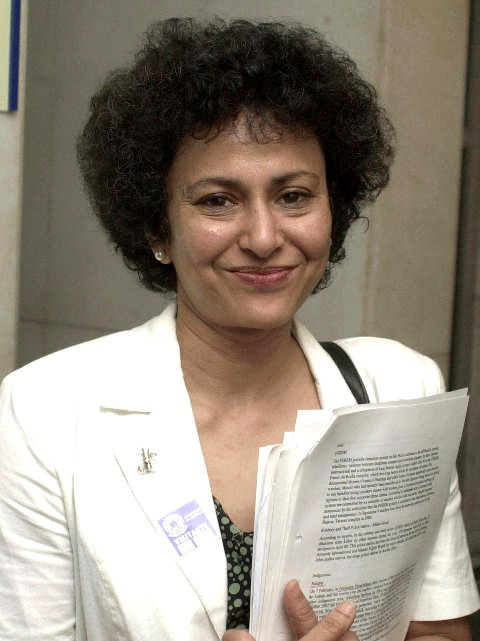
Former Secretary General of Amnesty International, Irene Khan

- Azad Ali – IT worker and civil servant for the HM Treasury. He is also the Islamic Forum of Europe spokesman, founding chair of the Muslim Safety Forum and vice-chair of Unite Against Fascism.
- Chowdhury Mueen-Uddin – Trustee and former chairman of Muslim Aid.
- Faria Alam – Former Football Association secretary. She appeared in the fourth series of Channel Four reality television programme Celebrity Big Brother in 2006.
- Sir Fazle Hasan Abed – Social worker, and founder and Chairman of Bangladesh Rural Advancement Committee (BRAC). In 1980, he received the Ramon Magsaysay Award for Community Leadership.
- Halima Begum - Chief Executive of Oxfam and member of Department for International Development, the British Council, ActionAid and the Runnymede Trust.
- Irene Khan – Consulting editor of Bangladeshi newspaper The Daily Star, Chancellor of University of Salford, and former Secretary-General of Amnesty International; she is the first woman, Asian and Muslim to hold the position. In 2006, she was awarded the Sydney Peace Prize.
- Muhammad Abdul Bari MBE – Physicist, educationalist, Secretary General of the Muslim Council of Britain from 2006 until 2010, Chairman of the East London Mosque and Secretary of Muslim Aid.
- Tanika Gupta MBE – Playwright, TV script writer

== Human rights and humanitarianism ==
- Husna Ahmad OBE – Chief Executive Officer of the Faith Regen Foundation. She sits on the Advisory Board of East London Mosque and she previously sat on the Department for Work and Pensions' Ethnic Minority Advisory Group (EMAG).
- Mya-Rose Craig, ornithologist, campaigner for equal rights, youngest British person to receive an honorary doctorate in science
- Nazia Khanum OBE – Management consultant, researcher, Director of Equality in Diversity, non-executive director for NHS Luton and chair of various voluntary community organisations. In 2008, she carried out a research study of "Forced marriage, family cohesion and community engagement: national learning through a case study of Luton" for the Home Office and Metropolitan Police Service.
- Rahima Begum – Human rights activist, and co-founder and co-director of Restless Beings.
- Sandra Kabir – Philanthropist, executive director of BRAC UK, Labour Party politician and councillor for Queensbury ward in Brent Borough.

== Religious figures ==
- Sheikh Abdul Qayum – Chief Imam of East London Mosque, television presenter for Peace TV Bangla and Channel S, and former lecturer at International Islamic University Malaysia.

== Sport ==
- Abdul Ali "Jacko" – Kickboxer who was two-time world lightweight kick-boxing champion. He also ran JKO Productions, which was part of the kickboxing promotion of Sky Sports and Channel 5.
- Anwar Uddin – Professional footballer who played as a defender. After joining Dagenham and Redbridge he became first British Asian to captain a side in the top four divisions. He is the current manager of Sporting Bengal United.
- Bulbul Hussain – Wheelchair rugby player who plays mostly in a defensive role for Kent Crusaders and the Great Britain paralympic team. In 2008 and 2012, he played for Great Britain at the Paralympic Games.
- Cuba Mitchell - British Jamaican/Bangladeshi footballer
- Farhaan Ali Wahid - Footballer
- Robin Das – Cricketer who playing county cricket for Essex County as a right-handed batsman.
- Imranur Rahman - Sprinter Fastest Bangladeshi Athlete. Personal Best 10.11 seconds in 100m
- Jahid Ahmed – Cricketer who played county cricket for Essex County as a right-handed lower order batsman and a right-arm medium-pace bowler.
- Kasper Hok - Lithuanian born British raised Bangladeshi/Lithuanian footballer
- Mahe Khan - British Bangladeshi footballer
- Hammad Miah – Professional snooker player. In 2013, he qualified for the 2013/2014 and 2014/2015 professional Main Tour as one of four semi-finalists from the first Q School event.
- Hamza Choudhury – Professional footballer who plays as a midfielder for Leicester City.
- Hamza Uddin - British Boxer
- Riaz Amin – Martial artist who practices Shotokan karate and Filipino Martial Arts. In 2014, he became the current World Eskrima Kali Arnis Federation (WEKAF) World Championships world champion.
- Ruqsana Begum – Muay Thai kickboxer. In 2010, she became the current British female atomweight (48–50 kg) Muay Thai boxing champion. In September 2012, she was nominated as captain of the British Muay Thai Team.
- Shahed Ahmed – Professional footballer who played as a striker for Wycombe Wanderers. He currently plays for Sporting Bengal United and has now been appointed as captain.
- Taff Rahman – Football coach and former player.
- Tahmina Begum – Football referee and PE assistant. In 2010, she became the first qualified female referee of Bangladeshi descent in the UK.
- Tanil Salik - British Bangladeshi Footballer
- Zidane Yousuf - British Bangladeshi/Mexican American Footballer
- Zubair Hoque – Racing driver who is the only British Asian in single-seat formula racing.

== Cause célèbres ==
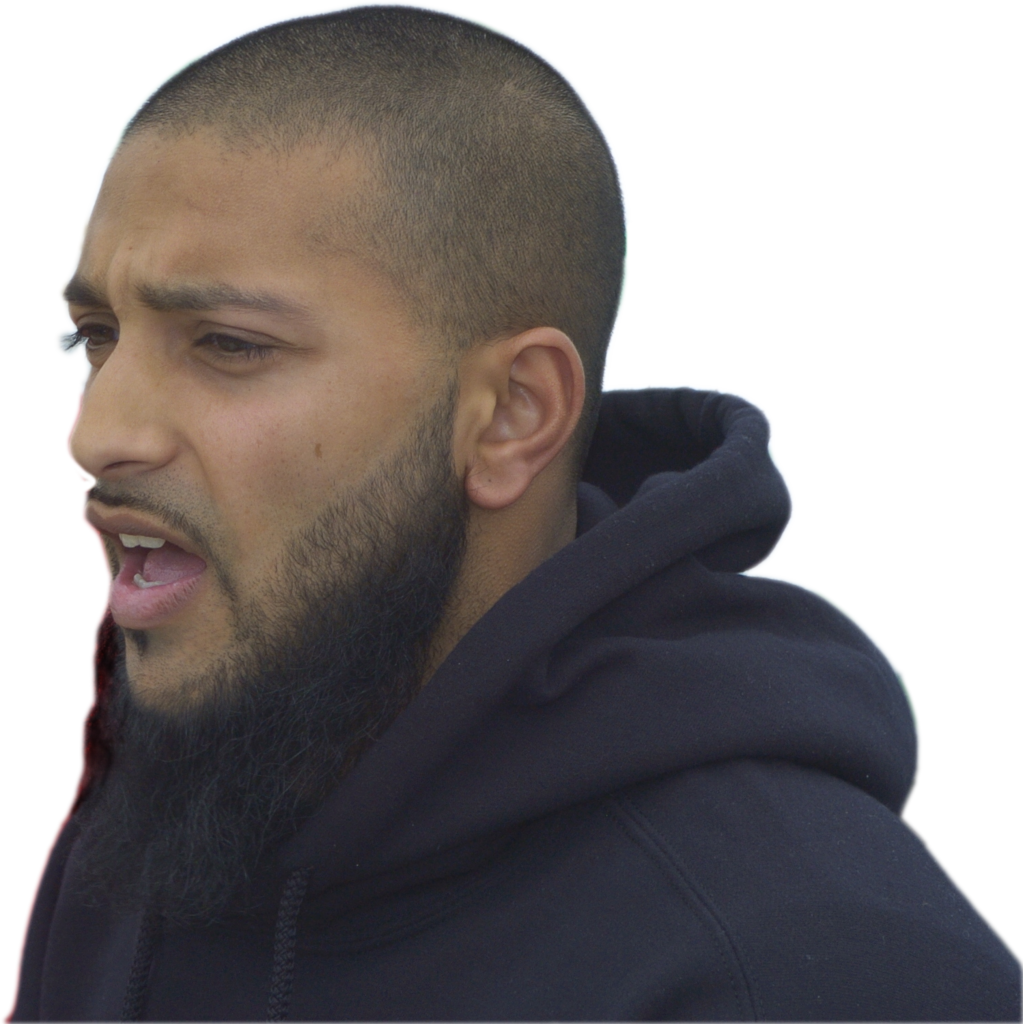
Ruhal Ahmed - A British citizen who was illegally detained by the US government without trial for over two years in the Guantanamo Bay

- Altab Ali – Factory garment worker who was murdered by three teenagers in a racially motived attack on 4 May 1978.
- Humayra Abedin – National Health Service Doctor of Medicine whose parents tried to force her into marriage and held her captive until she was freed by court order in 2008.
- Roshonara Choudhry – Student who stabbed MP Stephen Timms on 14 May 2010 during his constituency surgery in an attempt to kill him. She was found guilty of attempted murder and jailed for life with a minimum term of 15 years.
- Rubel Ahmed – Bangladeshi immigrant to Britain who died in Morton Hall immigration detention centre on 5 September 2014 under controversial circumstances.
- Ruhal Ahmed – Former Guantanamo Bay detainee depicted in the film The Road to Guantanamo.
- Shabina Begum – Student involved in the leading House of Lords case UKHL 15 R (Begum) v Governors of Denbigh High School (2006) on the legal regulation of religious symbols and dress under the Human Rights Act 1998.
- Shahara Islam – One of the victims killed during the 7 July 2005 London bombings. She was the youngest and one of the three Muslims killed during the attacks.
- Syed Talha Ahsan – Poet and translator who won the 2012 Platinum and Bronze Koestler Award for his poetry. On 19 July 2006, he was arrested in response to a request from the U.S under the Extradition Act 2003 and detained without trial or charge over six years before being extradited to the United States on 5 October 2012. He is among the longest British citizens detained without trial or charge in legal history.
- Shamima Begum – Entered Syria to join the Islamic State in February 2015, at the age of 15. Her British citizenship was consequently revoked and she was refused re-entry to the United Kingdom with the decision upheld in the ensuing legal proceedings, Begum v Home Secretary.

== Criminals ==
- Sharmeena Begum – Left the United Kingdom to join the Islamic State of Iraq and the Levant (ISIL) in Syria in December 2014, at age 15, and became an ISIL bride. Two months later, in February 2015, her three school friends (who collectively became known as the Bethnal Green trio) joined her in Syria. Begum is one of the youngest British teenagers to join ISIL.

== See also ==
- British Bangladeshi
- History of Bangladeshis in the United Kingdom
- List of Bangladeshi people
- List of Bengalis
- List of Bangladeshi Americans
- List of Bangladesh-related topics
- List of Sylhetis
