= List of Bangladeshi businesspeople =

This is a list of notable Bangladeshi businesspeople.

== A ==
- Abul Kalam Azad

== B ==
- Bajloor Rashid
- Bibi Russell

== E ==
- Enam Ali

== I ==
- Iqbal Ahmed
- Islam Mohamed Himu
- Iqbal Wahhab

== J ==
- Jelina Berlow-Rahman
- Jahurul Islam

== K ==
- Kutubuddin Ahmed

== M ==
- Mahee Ferdous Jalil
- M. A. Sattar
- Mirza Ahmad Ispahani
- Mirza Mehdy Ispahani
- Moosa Bin Shamsher
- Muhammad Yunus
- Muquim Ahmed
- Mustafa Jabbar

== N ==
- Nihad Kabir
- Nitun Kundu

== O ==
- Obaidul Karim

== R ==
- Rafiquddin Ahmad
- Rubana Huq
- Rajeeb Samdani

== S ==
- Syed Ahmed
- Siraj Ali
- Syed Manzur Elahi
- Shah Abdul Hamid
- Shahriar Sayeed Husain
- Shelim Hussain
- Sayeed Khokon
- Salman F Rahman
- Sara Zaker
- Samia Zaman
- Md. Shafiul Islam Mohiuddin
- Selima Ahmad

== T ==
- Tommy Miah
