= British Bangladeshi Who's Who =

- Author: Mohammed Abdul Karim; Shahadoth Karim
- Language: English
- Series: 1st Edition (2008); 2nd Edition (2009); 3rd Edition (2010); 4th Edition (2011); 5th Edition (2012); 6th Edition (2013); 7th Edition (2014); 8th Edition (2015); 9th Edition (2016); 10th Edition (2017); 11th Edition (2018); 12th Edition (2019); 13th Edition (2022); 14th Edition (2023); 15th Edition (2024); 16th Edition (2025)
- Subject: Biographical dictionary
- Genre: Non-fiction
- Publisher: Bangla Mirror Group
- Publication date: July 2008
- Publication place: United Kingdom
- Media type: Online, print
- Pages: 221
- ISBN: 9780000000002

British Bangladeshi Who's Who is an annual publication highlighting the accomplishments, contributions and achievements of successful British Bangladeshis. It was established in 2008 and also holds an annual award ceremony in London, England.

== History ==
British Bangladeshis Who's Who celebrates individuals from various sectors who are at the top of their respective arena. It is designed to highlight and emphasise distinguished figures in the Bangladeshi community in Britain and continually recognise the success and significance of the Bangladeshi community.

It focuses on British Bangladeshi's support for the economy and highlights individual accomplishment, contributions and achievements of successful, influential and wealthy members of the Bangladeshi community from various sectors and professions. It lists over 200 profiles of British Bangladeshis, including medics, journalists, lawyers, businessmen, accountants and others from various walks of life. A number are picked out to receive awards for their exceptional work.

Since 2008, the British Bangla Media Group and the Bangla Mirror Group have been publishing the British Bangladeshi Who's Who. The publication and event was the original idea of Mohammed Abdul Karim and his son Shahadoth Karim who was the editor in chief and editor. British Bangladeshi Who's Who is currently run by Mohammed Abdul Karim every year.

== Past events ==
In October 2010, the third edition of British Bangladeshi Who's Who included profiles of 200 successful personalities. 400 guests attended the dinner. In October 2011, the annual gala dinner launching the publication took place at Water Lily in East London. In October 2012, the award ceremony and gala dinner was held at the Panorama Hall of Alexandra Palace in North London. In October 2013, the award ceremony and gala dinner was held again at the Panorama Hall of Alexandra Palace. In November 2014, the publication, award ceremony and gala dinner was held for the third consecutive year in the Panorama Hall of Alexandra Palace. In October 2015, a press conference was held at the London Muslim Centre, to announce the launch of the 2015 publication. In November 2015, the publication and gala event was held at Meridian Grand in North London. In November 2016, the publication and gala event was held at Meridian Grand in North London and continues every year. The event was on the 14th November 2023.

== Outstanding Contribution Award ==
2009 winners	2010 winners
Zahid Hussain; Anwar Choudhury; K.M. Abu Taher Choudhury; Shelim Hussain MBE; Shamim Azad; Enam Ali MBE; Ahmed Us Samad Chowhury; Dr. Hasanat M. Husain MBE; Muquim Ahmed; Anis Rahman OBE JP; Dr Mahfuzur Rahman	Abdul Gaffar Choudhury; Rushanara Ali MP; Sapnara Khatun; Dr. Wali Tasar Uddin MBE JP DbA FrsA; Amin Ali; Sir Fazle Hasan Abed
2011 winners	2012 winners
Lutfur Rahman; Dr. Nazia Khanum OBE; Syed Samadul Haque; Dr. Muhammad Abdul Bari MBE; Naufal Zamir; Muhammed Siraj Ali; Monir Ahmed; Al-Haj Noor Miah	Iqbal Ahmed OBE; Ragib Ali; Lisa Aziz; Amirul Choudhury; Nur-ur Rahman Khandaker Pasha; Zakir Khan; Sufi Miah
2013 winners	2014 winners
Captain Tasbirul Chowdhury; Khondker Aminul Haq; Sabirul Islam; Al-Hajj Rois Miah; Mathtabur Rahman Nasir; Baroness Pola Manzila Uddin	Mesba Ahmed; Shamim Chowdhury; Mamun Chowdhury; Nazinur Rahim; Bajloor Rashid MBE; Anwar Uddin
2015 winners	2016 winners
Kamru Ali; Munsur Ali; Akhlaq Choudhury QC; Mahmud Hasan MBE; Dr Rupa Huq MP; Mahbub Murshed	Parvez Ahmed; Md Shahidul Alam (Ratan); Ruqsana Begum; Taj Brothers; Atique Islam Choudhury
2017 winners	2018 winners
Kazi Arif (MBA, DBA); Dr Sanawar Choudhury; Oli Khan MBE FRSA; Mahi Muqit PhD; Syed Nahas Pasha; Shahida Rahman (Shahidun)	Dr Zaki Rezwana Anwar; Mohammad Habeebullah OBE JP; Mohammed Siddiquer Rahman; Nobab Uddin; Mohammad Shab Uddin; Mohammed Mustafa Kamal Yakub
2019 winners	2022 winners
Cllr Barrister Nazir Ahmed FRSA; M Sayed Altab; Mahee Ferdhaus Jalil; Kamrun Nessa Khanom; M A Munim; Sheikh Aliur Rahman; Muhibur Rahman Muhib	Aklakur Rahman; Syedur Rahman Ranu; Barrister Md Luftur Rahman, FCILEx; Cllr Salim Chowdhury; Nazmul Islam Nuru; Tipu Rahman; Amin Babor Chowdhury; Syed Afsar Uddin; Mayor Henna Chowdhury; Mohammad Shamsur Rahman Nickel
2023 winners	2024 winners
Emon Ahmed; Apsana Begum MP; Foysol Hussain Choudhury; MBE MSP; Tofozzul Miah; Mahbub Rahman; Tapan Saha FAIA, FCCA; Abdus Salam; Valerie Ann Taylor OBE	Md Abdul Haque; Yashmin Harun BEM; Jalal Rajonuddin; Shams Uddin Khan; Karim Miah (Shamim); Alaur Rahman; Ashiqur Rahman; Sabbir Zamee

== See also ==
- List of British Bangladeshis
- Who's Who
