= Fareena Alam =

British journalist and program designer (born 1978)

- Born: 1978 (age 47–48); London, England
- Occupations: Editor, journalist
- Spouse: Abdul-Rehman Malik (m. 2002)

Fareena Alam (born 1978) is a British journalist and program designer. She was formerly the editor of Q News.

== Background and career ==
Alam was born in London, England to Bangladeshi Chittagonian parents. She spent her childhood and formative years in Singapore where her father was a civil servant. During this time she was elected as the vice-president and then president of the United Nations Students' Association, National University of Singapore, for which she organised a six-month awareness campaign called ‘The Children of Bangladesh.’ The campaign highlighted the plight of the street children and she then took the campaign a stage further by leading a student delegation of 20 to carry out relief work in Bangladesh for three weeks in 1998.

After graduating from university and returning to England, from 2003 to 2007, she was editor of Q News. She was a freelance contributor to British and international media outlets until 2017. Her major works include a cover story for Newsweek International.

She was a co-founder of the Radical Middle Way Project which is a revolutionary grassroots initiative aimed at articulating a relevant mainstream understanding of Islam that is dynamic, proactive and relevant to young British Muslims. The project was funded by the British government under the early years of its Prevent scheme and by 2009 is said to have received approximately £1.2 million. The RMW's partnership with the government ended in 2010 after the changes made to the Prevent scheme by the newly elected Conservative government.

== Awards ==
In 2005, Alam was named Media Professional of the Year by Islamic Relief. In 2006, she was named Media Professional of the Year at the Asian Women of Achievement Awards.

== Personal life ==
She was raised as a Muslim. In June 2002, she married Abdul-Rehman, a Canadian-born teacher of Punjabi-Pakistani heritage. They met in June 2001 whilst attending a conference organised by the Zaytuna Institute in San Francisco.

== See also ==
- British Bangladeshi
- List of British Bangladeshis
