= Humayra Abedin =

Bangladeshi doctor of medicine

Dr Humayra Abedin
- Born: 2 March 1976 (age 50); Dhaka, Bangladesh
- Education: Master of Public Health; Dhaka Medical College; University of Leeds
- Occupation: General practitioner
- Employer: Whipps Cross Hospital

Humayra Abedin (born 2 March 1976) is a Bangladeshi doctor of medicine who worked for the National Health Service in the United Kingdom and became a cause célèbre after her parents tried to force her into marriage and held her captive until she was freed by court order

== Education and career ==
Abedin was born and brought up in Dhaka, Bangladesh. She is the only child of her parents, Mohammad Joynal Abedin, (born 1932), a retired businessman who at that time owned a clothing factory and several shops, and Begum Sofia Kamal, (born 1941), a housewife. She studied at Viqarunnisa Noon School and College in Dhaka before training as a doctor at Dhaka Medical College.

In September 2002, she came to England to study for a master's degree in public health at the University of Leeds. In 2008, she was training to become a general practitioner at Whipps Cross Hospital in East London. She moved to London and was training to become a registrar at a GP surgery in east London.

== Legal case ==
Abedin's Muslim family became angry after they learned she had a long-term relationship with a Bangladeshi man she met in London, who works as a software engineer.

Since May 2008, her family made several attempts to keep her away from him and to force her into marriage.

At the end of June 2008, the Metropolitan Police launched an inquiry, after she was held captive in her flat by her mother and uncle, who visited for several days. Her case had also been taken up by Interpol.

In August 2008, her family convinced her to return to Bangladesh by claiming her mother was seriously ill. They then hid her passport and plane ticket, and held her captive since 5 August.

On 13 August 2008, Abedin was taken from the family home to an ambulance, taken to a private clinic, given drugs and kept there until 5 November 2008.

After succeeding in getting messages to her friends to say that she was being held against her will, a series of legal moves were instituted on her behalf. Abedin instructed her lawyers to annul the marriage on her behalf.

In December 2008, after her family ignored orders from the Bangladeshi high court to bring Abedin to court. On 5 December 2008, The high court issued an order under the Forced Marriage Act, which makes it illegal to force someone into a marriage against their will. It is thought to be the first time the legislation has been used to help a foreign national who was living abroad. in what is believed to be the first use of the act relating to a foreign national.

On 14 December 2008, two judges ruled that she must remain in custody in a court in Dhaka until she returned to Britain. Abedin then flew from Dhaka to London. On 16 December 2008, she arrived in the UK.

On 19 December 2008, she won high court protection from any renewed attempts to remove her from the UK. Injunctions were issued against Abedin's parents, a paternal uncle and the man she was allegedly forced to marry. Further orders were granted to protect and prevent Abedin from being removed from the UK again. Abedin refused to press charges against her parents.

== See also ==
- British Bangladeshi
- List of British Bangladeshis
