= Q News =

Q News may refer to:

- Q News (Australian magazine), a fortnightly LGBT magazine based in Brisbane, Queensland
- Q News (British magazine), a defunct monthly Muslim magazine that was based in London
