= Mumtaz Begum =

Mumtaz Begum may refer to:

- Mumtaz Begum (actress) (1923–2002), Indian actress
- Mumtaz Begum (activist) (1923–1967), Bengali language activist
- Mumtaz Begum Jehan Dehlavi (popularly known as Madhubala) (1933–1969), Indian film actress
- Mumtaz Begum (mayor) (born 1956), former mayor of Bangalore
- Momtaz Begum (born 1961), Bangladeshi folk singer
- Momtaz Begum-Hossain (born 1981), English journalist
- Momtaz Begum (professor) (died 2020), Awami League politician
