= Serajur Rahman =

British journalist of Bengali Muslim descent (1934–2015)

- সেরাজুর রহমান
- Born: A. N. M. Serajur Rahman; 1934; Chittagong, Bengal Presidency, British India
- Died: 1 June 2015 (aged 81); London, England
- Education: Calcutta Mitra Institution School; Dhaka College
- Occupations: Journalist, broadcaster, columnist
- Years active: 1953–1994
- Employer: BBC
- Spouse: Sofia Rahman
- Children: 2
- Awards: Ekushey Padak (2002)

A. N. M. Serajur Rahman (1934 – 1 June 2015) was a British journalist of Bengali Muslim descent and broadcaster. From 1960 to 1994, he worked for BBC World Service, and was the deputy chief of BBC Bangla Service before retirement. He remains a contentious figure in journalism due to his disputed claim about the death toll in Bangladesh's 1971 Liberation War, asserting that the number was closer to 300,000 rather than the widely cited figure of 3 million.

== Early life ==
Serajur Rahman was born in Chittagong division in the then Bengal Province of the British India. His father, Mawlana Habibur Rahman, was a teacher and scholar at Alia Madrasa in Calcutta. He spent most of his early and formative years in Calcutta, matriculating with distinction in 1947 from Calcutta Mitra Institution School. He was actively involved in the Mukuler Mahfil Youth Organisation. He regularly published articles and short stories in the youth sections of the Daily Azad, Daily Nabajug and Weekly Millat of Calcutta. He regularly participated in programs of All India Radio.

Sometime after the partition of India Serajur Rahman moved to Dhaka, and was admitted to Dhaka College. He was actively involved in the Bengali language movement. He was elected by his college to liaise with the University of Dhaka Students' Action Committee.

== Career ==
Serajur Rahman continued his formal career in journalism. He served in the news departments of the Biweekly Pakistan, Daily Zindegi, Daily Insaf and The Daily Millat. In January 1953, he was appointed editor of the British Information Service in Dhaka. Under his leadership the press section expanded to include 12 journalists. Serajur Rahman during this time also edited a daily bi-lingual news bulletin, the fortnightly British Darpan and the magazine Ajker Commonwealth. From 1954 to 1959, he was also a part-time lead writer in The Daily Ittefaq.

In January 1960, Serajur Rahman joined the then East Pakistan section of the BBC World Service. He helped to co-ordinate the Bangladesh Liberation War's international publicity. In February 1994, he retired as the Deputy Head of the Bengali Section of the BBC World Service. After his retirement, he wrote columns in different newspapers in Bangladesh.

== Awards and recognition ==
In 2002, Serajur Rahman was awarded the Ekushey Padak during the second term of the then prime minister Begum Khaleda Zia. In 2004, he was one of 15 people whom Bangladesh high commission in UK honoured for their significant role there during the Bangladesh Liberation War.

== Personal life and death ==
Serajur Rahman was married to Sophia Rahman. He had one daughter and son, Susan Rahman and Shapan Rahman, who both died before him.

On 1 June, Serajur Rahman died at around 11 am in Royal Free Hospital in London. He was suffering from some critical medical condition and illness for two months, including lung disease and other complications.

== See also ==
- British Bangladeshi
- List of British Bangladeshis
