= Shelina Begum =

English journalist and editor

- শেলিনা বেগম
- Born: 27 December 1979 (age 46); Wardleworth, Rochdale, Greater Manchester, England
- Education: Hopwood Hall College; City of Liverpool College
- Occupation: Journalist
- Years active: 1999–present
- Employer: Manchester Evening News

Shelina Begum (Bengali: শেলিনা বেগম; born 27 December 1979) is an English journalist, former editor of Asian News and former business editor at the Manchester Evening News.

== Early life ==
Begum was born in Wardleworth, Rochdale, Greater Manchester, England and attended Falinge Park High School where she obtained nine GCSEs and went on to get A-levels in English, Sociology and Religious Studies at Hopwood Hall College.

Begum completed the National Council for the Training of Journalists (NCTJ) qualification at City of Liverpool College on a one-day-a-week training course whilst working as a junior reporter at Asian News.

== Career ==
In September 1999, at the age of 19, Begum joined Asian News with no formal journalistic training. She started as trainee reporter and worked up to chief reporter. Begum has supplied the paper with front-page exclusives, and taken responsibility for the Asian News website, which won the Guardian Media Group's best website for 2004.

In 2001, Begum covered the Oldham riots. In October 2005, she was sent on an eight-day assignment to cover the Kashmir earthquake. She wrote a report for the Manchester Evening News and two supplements for Asian News. Her raw video footage and interviews were edited into a half-hour special on Channel M.

In 2007, at the age of 27, she was appointed editor of Asian News. She currently covers business news and features for Manchester Evening News and Greater Manchester Business Week.

Begum is a Member of the House of Lords committee to investigate alienation of Bangladeshi youth from mainstream British life. She was appointed as the first female member on the executive board of the Bangladeshi Association Community Project in Rochdale. She also sits on the committee of the Oldham Diversity Festival. She was also chosen as one of the 100 role models in gender/race equality campaign launched by the European Union (EU). Since 2008, she has been a judge of The Fusion.

Begum also featured in the Northern Powerhouse Women power list 50 in 2020.

== Awards ==
In 2006, Begum was named North West Journalist of the Year at the British Nuclear Fuels-sponsored press wards. She won the award for coverage of the Kashmir earthquake and other exclusives. She was the first Asian female journalist to be awarded an honour in the award 's 15-year-history. In 2007, Begum was nominated for the media personality of the year award at the Fusion Awards. In 2011, she was a finalist at the O2 Media Awards for Business Journalist of the Year.

== Personal life ==
Begum is a Muslim, she speaks fluent Bengali and can understand Urdu and Hindi. She has also taken part in an anti-racism campaign.

== See also ==
- British Bangladeshi
- List of British Bangladeshis
