= Nahid Majid =

Bangladeshi-born British civil servant (born 1964)

Nahid Majid OBE
- নায়াহিদ মাঝিদ
- Born: 19 June 1964 (age 61); East Pakistan (now Bangladesh)
- Education: Urban Planning, Urban Design
- Alma mater: University of Sheffield; University of Westminster
- Occupations: Civil servant, urban planner

Nahid Majid (Bengali: নায়াহিদ মাঝিদ; born 19 June 1964) is a Bangladeshi-born British civil servant, chief operating officer for Regeneration Investment Organisation at UK Trade & Investment, deputy director within the Department for Work and Pensions and former urban planner. She is currently the most senior British Bangladeshi Muslim woman in the civil service.

== Early life and education ==
Majid was born in East Pakistan (now Bangladesh) and came to London, England in 1967 at the age of three. In 1988, she graduated with a degree in urban planning from the University of Sheffield, qualifying as a town planner. In 1996, she graduated with a master's in urban design with merit from the University of Westminster, qualifying as an urban designer.

== Career ==
In 1989, Majid began her career in an inner London local authority on development control applications. In 1995, she moved onto the City Challenge programme in Bethnal Green working on capital projects, Bishopsgate and Broadgate and wrote the urban design strategy for Spitalfields. In 2000, due her success in getting match funding, she was seconded to lead on European structural funds for London negotiating the case for London with local authorities. In 2001, after her secondment she worked as urban renaissance manager for The Prince of Wales's Institute of Architecture leading on good urban design working with the South East England Development Agency.

From 2002, she moved to working in the private sector as associate director of regeneration for international construction consultancy Turner & Townsend. At Turner & Townsend, she was part of the 2012 Olympics legacy working group, helping to write the sustainable placemaking chapter in the winning London bid. She led on the development brief and delivery of the Stephen Lawrence Centre in Deptford and appointed David Adjaye to design the scheme.

From January 2006, she worked as a senior civil servant/deputy director of area initiatives for the Department for Work and Pensions. In January 2010, she was appointed Director of Programme Development at the Mayor's Fund for London, and then as Director of the Commission for Architecture and the Built Environment (CABE).

Majid chaired the Regional Strategies group on Preventing Extremism following the 7 July 2005 bombings, the Mayor of London's Public Questions on Young Londoners in 2010 and the Government's London Places Poverty Group in 2011. She was also previously a Trustee of Planning Aid for London.

In January 2012, Majid was appointed director of the CABE team at the Design Council. In November 2012, she was dismissed from the role. From January to March 2013, whilst in between jobs, she worked as a freelancing consultant for Terry Farrell & Partners.

In April 2013, Majid started working for the UK Trade & Investment (UKTI), where she developed a regeneration strategy which resulted in ministerial and Treasury approval for the Regeneration Investment Organisation (RIO). This subsequently led to her being promoted to chief operating officer in October 2013. She heads a new division whose task is to identify and access credible large scale capital regeneration projects across the UK and to market to overseas investors, sovereign wealth funds and pension funds.

Majid also advises a number of voluntary sector charities, including being a volunteer and trustee of Concern Worldwide. She also is an active mentor and appointed as a Companion of the Chartered Management Institute for Leadership. She is a Strategy Director at Aventa Capital, a private firm with a portfolio of regeneration projects that seeks government financial support, including the Circuit of Wales.

== Honours and recognition ==
In 2006, Majid was appointed an Officer of the Order of the British Empire (OBE) in the 2006 New Year Honours for her services to diversity.

In 2012, she was listed as top eminent UK Planners by Planning Magazine.

== See also ==
- British Bangladeshi
- List of British Bangladeshis
