= Ali Jacko =

British former professional kickboxer (born 1969)

- Born: Abdul Ali; 6 May 1969 (age 57); London, England
- Native name: আলী জ্যাকো
- Other names: Lion-Heart
- Nationality: British
- Height: 5 ft 10 in (1.78 m)
- Weight: 60 kg (130 lb)
- Division: Lightweight
- Style: Shaolin Fist, Wu Shu Kwan, Jujutsu
- Fighting out of: East End of London, England
- Trainer: Eddie Dujon
- Rank: black belt in Kung Fu (Shaolin Fist) black belt in Chinese Boxing (Wu Shu Kwan); 3rd degree black belt in Kickboxing (Jujutsu)
- Years active: 1990–2002

Kickboxing record
- Total: 45
- Wins: 44
- Losses: 1

Other information
- Occupation: Kickboxer, kickboxing promoter, television producer, publisher
- Website: www.alijacko.com

Abdul Ali (Bengali: আব্দুল আলী; born 6 May 1969), better known as his ring name Ali Jacko (Bengali: আলী জ্যাকো), is a British former professional kickboxer who was two-time world lightweight kickboxing world champion who competed between 1990 and 2002. He is the first ever Bangladeshi to be a world champion in combat sports and the first ever Asian kickboxing world champion. He also ran JKO Productions, which was part of the kickboxing promotion of Sky Sports and Channel 5.

== Early life ==
Ali was born in the East End of London. He is of Bangladeshi descent and lived in Bangladesh for six years. His late father Mohammed Chamak Ali was born in Paigaon, Jawa Bazar, Chhatak in Sylhet District, Bengal Presidency (now Sunamganj, Bangladesh), British India. Ali has three younger brothers and two younger sisters.

Ali attended Sir John Cass Redcoat School. At an early age, he played Junior League football and became the BMX Freestyle Schoolboy champion. From 1987, at the age of 17, he ran his own fashion design and manufacturing business. Ali was inspired to take up kickboxing by a chance meeting on an airplane with Muhammad Ali, despite having a serious heart condition.

== Professional kickboxing career ==
In 1986, Ali started training as a kickboxer. On 2 December 1990, he won his first B.I.K.M.A British lightweight kickboxing title. In February 1996, he won the W.M.O European kickboxing title. On 3 October 1999, he won the W.K.N World Inter-Continental Championship. On 26 May 1996, he defeated Frederic Pierre to win the W.K.O World lightweight kickboxing title at The Island in Ilford. In June 2000, Ali took his second World lightweight kickboxing title, this time in the World Kickboxing Network belt.

Ali became the first Asian to win British, European, Inter-Continental and World Full-Contact kickboxing championships. He had a 45 fight career, with one defeat by submission due to injury. Ali's manager and trainer Eddie Dujon took him through his British, European and World Championship fights. Ali retired from kickboxing in 2002.

== Media career ==
In July 1997, Ali launched JKO TV, which produces and provides programmes for terrestrial, satellite and corporate clients. It filmed Thai and kickboxing on Sky Sports and Channel 5.

In June 2000, Ali launched the UK's first all Kick / Thai-boxing magazine Kick Boxing UK.

== Other work ==
In 2011, CA Foundation was established, the foundation is based on a charity dedicated to Ali's father, Chamak Ali. The foundation's objectives are to build hospitals and football stadiums besides creating jobs for the poor people.

In November 2014, Ali conducted a trial among Bangladeshi boxers at the Muhammad Ali Boxing Stadium. The selected boxers were supposed to be given the opportunity to train in the UK to help them enter the professional circuit.

In June 2015, Ali brought his boxer protégé, Suro Chakma, from Bangladesh to train under his supervision at Martin Bowers' gym. In November of the same year, Ali went to India to scout talent and earmarked eight boxers, including World Boxing Council Asian champion, Neeraj Goyat, in his scheme of helping them train in England and managing fights for them. Ali is in talks with famous British professional-boxing promoter Barry Hearn.

In August 2015, Ali started receiving vocal training. On 4 November 2015, Ali's debut single "Give My Love A Brand New Name" was released by record label LBE Music Group. The music video was shot in London, conceptualised by Talvin Singh. and features supermodel and television personality Jodie Kidd. His debut album is due to be released in 2016. In December of the same year, he was interviewed by Nadia Ali on BBC Asian Network.

== Awards ==
Ali won the Canary Wharf Sporting Personality Award in 2001 and the UK Asian Sporting Award in 2003.

== Personal life ==
Ali is a Muslim, and lives in London with his wife and son. He also has a daughter. His mother lives in Bangladesh.

Ali is close of friends with Bollywood actor Salman Khan. In 1996, Khan helped promote Ali's first world title bout and came to watch it in London, and they have been friends ever since.

== Filmography ==
Year	Title	Credit	Notes
2002	Now Is the Time: Night of Combat	Executive producer	
2008	Sucker Punch	Executive producer	
2021	Jack Stall Dead	Jack Stall	Acting and Directorial Debut

== See also ==
- British Bangladeshi
- List of British Bangladeshis
- List of male kickboxers
