= Rejina Sabur-Cross =

British writer

- Born: Rejina Juie Sabur
- Occupation: Writer
- Children: 1
- Writing career
- Pen name: Gastrogeek (2009-15)
- Language: English
- Years active: 2009–present
- Genre: Non-fiction

Rejina Sabur-Cross (née Sabur; Bengali: রেজিনা সবুর) is a British writer. She was active as a freelance food writer, home cook and blogger between 2009 and 2015. She was the author of Gastrogeek: What to eat when you're in a hurry, hungry or hard up.

== Early life ==
Sabur was born and brought up in London, England within a traditional Bengali household.

She has a food and drink journalism qualification and a broadcast journalism postgraduate diploma.

== Career ==
Sabur worked as a researcher on a cookery programme and taught English in Saitama Prefecture, Japan for two years.

In early 2009, Sabur started her food blog Gastrogeek. She specialises in making home cooked meals with an Asian/ethnic twist.

She has written for publications and food websites including The Guardian, BBC Good Food, Channel 4 Food, Le cool, Fork Magazine, Eat Me Magazine and Fire and Knives Food Quarterly. She has also been featured in the Evening Standard, Red Magazine, The Independent, Olive, Amelia's Magazine and Waitrose Kitchen.

She has been interviewed by Tom Parker Bowles on his LBC radio show and by Robert Elms on his BBC London 94.9 show. She has judged dishes for the Brick Lane Curry competition and on television shows including Good Food's The Perfect and Channel 4's Jamie & Jimmy's Food Fight Club.

In January 2013, her first book Gastrogeek: What to eat when you're in a hurry, hungry or hard up was published. The cookbook contains recipes designed for when time or finances are limited.

From January to February 2014, Sabur featured in Sainsbury's six-week campaign called "Make Your Roast Go Further". Along with Jack Monroe, Pam Clarkson, Nick Coffer, she shared recipes and tips online on how to use up leftover food from Sunday roasts.

== Personal life ==
Sabur is married.

== Book(s) ==
Year	Title	Publisher	ISBN
2013	Gastrogeek: What to eat when you're in a hurry, hungry or hard up	Kyle Books	ISBN 978-0857831064

== See also ==
- British Bangladeshi
- List of British Bangladeshis
