= Waliur Rahman Bhuiyan =

Bangladeshi businessman (1952–2020)

Waliur Rahman Bhuiyan OBE
- Born: 2 July 1952; East Bengal, Pakistan
- Died: 19 June 2020 (aged 67)
- Education: University of Dhaka
- Occupation: Businessman
- Title: Managing Director and Country Head of BOC Bangladesh Limited
- Spouse: Sajeda Rahman
- Website: sabirulislam.com

Waliur Rahman Bhuiyan (2 July 1952 – 19 June 2020) was a Bangladeshi businessman.

== Early life ==
Bhuiyan was born in 1952. He did two master's degrees, in economics and business administration from the University of Dhaka.

== Career ==
Bhuiyan joined Linde Bangladesh Limited in 1975.

Bhuiyan was the managing director and country head of Linde Bangladesh Limited (formerly, BOC Bangladesh Ltd.) from 1998 to May 2011. He retired in 2011 over health reasons.

An active member of the business community, Bhuiyan sat on the boards of the Chittagong Stock Exchange, the International Chamber of Commerce and the Bangladesh Employers' Federation. He was the president of the Foreign Investors' Chamber of Commerce and Industry of Bangladesh from 1999 to 2003.

In November 2007, he joined the board of Advanced Chemical Industries (ACI) Limited.

On 25 February 2008, he was appointed to the newly formed board of directors of Bangladesh Biman by the Caretaker government.

Bhuiyan has been Advisor of Robi Axiata Limited since August 2011.

In 2007, Bhuiyan was appointed an honorary Officer of the Order of the British Empire (OBE) for his achievements and services towards strengthening UK-Bangladesh business relations.

== Personal life ==
Bhuiyan married Sajeda Rahman, and had one daughter and one son.

== Death ==
Bhuiyan died on 19 June 2020.

== See also ==
- British Bangladeshi
- Business of British Bangladeshis
- List of British Bangladeshis
