= Syed Neaz Ahmad =

Bangladeshi-born British academic, writer, journalist, and critic

- সৈয়দ নিয়াজ আহমেদ
- Born: 1950s Dhaka, East Bengal
- Education: University of Dhaka (BA); University of London (MA)
- Occupations: Academic, writer, journalist
- Years active: 1975–present
- Title: Chief Executive of Media World
- Spouse: Rina Musharraf
- Children: 4
- Website: neazahmad.co.uk

Syed Neaz Ahmad (Bengali: সৈয়দ নিয়াজ আহমেদ) is a Bangladeshi-born British academic, writer, journalist, and critic based in London. He is best known for anchoring NTV Europe current affairs talk show Talking Point.

== Education ==
Ahmad obtained a first class BA (Honours) and a first class MA from Dhaka University during the Bangladesh freedom movement. Later he graduated with an MA in comparative linguistics from the University of London to pursue higher studies and research. His main area of research and interest is comparative linguistics in Arabic and English.

== Career ==
From September 1975 until June 2008, Ahmad was senior lecturer at Umm al-Qura University and taught English language, creative writing and applied linguistics.

While at Umm al-Qura University, he authored a series of three textbooks on writing for students of engineering and Islamic architecture which are used at Middle East universities. His research has featured in many textbooks. He contributed articles, features, book reviews and weekly columns to Jeddah-based daily newspapers: Saudi Gazette and Arab News. His weekly column, Viewpoint was published for 25 years, a record in the Middle East. He was also editor of Saudi Gazette for five years. He has also appeared on Saudi television chat shows and was often interviewed on Jeddah FM radio. After leaving his job at the Umm al-Qura University, Ahmad was editorial consultant for Saudi NGO Muslim World League's English Journal.

Ahmad writes for The Guardian on Muslim and Middle East issues. He has also been published in the USA Today, Asian Tribune, BusinessWeek, BioScience Encyclopedia, UNHCR reports published by the United Nations, the Virginia-based Institute on Religion and Public Policy publications. He currently writes editorial articles for the Dhaka Daily, New Age and Jeddah newspaper, Arab News. His articles are carried by websites worldwide including Middle East Online, Newspeg.com, Journalisted.com, World Political Report, Medarabnews and US National Public Radio. His articles have been translated into Arabic, Bulgarian, Italian, Spanish, Portuguese, Indonesian, Bengali, Hindi and Japanese.

Ahmad presents Talking Point, a current affairs talk show which airs every Tuesday at 8 pm on NTV Europe. He has interviewed several prime ministers, ministers, MPs, Oscar winners, Nobel laureates and has edited academic journals. He has given over 50 talks on BBC World Service Radio on topics related to Islamic rituals, practices and education and social norms. During his stay in Saudi Arabia he was often a guest on Saudi television talk shows and Jeddah FM Radio.

Since January 2000, Ahmad has been a chief executive of a resource and research organisation, Media World. He is currently working on his memoir, Saudi Arabia: A Holy Country That Was. Syed Neaz Ahmad was awarded Fellowship of the Royal Society of Arts FRSA in May 2019.

== Personal life ==
Ahmad lives in London with his wife, Rina Musharraf, and four children, Faisal, Talal, Tania and Anzar.

== See also ==
- British Bangladeshi
- List of British Bangladeshis
