= Nurul Islam (broadcaster) =

British-Bangladeshi journalist and presenter

- নুরুল ইসলাম
- Born: 25 November 1928; Dacca, Bengal Presidency, British India
- Died: 7 October 2006 (aged 77); Surrey, England
- Citizenship: British
- Education: Economics and Politics
- Alma mater: London School of Economics
- Occupations: Broadcast journalist, news presenter, radio producer, radio presenter
- Years active: 1949–1988

Nurul Islam (Bengali: নুরুল ইসলাম; 25 November 1928 – 7 October 2006) was a British-Bangladeshi broadcast journalist, news presenter, and radio producer and presenter. He had more than 50 years of experience in radio and television and is best known for his work with the BBC World Service.

== Career ==
Nurul Islam was born in Dacca, Bengal Presidency, British Raj (now Bangladesh). Initially trained as a photographer and an actor. Worked for the Department of Films and Publication after partition in 1947.

In 1949, Nurul Islam travelled to London and studied economics and politics at the London School of Economics, and commenced freelance work as a Bengali contributor, actor and broadcaster for BBC Radio. He returned to Pakistan and worked in both radio and television, helping to make government newsreels at key moments in history.

After announcing on radio the independent state of Bangladesh in 1971, Nurul Islam returned to the BBC in England. He joined the Voice of America in Washington, D.C. in the late 1970s for two years, after which he returned to BBC World Service based in Bush House in London and presented Bengali language children's program, Kakoli.

In 1988, following his official retirement Nurul Islam continued as a freelance broadcaster and a mentor to his colleagues at the Bengali section of the World Service at the BBC.

== Death ==
Nurul Islam died in Surrey, England after a period of illness.

== See also ==
- British Bangladeshi
- List of British Bangladeshis
