= Jobeda Ali =

English businesswoman, social entrepreneur, documentary filmmaker (1975–2020)

- জোবেদা বেগম আলী
- Born: Jobeda Begum Ali; 7 January 1975; Sylhet, Bangladesh
- Died: 8 April 2020 (aged 45); Dagenham, England
- Education: Tower Hamlets College; Trinity College, Cambridge
- Occupations: Businesswoman, social entrepreneur, filmmaker, writer
- Years active: 2003–2020
- Title: Chief executive, Three Sisters Care
- Website: empathicurbanite.wordpress.com

Jobeda Begum Ali (Bengali: জোবেদা বেগম আলী; 7 January 1975 – 8 April 2020) was an English businesswoman, social entrepreneur, documentary filmmaker and chief executive of Three Sisters Care.

== Early life ==
Ali and her sisters grew up in Tower Hamlets, London, England. Her parents are from Meherpur District, Khulna Division, Bangladesh.

Ali gained three grade As in A-levels at Tower Hamlets College. In 1996, Ali graduated with a 2:1 BA Hons in Indian and African history from Trinity College, Cambridge. In 2000, she completed an MA in history, and in 2004, she completed an MA in world trade and development: regulation and responsibility at the University of Cambridge.

== Filmmaking career ==
Ali was an independent documentary filmmaker. In 2003, she made a documentary in Bangladesh Matchmaker for Channel 4. In 2004, she made two films about development Regime-Makers for Current TV. She made two series about Muslim women across the world, one commissioned by Institute for Strategic Dialogue and the other by Eris Foundation.

Ali was the founder of the Cineforum format, a film festival/conference which showcases films from around the world. One of the most impactful Cineforums was called Muslim Women: Visibility and Leadership. In 2009, The Road to Ecotopia Cineform culminated in the film, The Road to Ecotopia and bought together 150 sustainability experts to design a template for a positive future society.

== Business career ==
In November 2007, Ali founded Fair Knowledge, a media company. After four years, over time Ali and the other two partners disagreed on the direction of the company. After the other two partners left, Ali dissolved the company in December 2012.

In January 2012, she co-founded Three Sisters Care, a care company providing care at home to elderly and disabled people, with three share-holding directors; herself and her two sisters; healthcare worker and community activist Rahena Begum, and child minder Jaida Begum. The homecare agency works across London and the suburbs, mainly with older people, but also with young adults with disabilities. In 2014, it won the Social Enterprise of the Year Award at the Precious Awards in recognition of its social business practices.

In January 2016 Ali pulled together a consortium from around the UK and won a government contract to build robots for the care sector in a high profile and controversial project called CHIRON. Alongside Three Sisters Care, the other consortium partners are Shadow Robot Company, Bristol Robotics Lab at the University of the West of England, Designability, Telemetra Associates and SH&BA. Ali appeared in various media and events clarifying the role of robots in the care of old people.

== Media contributions ==
In March 2009, Ali contributed to a discussion feminism on BBC Radio 4 hosted by Bettany Hughes. She is on The Guardian Social Enterprise Advisory Panel. and in May 2010, she contributed to a discussion on how women can and should be playing a bigger role in social enterprise. In March 2015, spoke about a new ethical model of providing care on BBC Radio 4.

In October 2012, she played a key role in organising and speaking at KPMG's first ever TEDx event in India.

Ali was a regular contributor to The Guardian Social Care Blog and wrote about ethical employment and living wage in the care sector.

== Other work ==
Ali worked for the government, NGO and media sectors, and private sectors in education, mentoring and diversity. She was manager of the Group to Encourage Ethnic Minority Applicants (GEEMA) at the University of Cambridge. She was a programme manager for further and higher education in the government, she was a board member of the Learning and Skills Council, manager of business diversity at the London Development Agency, a board member of Healthwatch Tower Hamlets. and a board member of Global Urban Development.

She was a fellow of School for Social Entrepreneurs and has written entrepreneurship curriculum for universities.

She also ran London Science and Geek Chic Socials, an events organisation focused on science events for single people in London.

== Awards and nominations ==
In 2007, Ali was one of 20 women from across the world to be selected as a "Rising Talent" by the Women's Forum for the Economy and Society. In August 2010, she won the Social Business Leader award at Ogunte Women's Social Leadership Awards. In 2015, she was shortlisted for Social Enterprise of the Year Award at the Forward Ladies Women in Business Awards.

== Personal life ==
Ali was a Muslim and referred to herself as feminist.

== See also ==
- British Bangladeshi
- List of British Bangladeshis
