= Husna Ahmad =

British humanitarian and writer (born 1964)

Husna Ahmad OBE
- হুসনা পারভীন আহমেদ
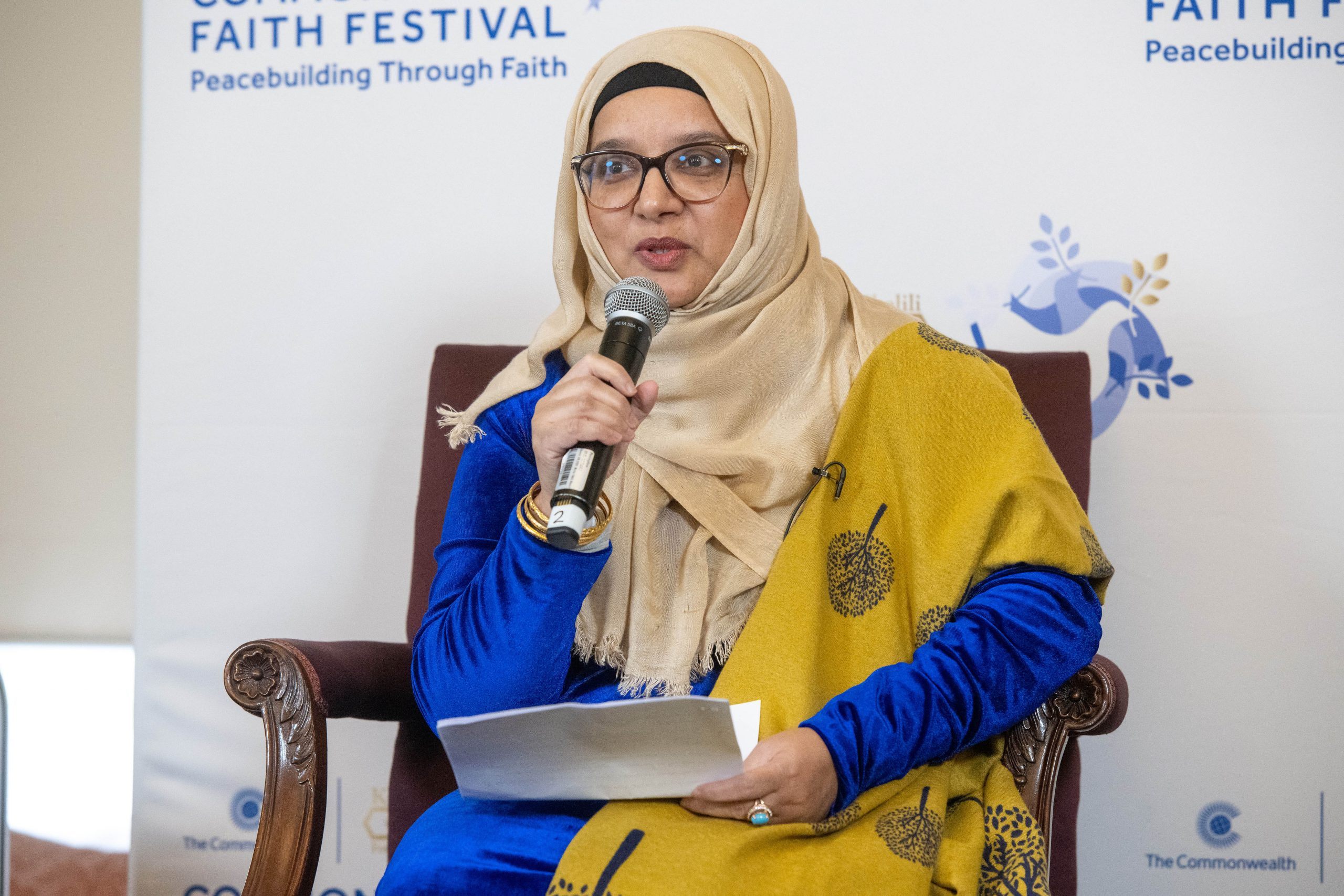
- Ahmad speaking at the launch of the Commonwealth Faith Festival in 2024
- Born: Husna Parvin Ahmad; 28 June 1964 (age 62); Dhaka, East Pakistan
- Education: School of Oriental and African Studies (Ph.D.)
- Occupations: Humanitarian, writer
- Years active: 2006–present
- Title: Secretary-General at World Muslim Leadership Forum
- Spouse: Saif Uddin Ahmad
- Children: 6
- Website: globalone.org.uk

Husna Parvin Ahmad, OBE (Bengali: হুসনা পারভীন আহমেদ; born 28 June 1964) is a British humanitarian and writer, and the CEO of Global One 2015, a women-led INGO. She is Secretary-General of the World Muslim Leadership Forum. She was the chief executive officer of the Faith Regen Foundation.

== Early life ==
Husna Ahmad was born in Dhaka, East Pakistan (now Bangladesh), and moved to the United Kingdom at the age of four. She has a PhD in International Environmental Law from the School of Oriental and African Studies, University of London.

== Career ==
From June 2006 to March 2013, Ahmad was CEO of Faith Regen Foundation. She was a member of Faith Regen Foundation's staff since its inception in October 2001 and has previously held the position of director of operations.

Ahmad sat on the advisory board of the East London Mosque. She held the role of deputy chief executive of the Forum against Islamophobia and Racism and was a principal officer in the Royal Borough of Kensington and Chelsea. She previously sat on the Department for Work and Pensions' Ethnic Minority Advisory Group (EMAG). She also sat on the Community Development Forum of the London Health Commission. She was the co-chair of the National Council of Faiths and Beliefs in Further Education.

In March 2005, Ahmad was on the judging panel for The Muslim News Awards for Excellence. In 2008, she was a member of a Ministerial Working Group on Child Poverty in London.

In November, 2009, Ahmad was invited to join a UK Muslim Women Delegation to the Grand Mosque in Kuwait. Also in 2009, she was invited by the Foreign & Commonwealth Office to join a British Muslims delegation to Iran.

In 2011, Ahmad joined the Centre for the Modern Family, a think tank launched by Scottish Widows to improve the understanding of the challenges facing modern British families. In 2011, she co-authored The Green Guide For Hajj, with EcoMuslim consultant Omar Faruk, the book encourages ecologically sustainable practices among Hajj pilgrims and promotes the role Muslims can play in protecting nature. In 2012, she wrote Islam and Water, the story of Hajjar second wife of the Islamic prophet Ibrahim, in particular her search for water, which is commemorated every year in the Hajj. Both books were commissioned by the Alliance of Religions and Conservation.

Between 2012 and 2015, Ahmad was a National Council member for the Royal National Lifeboat Institute, a charity saving lives at sea in the UK and Republic of Ireland. From 2012, she also held the position of Islamic Advisor to the Alliance of Religions and Conservation.

From 2015 to 2022 she was a board member for Faith in Water. In 2015, Ahmad also became a board member for the Global Interfaith WASH Alliance.

In 2016, Ahmad became a board member for BOND, a UK network for organisations working in international development. This was a position that she held until 2019. Between 2016 and 2019, Ahmad also acted as an International Advisory Board Member to the Commonwealth initiative on Freedom of Religion or Belief.

In 2019, Ahmad undertook her role as co-chair of the Multi Faith Advisory Council to the UN Taskforce on Religion and Development, a position that she held until 2021. She remains a member of the Multi Faith Advisory Council.

In 2022, Ahmad was invited to join working group 17 of The Rockefeller Foundation and Brookings Institutes’ annual “17 Rooms” global flagship process. She is also a member of the IF20 Environment Working Group.

Ahmad continues to hold a number of positions, including Secretary General of the World Muslim Leadership Forum and Board Member MCEC Palmers Green Mosque. She is also an Honorary Fellow of the Edward Cadbury Centre at Birmingham University, UK.

== Alliance of NGOs and CSOs for South-South Cooperation ==
Husna Ahmad is Global Coordinator for the Alliance of NGOs and CSOs for South-South Cooperation (ANCSSC). Launched in November 2018, the ANCSSC works in collaboration with the United Nations Office for South-South Cooperation (UNOSSC), to enhance civil society's understanding of the value of South-South Cooperation in developmental, humanitarian and related spheres. The ANCSSC encourages the sharing of knowledge, expertise and contextually appropriate technologies and assets among NGOs and CSOs, particularly those that have been developed in their respective organisational and operational experiences in developing countries.

In her capacity as Global Coordinator, Ahmad has convened numerous events. These include a hybrid side-event at the Global South-South Development Expo in Bangkok, Thailand. Held on 14 September 2022, the event was entitled Exploring the nexus between civil society, government, and the private sector in promoting economic inclusion, digitalization, and education.

Under the ANCSSC, Ahmad also held a hybrid parallel event at the United Nations High-Level Political Forum (HPLF) on Sustainable Development. Convened in collaboration with Act Alliance on 8 July 2022, the event was hosted by Deloitte in New York, USA, under the title Reimagining our world together: Building Global South multi-stakeholder partnerships for an inclusive COVID-19 recovery.

During MENA Climate Week held in the UAE on 31 March 2022, Ahmad convened a side-event, in collaboration with United Cities and Local Governments of Africa at the Dubai Exhibition Centre. The side-event was entitled Local government and civil society working towards an integrated approach to building resilience and inclusion by accelerating adaptation in the MENA region and African countries.

== Speaking engagements ==
Event	Title	Capacity of attendance	Date	Location
Roundtable on Charities, Philanthropy and Communities, No. 10 Downing Street		Speaker	March, 2023	London, UK
Saverah Women Business Awards		Judge	February, 2023	London, UK
UN COP 15 Biodiversity and Nature Loss	Multiple sessions	Speaker and moderator	December, 2022	Montreal, Canada
Global South-South Development Expo	Exploring the nexus between civil society, government, and the private sector in promoting economic inclusion, digitalization, and education, held by the ANCSSC	Organiser	September, 2022	Bangkok, Thailand
United Nations High-Level Political Forum (HPLF) on Sustainable Development	Reimagining our world together: Building Global South multi-stakeholder partnerships for an inclusive COVID-19 recovery parallel event, held by the ANCSSC	Organiser and speaker	July, 2022	New York, USA
Cambridge Climate and Sustainability Forum		Guest	June, 2022	Cambridge, UK
Economist Impact event	Religious tourism: Encouraging inclusive growth	Panelist	May, 2022	Chania, Greece
MENA Climate Week	Local government and civil society working towards an integrated approach to building resilience and inclusion by accelerating adaptation in the MENA region and African countries side-event, held by the ANCSSC	Organiser	March, 2022	Dubai, UAE
UN Environment Assembly: Faith for Earth Dialogue	Faith, Values & Ethics in Environmental Governance	Speaker	February, 2022	Nairobi, Kenya
World Innovation Summit for Education	Multiple sessions	Panelist	December, 2021	Doha, Qatar
UNICEF World Day of Prayer & Action for Children		Keynote speaker	November, 2021	Dubai, UAE
United Nations COP-26	Multiple sessions	Speaker	November, 2021	Glasgow, Scotland
World Bank Annual Meetings	Faith Roundtable	Panelist	October, 2019	Washington D.C., USA
United Nations High-Level Political Forum (HPLF) on Sustainable Development	The Annual Kofi Annan Faith Briefings	Side event organiser	July, 2019	New York, USA
Women Deliver Annual Conference		Panelist	June, 2019	Vancouver, Canada
Research Center for Islamic Legislation and Ethics (CILE) Ethics of Environment		Keynote speaker	March, 2019	Doha, Qatar
UN BAPA+40		Side event organiser and speaker	March, 2019	Buenos Aires, Argentina

== Awards and recognition ==
In 2004, Husna Ahmad won the Organisation Ethnic award from the European Federation of Black Women Business Owners. The awards are open to black and minority ethnic women who start or run a business.

In April 2010, she received an Ambassador for Peace award from the Universal Peace Federation. In 2010, she was also appointed an Officer of the Order of the British Empire (OBE) in the 2010 New Year Honours for her services to disadvantaged people for work promoting social justice with disadvantaged communities.

== Personal life ==
Husna Ahmad lives in New Southgate, London with her husband, Saif Uddin Ahmad, who is the Chair of McAndrew Leadership, an international development consultancy. She has six children (born between 1983 and 2005).

== Books ==
Year	Title	Publisher
2011	Green Guide to Hajj	Global One
2012	Islam and Water	Alliance of Religions and Conservation
2012	Islamic Farming Toolkit	Global One
2019	Global One 2015, South-South in Action series of UNOSSC	Global One
2021	Green Guide to Hajj and Umrah	Ummah for Earth

== See also ==
- British Bangladeshi
- List of British Bangladeshis
