= Poppy Jaman =

English civil servant (born 1976)

Poppy Jaman OBE
- সুলতানা পপি জামান
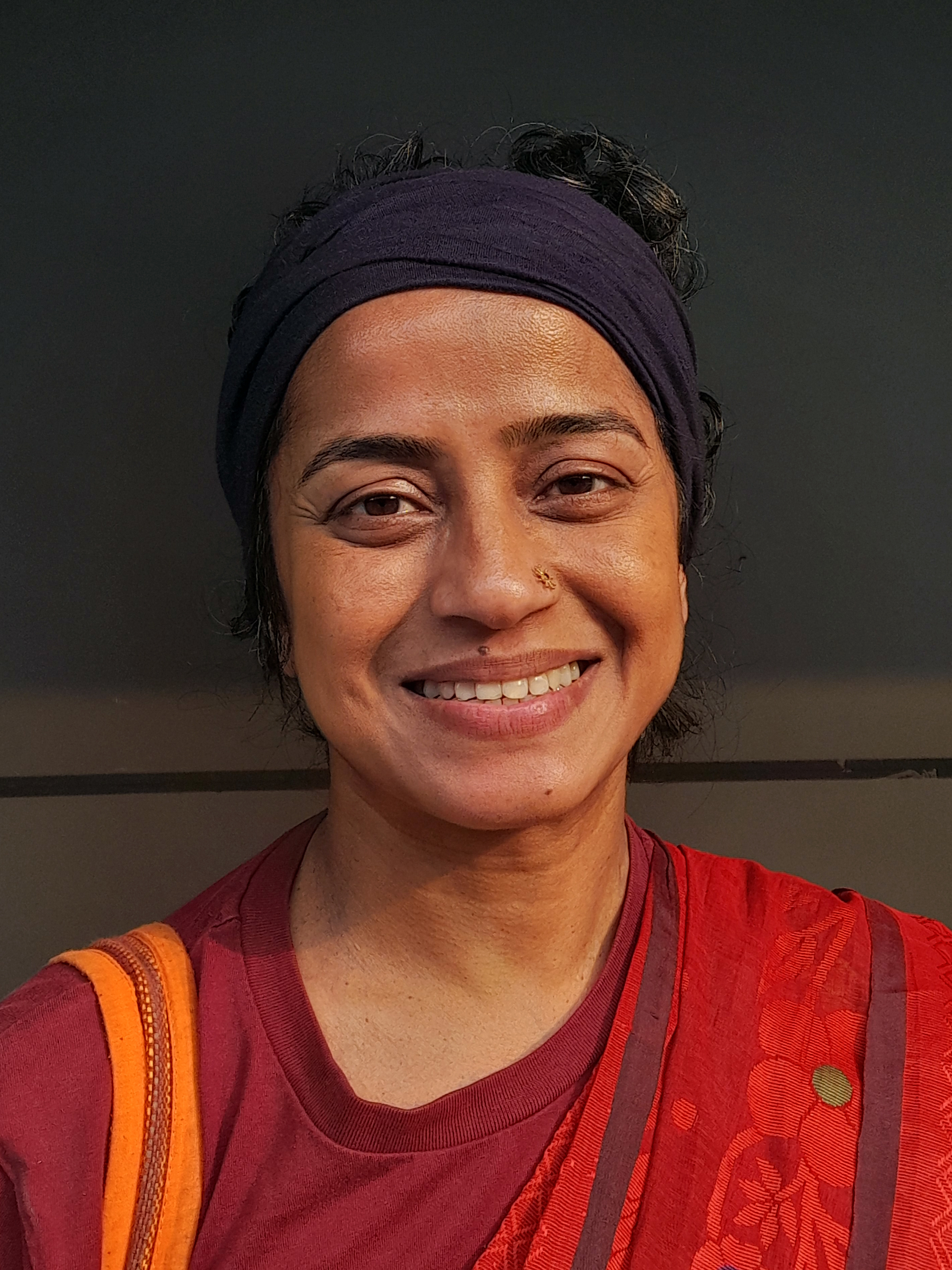
- Poppy Jaman
- Born: Poppy Sultana Jaman; 4 September 1976 (age 49); Bangladesh
- Occupation: civil servant
- Years active: 2007–present
- Title: CEO and founder of Mental health first aid England (MHFAE)
- Children: 4

Poppy Sultana Jaman OBE (Bengali: সুলতানা পপি জামান; born 4 September 1976) is a Bangladeshi civil servant, mental health advocate, and the CEO and founding member of Mental Health First Aid England (MHFAE).

== Early life ==
Jaman is a third-generation British Bangladeshi who grew up in a traditional Bangladeshi household in Portsmouth and left school at the age of 16 with GCSEs and had an arranged marriage at 17. At the age of 20, her first daughter was born, and shortly after this she developed post-natal depression and anxiety. Eventually she ended her marriage and became a single mother.

As a child, Jaman wanted to become an electronics engineer.

== Career ==
In 1999, Jaman started out as a community development worker in Portsmouth and then joined the Department of Health. From December 2003 to February 2004, she was strategic business manager for Portsmouth City Primary Care Trust. From 2004 to 2009, she was race equality programme lead for National Institute for Mental Health in England.

In 2007, after the Department of Health asked Jaman and her colleagues to investigate how they could roll out mental health training across England, they found out Mental Health First Aid training was being implemented across Scotland and realised that it was a translatable programme that could work in England. Within the same year, the National Institute for Mental Health in England started offering Mental Health First Aid courses. Due to its popularity, it was decided that Mental Health First Aid should be set up as a separate social enterprise. In May 2009, Jaman became a founding member and chief executive of Mental health first aid (MHFA) England, which is a not-for-profit organisation that teaches people how to identify and support a person who may be experiencing mental ill health. Jaman was asked to lead the development of MHFA England as a Community Interest Company.

Since October 2015, Jaman has been Programme Director for the City Mental Health Alliance, a network of thought leaders from the City of London-based organisations committed to improving and raising awareness of mental health in the workplace. Since February 2014, she has sat on the board as non-executive director of Public Health England (PHE). From October 2014 to July 2015, she was non-executive director of the Armed Forces Community Directory.

Internationally, Jaman has supported the development of MHFA in Bangladesh, trained orphanage workers in mental health literacy in Goa, and at the request of the Ugandan Government, provided training for the controversial Ugandan People's Defence Force.

In 2009, while working for the Department of Health, Jaman completed her MBA at the University of Portsmouth. She also has a Post Graduate Diploma in Executive Coaching.

== Personal life ==
In 2017, Jaman married her partner of seven years. She lives in East Sussex with her husband and their four children.

Jaman has cited her experience of depression as a young woman, growing up in a deprived ward in Portsmouth and leaving school at 16 (although she later got an MBA) helped her to develop an understanding of the challenges facing people with mental health problems, especially among diverse groups.

== See also ==
- British Bangladeshi
- List of British Bangladeshis
