= M. A. Muid Khan =

British lawyer, activist (born 1977)

- মাহমুদ আব্দুল মঈদ খান
- Born: Muhammed Abdul Muid Khan; Sylhet, Bangladesh
- Education: Law
- Alma mater: University of Dhaka; University of London; City Law School
- Occupation: Barrister
- Website: www.eumigrations.com

Muhammed Abdul Muid Khan (Bengali: মাহমুদ আব্দুল মঈদ খান) is a Bangladeshi-born British barrister and human rights activist. In 2012, he was recognised by the Bar Council, Law Society and CILEX as the "Best Human Rights Lawyer" in England and Wales.

== Early life ==
Khan is the second son of the late A.N.M. Abdul Mannan Khan, ex-chairman and senior professor of the Department of Arabic, University of Dhaka.

Khan graduated with a first class in LL.M and a 2.1 in Bachelor of Laws from University of Dhaka. He completed his Bar Vocational Course (BVC) from City Law School in London. In November 2005, Khan was called to the English Bar as a barrister-at-law by Lincoln's Inn.

Khan is a qualified chartered legal executive lawyer of the CILEX, a Level – 3 Qualified Immigration Advisor of Organisation of Immigration Services Commissioner (OISC) and an Advocate of the Supreme Court of Bangladesh.

== Career ==
Khan is the first British-Bangladeshi recognised jointly by the Bar Council, Law Society and CILEX for his significant achievement in the field of human rights, domestic violence and in the protection of fundamental freedom. He works as a principal and supervisor for an international law firm, the EU Migration Services. He has also practiced as an appeal consultant and practice manager for Rest Harrow & Co Solicitors. Khan is also actively involved in various national and international pro-bono works in the fields of human rights and fundamental freedom.

Khan specialises in all areas of defamation, family law, employment law, road traffic offences, education law, social security law, bankruptcy law, landlord and tenants, contract, fraud, arbitration, immigration law, human rights and fundamental freedom, and judicial reviews. Khan is also an expert in Muslim family law, civil, criminal and family law of Bangladesh.

Khan also regularly contributes articles in the national and international newspapers including Barristers Magazine, UK Border Agency's publication, LexisNexis, Daily Star, The Independent, the Financial Times, Bangla Mirror, the New Nations, Islamic Digest and Dhaka Courier.

Khan is the founder presenter of the live television legal talk show for Bengali Community Law and Order (Ayeen o Odhikar) which airs every Saturday on NTV Europe (Sky 852). He is also the founder, presenter and researcher of the show Legal Updates with NTV which airs every Saturday on NTV Europe.

== Awards and recognition ==
In April 2011, Khan was jointly honoured by The Law Society of England & Wales, Bar council and ILEX for the "Advocacy in the face of Adversity 2011" award from among all the Black & Asian Barristers, Solicitors, Fellows of ILEX and other lawyers of the United Kingdom and Wales. He won this award for his significant contribution in the field of human rights, domestic violence and Immigration Rules.

In November 2011, Khan was named one of the top seven Legal Executives of the Year at The Law Society's Excellence Awards 2011 in London. He became the first British Bangladeshi to receive the honour.

In May 2012, Khan was selected as the Best Human Rights Lawyer of England and Wales for 2012 by the Chartered Institute of Legal Executives (CILEX), in recognition of his outstanding commitment to promote pro bono work, his significant contribution in the field of human rights and fundamental freedom.

In September 2012, Khan was ranked as third in the top five chartered legal executive lawyers of England and Wales by the Law Society.

In 2012, he was also nominated as a model of chartered legal executive excellence.

== See also ==
- British Bangladeshi
- List of British Bangladeshis
