= Mumtaz Hussain (solicitor) =

English solicitor and radio presenter

- মমতাজ হুসেইন
- Born: London, England
- Occupations: Solicitor; model; actress; radio presenter
- Years active: 1992–present
- Children: 2
- Website: mumtazhussain.com

Mumtaz Hussain (Bengali: মমতাজ হুসেইন) is an English solicitor and radio presenter. She is best known for presenting Health and Healing with Mumtaz on RedShift Radio.

== Early life ==
She was born into a Muslim family background. Her father came to the United Kingdom from Bangladesh at the age of 15 or 16. Her mother was 19 when Mumtaz was born. Her mother is an artist.

As a teenager Mumtaz had aspirations to be either a doctor or a lawyer. She describes her early self as being the "sensible, academic, hardworking non-rebellious eldest daughter of four siblings" and because of her parents' understanding of the value of a good education she was encouraged to study law at university. She received support from her parents and studied, and went on to successfully qualify as a solicitor.

== Career ==
Having qualified as a solicitor Mumtaz worked in family law, commercial, civil litigation, wills, crime and personal injury. She then moved to a large national law firm, working as a Senior manager in their personal injury department.

After a brief career in acting and modelling, the area of law that she eventually focused on is civil law. She then took a career-break following the birth of her two children in quick succession. Mumtaz then moved from Croydon to the North West as a single mother with two young children and secured a Board Directorship with a Manchester-based Regeneration Initiative, working alongside Manchester City Council, the Home Office and Paul Boateng MP (among others) on diversity and inclusion projects, addressing the issues faced by black and ethnic minority communities to encourage stronger integration into mainstream community activities in areas such as business, health, education and crime-prevention measures. In the meantime, She also owned and ran her own legal practice in South Cheshire.

On completion of this role, Mumtaz went back to working as a solicitor for a small South London firm which rapidly grew into one of the largest legal conglomerates in the UK. She was promoted to senior manager level, with her career progression culminating in her being asked to participate in a major project involving the successful collaboration between her law firm and an internationally renowned insurance company.

In 2010, Mumtaz closed her legal practise and took up the role of hosting a twice weekly local radio show Health and Healing with Mumtaz on RedShift Radio. On the show, Mumtaz discussed all aspects of health, healing, spirituality and well-being.

In the same year, she began specialising in business development in the media and broadcasting arena.

In Manchester she joined Pannone as a solicitor and Business Development Manager for the Connect2Law referral and support network for law firms across the UK, established by Pannone in 2001.

== Recognition ==
In 2011, Mumtaz Hussain was selected as one of 50 women in Manchester "Most Likely to Make an Impact".

== Personal life ==
Mumtaz is a single mother, and has lived and worked in London and Manchester.

Mumtaz has worked as a mentor for 15 and 16-year-old girls, as part of an initiative to highlight the varied career and lifestyle options that are available to young teenagers who may not have this information easily available to them. She has also spoken before an invited audience of the need to support victims of domestic aggression and supports projects that seek to eradicate this.

== See also ==
- British Bangladeshi
- List of British Bangladeshis
