= Rekha Waheed =

English novelist and writer of Bangladeshi

- Born: Rekha Waheed; Shepherd's Bush, London, England
- Education: MSc Economic Development
- Alma mater: School of Oriental and African Studies
- Occupations: Novelist, writer
- Writing career
- Language: English
- Years active: 2005–present
- Subjects: Arranged marriage in the Indian subcontinent, Bengali wedding, British Bangladeshi, British Asian women

Rekha Waheed (Bengali: রেখা ওহীদ রহমান; née Waheed) is an English novelist and writer of Bangladeshi descent. She has written four novels including 2004's The A-Z Guide to Arranged Marriage, and 2010's Saris and the City and My Bollywood Wedding.

== Early life ==
Rekha Waheed was born in Shepherd's Bush, London, England to parents of Bangladeshi origin. She completed her MSc in economic development at the School of Oriental and African Studies, University of London.

Whilst pursuing her passion for writing she travelled the world as a corporate consultant. However, she soon caught the attention of a literary agent delivering public readings at the Harrow Writers' club.

== Career ==
In October 2005, Waheed's debut novel The A-Z Guide to Arranged Marriage was published by Monsoon Press. In April 2010, her second novel Saris and the City was published by Little Black Dress, followed by her third novel Adam Akbar – Master of Poverty by Perfect Publishers in June 2010, and then her fourth novel My Bollywood Wedding by Little Black Dress in December 2010. Waheed says her natural writing style is first-person narrative. Her distinct style has been described as "bridging the gap between old world traditions with new world savvy".

In June 2005, Waheed co-founded Monsoon Press Publisher with Rabina Khan. Through Monsoon Press, she works with the Arts Council and Penguin to raise the profile of British Ethnic and Muslim literature. She has previously worked as a columnist for Bangla Mirror and sat on the board of Women in Publishing. In addition, she has worked voluntarily as a treasurer for a Bengali community organisation. She is currently represented by MBA Literary Agency.

In 2006, Waheed read at the London Literacy Event. In 2007, she read at the Spitalfields Literacy Event. In 2006, she was cited by Asian Woman magazine as one of the "Faces to Watch" and one of the fastest rising British Asians in media. She is regular guest on BBC Asian Network, women's programmes, and literary and social events to debate social issues affecting British Asians in the west.

== Personal life ==
Waheed is a Muslim.

== Novels ==
Year	Title	Publisher	ISBN
2005	The A-Z Guide to Arranged Marriage	Monsoon Press	978-0755215003
2010	Saris and the City	Little Black Dress	978-0755356133
2010	Adam Akbar – Master of Poverty	Perfect Publishers Ltd	978-1905399505
2010	My Bollywood Wedding	Little Black Dress	978-0755356140

== See also ==
- List of British Bangladeshis
- List of English writers
- List of Muslim writers and poets
