= Atique Choudhury =

English restaurateur and chef (born 1963)

- আতিকু ইসলাম চৌধুরী
- Born: Atique Islam Choudhury; 5 May 1963 (age 62); St Albans, Hertfordshire, England
- Occupations: Industrialist, restaurateur, chef
- Years active: 1980s–present
- Spouse: Moy Siriret
- Children: 1
- Website: www.yumyumthain16.co.uk

Atique Islam Choudhury (Bengali: আতিকুল ইসলাম চৌধুরী; born 5 May 1963) is an English restaurateur and chef.

== Early life ==
Choudhury was born in St Albans, Hertfordshire, England. His parents are Dabirul Islam Choudhury and Khaleda Choudhury.

When Choudhury was young he set up and ran a tuck shop at school that rivalled the school canteen. He built it up and then got told off for being too good at it, since it was taking business away from the school canteen.

== Career ==
In 1980s, three chefs walked out of Choudhury's parents' south Indian vegetarian restaurant in north east London as they were offered ludicrous money in the short term to build up the competitor's business. Choudhury then ran the kitchen and the business was gradually built back up.

In 1984, Choudhury came to Stoke Newington. After he ran his own Indian restaurant. In 1990, Choudhury and his wife opened a Thai restaurant together called Yum Yum in Stoke Newington. In 1992, because of its popularity he had converted his existing south Indian vegetarian restaurant, Spices, into another Thai restaurant. In 1995, he opened Yum Yum in Loughborough.

Choudhury has also established a Thai internet café. He created the Asian Oriental School of Catering, which specialised in training and finding employment for young people and providing a high level quality chefs throughout London and the UK. In 1995, Choudhury co-founded the Thai Restaurants Association.

Having left school to go straight into work Choudhury returned to education after his businesses were running to do a level four NVQ in restaurant management. He chaired a project called "breaking the log jam" set up by the hotel and catering training foundation which has now established the new NVQ.

Choudhury pioneered the Stoke Newington Restaurant Watch. He is governor at Thomas Abney School.

Choudhury is the proprietor of three restaurants in north London, Yum Yum Thai, the Japanese Oishiii and the Mexican Mercado.

== Awards and nominations ==
Choudhury's personal and business awards include; Egon Ronay's Guide Oriental Restaurants Oriental Chef of the Year 1996, Caterer and Hotelkeeper Healthy Menu Award 1986, 1999, winner of the Thai Food Festival, Egon Rhonay Oriental Chef of the Year 1999, Hackney Chamber of Commerce award for the best service in business 1999, Thai Select Award for Thai Cuisine, UK Food Service award winner 2000, Arts & Business award in 2001, Thai Trade & Commerce Award for Chef of the Year 2003, LBC 2003 Oriental Restaurant of The Year, Archant London Restaurant Award, Best Thai Restaurant 2007, Mayor of Hackney Business Awards, Best Business in Hackney 2009, 2006 presented by the Royal Thai Embassy and Buddhapadipa Temple an Honorary Certificate in recognition of his work for the Thai community in the UK, 1997 Finalist Best Thai Restaurant in London (Carlton TV).

In 2012, Oishiii won Best Japanese Restaurant at the Asian Curry Awards, sponsored by Booker Wholesale.

== Personal life ==
Choudhury is married to Moy Siriret, who is from Thailand. They have a son, Rishi (born 1988).

Choudhury is a supporter of Arsenal F.C.

His father, Dabirul Choudhury, inspired by fellow British fundraiser Captain Tom Moore, embarked on a campaign to walk around his garden a thousand times to raise money for charities during the COVID-19 pandemic. Choudhury supported his father, and made an Iftar cuisine as a celebration. For his efforts, Elizabeth II awarded Dabirul Choudhury an Order of the British Empire.

== See also ==
- British Bangladeshi
- Business of British Bangladeshis
- List of British Bangladeshis
