= Momtaz Begum-Hossain =

English freelance journalist, craft expert and presenter (born 1981)

- মমতাজ বেগম-হোসেন
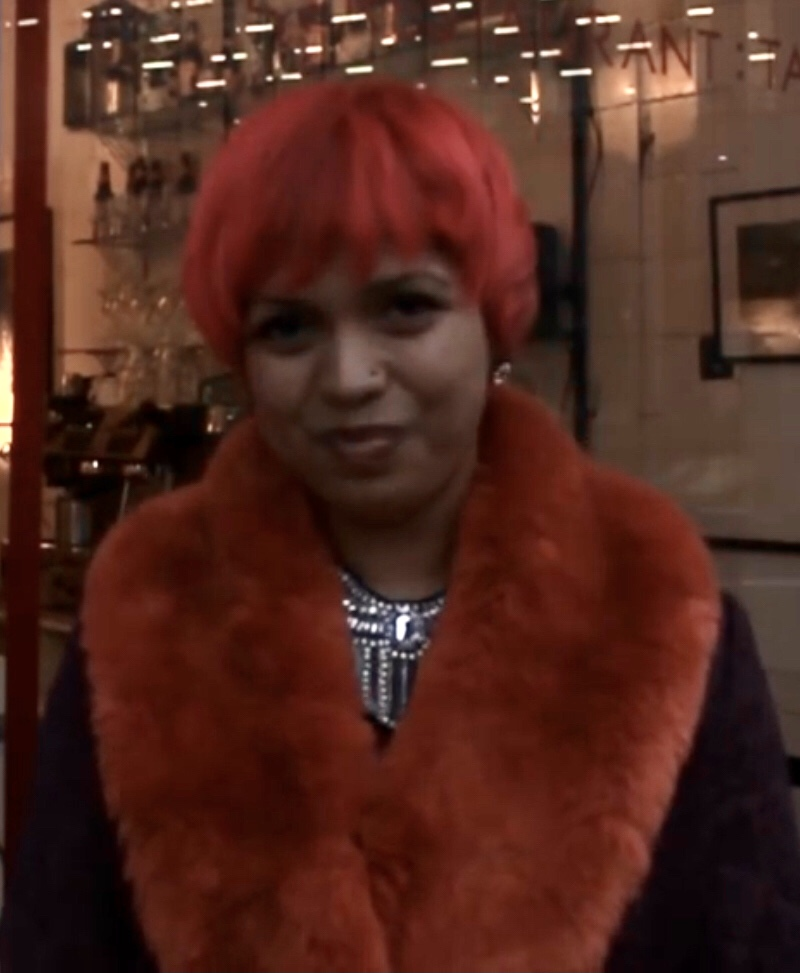
- Begum-Hossain in 2015
- Born: 8 December 1981 (age 44)
- Education: Harlow College; University of Sussex
- Occupations: Colour expert, journalist, crafts expert and presenter
- Website: momtazbh.co.uk

Momtaz Begum-Hossain (Bengali: মমতাজ বেগম-হোসেন; born 8 December 1981) is an English freelance journalist, craft expert, and presenter.

== Early life ==
Begum-Hossain was born and brought up in London, England. Her parents are from Bangladesh. She has three sisters.

Begum-Hossain graduated with a BA (Hons) in geography from the University of Sussex. She then graduated with a course in magazine journalism from Harlow College.

== Writing career ==
Begum-Hossain's interest in journalism began at school, where she set up two magazines. She was fashion editor of the University of Sussex student magazine Pulse and contributed to student newspaper the Badger. In her third year of university, she dropped out to become a carer. Within a year, she set up a handbag and accessories business based in her bedroom. After graduating from Harlow College, she worked as a junior writer for BBC Children's Magazines. She was then assistant editor and then editor of Popular Crafts magazine.

Since July 2007, Begum-Hossain has worked on a freelance basis, specialising in arts and crafts. She has written several craft books and contributed to numerous magazines. Her work has appeared in magazines for adult and child crafters. In January 2010, she was appointed by Asiana and Asiana Weddings magazines as a feature writer, covering topics including travel, fashion, celebrity, health, and careers. She then went on to become editorial director. She has also written for local and national press, including The Guardian and The Independent.

She has a blog called Craft and Travel. She previously had a blog called The Crafts Café published by Creative Choices, which is a career website for creative people. In 2006, her first book, Bollywood Crafts: 20 Projects Inspired by Popular Indian Cinema, was published. In 2012, her second book, 101+ Things to Do with Glitter, was published. In 2014, her third book, Kolkata to Kathmandu: Travelling tales from India, Bangladesh and Nepal, was published. Her fourth book, Hello Rainbow: Brighten up your life and mind with color therapy, was published in 2021.

== Crafts design ==
Begum-Hossain started working as a freelance crafts designer, customised clothing designer and crafts teacher running workshops. Since May 2012, she has run a craft night at the Hackney Attic called The Make Escape. She also runs craft workshops across the UK incorporating textiles, papercrafts, jewellery making and printing and dyeing. In 2011, she was invited to appear as one of Kirstie Allsopp's craft experts at The Handmade Fair in Hampton Court where she won a live Craft Mash-Up Challenge.

She has worked on several projects offering crafts consultancy services, including Hands on Craft in association with the Voluntary Arts Trust and has run craft workshops and private craft parties for children and adults.

== Media career ==
Begum-Hossain is also television and radio presenter. Her first presenting role was as a teenager on Channel 4 Child's Eye. She then became a regular guest contributor on the BBC's Network East TV series Café 21.

In 2011, she appeared on the BBC Two craft series Mastercrafts where she studied an apprenticeship in weaving. She was a video blogger for the Arts Council England during London 2012. Since March 2015, she has hosted Saturday morning breakfast show The Create Escape on One Harmony Radio, and been a reporter for Community Channel's The Greenwich Show.

She a regular live guest on BBC Asian Network where she reviews Bollywood films and discusses current affairs. In 2015, she was on the judging panel for the Asian Curry Awards.

In November 2015, she was interviewed by Nadia Ali on BBC Asian Network.

In January 2018 she launched The Desi Woman Podcast where she interviews game-changing South Asian women. Listen on iTunes, Spotify.

In September and December 2020 she Hosted The Handmade Festival, a three-day online crafts event.

In March 2021 she is holding an online colour festival to mark International Colour Day.

== Recognition ==
Begum-Hossain was Fashion Journalist of the Year 2019 at the British Bangladesh Fashion and Lifestyle Awards. She has also been named one of the Top 100 influential crafters in the UK. In October 2015, she was nominated for the TV Presenter of the Year at the Asian Media Awards.

== Personal life ==
Begum-Hossain is a Muslim. She lives in Greenwich, London. In 2003, her mother, Rehana Begum, died. In September 2010, her father died.

== Books ==
| Year | Title | Publisher | ISBN |
|---|---|---|---|
| 2006 | Bollywood Crafts: 20 Projects Inspired by Popular Indian Cinema | Guild of Master Craftsman Publications Ltd | 978-1861084187 |
| 2012 | 101 Things to Do with Glitter | Vivays Publishing Ltd | 978-1908126238 |
| 2014 | Kolkata to Kathmandu: Travelling tales from India, Bangladesh and Nepal | Self-published | N/A |
| 2021 | Rainbow: Brighten up your life and mind with color therapy | Leaping Hare Press | 978-0711266001 |

== See also ==
- British Bangladeshi
- List of British Bangladeshis
- List of English writers
- List of Muslim writers and poets
