= My Bollywood Wedding =

2010 novel by Rekha Waheed

- Author: Rekha Waheed
- Language: English, Bengali
- Genre: Romance, comedy
- Publisher: Little Black Dress
- Publication date: 9 December 2010
- Publication place: United Kingdom
- Media type: Print
- Pages: 252
- ISBN: 978-0755356140
- Preceded by: The A-Z Guide to Arranged Marriage

My Bollywood Wedding is a 2010 romantic comedy novel written by Rekha Waheed about a British Asian women's attempt to plan the perfect wedding.

== Development and themes ==
My Bollywood Wedding is a sequel to Waheed's first novel The A-Z Guide to Arranged Marriage.

In a February 2011 interview, Waheed said My Bollywood Wedding "addresses the pressures of interfering family members on Asian couples, the risks associated with turning Mr Right into Mr Forever and the financial burden of getting married these days" and "shows the realities of getting married in the modern day... but the underlying aim of the book is to show our women [Asian women] operate in a new modern era with a bit of sass."

== Release ==
My Bollywood Wedding was released by Little Black Dress on 9 December 2010.

== Critical response ==
Debs Carr of Novelicious.com said, "I liked this book, but did feel that Maya could have retaliated a little earlier against Seema's scheming and also would have liked to read more about Janghir. On the whole though it was a good read."

TheBookbag.co.uk said, "...you'll get a good story – but there's also an intelligent and thoughtful story in there..."

== See also ==
- Bengali Hindu wedding
- British Asian
