= Jelina Berlow-Rahman =

British solicitor (born 1980)

Jelina-Berlow Rahman
- জলিনা রহমান
- Born: Jelina Rahman; 4 January 1980 (age 46); Bangladesh
- Education: University of Strathclyde
- Occupation: Solicitor
- Years active: 2009–present
- Organization: Berlow Rahman Solicitors LLP (previously J R Rahman Solicitors)
- Spouse: Matthew Berlow
- Website: jrrahman.co.uk

Jelina Rahman-Berlow (née Rahman; Bengali: রহমান; born 4 January 1980) is a British solicitor whose practice J R Rahman Solicitors specialises in human rights, asylum, family and immigration legal advice and assistance.

== Early life ==
She was born in Bangladesh, came to the United Kingdom when she was eight months old and was brought up in Barnet, London where she attended Queen Elizabeth's School for Girls. In 1998, at the age of 18, she moved to Glasgow, Scotland to pursue a degree in law at the University of Strathclyde.

Rahman's paternal uncle fought in World War II as a seaman. Rahman's father came to the UK at the age of 15 and started his own restaurant, and now has a restaurant in Wimbledon.

In 1997, at the age of 17, Rahman was diagnosed with systemic lupus erythematosus (lupus), a chronic autoimmune illness which left her with scarred facial skin and inflamed kidneys. In 2005, at the age of 26, her kidneys failed and she was on dialysis at Glasgow Royal Infirmary three days a week for four years. Rahman was on chemotherapy for two years. In December 2009, at the age of 29, she received a kidney transplant.

== Career ==
Rahman required continuing hospital treatment since she qualified as a solicitor in December 2008. In 2009, she opened her own law firm J R Rahman Solicitors. She runs the firm single-handed, combining the roles of lawyer, receptionist, secretary and accountant while continuing with her dialysis treatment.

In 2009, J R Rahman Solicitors was listed in the Top 100 Business at the Barclays Trading Places Awards, a Government-backed national awards which honours for people who turn their lives around by choosing to start up a business. In the same year, it was awarded Up and Coming Law Firm of the Year at The Law Awards of Scotland. In October 2009, legal watchdogs gave permission for Rahman to work on cases and see clients while undergoing treatment.

== Awards ==
In 2005, Rahman, whilst working as a working in the Asylum Department at Livingstone Brown, Glasgow, she won the Empower Scotland Social Equality and Justice Award. In 2008, she was named as one of the 30 Under 30 promising lawyers in Scotland. In 2013, she was awarded Best Professional in Business at the Scottish Asian Business Awards. In January 2014, she was named among the British Bangladeshi Power & Inspiration 100 for demonstrating success and inspiration.

== Personal life ==
Rahman is a Muslim and is married to Matthew Berlow (born 1970) who is a fellow lawyer and is Jewish.

== See also ==
- British Bangladeshi
- List of British Bangladeshis
