= Sultan Choudhury =

English banker, chartered accountant

Sultan Choudhury OBE
- সুলতান আহমেদ লতিফ
- Born: Sultan Ahmed Choudhury; Birmingham, West Midlands, England
- Education: University of Nottingham; Aston Business School
- Occupations: Banker, chartered accountant
- Years active: 1994–present

Sultan Ahmed Choudhury (Bengali: সুলতান আহমেদ চৌধুরী) is an English banker, chartered accountant and was the chief executive officer of Al Rayan Bank (formerly Islamic Bank of Britain).

== Early life ==
In 1994, Choudhury graduated with a BA (Hons) in Economics and Econometrics from the University of Nottingham. His interest in Islamic finance began at this time. In 2001, he graduated with distinction in MBA from Aston Business School.

After qualifying as a chartered accountant, his desire to enter the field of Islamic finance became clear when he went on Hajj (the largest Islamic pilgrimage to Mecca, Saudi Arabia) in 2002.

== Career ==
From July 1994, Choudhury worked in Assurance and Advisory Practice at Deloitte & Touche. From September 1998 to December 2003, he was Director of brokerage operations at Charles Schwab Europe and Barclays Private Bank.

In January 2004, Choudhury joined the founding management team of the Islamic Bank of Britain (IBB), the first dedicated Islamic bank in the West. He was appointed Commercial Director in June 2007. He set up the Islamic Bank of Britain's Head Office Operations and Branch Network and has led the development and implementation of the bank's product range and service delivery channels. In 2014, he was appointed CEO. He left the bank in April 2019.

Choudhury is a member of various Community and Government advisory groups and has contributed to the development of Islamic Financial Services in the United Kingdom. He is a Chartered Member of the Chartered Institute for Securities & Investment (for whom he sits on the Employer Panel for the Islamic Finance Qualification).

Choudhury is a Trustee of the National Zakat Foundation, a British charity which distributes zakat to those living in poverty as well as granting funding to community organisations and initiatives.

As of 2019, Choudhury has taken on a number of Board positions, including Advisor at Precept Finance, a sharia-compliant finance brokerage service. Choudhury is also the Executive Chairman of Waqfinity, an endowment trust focussed on charitable giving.

In 2019, The Times published an article titled "Female Circumcision is like clipping a nail, claimed speaker". The article featured a photo of Choudhury beside the headline, leading some readers to incorrectly infer that Choudhury had made the comment. Choudhury lodged a complaint with the Independent Press Standards Organisation and sued The Times for libel. In 2020, The Times issued an apology, amended its article and agreed to pay Choudhury damages and legal costs.

== Honours ==
Choudhury was appointed Officer of the Order of the British Empire (OBE) in the 2017 Birthday Honours for services to the UK market for Islamic finance.
