= Siraj Ali =

Bangladeshi-born British restaurateur

- মুহাম্মদ সিরাজ আলি
- Born: Muhammad Siraj Ali; 24 November 1955 (age 70); East Pakistan
- Occupation: Restaurateur
- Years active: 1979–present
- Spouse: Begum Momtaj Khanom
- Children: 4
- Website: www.maharajagroup.co.uk

Muhammad Siraj Ali (Bengali: মুহাম্মদ সিরাজ আলি; born 24 November 1954) is a Bangladeshi-born British restaurateur and philanthropist.

== Career ==
In 1979, Ali bought the New Curry Centre in Stanford-le-Hope. At the time, Ali's family was the first Bengali family in Thurrock, Essex.

Ali runs the Maharaja restaurant in South Benfleet, Essex. Since 1991, the restaurant has held charity nights, raising close to £2 million for hundreds of charitable causes, including the Multiple Sclerosis Society, NSPCC, British Red Cross and Breast Cancer Awareness, amongst others. Ali has been involved in the Indian catering industry since the 1970s, with a career spanning 40 years.

Ali is the founder chairman of both the Thurrock Bangladesh Welfare Association and the Thurrock Islamic Educational Cultural Centre. He is the general secretary of the Castle Point Bangladeshi Education and Cultural Centre, as well as governor of the Hajji Soyed Ali Primary School and the chairman of the advisory committee of the Essex Bangladesh Welfare Association.

He is chairman of the Interim Committee Arbitrator and former treasurer of the Balagonj Education Trust, which aims to provide life skills and education to disadvantaged children in Bangladesh. He is also vice-chairman of The Bangladeshi Catering Association (Essex region).

== Awards and recognition ==
In 2009, Ali won the Channel S Award for years of charity work in south Essex. In 2011, he was awarded the British Bangladeshi Who's Who 'Outstanding Contribution' Award for his long standing contribution to the hospitality and catering industry.

In 2009, Ali was the joint winner of the Bangladesh Caterers Association's 'Caterer of the Year' for the South East. In 2015, he was awarded the Lifetime Achievement Award by Curry Life magazine.

== Personal life ==
Ali lives in Stanford-le-Hope, Essex. He is married to Begum Momtaj Khanom, and they have one son, Ansar, and three daughters, Shahena (who is a celebrity television chef on The Food Channel), Shareena and Jasmine.

Ali has arranged around 200 charity events per year for 20 years, raising around £600 to £1,500 an event. It is estimated that he has helped raise £3 million for charity.

== See also ==
- British Bangladeshi
- Business of British Bangladeshis
- List of British Bangladeshis
