= Taff Rahman =

English football manager (born 1983)

Taffazul Islam Rahman (25 December 1983) is an English football manager. He grew up in the London Borough of Camden.

== Career ==
=== Playing career ===
As a youth player, Rahman joined the youth academy of English third tier side Luton. After that, he joined the youth academy of QPR in the English second tier. After that, he joined the youth academy of English Premier League club Arsenal. Where he graduated through as a schoolboy and played in the youth and reserve team set up.

=== Managerial and Coaching Career ===
In 2007, Rahman was appointed youth academy coach at Arsenal in the English Premier League. In the summer of 2012 he completed the UEFA A license qualification with the English FA. In 2013, Rahman was appointed manager of the youth academy of Tottenham in the English Premier League. In 2018, he was appointed assistant manager of Guyana and made history by qualifying for the Gold Cup for the first time in the country's history.

In recent years Rahman has coached with England Youth National teams, continues to lead and deliver across the FA National coaching and Talent ID courses, alongside his role as a National Coach Developer. Which entails supporting academy coaches with their development, working closely with the clubs and their senior staff and management to implement successful long term player development programmes.
