= Muquim Ahmed =

Bangladeshi-born British entrepreneur (born 1954)

- Born: 1 September 1954 (age 71); Sylhet District, East Bengal, Pakistan
- Other names: King of Brick Lane
- Education: Production engineering
- Occupation: Entrepreneur
- Notable work: Café Naz restaurants

Muquim Ahmed (born 1 September 1954) is a Bangladeshi-born British entrepreneur. He is thought to be the first Brick Lane millionaire.

== Biography ==
Ahmed arrived in East London in the early 1970s, aged 19, to study engineering with the intention of returning to join the family business in Bangladesh.

Having invested £2 million in a bakery and a ready meals factory in South West London, Ahmed, 55, is building a food manufacturing leg to his property and restaurant portfolio. Best known for his work in transforming the Brick Lane area of East London, later helped his father export goods from Britain and the Netherlands to Bangladesh. He diversified into property and was a millionaire at 26. He has a £30m property portfolio while his Café Naz chain of restaurants turns over about £3.5 million a year. His other interests include a travel agency.

Ahmed is also a fellow of The University of London.

== See also ==
- British Bangladeshi
- Business of British Bangladeshis
- List of British Bangladeshis
