= Forced Marriage (Civil Protection) Act 2007 =

Act of the Parliament of the United Kingdom

Forced Marriage (Civil Protection) Act 2007 (Note: Section 4(1).)
- Act of Parliament
- Parliament of the United Kingdom
- Long title: An Act to make provision for protecting individuals against being forced to enter into marriage without their free and full consent and for protecting individuals who have been forced to enter into marriage without such consent; and for connected purposes.
- Citation: 2007 c. 20
- Introduced by: Lord Lester of Herne Hill (private member's bill) (Lords)
- Territorial extent: England and Wales; Northern Ireland; (Note: Section 4(6)–(8).)

Dates
- Royal assent: 26 July 2007
- Commencement: Various (Note: Section 4(2)–(5).)
Other legislation
Amends	Senior Courts Act 1981; Courts and Legal Services Act 1990

Status: Amended

History of passage through Parliament

Text of statute as originally enacted

Revised text of statute as amended

The Forced Marriage (Civil Protection) Act 2007 (c. 20) is an act of the Parliament of the United Kingdom. It seeks to assist victims of forced marriage, or those threatened with forced marriage, by providing civil remedies. It extends to England and Wales and Northern Ireland – it does not extend to Scotland, as this is a devolved competence.

== Forced marriage protection order ==
The centrepiece of the Act is the forced marriage protection order (FMPO). A person threatened with forced marriage can apply to court for a forced marriage order can contain whatever provisions which the court finds would be appropriate to prevent the forced marriage from taking place, or to protect a victim of forced marriage from its effects, and may include such measures as confiscation of passport or restrictions on contact with the victim. The subject of a forced marriage order can be not just the person to whom the forced marriage will occur, but also any other person who aids, abets or encourages the forced marriage. A marriage can be considered forced not merely on the grounds of threats of physical violence to the victim, but also through threats of physical violence to third parties (e.g. the victim's family), or even self-violence (e.g. marriage procured through threat of suicide.) A person who violates a force marriage order is subject to contempt of court proceedings and may be arrested.

== History ==
It was introduced as a private member's bill into the House of Lords by Lord Lester of Herne Hill on the 16 November 2006. It was passed by the House of Lords on 13 June 2007, passed by the House of Commons on the 17 July 2007, and received royal assent on 26 July 2007. Unusually, although this was a private member's bill, almost the entire contents of the bill was replaced by Government amendments in the Grand Committee, with the support of Lord Lester.

The act modified practices heretofore governed by the Family Law Act 1996; punishment of FMPO offences is further detailed in Part 10 of the Anti-social Behaviour, Crime and Policing Act 2014.

Prior to this the Children Act 1989 section 8 could be used by local authorities to issue a prohibited steps order to prevent parents from taking a child to get forcibly married.
