= Q News (British magazine) =

- Categories: Islam, current affairs, politics, culture
- Frequency: Monthly
- Founder: Fuad Nahdi
- Founded: March 1992
- First issue: March 1992
- Final issue: 2011
- Company: Q-News Media Limited
- Country: United Kingdom
- Based in: London, England
- Language: English
- Website: www.q-news.com

Q-News is a defunct British monthly magazine organised around themes mostly pertinent to Muslims.

== Content ==
Q-News was founded by its then chief editor, Fuad Nahdi, and was published by Q-News Media Limited in March 1992. The magazine was a small, independent, monthly magazine, which had an online and print version. It was created as a fortnightly tabloid publication before it evolved into a monthly magazine format. The magazine was disestablished in October 2011.

The magazine was representative of alternative-commercial media with independent ownership combined with a political and religious mission. It provided a mix of lifestyle and information featuring cultural, political, religious stories focusing on their relevance to Muslims around the world. It provided independent analysis, critique, and review of current affairs, politics, culture, ideas and spirituality. It engaged in a political struggle for civil liberties, rights, political participation, and inclusion of Muslims in British society. It focused on issues and themes of common concern to Muslims.

The magazine was politically independent and not financed by any one particular country or regime. It received financial support primarily from advertising and subscriptions; its advertising revenue came mostly from private Islamic companies and charity organisations.

Each issue had between 50 and 78 pages and a print run of 20,000. Q-News had staff of 60 unpaid people, 30 of whom were journalists, 27 were freelancers, and three were writers.

== See also ==
- Islam in the United Kingdom
