= List of restaurateurs =

This is a list of restaurateurs. A restaurateur is a person who opens and runs restaurants professionally. Although over time the term has come to describe any person who owns a restaurant, traditionally it refers to a highly skilled professional who is proficient in all aspects of the restaurant business.

== Restaurateurs ==
- Gastón Acurio
- Pius Alibek Hermez
- Alex Atala
- Askar Baitassov
- Eddie Blay
- Marcel Boulestin
- Norman E. Brinker
- Ion Luca Caragiale
- Engracia Cruz-Reyes
- Teun van Dijck
- Gato Dumas
- Robert Earl
- Guy Fieri
- Will Guidara
- Károly Gundel
- Juan José Gutiérrez
- Ching Hai
- Leopold Hawelka
- Jean-Pierre Koepp
- Jimmy Lahoud
- Brian McKenna
- Georges Mora
- Ken Oringer
- Ioan Gyuri Pascu
- Jacky Robert
- Sakis Rouvas
- Wilhelmina Skogh
- Eduardo Sousa
- Stephen Starr
- Jean-Philippe Susilovic
- Chin-hui Tsao
- Oscar Tschirky
- Mór Ungerleider
- Virgilio Martínez Véliz
- Cajsa Wahllund

== By nationality ==
=== Australia ===
- George Calombaris
- Andrew Cibej
- Pete Evans
- Manu Feildel
- Shanaka Fernando
- Michelle Garnaut
- Guy Grossi
- Peter Kuruvita
- Karen Martini
- Gary Mehigan
- Matt Moran
- Mietta O'Donnell
- Rocco Pantaleo
- Tetsuya Wakuda
- Samuel Wynn
- Yip Ho Nung
- Gum Yuen

=== Austria ===
- Arnold Schwarzenegger

=== Bahrain ===
- Tala Bashmi

=== Brazil ===
- Robert Falkenburg

=== Canada ===
- Hugh Acheson
- Shereen Arazm
- Sean Avery
- Nat Bailey
- Joe Beef
- Massimo Capra
- Maggie Cassella
- Christy Chung
- Lynn Crawford
- Meeru Dhalwala
- Danica d'Hondt
- Stefano Faita
- Rob Feenie
- Ryan Gosling
- Wayne Gretzky
- Ryan Holmes
- Hector Jimenez-Bravo
- Harry Kambolis
- Jamie Kennedy
- Susur Lee
- Brad Long
- Mark McEwan
- Robert J. Patterson
- Duke Redbird
- Tim Rozon
- Joey Ghazal
- Guy Rubino
- Michael Smith
- Marc Thuet
- Vikram Vij
- Stephen Yan
- Zal Yanovsky
- Maurice Zbriger

=== Denmark ===
- Silla Bjerrum
- Jan Friis-Mikkelsen
- Sven and Lene Grønlykke
- Rasmus Kofoed
- Claus Meyer
- Adam Price
- René Redzepi
- Lertchai Treetawatchaiwong

=== El Salvador ===
- Graciela de Holman

=== Eswatini ===
- Philippa Mdluli

=== France ===
- Antoine Beauvilliers
- Louis Bignon
- Georges Blanc
- Raymond Blanc
- Paul Bocuse
- Joël Dupuch
- Stéphane Froidevaux
- Jean Galatoire
- Jacques Genin
- Michel Guérard
- Jean Joho
- Ludo Lefebvre
- Édouard Loubet
- Sébastien Masi
- Michel Michaud
- Jean-Christophe Novelli
- Claude Philippe
- Thierry Rautureau
- Stéphane Reynaud
- Kilien Stengel
- Jean Sulpice
- Pierre Troisgros
- Roger Vergé

=== Germany ===
- Lorenz Adlon
- Eitel Brothers
- Vincent Klink
- Silvio Kuhnert
- Paul Merker
- Kadir Nurman

=== Hong Kong ===
- Vicky Lau

=== India ===
- Ritu Dalmia
- Ketan Kadam
- Prahlad Kakkar
- J.K. Kapur
- Farrokh Khambata
- Kumar Mahadevan
- Manish Makhija
- P. Rajagopal
- Vivek Singh
- Cyrus Todiwala
- Nelson Wang

=== Italy ===
- Emilio Baglioni
- Massimo Bottura
- Salvatore Cuomo
- Toni Dalli
- Pino Luongo
- Sirio Maccioni
- Modesto Marini
- Lucia Pavin

=== Japan ===
- Hiroaki Aoki
- Toshiro Kandagawa
- Yoshihiro Narisawa
- Nui Onoue

=== Lithuania ===
- Linas Tadas Karosas
- Tadas Karosas

=== Mexico ===
- Cesar Balsa
- Caesar Cardini
- Eduardo Santamarina

=== New Zealand ===
- Des Britten
- Vernon Lawrence Clare
- Stanley Nicholas Garland
- Jack Macdonald

=== Nigeria ===
- Bolanle Austen-Peters
- Muma Gee
- Kehinde Kamson
- Nike Oshinowo

=== Norway ===
- Ole Jonny Eikefjord
- Julius Fritzner
- Eyvind Hellstrøm
- Kari Innerå
- Einar Rose
- Christen Sveaas

=== Pakistan ===
- Zubaida Tariq

=== Russia ===
- Anatoly Komm

=== Spain ===
- Cesar Balsa

=== Sweden ===
- Gustafva Björklund
- Niklas Ekstedt
- Carl Jan Granqvist
- Marcus Samuelsson

=== Thailand ===
- Gaggan

=== Turkey ===
- Hüseyin Özer
- Nusret Gökçe

=== United Kingdom ===
- Muquim Ahmed
- Enam Ali
- Kaniz Ali
- Siraj Ali
- Jamie Barber
- Aldo Berni
- Frank Berni
- Mark Birley
- Peter Boizot
- Vito Cataffo
- Foysol Choudhury
- Peter Evans
- John Maria Gatti
- Rose Gray
- Nick Jones
- Omar Khan
- Joel Kissin
- Atul Kochhar
- Abdul Latif
- Alvin Leung
- Magnus Lindgren
- Simon Loftus
- Tommy Miah
- David Moore
- Timothy Moxon
- Alan Murchison
- Jean-Christophe Novelli
- Hüseyin Özer
- Claude Philippe
- Gordon Ramsay
- Bajloor Rashid
- Mandy Rice-Davies
- Egon Ronay
- Mohammed Sabir
- Siegi Sessler
- Lisa Vanderpump
- Iqbal Wahhab
- Marco Pierre White
- Sarah Willingham
- Simon Wright
- Alan Yau

==== England ====
- Jill Adams
- Amjad Bashir
- Walter Baxter
- Aiden Byrne
- Lee Chapman
- Atique Choudhury
- Terence Conran
- Robert Earl
- Keith Floyd
- Jeff Galvin
- Damien Hirst
- Aktar Islam
- Disley Jones
- Keith McNally
- Mary-Ellen McTague
- Thomasina Miers
- Jamie Oliver
- Sid Owen
- James Pimm
- Vaughan Smith

==== Scotland ====
- Bashir Ahmad
- Mac Henderson

== By type ==
=== Restaurant founders ===
- Robert Earl
- Adam Fleischman
- Gordon Hamersley
- Prue Leith
- Juanita Musson
- David M. Overton
- Bob Payton
- Melissa Perello
- P. Rajagopal
- Daniel R. Scoggin
- Lydia Shire
- Jasper White

==== Fast casual chain founders ====
- Gus Boulis
- Leeann Chin
- Arthur Cores
- Steve Ells

==== Fast-food chain founders ====
- Dave Barham
- Burt Baskin
- Glen Bell
- Samuel Truett Cathy
- Derek Cha
- Blake Chanslor
- Andrew Cherng
- George W. Church, Sr.
- Al Copeland
- Lucia Cunanan
- Fred DeLuca
- David Edgerton
- Tom Forkner
- Jack Fulk
- Todd Graves
- Murray Handwerker
- Nathan Handwerker
- Wilber Hardee
- Pete Harman
- Tim Horton
- Howard Deering Johnson
- Ron Joyce
- Carl Karcher
- Margaret Karcher
- Daniel J. Kim
- Ray Kroc
- Young Lee
- Gust E. Lundberg
- Pat McDonagh
- Richard and Maurice McDonald
- James McLamore
- Hugh Morris
- Albert Okura
- Robert O. Peterson
- Harold Pierce
- Irv Robbins
- Joe Rogers, Sr.
- William Rosenberg
- Vernon Rudolph
- Nabi Saleh
- Colonel Sanders
- Ike Sewell
- Troy Smith
- Esther Snyder
- Harry Snyder
- Felix Stehling
- Brody Sweeney
- Tony Tan
- Dave Thomas
- Lovie Yancey

==== Pizza chain founders ====
- Nolan Bushnell
- Dan and Frank Carney
- Aaron Fechter
- Carol Grimaldi
- Marian Ilitch
- Mike Ilitch
- Sherwood Johnson
- Gennaro Lombardi
- Tom Monaghan
- John Schnatter
- Ken Selby
- William Theisen

== See also ==
- Lists of Michelin-starred restaurants
