= Blaine Hurst =

Entrepreneur, businessman, and restaurateur

- Education: Indiana University Bloomington
- Occupation: CEO of Panera Bread
- Years active: 1978–present
- Spouse: Rebecca Hurst
- Children: 1

Blaine Hurst is an entrepreneur, businessman, and restaurateur. Currently, Hurst is President and Chief Executive Officer of Panera, LLC. Hurst was named Chief Executive Officer of Panera effective January 1, 2018, following the chain's acquisition by JAB Holdings in July 2017 for roughly $7.5 billion, and served as its President since December 2016.

== Career ==
Hurst has nearly 25 years of restaurant experience from operating individual restaurants to leading two of the largest restaurants in the U.S.

Hurst joined Panera in late 2010 to begin the "Panera 2.0” digital transformation initiative, which launched in 2014, to improve the guest experience. With more than $100 million invested in technology and operations, Hurst helped redesigned how cafes and kitchens operate, created the systems and technology infrastructure to support multiple digital ordering channels including web, catering, delivery, mobile apps and in-store kiosks. Today, Panera currently processes more than 30% of its orders digitally with digital sales surpassing $2B by end of 2018.

Since Hurst joined Panera, he has led a food-tech makeover having fully rolled out Panera 2.0; launched nationwide delivery and hired more than 10,000 associates to support this initiative.

Hurst previously served as President, Restaurant Technology Solutions LLC, a division of eMac Digital. eMac Digital was a joint venture of McDonald's Corporation, Accel Partners and KKR, and was chartered with building and deploying a new technology model for the restaurant industry.

Before eMac, Hurst was Vice Chairman and President of Papa John's International Inc., one of the largest pizza chains in the world, after having held a series of executive roles including Executive Vice President, Chief Administrative Officer and Vice President, Information Services. He also helped lead the development and implementation of the first nationwide online food ordering system in 1998, as well as an in-store management and delivery system. Now digital represents more than 50% of the business at Papa John's. Earlier in his career, before joining Boston Chicken, now known as Boston Market, as its Vice President, Information Services, Hurst was a consulting division Partner with Ernst & Young, founding the firm's Center for Information Technology Planning and Development.

== Boards ==
Currently, Hurst sits on the Women in Food Service Forum Board, is a part of the Restaurant Advisory Council for Google and on the Industry Advisory Board at azeti Networks (loT) in Berlin, Germany.
