= Kuhnert =

Kuhnert is a German surname. Notable people with the surname include:

- Alfred Kuhnert (1898–1977), German Wehrmacht general
- Hans Kuhnert (1901–1974), German actor, art director and production designer
- Silvio Kuhnert (born 1969), German singer
- Wilhelm Kuhnert (1865–1926), German painter, writer and illustrator

== See also ==
- Kühnert
- Kuhnert Arboretum, an arboretum in Aberdeen, South Dakota
