= Kühnert =

Kühnert or Kuehnert is a German surname. Notable people with the surname include:

- Ernst Gustav Kühnert (1885–1961), Estonian architect and art historian
- Floé Kühnert (born 1984), German pole vaulter
- Kevin Kühnert (born 1989), German politician
- Phenix Kühnert, German actress and activist
- Steffi Kühnert (born 1963), German actress

== See also ==
- Kuhnert
