= Feast of San Gennaro =

Annual Christian festival of Saint Januarius

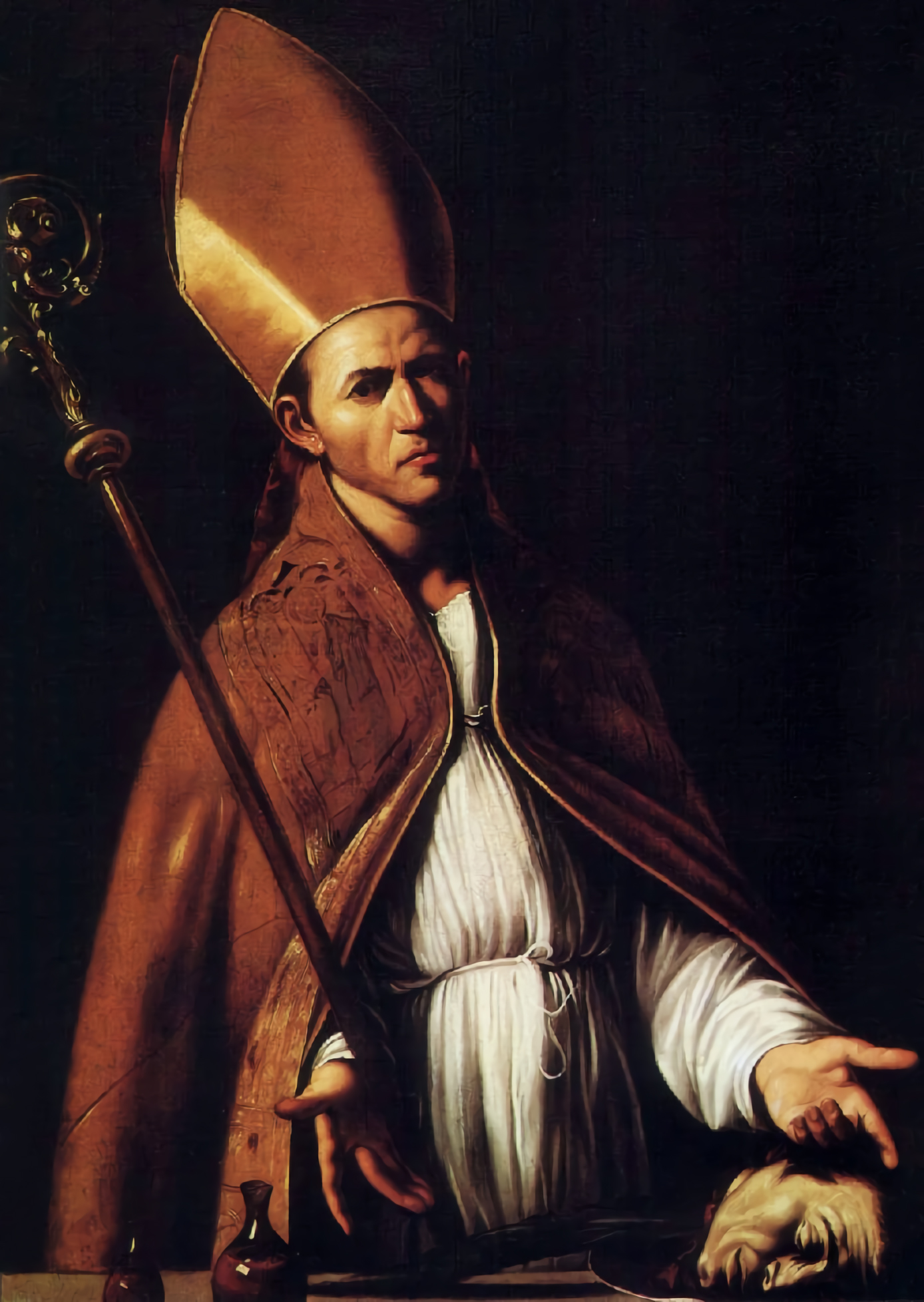
Saint Gennaro, bishop and martyr, by Caravaggio

The Feast of San Gennaro (in Italian: Festa di San Gennaro), also known as San Gennaro Festival, is a Neapolitan and Italian-American patronal festival dedicated to Saint Januarius, patron saint of Naples and Little Italy in Lower Manhattan.

His feast is celebrated on 19 September in the calendar of the Catholic Church. (Note: In the 1498 Roman martyrology, his martyrdom took place on the thirteenth day before the kalends of October, that is 19 September.)

In the United States, the "Festa of San Gennaro" is also a highlight of the year for New York's Little Italy, with the saint's polychrome statue carried through the middle of a street fair stretching for blocks.

== In Italy ==
=== History ===
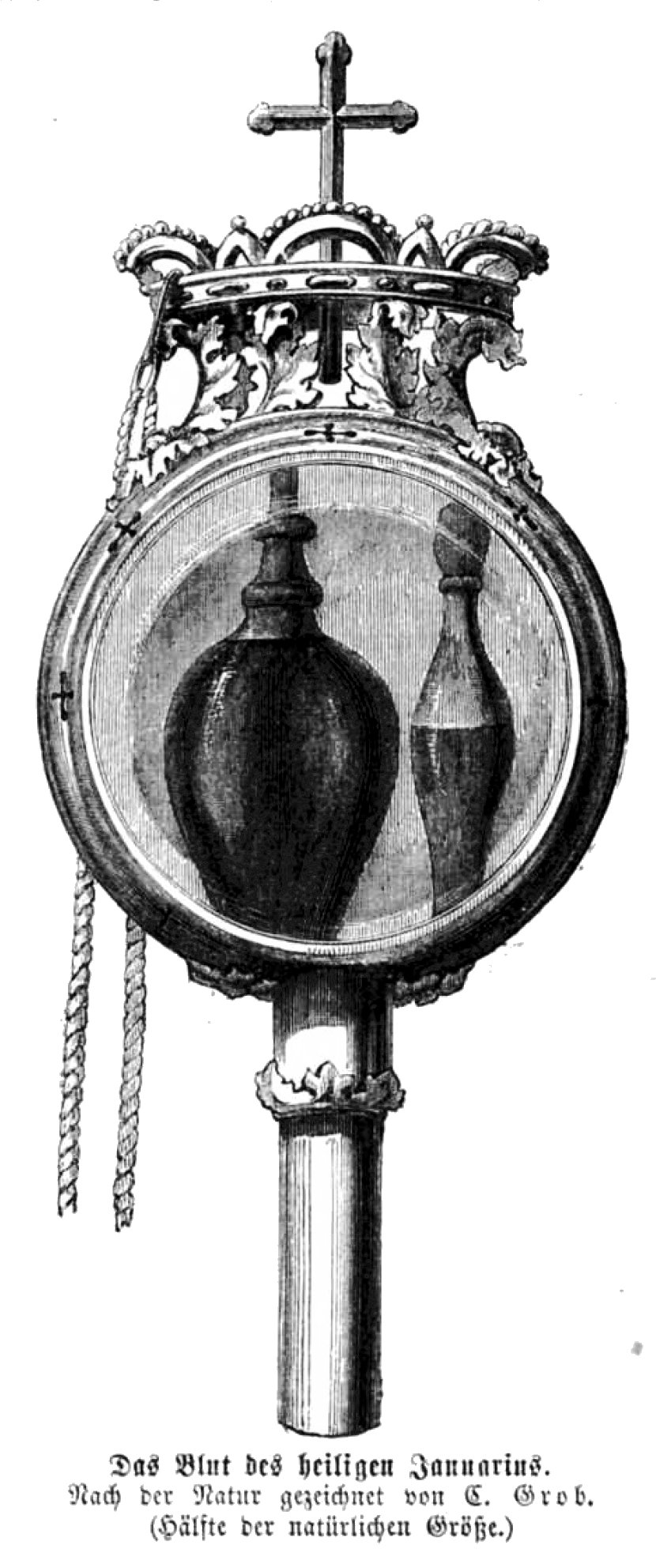
Drawing of the reliquary containing the two ampoules said to hold Januarius' blood, c. 1860

On 19 September 305, Gennaro (Latin: Ianuarius), bishop of Benevento, was beheaded in Pozzuoli during the persecution of Christians by Diocletian. (Note: According to the Atti bolognesi, (Note: Atti bolognesi: early documents conserved in a codex dating from 1180; kept at the Celestine monastery of Santo Stefano in Bologna.) while in prison to visit two incarcerated brothers, he too was arrested together with Festo and Desiderio, by order of the judge Dragonzio. Gennaro was forced to confess his faith and sentenced to death. Initially, the set punishment was to be eaten alive by the animals of the Anfiteatro Flavio of Pozzuoli, but it was changed to decapitation after that, according to tradition, the saint managed to calm down the beasts that were meant to divour him. He was decapitated in the surroundings of Pozzuoli's Solfatara in a place that they used to call Foro di Vulcano.) According to the legend,

The blood gushed due to the decapitation was collected and kept in an ampoule by Eusebia, who had been his wet nurse. In 313, the martyr's body was being moved to Naples, and the procession stopped to rest in what would be today's piazza Bernini, in the area known as Vomero. Eusebia put the vials containing the martyr's blood near his head, and the blood started to melt, at the presence of the local bishop.

San Gennaro was named patron and protector of the city, and is invoked by the people of Naples on several occasions, e.g. to ask for help, healing and special favors; memorably, he was called on to stop the 1631 eruption of Mount Vesuvius, and the lava – that was about to destroy the towns around it – slowed down. Meanwhile, with very few exceptions, (Note: In some rare cases – concurrently with cataclismic events, e.g. in 1528, the year the French sieged Naples and the pest broke out – the miracle of San Gennaro does not occur, or it happens before the vials are taken out of the special closet that for centuries has regulated the ritual display and collective wait of the miracle.) the blood miracle happens again and again, three times a year:

1. the Saturday prior the first Sunday of May – the day when the saint's body was transferred from Pozzuoli to Naples;
2. on 19 September – the day of his martyrdom;
3. and, finally, on 16 December – date when the saint interceded to end the 1631 eruption of Mount Vesuvius.

=== Celebration ===
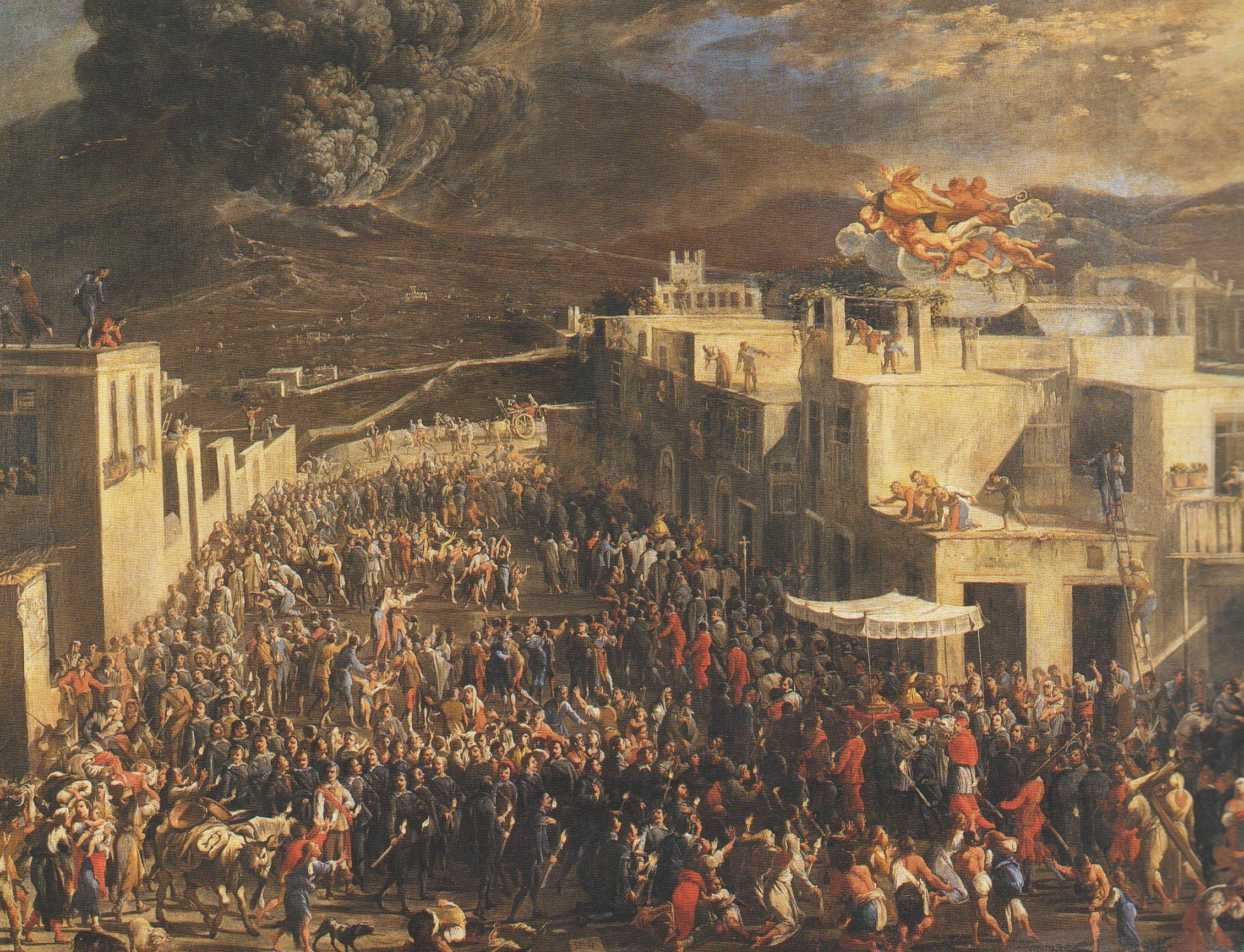
San Gennaro's procession in Naples, during the 1631 eruption of Mount Vesuvius

In Naples and neighboring areas, an annual celebration and feast of faith is held over the course of three days, commemorating Saint Gennaro. Throughout the festival, parades, religious processions and musical entertainment are featured.

The focus of the celebration is the miracle of San Gennaro's blood melting, also simply known as the miracle of San Gennaro, or blood miracle.

== In the United States ==
=== Little Italy, Manhattan ===
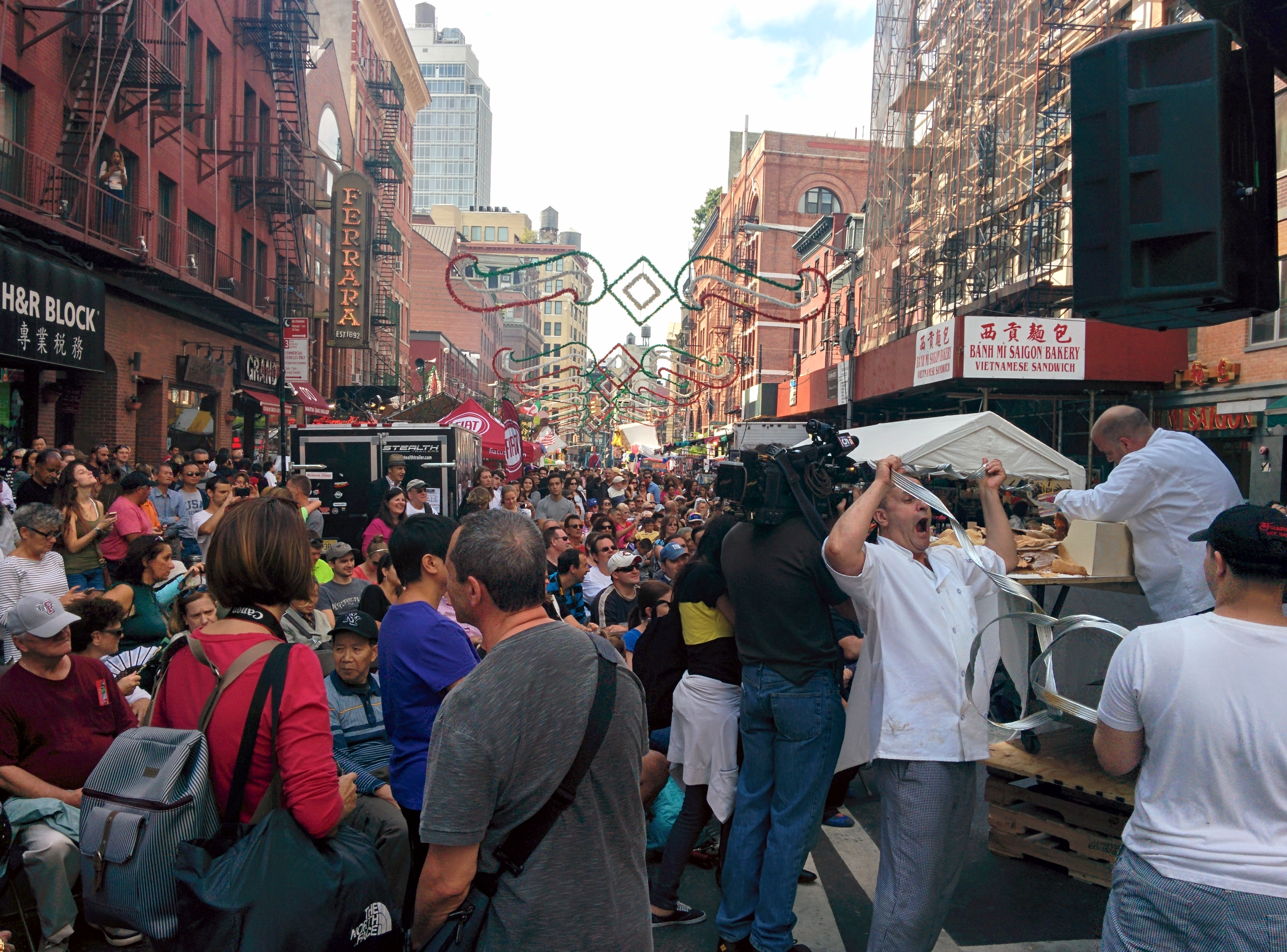
Looking north at Mulberry Street during the 2014 festival. To the right the Little Italy Bakery can be seen constructing what became the world's largest cannolo.

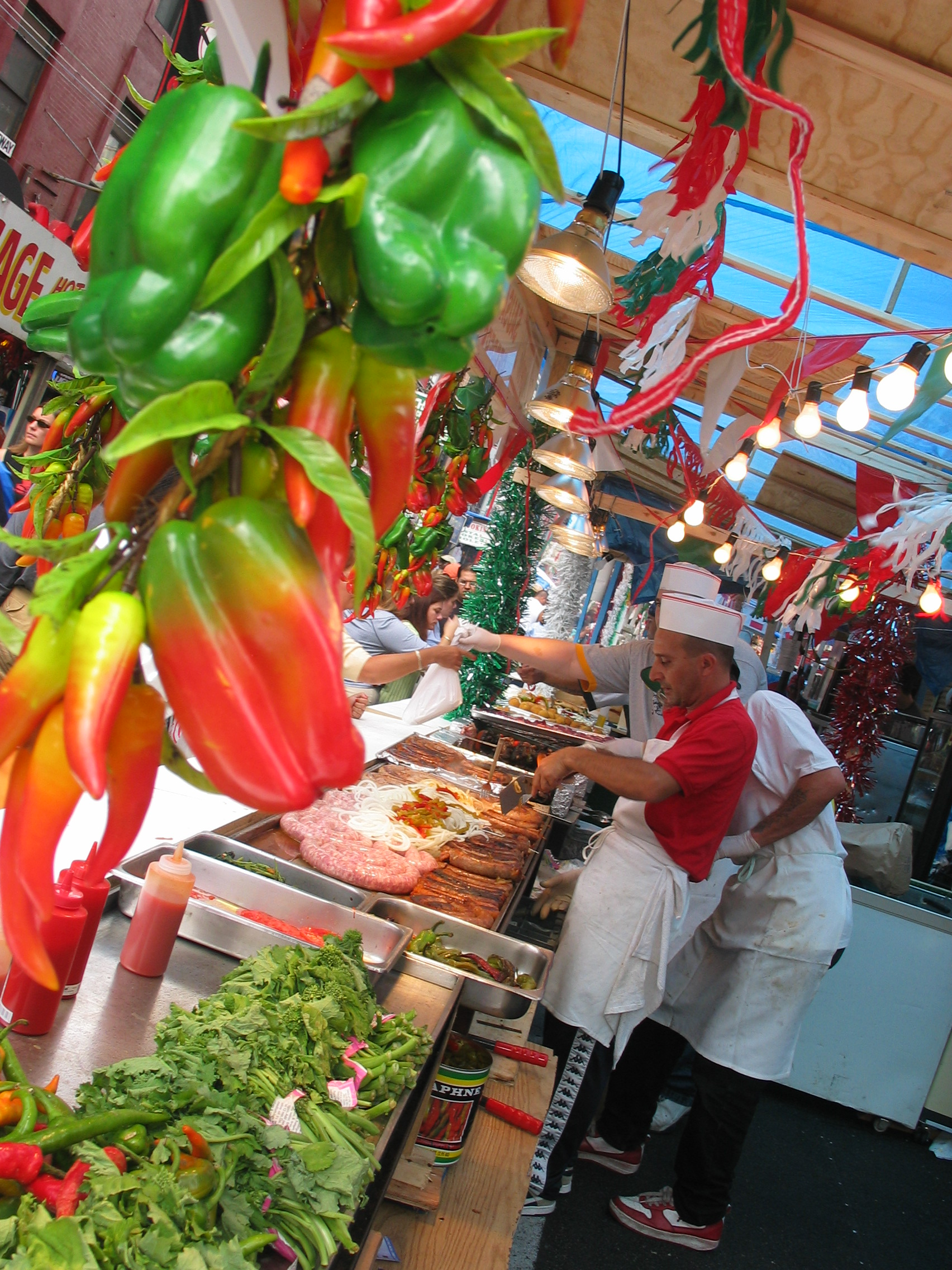
Street vendors, as hawkers are referred to in the United States, particularly in New York City, sell food at the Feast of San Gennaro in Little Italy, in Lower Manhattan.

The festival was first celebrated in the United States in September 1926, when immigrants from Naples congregated along Mulberry Street in the Little Italy section of Manhattan in New York City to continue the tradition they had followed in Italy to celebrate Saint Januarius, the Patron Saint of Naples.

The immigrant families on Mulberry Street who started the feast, a group of cafe owners, erected a small chapel in the street to house the image of their patron Saint. They invited all to partake of their wares, asking the devoted to pin an offering to the ribbon streamers that are hung from the statue's apron. This money was then distributed to poorer people in the neighborhood. Originally a one-day religious commemoration, over time, the festival expanded into an 11-day street fair organized and run by people outside the neighborhood. It is now an annual celebration of food and drink, and a major tourist attraction.

Centered on Mulberry Street, which is closed to traffic for the occasion, the festival generally features sausages, zeppole, street vendors, games, parades and other such attractions. The Grand Procession is held starting at 2 p.m. on the last Saturday of the feast, immediately after a celebratory Mass at the Church of the Most Precious Blood. This is a Roman Catholic candlelit procession in which the statue of San Gennaro is carried from its permanent home in the Most Precious Blood Church through the streets of Little Italy.

Another festival is held with the same attractions in New York City's other Little Italy, in the Fordham/Belmont community in the Bronx. The streets are closed to traffic, and the festivities begin early in the morning and proceed late into the night.

==== Corruption ====
In 1995, following the exposure of financial improprieties and mafia involvement, New York City Mayor Rudy Giuliani declared that if the city's San Gennaro festival did not remove corrupt elements, he would shut it down. After Giuliani's ultimatum, a community group was formed to manage the festival; the municipal government asked it to hire a professional manager, and it hired Mort Berkowitz to be the financial manager.

=== Other locations ===
Similar festivals have also been sponsored in other cities.

In 1980, Vincent Jimmy Palmisano brought the Feast of San Gennaro to the Las Vegas Valley, Nevada, for the first time. The event was hosted and entertained by Tony Sacca from 1986 to 2016, along with celebrities from the strip such as Pat Cooper, Ernest Borgnine, Jerry Vale, Liberace, and Frankie Avalon. The Las Vegas festival is now held twice a year, in the Spring and Fall. This bi-annual festival features traditional Italian cuisine, amusement rides and games, and entertainers such as Emilio Baglioni, Chazz Palminteri, Tommy DeVito, and Louis Prima's daughter, Lena Prima.

In 2002, Jimmy Kimmel, Adam Carolla, and Doug DeLuca founded the Feast of San Gennaro Los Angeles, which is now a major annual event held every September in Hollywood.

In 2011, Hampton Bays (Long Island, New York) started their San Gennaro celebration. It has since grown rapidly to become the largest San Gennaro Feast on Long Island, and second only to the Little Italy Feast in New York State. The Hampton Bays Feast of San Gennaro draws a huge crowd, with live bands, raffles and prizes, and vendors selling food and drink. (Note: Though the Hampton Bays San Gennaro took a hiatus for COVID concerns, it was scheduled to return from 2022.)

In 2012, the Feast of San Gennaro of the Jersey Shore was established in Belmar, New Jersey, by Daniel Di Cesare, whose goal was to highlight the positive contributions of Italian Americans.

In 2013, the San Gennaro Festival was brought to Seattle, Washington, by the Mascio family, who formed the San Gennaro Foundation Seattle. Held the second week of September, it includes the procession of the San Gennaro statue, live music and food. This three day festival is held in the heart of the Georgetown neighborhood in southern Seattle, where many of the city's Italian community settled when they first arrived in Seattle.

== In popular culture ==
- The feast features prominently in the second entry of Francis Ford Coppola's cinematic opus, The Godfather Part II (1974), serving as backdrop to a young Vito Corleone murdering the Don Fanucci character. In The Godfather Part III (1990), Vincent Corleone assassinates Joey Zasa at the festa.
- It was a crime scene on CSI: NY in the season 2 episode "Corporate Warriors".
- It was also featured prominently in the 1973 movie Mean Streets.
- It is mentioned in the song "Sad Nights" by Blue Rodeo.
- In "The Ride" (Season 6 Episode 9 of The Sopranos) Tony, Carmela, and several other members of the family attend a fictitious festival in Newark patterned after this feast. It is the Feast of Elzéar of Sabran which also has a connection with Naples and is celebrated on September 27.
- Brian Altano tells a story about the (few) differences between the New Jersey festival and the Italian festival in The GameSpy Debriefings episode 158.
- On The Golden Girls, in the episode "The Accurate Conception" (Season Five, Episode 3), when the girls shared stories of how their children were conceived, Sophia Petrillo joyfully recalls how she and her husband Salvador attempted conception of Dorothy behind the sausage and pepper stand due to the excitement of the San Gennaro's festivities, much to Dorothy's dismay. Also on The Golden Girls, in the episode called "The Competition" (Season 1, Episode 7), Sophia wants to return to Sicily for the San Gennaro Festival with a long-lost love, Augustine Bagatelli.
- On Laverne & Shirley, the two-part season 4 opener has the characters travelling to New York to attend the festival.
- In the Marvel: Avengers Alliance game, magic has brought the statue of San Gennaro to life, and a hero can be sent to fight it.
- On Family Guy: season 15 episode 2, a parody of The Godfather II's scene mentioned above.
- On Billions (TV series) Season 4 episode 2, Charles Rhodes is endorsed by the police commissioner, Richie Sansome making it known he is running for Attorney General of New York.

== Gallery ==
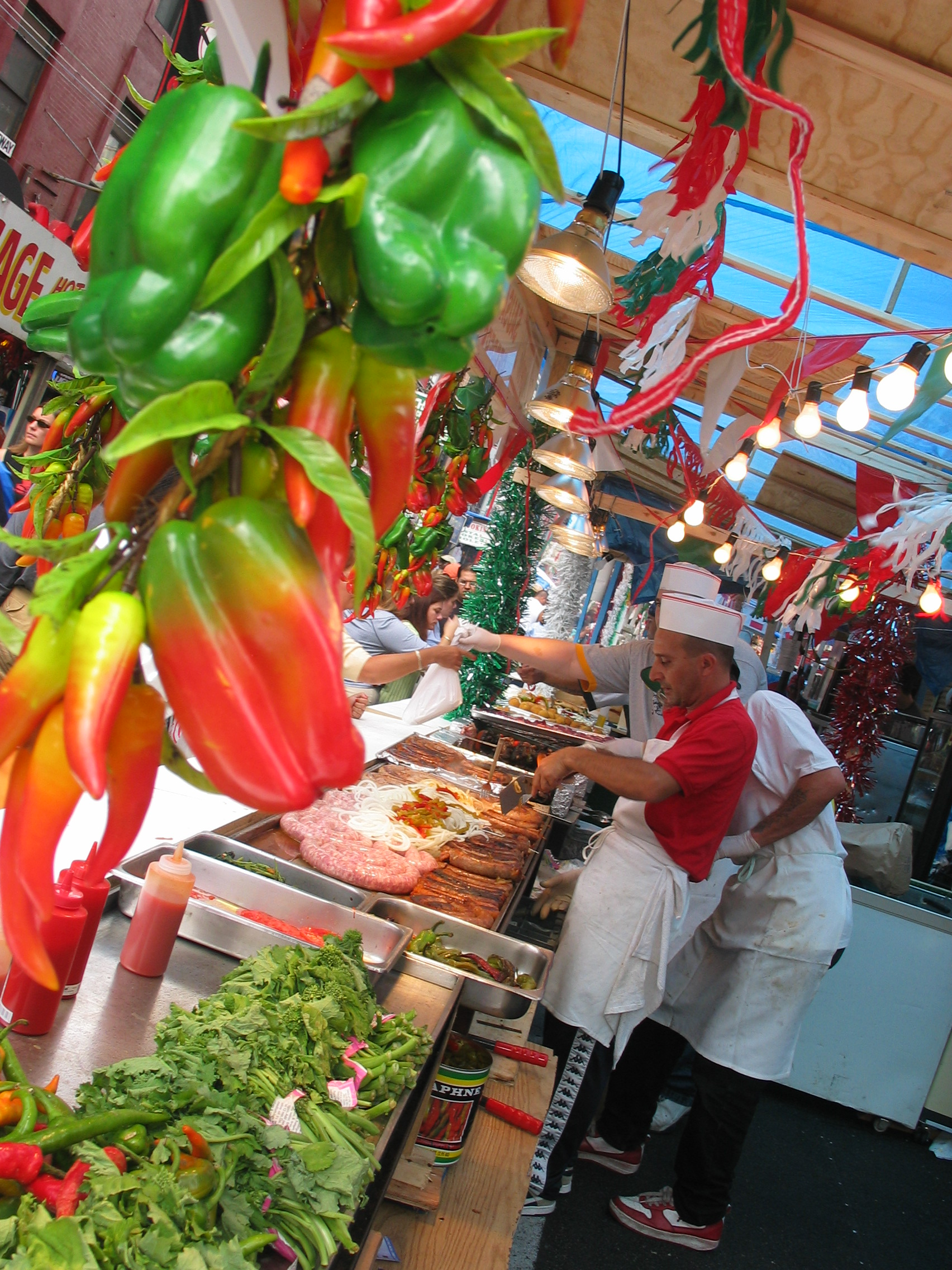
Street vendors selling sausages at the feast

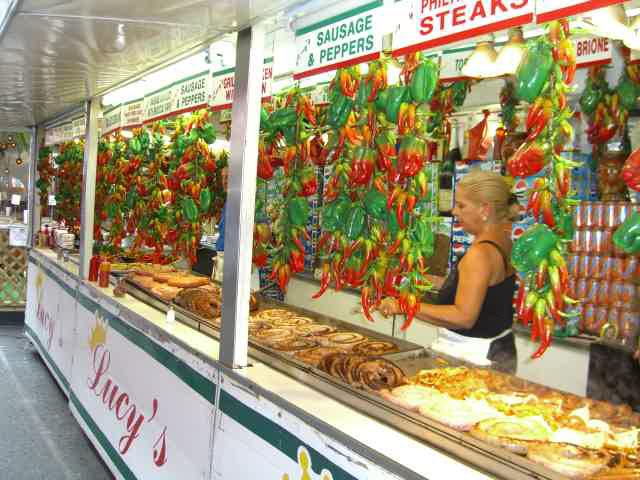
Vendors selling cheesesteak sandwiches, sausages and other foods line the streets

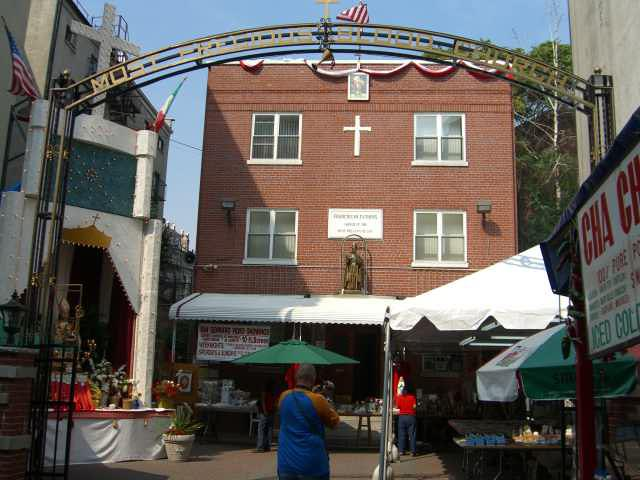
The Offices and Rectory of the Most Precious Blood Church, during the San Gennaro Festival, featuring a shrine to San Gennaro on the left

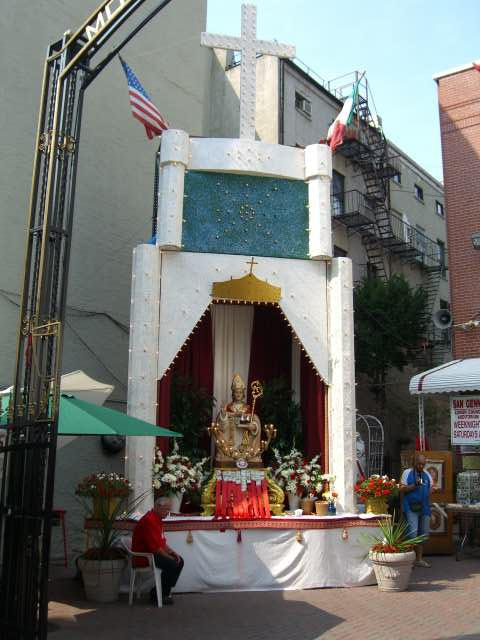
A San Gennaro shrine in the courtyard of the Most Precious Blood Church

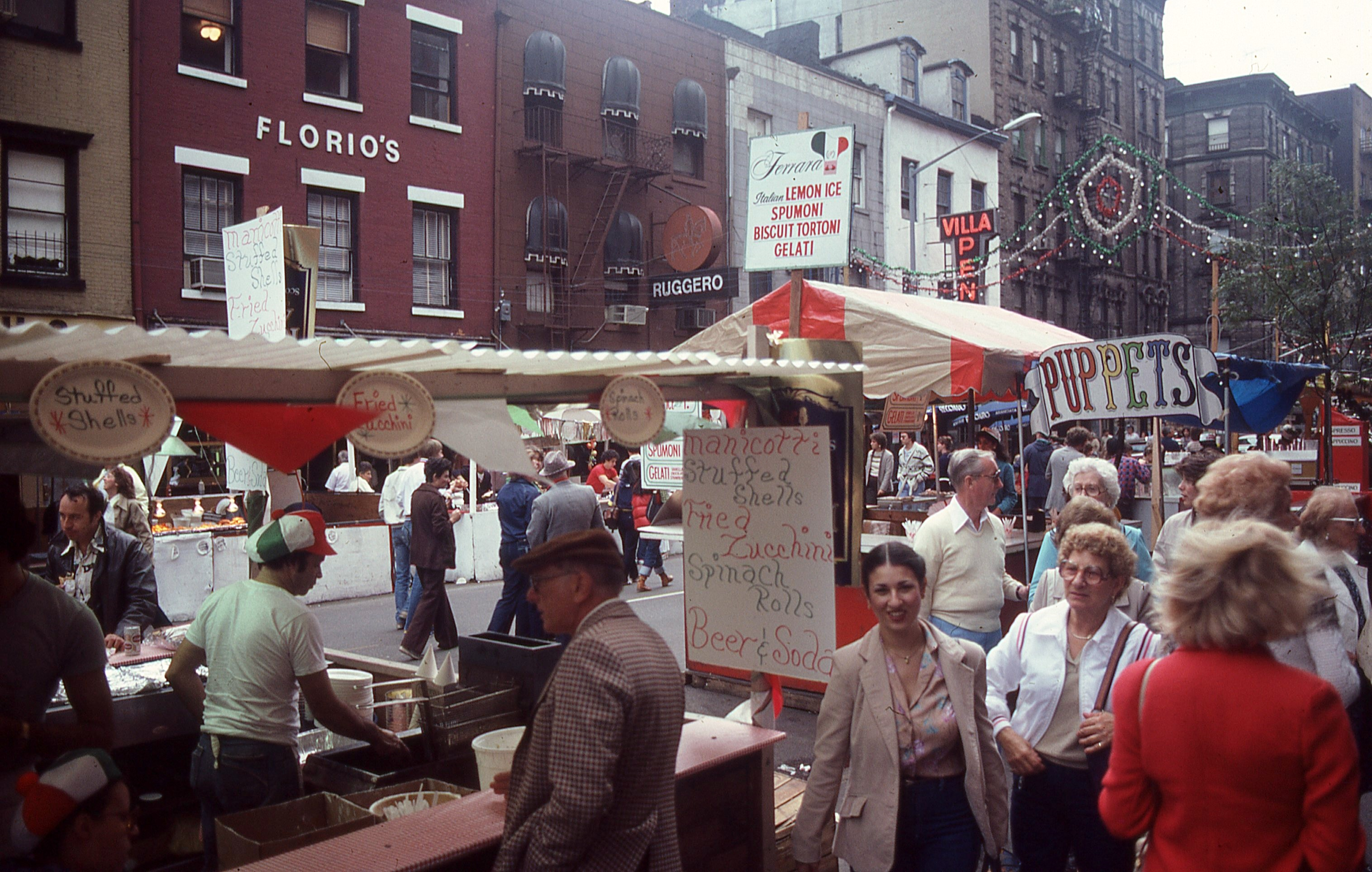
The Feast of San Gennaro along Grand Street in 1981

== See also ==
- Cathedral of Saint Januarius – Naples Cathedral
- Church of the Most Precious Blood (Manhattan) – National Shrine Church of San Gennaro in New York
- Culture of New York City
- Italians in New York City
- Patronal festival

== Notes and references ==
=== Bibliography ===
- Lanzoni, Francesco (1927). Le diocesi d'Italia dalle origini al principio del secolo VII (an. 604) (in Italian). Faenza: F. Lega. pp. 254–263.
