= Pavin =

Pavin may refer to:

- Pavin (surname)
- Pavane, also spelled "pavin", a slow processional dance
- Pavin of Le Mans (Paduinus), French monk, see the chronological list of saints and blesseds in the 8th century
- Pavin Chachavalpongpun
- Pavin Smith, an American baseball player
