= Brian McKenna (restaurateur) =

British-born chef and restaurateur (born 1977)

Brian McKenna (born May 25, 1977) is a British-born chef and restaurateur who is best known for becoming head chef at the (now closed) Michelin-starred Le Poussin at Parkhill restaurant in Hampshire, southern England at the age of 21. McKenna is currently based in Beijing, China where he has opened a series of restaurants and catering businesses.

== Career ==
McKenna got his culinary start at the age of 14 in the kitchens of ‘Ninety Park Lane’, a three-Michelin-starred restaurant inside Grosvenor House Hotel in Mayfair, London.

In 2008, McKenna launched ROOMbmk, a hospitality group that managed and operated up to thirty-two restaurants in Beijing, including three at the Ullens Center for Contemporary Art (UCCA), a 8,000-square-metre (86,000 sq ft) space in Beijing’s art district – one of the biggest art galleries in Asia.

During the 2008 Beijing Olympics, McKenna’s hospitality group, ROOMbmk, cooked for wine-critic Robert Parker at an event on the Great Wall of China.

In June 2012, Brian McKenna Ltd, took over the Courtyard restaurant on the edge of the ancient Forbidden City moat in Beijing - Brian McKenna @The Courtyard officially opens in February 2013.

In May 2015, Brian McKenna announced that he would close his namesake restaurant on 13 June after three years and cited, “demanding consulting projects, a new gastropub opening in August and an expanding catering company,” as reasons for his departure.

In June 2015, McKenna announced plans to open two new signature restaurants on his LinkedIn page. They include Molly Malone’s Gastropub and BMK Kitchen set to open in Autumn 2015 and early 2016 in central Beijing.

== Awards ==
In 2009, McKenna received the AAA (American Automobile Association) Five Star Diamond Award.

== See also ==
- List of restaurateurs
