= List of botanical gardens and arboretums in South Dakota =

This list of botanical gardens and arboretums in South Dakota is intended to include all significant botanical gardens and arboretums in the U.S. state of South Dakota

Name	Image	Affiliation	City
Kuhnert Arboretum			Aberdeen
McCrory Gardens and South Dakota Arboretum		South Dakota State University	Brookings
Reptile Gardens			Rapid City
Mary Jo Wegner Arboretum			Sioux Falls

== See also ==
- List of botanical gardens and arboretums in the United States
