= Church of the Most Precious Blood (Manhattan) =

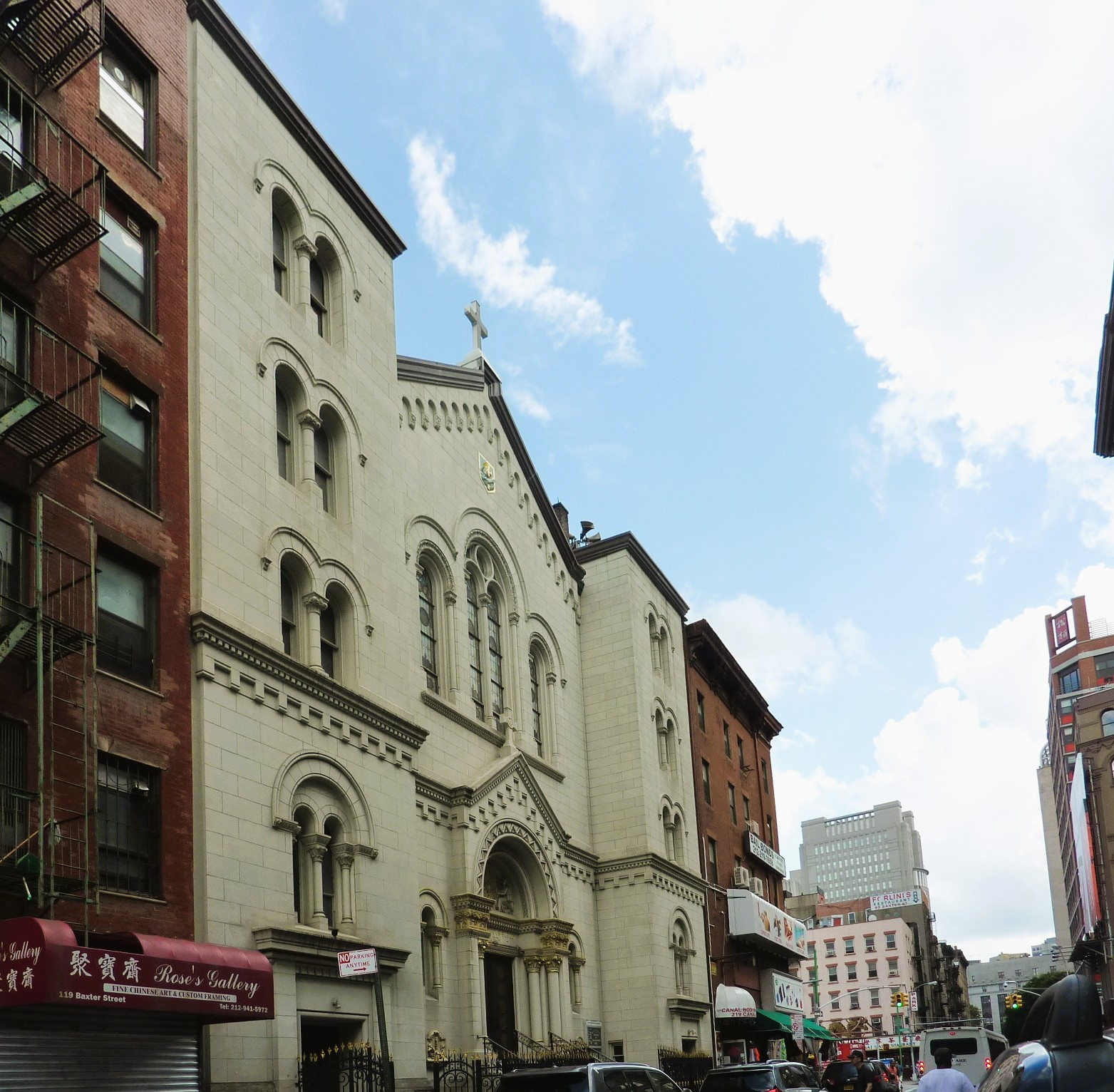
- View along Baxter Street (2013)
- Church of the Most Precious Blood
- 40.717778°N 73.998902°W
- Location: 113 Baxter Street, Manhattan, New York City
- Country: United States
- Denomination: Roman Catholic
- Website: oldcathedral.org/shrine-church-of-the-most-precious-blood

History
- Status: Church

Architecture
- Functional status: Active

Administration
- Archdiocese: Archdiocese of New York
- Parish: St. Patrick's Old Cathedral

The Church of the Most Precious Blood is a Catholic parish in New York City. The parish is under the authority of the Archdiocese of New York, and is the National Shrine Church of San Gennaro. Located at 113 Baxter Street with an additional entrance on Mulberry Street, the Church of the Most Precious Blood is part of Manhattan's Little Italy neighborhood. The Most Precious Blood parished merged with Old St. Patrick's Cathedral parish, and the two churches share priests and administrative staff.

== History ==
The parish of the Most Precious Blood was established in 1888 as a National Parish to serve the rapidly growing number of Italian immigrants in Lower Manhattan. Building of the church was begun by the Scalabrini Fathers around 1891. The Scalabrini Order built the foundation but ran out of funding. The Franciscans then took over the parish and completed the church building in 1904.

=== San Gennaro Festival ===
During the Feast of San Gennaro, which is held yearly in September, a celebratory Mass is held at the church on the September 19th the feast day of San Gennaro. After the Mass, a statue of San Gennaro is taken from its home within the church on a procession through the streets of Little Italy.

Due to manpower shortages, in March 2014, the Franciscans withdrew from Most Precious Blood and it came under diocesan administration. In 2015, the church became part of the parish of St. Patrick's Old Cathedral. Mass is celebrated at Most Precious Blood on Wednesdays and Sundays. In 2018, the parish rectory on Mulberry Street was listed for sale.

During the Extraordinary Jubilee of Mercy, from December 8, 2015, the Feast of the Immaculate Conception, to November 20, 2016, the Feast of Christ the King, was one of the sites of the Holy doors.

== Architecture ==
The church was designed by William Schickel & Company, who provided an Italian Franciscan style structure. The marble main and side altars are by Borgia Marble Works of New York. The interior is decorated in Neapolitan Baroque style. Donatus Buongiorno created thirty oil painting murals for the walls and ceiling. The building was renovated in 1995 by the Gargiulo Brothers Construction Company of Mount Vernon, to repair damage suffered from water leakage and general disrepair. The Church was re-consecrated by Archbishop John Cardinal O'Connor on February 7, 1997.
