= Askar Baitassov =

Kazakhstani restaurateur

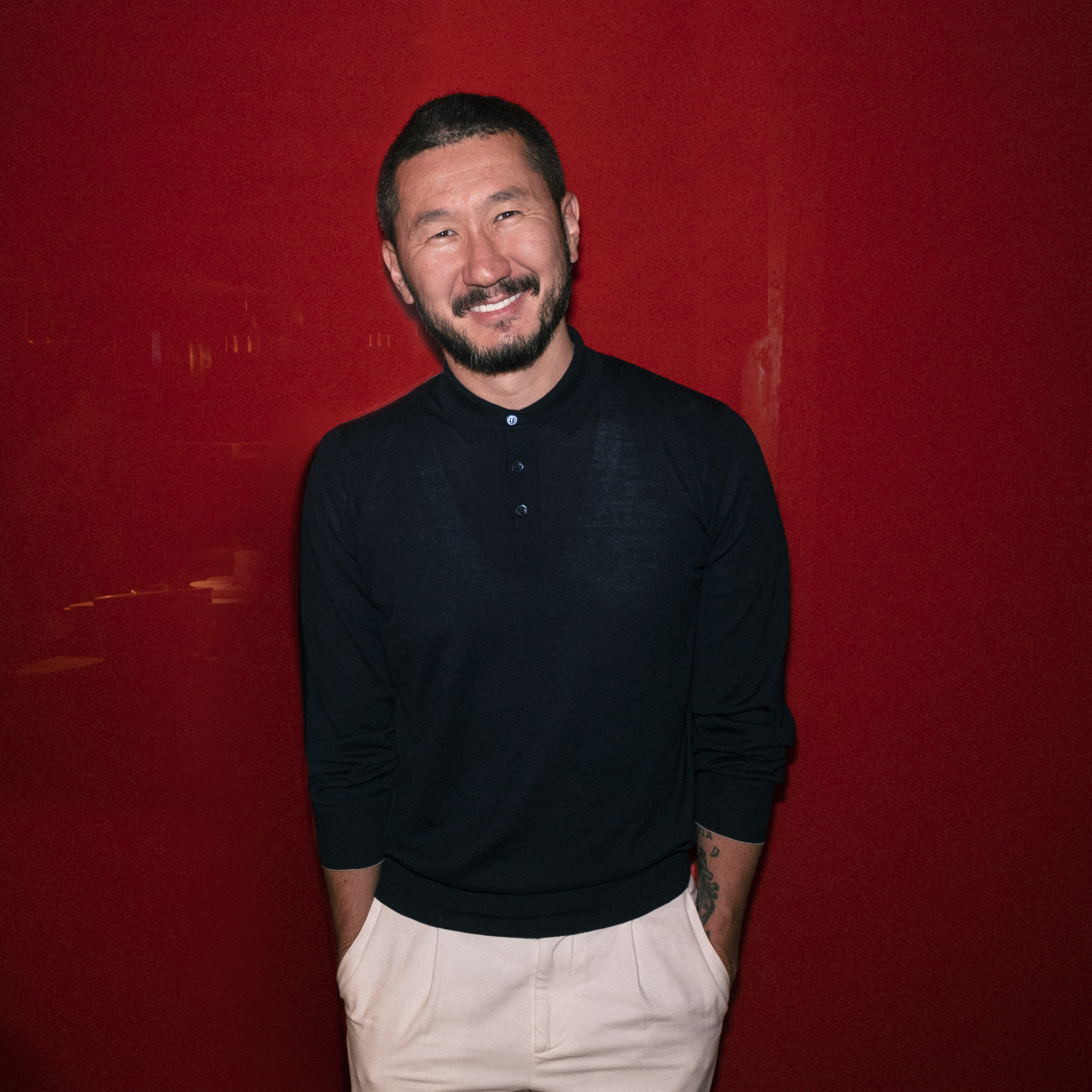
- Born: Askar Bulatovich Baitassov; 25 September 1984 (age 41); Village Mezhdurechenskoye, Almaty region, Kazakhstan
- Occupations: Founder and CEO of abr company

Askar Bolatuly Baitassov (Qazaq: Асқар Болатұлы Байтасов; Russian: Аскар Булатович Байтасов; born September 25, 1984, Mezhdurechenskoye, Almaty region) is a Kazakhstani businessman, founder of abr company, and owner of 50 restaurants in Kazakhstan.

== Early life ==
Baitassov was born on September 25, 1984, in Mezhdurechenskoye, Almaty region to parents Baitassova Aiman Mukhamedzhanovna and Baitassov Bulat Bakhtygereievich.

In 2002, Askar graduated from Kazakh-Turkish Lyceum and in 2007, he graduated from the State University of Management Moscow, Russian-Dutch Department of Marketing. He spent 3 years studying in Moscow and 2 years at Saxion University of Applied Sciences in Enschede, Netherlands.

== Career ==
In 2007, he started managing the family restaurant business in Almaty.

In 2012, founded abr restaurant company. Baitassov has upscaled the family business into a holding that became the leader of the restaurant industry in Almaty.

In 2013, Ernst & Young named Askar Baitassov Entrepreneur of the Year in Kazakhstan.

In 2016, Askar Baitassov graduated from the General Management Program at Harvard Business School.

In 2020, he was included in the Almaty City Council.

In 2025, Forbes Kazakhstan named Askar Baitassov Entrepreneur of the Year.

In 2025, Askar Baitassov was included in the Forbes Kazakhstan list of the 75 richest businessmen in Kazakhstan, with an estimated net worth of $110,000,000.

=== abr company ===
Over 15 years, abr grew to 50 restaurants united under 18 concepts (mono and chain): Del Papa, Афиша, Cafeteria, Огонёк, AUYL, Aroma, Дареджани, Julius, Luckee Yu, Бродвей Бургер, COCO, RAW, SPIROS, Blanca, TÖR, ŞYÑ 32, JINAU, Alma.

In 2024 two abr restaurants — TÖR and AUYL — were included in 52 Places to Go rating by The New York Times. Also in 2024 Forbes published a list of The 16 Most Beautiful Restaurants In The World, According To Prix Versailles – a yearly architectural prize by UNESCO, in which AUYL restaurant was included.

In 2020 the company entered foodtech, releasing abr+ app, and formed a development team by 2021, creating a full scale bonus experience for the offline. In 2023, the abr tech team created the BEAST system for restaurant management.
