= Godfather's Pizza =

American restaurant chain

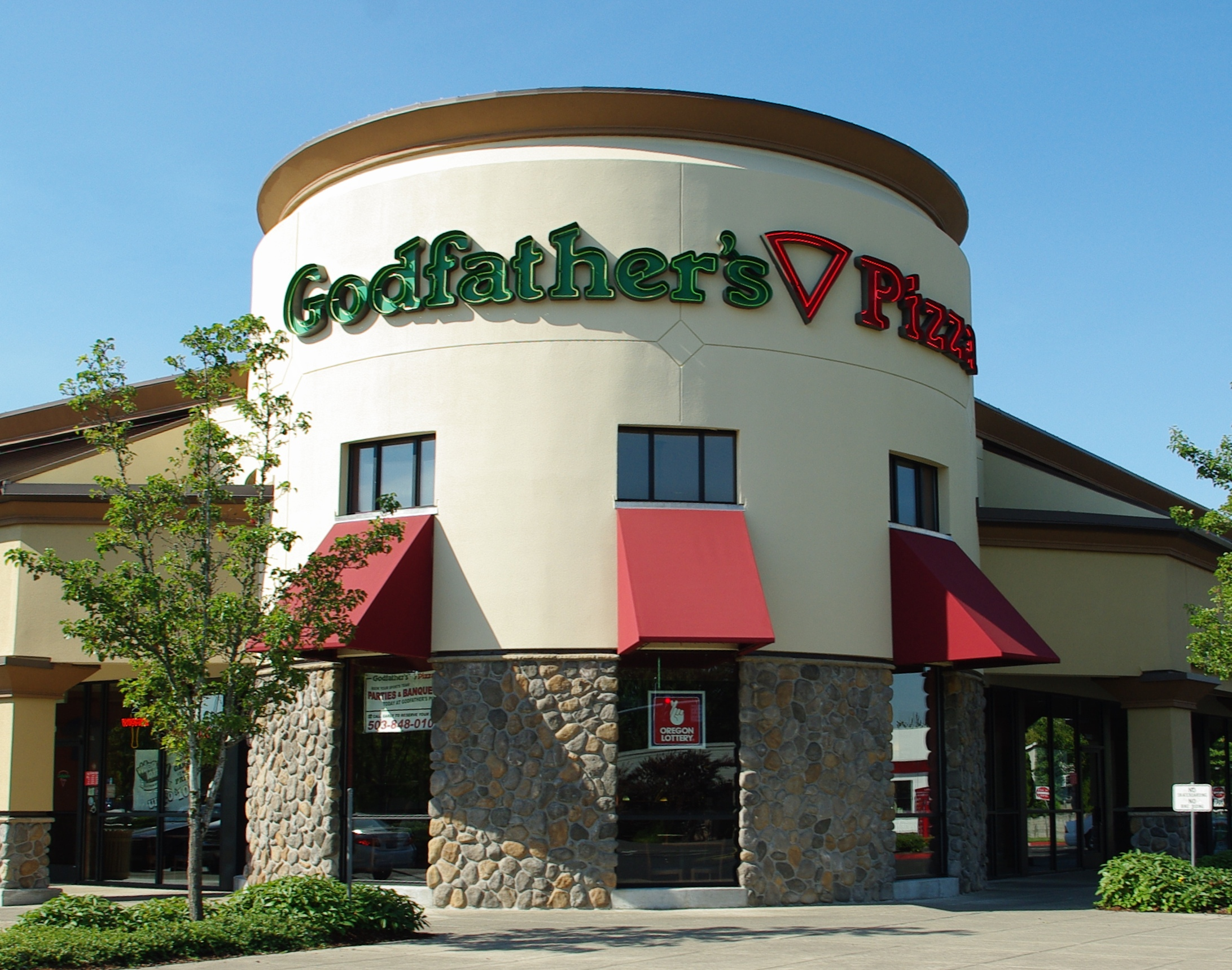
- A location in Hillsboro, Oregon
- Company type: Private
- Industry: Fast Food
- Founded: 1973; 53 years ago
- Founder: William Theisen
- Headquarters: 2808 North 108th Street; Omaha, Nebraska 68164
- Number of locations: 583 (2024)
- Key people: Ronald B. Gartlan (CEO); Herman Cain (former CEO)
- Products: Pizza
- Revenue: US$980 million (2021)
- Number of employees: 4,500 (2021)
- Website: www.godfathers.com

Godfather's Pizza is an American privately owned restaurant chain headquartered in Omaha, Nebraska, that operates fast casual Italian franchises and pizza express locations.

== History ==
Godfather's Pizza was founded in Omaha, Nebraska, in 1973. Willy Theisen bought out the pizza parlor and the name in 1974 from Gregg Johnson (who later started the Minsky's Pizza restaurants), and sold his first franchise. The chain grew rapidly and was named the fastest growing franchise by the National Restaurant Association in 1977, 1978 and 1979. At the peak of its growth, Godfather's Pizza had close to 1,000 locations nationwide. Theisen sold the company to Pillsbury in 1985 and stepped down from actively managing the company. The company relocated headquarters to Southern California in 1985 before returning to Omaha within a year. In 1986, Pillsbury named Herman Cain CEO and president of the brand. Cain and Ronald B. Gartlan, the company's executive vice president, led a group to purchase the Godfather's brand from Pillsbury, which they did by the beginning of 1990 in a leveraged buyout for what was reported to be $100 million. It was reported to be the fifth largest pizza chain in the United States at the time, down from third place in 1985. About this time, many Godfather's locations in the St. Louis area were bought out by Pantera's Pizza. Under Cain's leadership, Godfather's closed approximately 200 restaurants and eliminated several thousand jobs, and by doing so returned to profitability. Cain stepped down from his position as CEO and president in 1996 and Gartlan became CEO. Cain stayed on as chairman until 2002. In 2009 Gartlan bought out Cain.

=== Locations ===
Godfather's operates its standalone stores mostly in its traditional stronghold area of the Midwestern United States, particularly Nebraska, Iowa, Minnesota, and South Dakota. According to the company's official website in August 2016, the chain had 453 locations in the U.S. Godfather's Pizza also operates express locations inside some Speedway locations, as well as most Minit Mart locations in Kentucky and northern Tennessee, as of 2007. The express program began in 1990 and its success led to the start of a To Go program in 2018, by which licensed retailers sell 7-inch reheated pre-topped frozen pizzas. In 2024, Alta Convenience began selling to-go Godfather's Pizza at 21 of its convenience stores across several states including Colorado, Wyoming and Kansas. As of February 2024, Godfather's had 583 franchised and over 1,600 licensed locations.

== Spokesman ==
Godfather's Pizza is known for its commercials featuring "The Godfather", whose likeness is a parody of Don Fanucci, from the 1974 film The Godfather Part II, though some sources compare the role to that of Don Vito Corleone of 1972's The Godfather. "The Godfather" has been played by two Omaha actors, the first being J. William Koll, who typically wore a white fedora hat, a pinstripe suit, and a flower on his jacket. Dale O'Brien, a professional actor since 1975, has been the Godfather's Pizza spokesman since about 2000, often using the phrase "do it!" and slogan "a pizza you can't refuse".

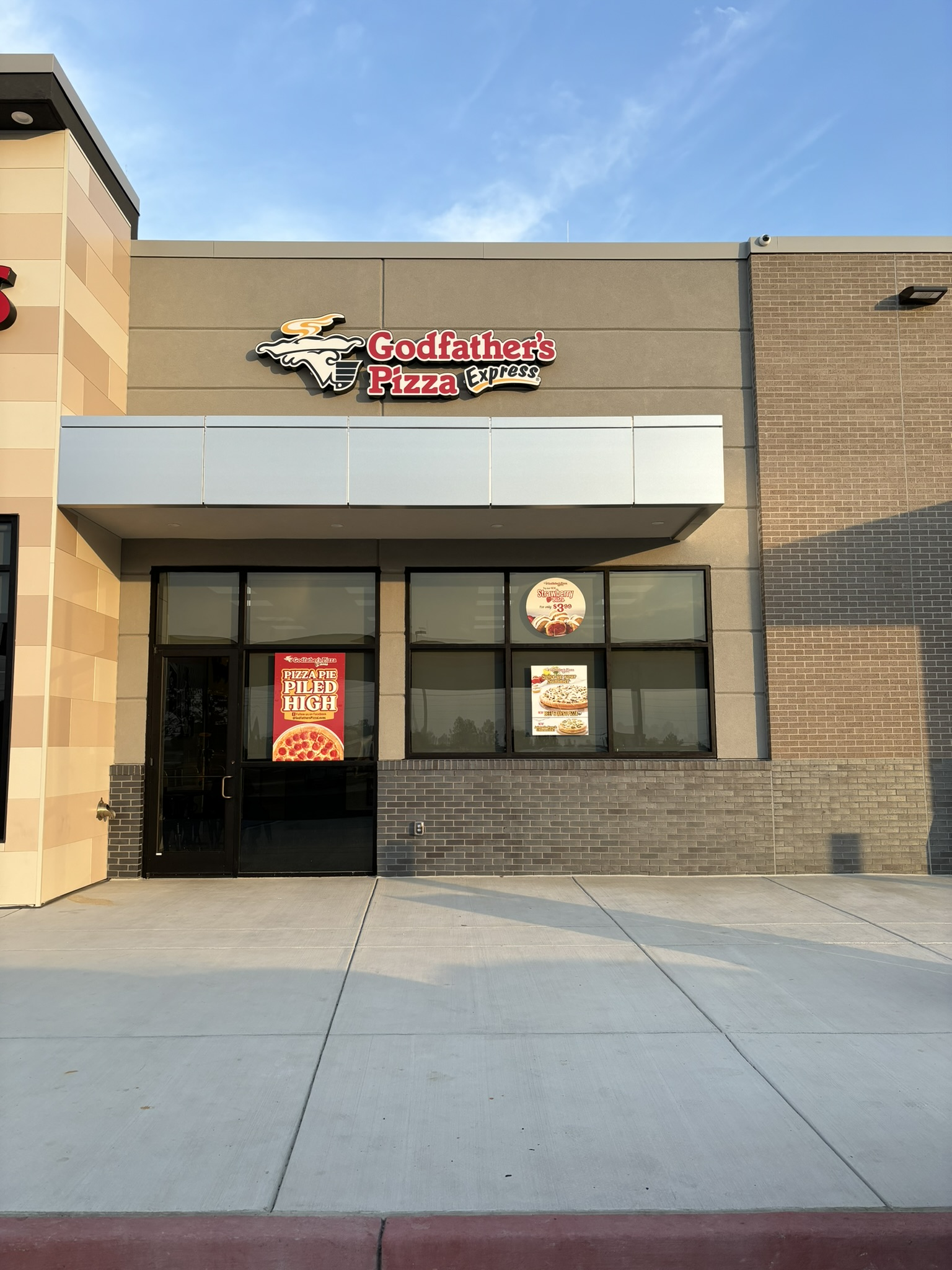
Godfather's Pizza Express in Lowndes County, Georgia

== See also ==
- List of buffet restaurants
- List of pizza chains of the United States
