= Pavin (surname) =

Pavin is a surname. Notable people with the surname include:

- Corey Pavin (born 1959), American golfer
- Lucia Pavin (born 1947), Italian chef
- Mario Pavin (born 1958), Italian rugby union player and coach
- Michela Pavin (born 1994), Italian cyclist

== See also ==
- Lavin (surname)
