= Phenix Kühnert =

Phenix Kühnert is a German author, actor, and trans activist.

== Life ==
Kühnert was born and raised in Lübeck. After her Abitur, she moved to Berlin, aged 18. There she initially worked in a PR agency. As a child, she had explained to her parents that she felt like a girl. She first came out as a gay man. In 2018 Kühnert realised that her birth name did not suit her, then began therapeutic counselling and hormone treatment. According to her, the name Phenix was given to her by a döner seller at Kottbusser Tor.

She ran the podcast Freitagabend ("Friday evening") from 2018 to 2021. In 2021, she launched a podcast, Die falschen Fragen ("The Wrong Questions"), with Focus columnist Jan Fleischhauer. She withdrew from the project after an episode, according to Fleischhauer, due to negative reactions from her social media community.

Other than her social media presence on platforms such as Instagram, Kühnert acts in various supporting roles on German-language television. In 2023, she was one of the first trans women to be part of Tatort München, after she appeared in the episode "Königinnen" ("Queens") as the Aichach asparagus queen (Spargelkönigin) Luise. As of June 2026, she has acted in the ZDF crime series Katharina Tempel as Moira Brenner, Crystal Wall as Magdalena, and the Der Schatten episode "Wunderland". In 2023, Kühnert was honoured by Glamour Germany as a "Gamechanger" as part of the "Woman of the Year" awards.

Kühnert publicly advocates for trans rights. In reports, podcasts, and interviews, she deals with topics related to gender diversity. She also gives presentations at universities and companies. In 2020, Zeit Campus included her in their "30 under 30" list of young people who are actively working to improve the world. Focus magazine selected Kühnert as one of the "100 Women of the Year" for her activism as a trans woman.

In 2022, her book Eine Frau ist eine Frau ist eine Frau ("A Woman is a Woman is a Woman") was published by Haymon Verlag.
