= Arthur Cores =

American businessman

Arthur Richard Cores (August 11, 1957 – December 16, 2009) was an American businessman and entrepreneur who was a co-founder of Boston Market.

In 1985, while a student at Northeastern University in Boston, the 27-year-old Cores partnered with fellow student Steven Kolow to open the Boston Chicken restaurant in Newton, Massachusetts, which quickly became popular with locals who liked the home-cooked rotisserie chicken. Businessman George Naddaff bought the rights to the restaurant and expanded it into a chain, which later became Boston Market. Cores continued to work in the original store, eventually selling his shares in the corporation and retiring in 1994.

In 2003, Cores was diagnosed with advanced liver cancer and given months to live. Through an experimental procedure, the cancer was held in check for several years.

Cores died from complications of esophageal cancer at his home in Miami, Florida on December 16, 2009, at the age of 52.
