= Stanley Nicholas Garland =

New Zealand restaurateur and consul

Stanley Nicholas Garland (25 January 1892 – 15 November 1964) was a New Zealand restaurateur and consul. He was born in Kíthira, Greece on 25 January 1892.
