= Mezhdurechenskoe =

Mezhdurechenskoe Междуреченское
- Village
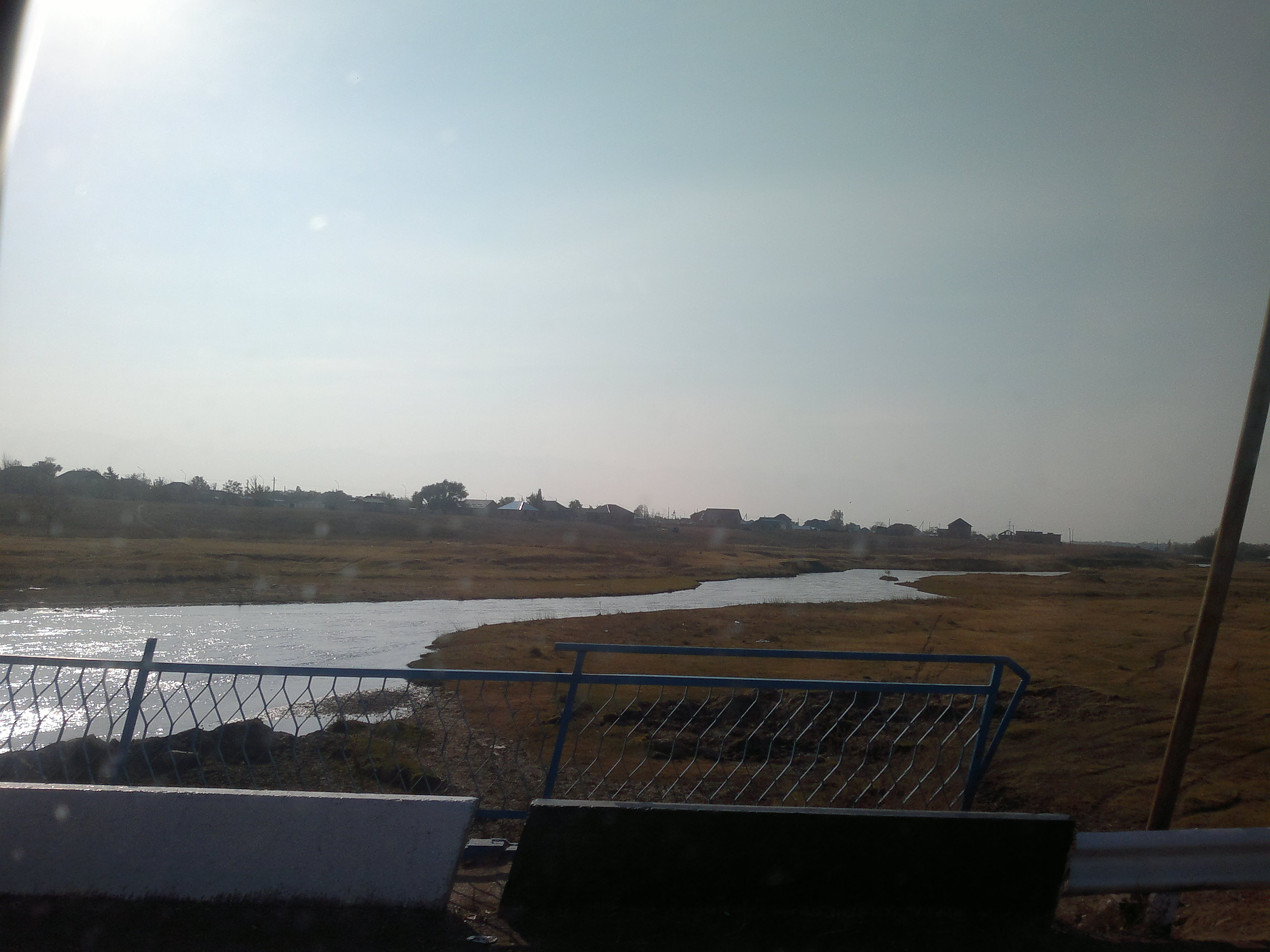
- Mezhdurechenskoe

- Location in Kazakhstan
- Coordinates: 43°27′10″N 76°43′22″E
- Country: Kazakhstan
- Region: Almaty Region
- District: Ile District
- Time zone: UTC+6 (Omsk Time)

Mezhdurechenskoe or Mezhdurechenskoye (Kazakh: Междуреченское, Mejdurechenskoe) is a village in Ile District of Almaty Region in south-eastern Kazakhstan.
