= Tadas Karosas =

Lithuanian businessman, founder and owner of Čilija restaurant chain

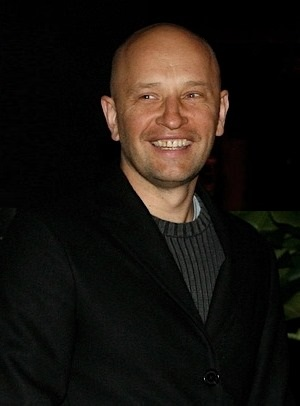
Tadas Karosas

Tadas Karosas (born 1963 in Vilnius) is a serial entrepreneur, owner of “LTk Capital”, founder of dozens of businesses in various fields. The majority of his companies were successfully developed to take up leading positions in their respective markets and sold profitably. Currently, Tadas Karosas is mostly focusing on developing two of his leading businesses – restaurant chain “Čili Holdings” and online retail store chain pigu.lt. Over the last years, he has also taken up the roles of business angel, active investor, and founded and developed several e-commerce startups, and is currently awaiting the results of investments made.

== Education and early life ==
Tadas Karosas graduated from Vilnius University and acquired a degree of law. He started working at Public Prosecutor's Office in 1986 and stayed there until 1992.

== Current business development ==
“LTk Capital”, founded by Tadas Karosas, is currently developing and selling the enterprises described below.

In 2008, an investment was made into pigu.lt, which became a leading online retail store in Lithuania. In 2011, the oldest online store in Latvia – “220.lv” – has been acquired, followed by “kaup24.ee” in Estonia. “Pigu.lt” has been proliferating and is often called “Amazon of the Baltics”.

“LTk Capital”, founded by Tadas Karosas, owns restaurant chain “Čili Holdings“. Since its founding, the holding has opened over 100 of restaurants – a few in Ukraine, Poland, and Romania, yet the main focus has remained on operations in the Baltics. Since 2014, a division has been opened in Madrid, Spain. Currently, the rapid development of “Čili holdings” has been slowed down, yet it remains the biggest restaurant chain in Lithuania with a continually growing turnover – it is estimated to increase by 25% in 2019 compared to 2018.

== Developed and sold businesses ==
In 2009, companies run by Tadas Karosas began implementing e-commerce platform “Amazingsales.com” in Belgium, Holland, and Germany. The enterprise was sold in 2012.

In 2004, Tadas Karosas founded a cosmetics and perfumery import and wholesale company “Kruzas Nordic Cosmetics Distribution”. A year later, he opened a SPA and massage center chain “East Island”, which was subsequently sold successfully. “Kruzas Nordic Cosmetics Distribution” expanded to Latvia and Estonia in 2007 and 2009 and sold to a Finland-based “Berner Ltd”.

In 2007, the entrepreneur founded an entertainment website and web TV “ctv.lt”, which was sold in 2011.

In 2001, Tadas Karosas founded “Gelvoros saugos konsultacijos” – debt collection and management company, providing information about companies' risk level. In 2008, the enterprise was sold to a Swedish company.

In 2000, he founded, developed, and sold “Gelvora” – a physical security service company, which became the basis for the operations of “G4S” in Lithuania.

From 1992 to 2000, Tadas Karosas founded and directly developed “Mineraliniai vandenys, UAB”. The business is expanding rapidly and takes up the leading position in the market.

From 1991, Tadas Karosas developed and, in 2004, successfully sold cosmetics and perfumery chain “SARMA”, which became the basis for the operations of “Douglas” chain store in Lithuania.
