= William Theisen =

American businessman

William "Willy" Theisen is a restaurant entrepreneur from Omaha, Nebraska, born in Chicago and raised in Clinton, Iowa. He was the founder and former owner of Godfather's Pizza, a popular pizzeria chain that has locations in over 40 states. Theisen got the idea to start a pizza chain when he was running his own bar called "Wild Willys." He noticed many of his customers carried pizza, from a pizza restaurant next door, into his bar to eat it. Theisen decided to remove the wall separating the two businesses. The first Godfathers opened in 1973. Many locations opened throughout the country and Theisen looked to have a hit on his hands. He sold his interest and ownership in the company in the mid-1980s to Pillsbury and stepped down from operating the company. Pillsbury has long since sold the restaurant chain.

Theisen in 1983 constructed a 20,125 square feet (1,869.7 m^{2}) mansion, at the time the largest mansion in Omaha; he sold the mansion in 1995 to Terry Watanabe, former owner of Oriental Trading Company. The mansion was placed back on the market with an asking price of approximately $5 million. The Omaha World-Herald reported that the mansion has been sold and will be removed, with the property to be used for 3-4 smaller houses.

In 2009 he opened Pitch Pizzeria in Omaha, his first new pizza restaurant since he sold his interest in Godfather's in the mid-1980s. Unlike Godfather's, Pitch is a coal-fired, thin-crust pizzeria. In 2020, Theisen obtained a Godfather's franchise.
