= Crystal Wall =

German romance-drama programme

- Genre: Romance, Drama, Crime
- Directed by: Tarek Roehlinger; Greta Benkelmann
- Starring: Anna Bardavelidze: Louna Loris; Gustav Schmidt: Nicolas Dardenne
- Composer: Sebastian Fillenberg
- Countries of origin: Germany; Austria
- No. of seasons: 1
- No. of episodes: 24

Production
- Running time: 25 minutes
- Production companies: Producers at Work; Wega Film

Original release
- Network: ZDF
- Release: 10 April 2025

Crystal Wall is a German-Austrian TV programme that was made for ZDF in 2024 by the production companies Producers at Work and Wega Film. The first season has 24 episodes, which are broadcast online on a weekly basis. The first episode aired on 10 April 2025 on ZDF's streaming service.

== Plot ==
The MMA fighter Louna Loris saves the millionaire-to-be Nicolas Dardenne from a life-or-death situation. In return, she is appointed as his personal bodyguard. However, Louna is pursuing another goal; she wants to find out about her father's mysterious death. He worked for the powerful Dardenne company and died under strange circumstances. While she works at Nicolas' side, the pair become closer, which is a cause of great conflict for Louna, because of her mistrust for the influential family.

The so-called 'crystal wall' is symbolic of the world that separates Louna and Nicolas, but with time these differences begin to crumble.

== Production ==
Based on the literary genre of new adult fiction, the romance-drama series was created for a younger target audience. The screenplay was written by Lead Writer and Creative Producer Brigit Waiwald together with a writers' room that included Florian Vey, Silva Raddatz, Aglef Püschel, Katja Grübel und Burkhard Wunderlich.

The series was directed by Tarek Roehlinger (episodes 1–12) and Greta Benkelmann (episodes 13–24), and produced by Producers at Work and Wega Film for ZDF. The show consists of one series with 24 episodes. The show features model Barbara Meier in a guest appearance as Valerie.

Filming took place in Berlin and Vienna. The series premiered on 8 April 2025 at the Achtung Berlin film festival, and the first episode aired on 10 April 2025.

== Reception ==
Prisma praised the series, in particular its diverse cast and Anna Bardavelidze's performance as Louna. In contrast, Die Tageszeitung criticises the show's illogical dialogue and outdated aesthetic, as well its failure to look beyond typical tropes of the genre. Kulturnews praises Brigit Waiwald's writing, in particular the characters' depth, as well as the actors' performances. However, it questions the viewers' ability to empathise with Nicolas' suffering due to his wealthy background.

== Episode list ==
=== Series 1 ===
| Episode | Name (English translation) | First released on ZDF-Mediathek | First broadcast on ZDFneo |
|---|---|---|---|
| 1 | Blut auf Gold (blood and gold) | 10 April 2025 | 27 April 2025 |
| 2 | Der Job (the job) | 10 April 2025 | 27 April 2025 |
| 3 | Tag Eins (day one) | 10 April 2025 | 27 April 2025 |
| 4 | Väter (father) | 10 April 2025 | 27 April 2025 |
| 5 | Mütter (mother) | 10 April 2025 | 4 May 2025 |
| 6 | Eifersucht (jealousy) | 10 April 2025 | 4 May 2025 |
| 7 | Zwischen den Stühlen (between the chairs) | 10 April 2025 | 4 May 2025 |
| 8 | Die Fabrik (the factory) | 10 April 2025 | 4 May 2025 |
| 9 | Entscheidungen (decisions) | 10 April 2025 | 11 May 2025 |
| 10 | Party | 10 April 2025 | 11 May 2025 |
| 11 | Begehren (desires) | 17. April 2025 | 11 May 2025 |
| 12 | Verrat (betrayal) | 17 April 2025 | 11 May 2025 |
| 13 | Vertrauen (trust) | 24 April 2025 | 18 May 2025 |
| 14 | Opfer (victim) | 24 April 2025 | 18 May 2025 |
| 15 | Der Sohn (the son) | 1 May 2025 | 18 May 2025 |
| 16 | Schande (shame) | 1 May 2025 | 18 May 2025 |
| 17 | TBC | 8 May 2025 | TBC |
| 18 | TBC | 8 May 2025 | TBC |
| 19 | TBC | 15 May 2025 | TBC |
| 20 | TBC | 15 May 2025 | TBC |
| 21 | TBC | 22 May 2025 | TBC |
| 22 | TBC | 22 May 2025 | TBC |
| 23 | TBC | 29 May 2025 | TBC |
| 24 | TBC | 29 May 2025 | |
