= Boston Market =

Chain of American fast casual restaurants

Boston Market Corporation
- Current logo (April 2018–present)

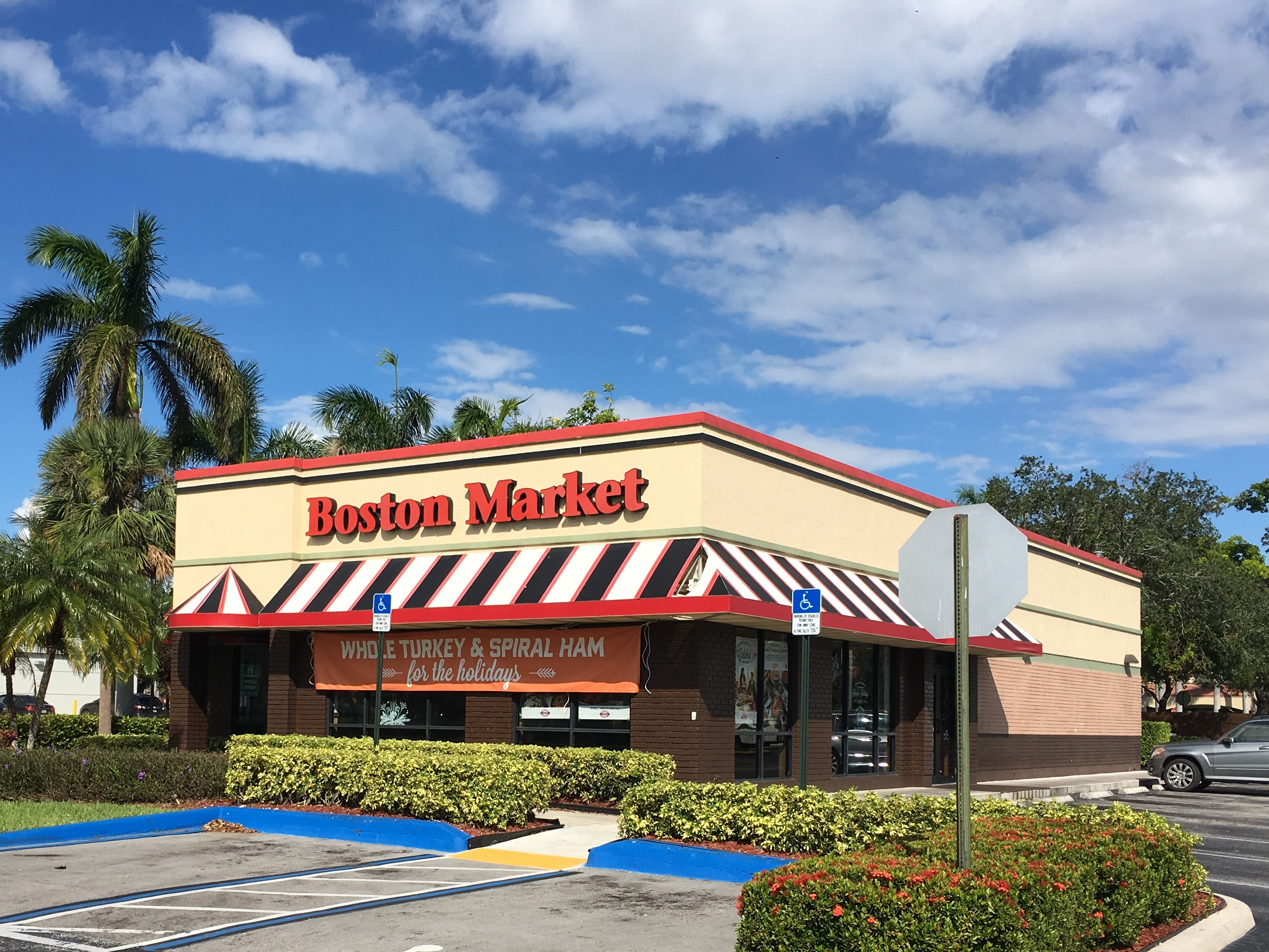
- Boston Market restaurant
- Trade name: Boston Market
- Formerly: Boston Chicken (1985–1995)
- Type: Private
- Industry: Restaurants
- Genre: Fast casual
- Founded: 1985; 41 years ago Newton, Massachusetts, U.S.
- Founders: Steven Kolow; Arthur Cores
- Headquarters: Newtown Township, Pennsylvania, United States
- Number of locations: 6 (September 2026)
- Area served: United States
- Key people: Jay Pandya (owner)
- Products: Rotisserie chicken; chicken dishes; turkey dishes; meatloaf dishes; ribs; sandwiches; pot pies; salads; soups; cornbread; mashed potatoes; mac n' cheese; creamed spinach; steamed vegetables; desserts; soft drinks
- Revenue: US$ 373 million ▲ (2020)
- Owner: Engage Brands LLC
- Website: bostonmarket.com

Boston Market Corporation, known as Boston Chicken until 1995, is an American fast casual restaurant chain headquartered in Newtown Township, Pennsylvania. Since 2020, it has been owned by Engage Brands, LLC, a company of Rohan Group. From 1985 to 1995, Boston Market was known as Boston Chicken, which rapidly expanded to over a thousand locations. By the late 1990s, the chain filed for bankruptcy and closed many stores until a few hundred remained. McDonald's purchased the chain in 2000. It was sold again in 2007, then in 2020. As of November 2020, the chain had approximately 342 company-owned restaurant locations in 28 states and Puerto Rico. In the 2020s the chain encountered legal troubles and went into a rapid decline to end 2024 with only 16 remaining stores. At its peak, Boston Market had its greatest presence in the Northeastern and Midwestern United States, as well as California, Florida, and Texas.

Boston Market helped popularize rotisserie chicken and fast-casual dining, both of which remain popular nationally. While initially specializing in rotisserie chicken, the chain later branched out into other meats, including turkey, meatloaf, and ham. A typical meal paired a protein with sides like potatoes, creamed spinach, or mac & cheese, accompanied by a piece of corn bread. Stores also offered seasonal specials and sandwiches. Frozen meals and side dishes continue to be sold nationally under the Boston Market brand name in food markets.

== History ==
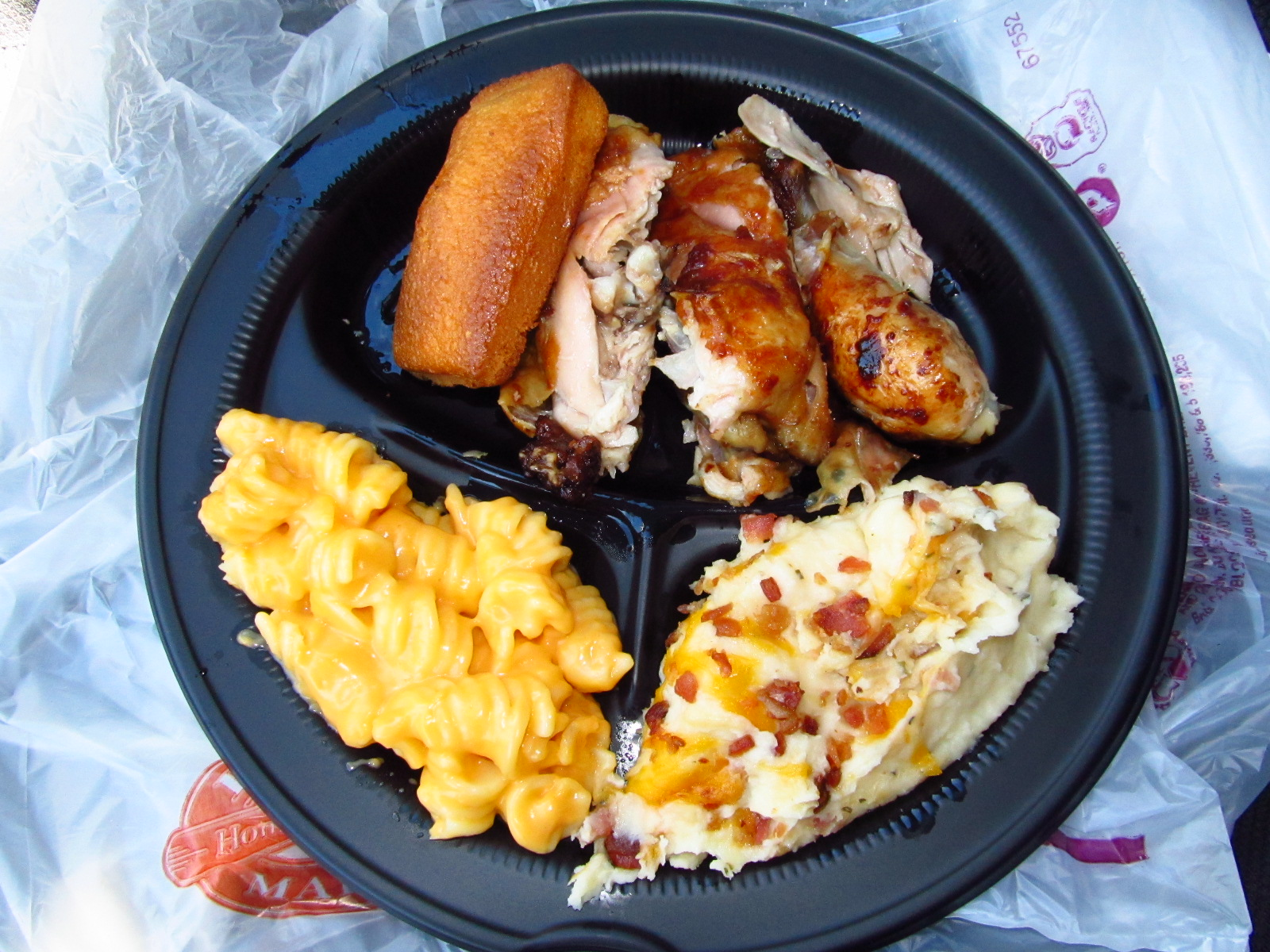
Boston Market meal with Chicken, Cornbread, Mac & Cheese, and Mashed Potatoes

Boston Chicken was founded by Steven Kolow and Arthur Cores in 1985 in Newton, a suburb of Boston. The chain expanded rapidly in the early and mid-1990s.

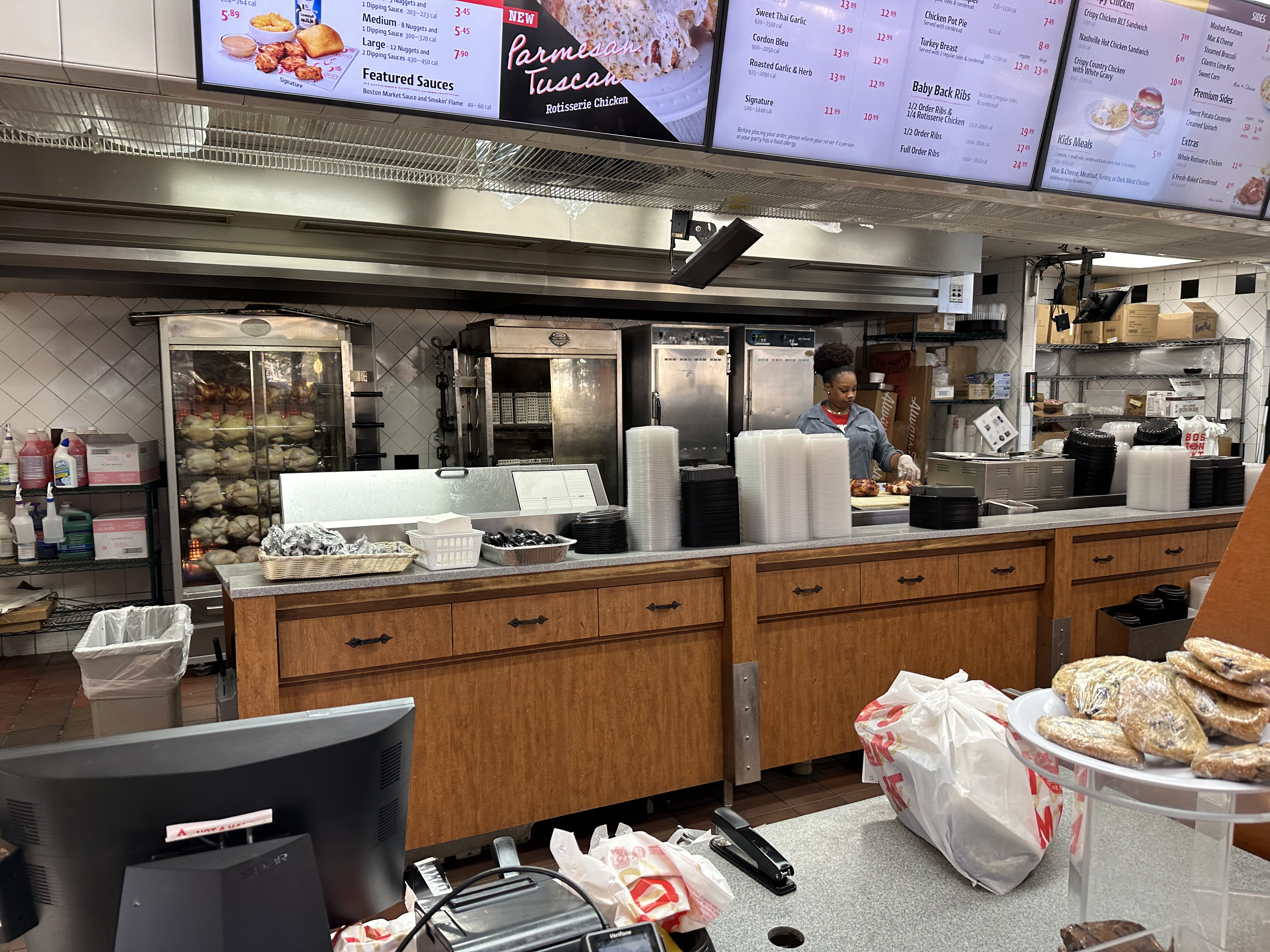
Boston Market interior, on the left was oven with rotating Chickens being cooked, hence the rotisserie

When it was known as Boston Chicken, restaurants specialized in rotisserie chicken and a variety of side dishes, but in February 1995, the chain expanded its menu to include turkey, meatloaf, and ham and changed the name to Boston Market in the fall of 1995 to reflect this. The corporate name remained Boston Chicken, Inc. until 1997, when the new name became popular and the corporate name was changed to Boston Market Corporation.

In 1995, Boston Chicken created the Einstein Bros. Bagels chain of bakery cafés, after acquiring several smaller chains of bagel-centric bakeries.

In 1996, the chain launched "Boston Carver Sandwiches", which featured chicken, turkey, ham, and meatloaf; in 1997, due to the success of the sandwich line, "Extreme Carver" sandwiches, filled with larger portions of meat and cheese, were launched.

The company raised a lot of debt to finance its expansion. The rapid expansion allowed the company to create a steady stream of revenue from one-time development fees and increasing royalties, but also raised interest rates on its development loans. In 1998, the company filed for Chapter 11 bankruptcy.

Since April 1999, a selection of Boston Market-branded items have been available in many supermarkets across the United States.

Boston Market was purchased by McDonald's Corporation in May 2000, primarily for its real estate holdings. McDonald's found the brand serviceable, and continued to operate and expand Boston Market.

In the early 2000s, Boston Market operated two locations in Toronto, Ontario. In early 2002, Boston Market entered the Australian market, opening nine stores in the Sydney metropolitan area by 2004, before converting some stores to McDonald's and quietly exiting the Australian market later that year due to competitive pressures.

In April 2004, Boston Market introduced chilled menu items to be sold in supermarkets. In December 2005, these chilled menu items were available in 700 supermarkets.

In 2005, Boston Market also started limited-time offers, such as Crispy Country Chicken, an oven-baked chicken breast with gravy.

In 2007, McDonald's announced that it was "exploring strategic options" for the subsidiary. On August 6, 2007, McDonald's announced plans to sell the chain to Sun Capital Partners, a transaction that was completed on August 27, 2007.

In 2013, Boston Market opened its first new location in seven years in Florida and in 2015 it added ribs to the menu.

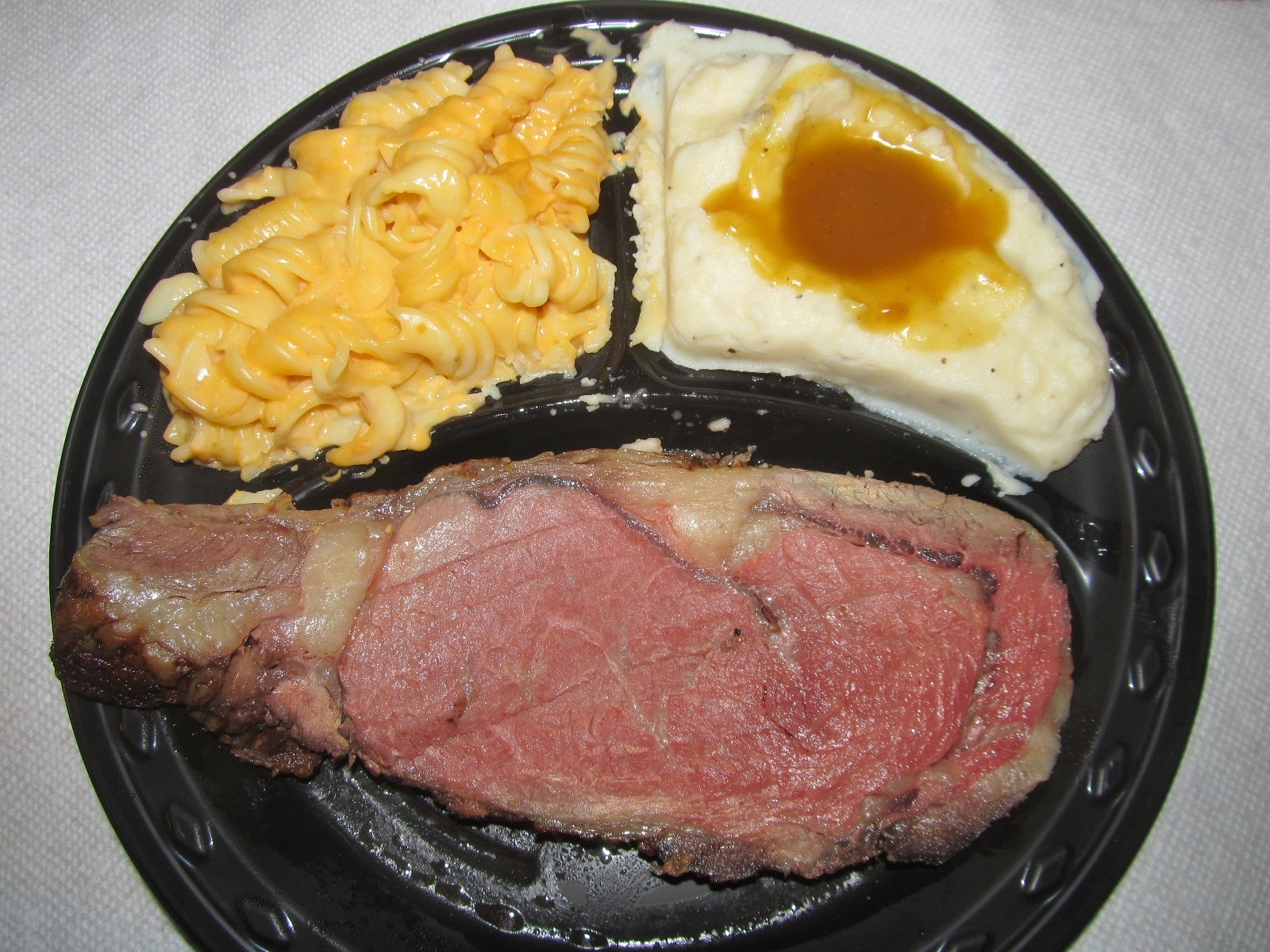
Prime rib was introduced in 2018, shown here with mashed potatoes and gravy, and mac n' cheese. It was only available on certain days.

In April 2018, Boston Market announced that it was expanding its menu to offer rotisserie prime rib nationwide, three days a week. In 2019, the chain closed 45 locations, with one report noting competition with rotisserie chickens sold at regular supermarket chains. In 2020, it introduced baby back ribs paired with Sweet Baby Ray's sauce.

In April 2020, Sun Capital Partners sold Boston Market to Engage Brands, LLC, a company of Rohan Group, owned by Jignesh "Jay" Pandya. This started a difficult period in which the company stopped paying its suppliers, rent, and some employees. This resulted in over 150 lawsuits. In 2023, New Jersey shut down 27 locations when it was determined employees were owed hundreds of thousands of dollars. The chain started with about 300 locations at the start of 2023, but was down to 79 locations later that year, and by early 2024 there were fewer than 30 locations even though the chain opened a new location in India.

As of 2026, there are only six remaining locations, according to the company website.

== Menu ==
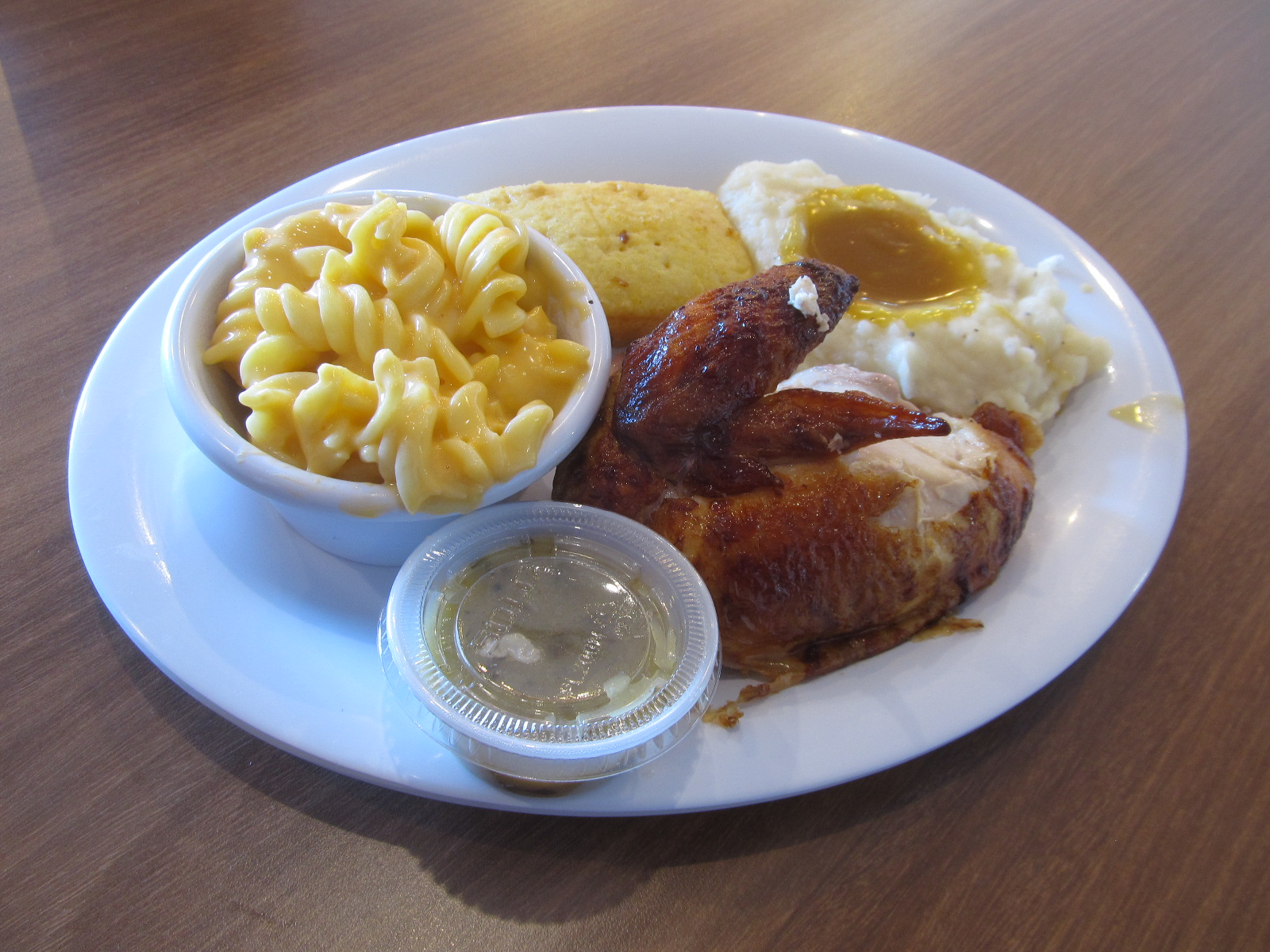
Quarter Chicken Meal, with macaroni and cheese, corn bread, and potatoes and gravy. The small container has rosemary lemon sauce.

Menu items offered at Boston Market included various meats and sides, such as rotisserie chicken (whole, half, or quarter), apple pie, carved chicken sandwich, chicken salad sandwich, chicken noodle soup, chicken pot pie, cilantro lime rice, creamed spinach, Cobb salad, cornbread, garlic dill potatoes, mashed potatoes (with gravy), meatloaf and meatloaf sandwich, desserts (salted caramel lava cake, chocolate cake, or chocolate chip cookies), prime rib, ribs (beef, with sauce), steamed vegetables (e.g., broccoli), sweet potato casserole, and turkey (roasted). Many of the chicken items included rotisserie chicken, and the rotisserie oven was also used to cook other meats. Boston Market offered rotisserie nuggets for a time.

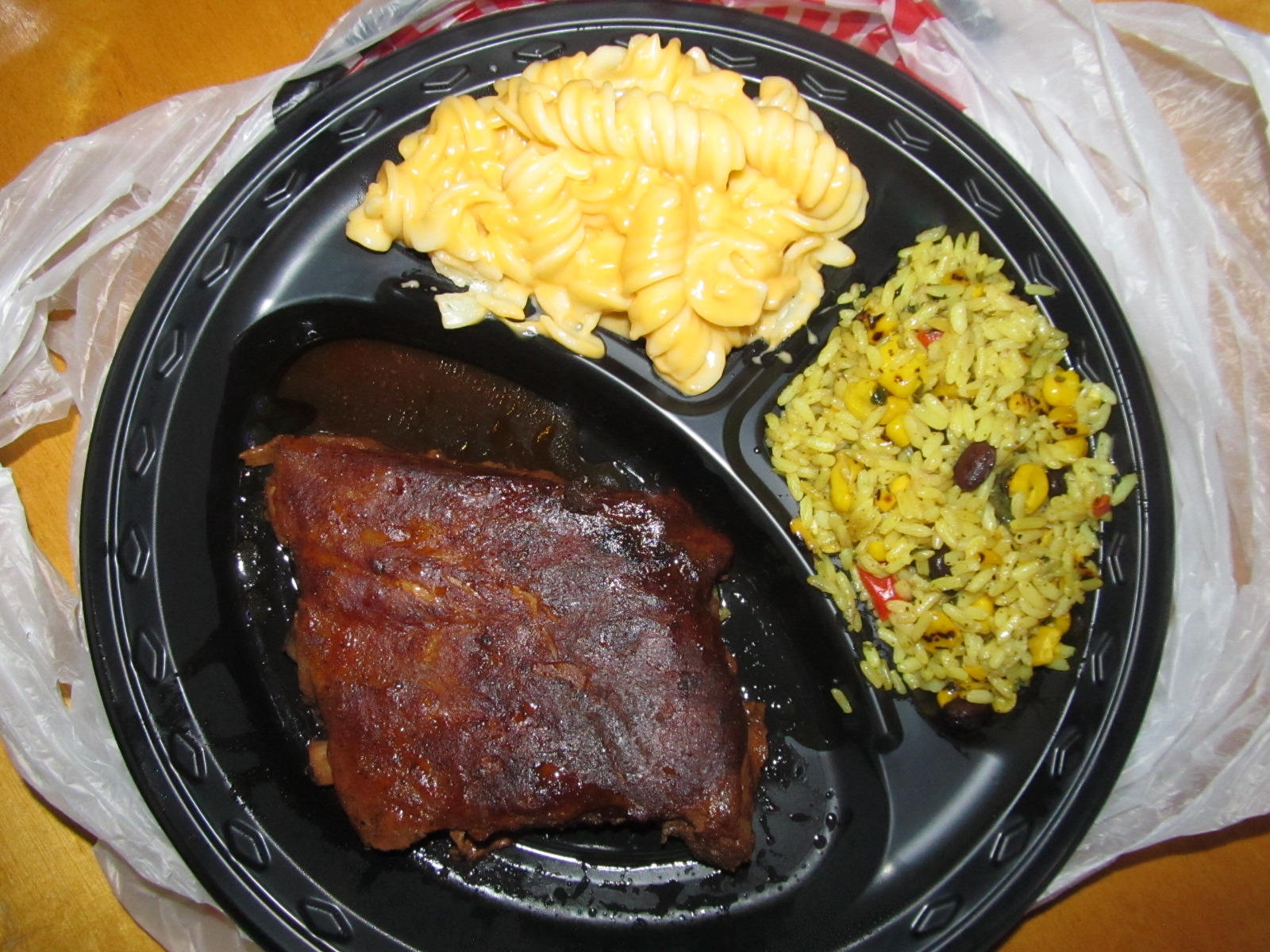
Boston Market ribs with mac n' cheese, and a rice, corn, and beans mix as sides

Boston Market also had seasonal holiday menu and catering food packages, such as for Thanksgiving dinner (a traditional U.S. holiday meal), which included items such as a whole rotisserie turkey, mashed potatoes, gravy, vegetable stuffing, spinach-artichoke dip, cranberry walnut relish, dinner rolls, and pumpkin and apple pies.

The Boston Market supermarket brand is produced by Bellisio Foods. As of 2024, it continues to produce items such as chicken pot pie bites, mashed potatoes, and chicken fajita rice bowls.

== Trademark dispute and grocery brand ==
In 2002, Boston Pizza commenced a lawsuit against Boston Market in the Federal Court of Canada over the trademark use of the word "Boston" in Canada. In its defense, Boston Market alleged that Boston Pizza's trademarks were invalid because it described a style of pizza from a specific area. The dispute continued after Boston Market ceased operations in Canada in 2004. The parties settled the dispute in 2008 under an agreement that Boston Market would not use the words "Boston" or "Boston Market" in Canada for five years for restaurants or any food or drink products (other than pre-packaged food products, but not including pizza and lasagna). Boston Market also agreed that it would not challenge Boston Pizza's use in Canada of any trademark that uses the words "Boston" or "Boston Pizza" (with certain exceptions).

== Financial problems of 2023–2024 ==
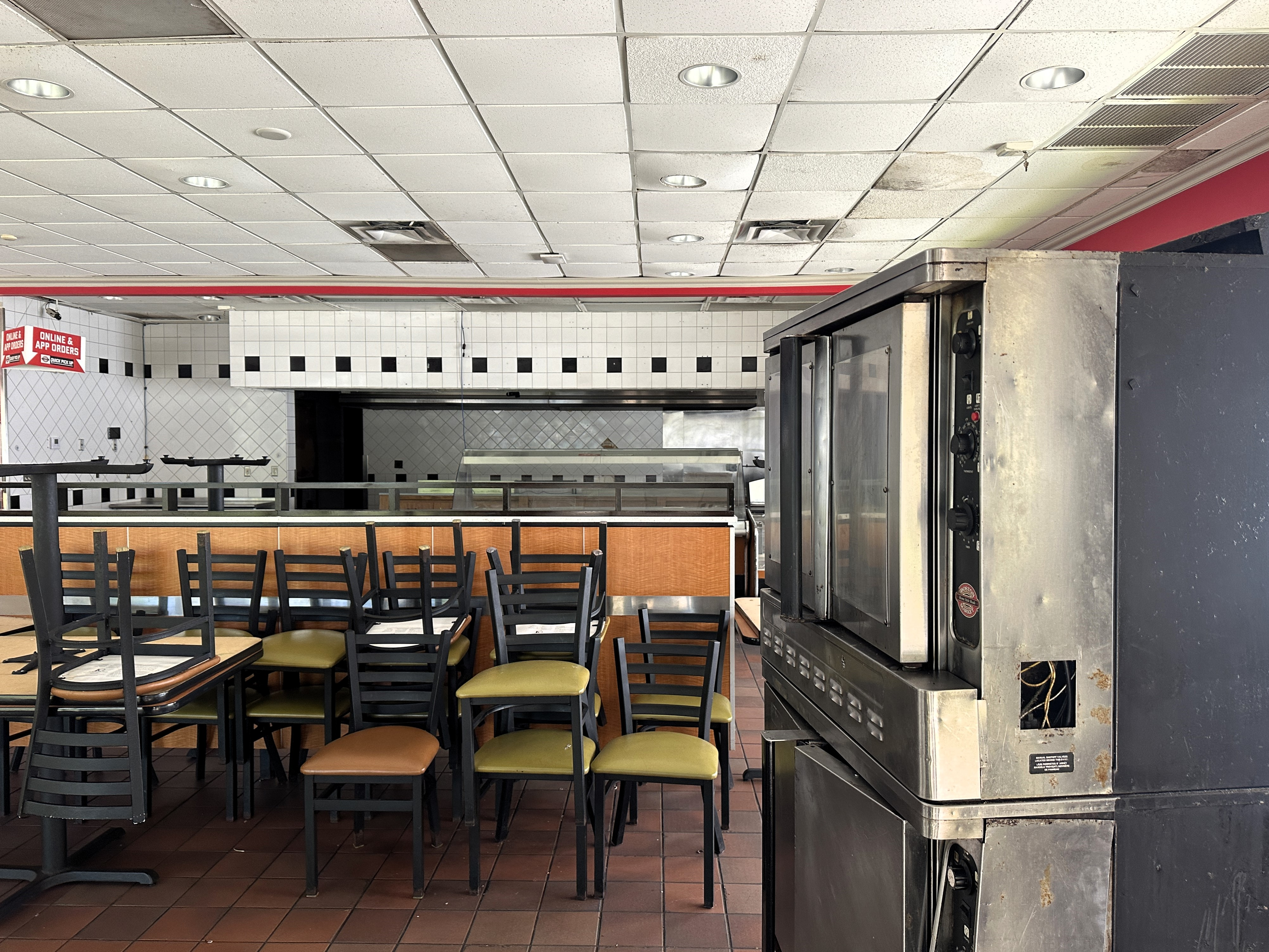
Closed down Boston Market, 2024

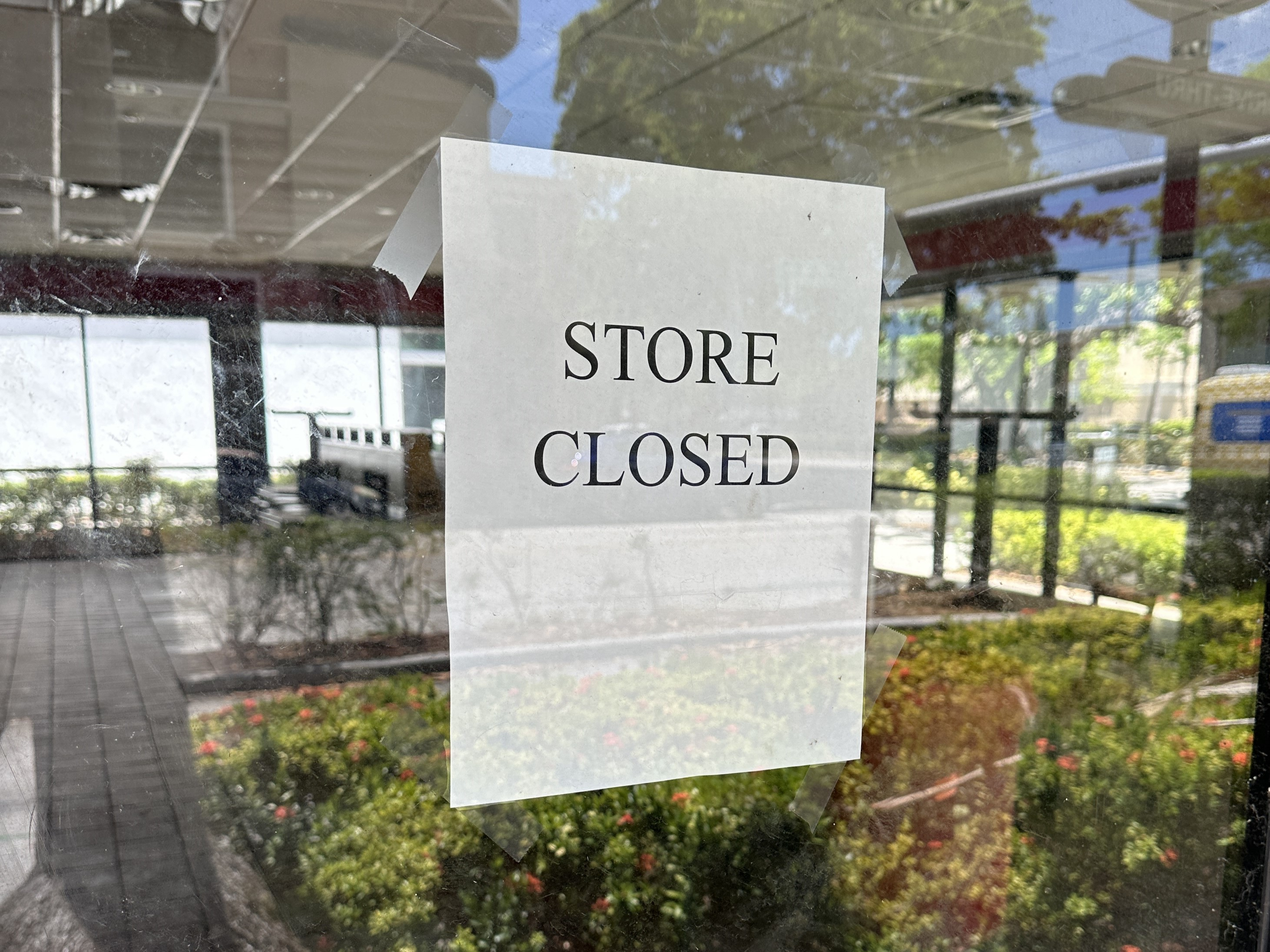
Note on the door of a Boston Market in Miami, May 2024

On July 3, 2023, a complaint was filed stating the Boston Market in Danbury, Connecticut, owed in excess of $61,000 in unpaid rent and connected charges. A ruling in the landlord's favor on July 28, 2023, led to an eviction.

On July 25, 2023, US Foods sued Boston Market for $11.3 million, accusing the company of owing them over $10 million for food distributed over several prior years.

On August 14, 2023, the New Jersey Department of Labor and Workforce Development issued a stop-work order at 27 of the 31 Boston Market stores in New Jersey over multiple violations of workers rights, including owed backpay of up to $607,471 to up to 314 employees. An investigation on the matter began in November 2022 when an employee in Mercer County filed a complaint. The affected employees have since been reimbursed for their lost wages, and the stores were allowed to re-open a month later.

In September 2023, investigative journalists of Restaurant Business Magazine revealed Pandya had over 200 lawsuits against him related to unpaid wages of employees, unpaid suppliers, and other violations related to his restaurants. The report described Pandya's ownership of Boston Market as "chaotic".

In November 2023, the company failed to pay workers in Massachusetts.

On November 14, 2023, all Detroit-area Boston Market locations were permanently shuttered and were handed eviction notices due to unpaid rent. On November 20, 2023, all 8 remaining Connecticut Boston Market locations, located in East Haven, Meriden, West Hartford, Wilton, Stratford, Milford, Bristol, and Newington, were permanently shuttered and issued eviction notices due to unpaid rent. Boston Market and owner Pandya filed for Chapter 11 bankruptcy in December 2023.

On January 10, 2024, the company announced that it would allow anyone to open a Boston Market franchise without the usual franchise fees or other buy-in requirements.

On January 11, 2024, Boston Market's bankruptcy case was dismissed after the company was unresponsive to court requests. On February 1, 2024, US Foods won its lawsuit against Boston Market, with federal judge Manish Shah saying that Boston Market's defenses in the lawsuit were "gossamer". On February 12, 2024, shortly after its second bankruptcy was dismissed, Boston Market filed for bankruptcy for the third time after losing the US Foods lawsuit.

On September 24, 2024, a U.S. bankruptcy judge dismissed Boston Market's appeal regarding a $15 million judgement awarded to US Foods, citing a "lack of prosecution" and Pandya's "bad faith," "delay tactics" and "willful disregard".

== See also ==
- List of casual dining restaurant chains
- List of chicken restaurants
