= Graciela de Holman =

Salvadoran businesswoman (died 2021)

Graciela "Chela" de Holman (1930/1931 – 19 March 2021) was a Salvadoran businesswoman and restaurateur. She co-founded the International Gastronomic Festival of El Salvador to promote Salvadoran cuisine at a gourmet standard.

== Career ==
Holman began working in the restaurant business at a young age. She started her first restaurant around 1970 with 1000 colónes, and went on to open several gourmet restaurants in the country: Le Mar, Siete Mares, La Tablita, Chalet Suizo, and Chela's. During the Salvadoran Civil War, some of the restaurants were targeted in bombings, forcing her to rebuild. She eventually expanded to Guatemala and opened a U.S. location of Chela's in Miami.

In 1994, Holman was a founding member of the Tourism Committee for the Chamber of Commerce and Industry of El Salvador. To promote Salvadoran cuisine, which was not well known abroad, she co-organized the first International Gastronomic Festival of El Salvador in that year. This festival became an annual event, and helped grow domestic restaurant offerings. Holman continued as a member of the organizing committee for later offerings of the festival. She also served as President of the Tourism Committee.

Over the course of her career, Holman won 27 professional awards. She also received the "Golden Palm" Award, the highest award from the Chamber of Commerce, in 1997. She remained a member of the Advisory Committee for the Chamber in later years, and advised the Ministry of Tourism as late as March 2021.

== Personal life ==
Holman had eight children, twenty-one grandchildren, and twenty-eight great-grandchildren. She died on 19 March 2021 at the age of 90.
