= Pius Alibek Hermez =

Iraqi philologist and restaurateur

Pius Alibek Hermez (Ainkawa, Iraqi Kurdistan, 1955) is an Iraqi philologist and restaurateur of Assyrian ethnicity. He studied English philology in Baghdad, and continued his studies afterwards in London. He has focused his career on comparative historical linguistics and the origin and evolution of languages. He arrived in Barcelona in 1981.

He has dedicated himself to the teaching of languages, giving classes in schools and in the university; to translations for El Periódico de Catalunya; and also to the program for the European Community program Manumed, which is dedicated to safeguarding the written heritage of the eastern Mediterranean. He is fluent in Aramaic, English, Arabic, Kurdish, Catalan, and Spanish.

Since 1997 he has operated the restaurant Mesopotamia, specializing in Iraqi cuisine, on Carrer de Verdi street in the Gracia neighborhood of Barcelona, Spain. He collaborates in the program "The Travelers of the Grand Anaconda" (Catalan: "Els Viatgers de la Gran Anaconda") of Catalunya Ràdio, where he hosts the segment "Travelling Words" (Catalan: "Paraules Viatgeres"), which explores how words were born and how they have evolved, especially words of Eastern provenance.

During the anti-war protests of 2003 he became a familiar figure in the struggle for peace. In 2004 he received the Medal of Honor of Barcelona (Catalan: Medalla d'Honor de Barcelona). He translated "The Yacoubian Building" by Egyptian author Alaa Al-Aswany into Catalan, and is the author of the book "Nomad Roots", published in Catalan by La Campana (Barcelona, 2010).
