= Silvio Kuhnert =

German singer

- Born: September 9, 1969 (age 56); Oelsnitz, Vogtland
- Genres: German folk
- Occupations: Musician, producer, chef
- Instrument: Singing
- Spouse: Viola
- Website: landhotel-taltitz.de

Silvio Kuhnert (born 9 September 1969 in Oelsnitz, Vogtland) is a German singer of popular folk music and a music producer. He is well known as "The Singing Publican" and is also the chef de cuisine in the country hotel, To the Green Tree in the small village Taltitz, situated in the Free State of Saxony in the region called Vogtland.

== Personal life ==
Silvio Kuhnert began his career as cook with the apprenticeship at the hotel "Fichtelberg" in the small town Oberwiesenthal in the Saxon region Erzgebirge (the ore mountains in English). In 1989 he was in the restaurant Rock Crystal "already the youngest chef de cuisine of the region Vogtland . In the following years, he passed different placements at prestigious restaurateurs, for example at the restaurant 'Aubergine' of Eckardt Witzigmann in Munich. In 1993, he passed in Passau (Bavaria) the examination for the formal title "Küchenmeister" (the master of kitchen in English) and became in the same year the executive director of kitchen at the IFA holiday hotel, Hohe Reuth" in Schöneck, a famous tourist location in Vogtland.

In 1995, he bought and opened his first own restaurant and enthused his guests as singing publican. Ten years later, the master of the kitchen was also a successful artist of popular folk music and opened in 2005 together with his partner at that time and today's wife Viola the restaurant and country hotel "To the Green Tree" in Taltitz.

== Media ==
=== CD-productions ===
- Heut lad ich Euch alle ein (1997) / in English: Today I invite you all
- Glaubst du daran? (2002) / in English: Do you believe in it?
- Ein guter Tag fängt morgens an (2004) / in English: A good day starts in the morning

=== Video/DVD-productions ===
Ein musikalisch-kulinarischer Streifzug durch das Vogtland (2008) / in English: An musically culinary expedition through the Vogtland

Several times Silvio Kuhnert had appearances as "The singing publican from the Vogtland“ with broadcast transmissions and telecasts, e.g. with the "Musikantenschenke" of the MDR (Central German Broadcasting) and gained numerous titles at different competitions.

=== Books ===
Silvio Kuhnert is the author of the regional typical cookbooks Von der Haselmühle zur Tanzermühle (From Hasel Mill up to Tanzer Mill) and Das Obere Vogtland Kochbuch (The Upper Vogtland Cookbook) published in 1998 and in 2010.
