= Lucia Pavin =

Italian chef

- Born: August 8, 1947 (age 77); Cittadella, Veneto, Italy
- Culinary career
- Cooking style: Cuisine classique; Nouvelle cuisine
- Website: www.alpalazzino.it

Lucia Pavin (born August 8, 1947) is an Italian chef. She is considered one of the first chefs to import nouvelle cuisine in Italy and combining it with Italian cuisine.

== Career ==
In 1963, she began working at Restaurant Al Palazzino in Galliera Veneta, a small municipality in the Province of Padua, in the Italian region Veneto, located about 30 miles northwest of Venice.

In 80’s she moved to France becoming a student under Roger Vergé. Then she studied at École de Cuisine du Soleil of Mougins before returning to work at Restaurant al Palazzino and, in 1982, won the international award Dionisio dell’Ospitalità.

She started working with the great master of Italian cuisine Gualtiero Marchesi. In 1994 she returned to France at Vergé’s École de Cuisine, earning the second master's degree in French cuisine.

In 1996 won the International cooking award.

In 2001 Luigi Veronelli, one of the most important Italian gastronome, assigned the special reward Il Sole for Lucia’s guineafowl stuffed with herbs and truffle.

In December 2005, the President of the Italian Republic conferred on Lucia the insignia of Cavaliere Della Repubblica (Order of Merit of the Italian Republic).

Since 90’s Lucia divulges Italian cuisine in the United States, especially in Boston and New York City. In 2013 represented Italy for the 30th sister city anniversary between Padua and Boston, preparing a dinner gala in the Boston Public Library.
