= Kuhnert Arboretum =

Arboretum and nature area in Aberdeen, South Dakota, United States

Coordinates: 45°26′20″N 98°28′32″W

- Interactive map of Kuhnert Arboretum
- Type: Arboretum
- Area: 19 acres (7.7 ha)

Kuhnert Arboretum is a 19-acre (7.7 ha) arboretum and nature area located at the corner of Melgaard Road and Dakota Street South, Aberdeen, South Dakota. The arboretum contains deciduous, coniferous, and ornamental trees, as well as large shrubs.

== See also ==
- List of botanical gardens in the United States
