= Restaurateur =

Person who opens and runs restaurants professionally

Occupation
- Occupation type: Business
- Activity sectors: Restaurants, business, culinary arts

Description
- Fields of employment: Restaurant
- Related jobs: Businessperson, chef

Restauranteur JW Roth in front of his Bourbon Room establishment.

A restaurateur is a person who opens and runs food and beverage service establishments professionally. Although over time the term has come to describe any person who owns a restaurant, it traditionally refers to a highly skilled professional who is proficient in all aspects of the restaurant business.

== Etymology ==
The French restaurateur comes from the Late Latin restaurator ("restorer") and from the Latin restaurare ("to restore"). Restaurateur is simply French for a person who owns or runs a restaurant. The feminine form of the French noun is restauratrice. A less common variant spelling restauranteur, which is a later formation from Anglicized forms, is formed from the "more familiar" restaurant, with the French suffix -eur ("one who") borrowed from restaurateur. It is considered by some to be an etymological error or misspelling, and the form restaurateur (without the n), the earlier form borrowed from French, is preferred in formal writing, especially in the United Kingdom. Restauranteur (with the n) is still widely used, including in formal British writing. The Oxford English Dictionary gives examples of this variant (described as "originally American") going back to 1837. H. L. Mencken said that in using this form he was using an American word rather than a French word.

== See also ==
- Foodservice
- List of restaurateurs
- National Restaurant Association
- Restaurant management
- The World's 50 Best Restaurants
