= Emilio's =

Defunct Italian restaurant in Los Angeles

Emilio's was an Italian restaurant in Los Angeles, founded and run by Emilio Baglioni. Emilio Baglioni opened his restaurant in 1968. Before opening Emilio's, Baglioni worked as a chef for Warner Brothers Studios. Baglioni was named "Best Restaurateur" by LA Weekly in 1983 for running Emilio's and retired from the restaurant in 1998.

== History ==
Emilio Baglioni previously worked as a chef, employed by Jack L. Warner of Warner Brothers Studios as the head of the commissary and executive dining room for Jack L. Warner, where he also provided food for actors and the crew during filming. When Warner retired from the studio in 1968, Baglioni opened his own restaurant under the name of "Emilio's" and remained at Warner Brothers. Baglioni retired from the restaurant in 1998.

=== Emilio Baglioni ===
Born May 4, 1932, in Macchia D'Aboreq, Valle Castellana, Abruzzo, Italy, died December 5, 2021, Las Vegas Nevada, the son of Domenico Baglioni (1886–1969) an engineer and farmer. Emilio's mother, Guiseppina Castelli, (1894–1938) died when Baglioni was 6 years old, she left 9 children. Baglioni grew up in the poor mountainous part of Abruzzo during World War II. When Mussolini's soldiers entered Abruzzo, Baglioni did not want to join the Black Shirts and was running an away when a Black Shirt shot him the leg. He fell down and rolled into a ditch. When the Black Shirt found him, he pointed his rifle at Emilio with the intent to kill him, a Partisan—member of the Italian resistance movement—shot the Black Shirt and saved Emilio's life. When a friendly local lady discovered Baglioni, she took him into her home to care for him. Afterwards, he returned to his family in the mountains where his father and brothers avoided Mussolini's fascist indoctrinations.

After the war, Baglioni moved to Rome where he went to architecture school then two years later he went to San Remo for hotel school and language study where he learned French and German. When he finished school, he went to work in Lausanne, Switzerland. Several years later, he was offered a job in London, England, where he learned English and worked at the Savoy Hotel. On September 23, 1959, he accepted a job offer as host / chef at the Four Seasons Restaurant in New York City. While employed at the Four Seasons he met many influential people, among them Jack Warner, of Warner Brothers Studios. Baglioni served as president of the California chapter of Ciao Italia, a worldwide organization formed for the purpose of generalizing Italian food, from 1979 to 1984.

== Reception ==
Baglioni was named "Best Restaurateur" by LA Weekly in 1983 for running Emilio's. Writing for the Los Angeles Times in 1989, Rose Dosti gave Emilio's a positive review for its low prices, while noting that "the roving musicians at Emilio’s are a tradition you simply tolerate". The restaurant guide Epicurean Rendezvous described Emilio's as "one of the top Italian restaurants in Los Angeles", stating that "it has hosted countless celebrities".
