= Institute of Contemporary Islamic Thought =

Islamic organization based in the United Kingdom

The Institute of Contemporary Islamic Thought (ICIT) is an Islamic research and activist center. ICIT describes itself as "international intellectual center of the global Islamic movement. It consists of individual activists, journalists and academics in all parts of the world who share a common commitment to developing the social and political ideas of the Islamic movement, and promoting them as an alternative worldview to that of Western civilization. Driven by the guidance provided in the Farewell Khutbah, much of the work of ICIT is to produce publications and provide programs that cultivate the Islamic personality, uphold economic justice, and protect social justice."

It was established in 1998 by the associates of Kalim Siddiqui (1931–1996), Director of The Muslim Institute in London. Members include director Zafar Bangash of Toronto, Ontario, Canada, Muhammad al-Asi and Imam Abdul Alim Musa of Washington, D.C., and Iqbal Siddiqui of London, now the editor of the Crescent International magazine.

Crescent International a monthly news magazine associated with the ICIT, published in Canada. It is the continuation of a local Toronto Pakistani community paper founded in the early 1970s, converted to an international news magazine by Kalim Siddiqui in 1980.

Siddiqui acted as editor from 1975 to 1998. An Arabic edition, called Al-Hilal Al-Dawli, was published from 1986 to 1989.

Between 1998 and 2008, Crescent International was edited by Iqbal Siddiqui. It is now managed by an editorial board consisting of Zafar Bangash, Afeef Khan and Imam Muhammad al-Asi. Other major contributors include Imam Muhammad al-Asi of Washington, D.C., whose tafsir is being serialised, M A Shaikh in London, and Perwez Shafi in Pakistan. Former editor Iqbal Siddiqui is now a columnist.

The publication has been subject of a controversy by B'nai Brith Canada as Crescent International has published many articles referring to homophobia, antisemitism and denying Israel's right to exist.

The newspaper is also published online, under the name "Muslimedia", and with a daily news analysis under crescent-online.net.

== See also ==
- Abdul Alim Musa
- As-Sabiqun
- Zafar Bangash
