= Delta Epsilon Psi =

American South Asian-interest collegiate fraternity

- ΔΕΨ
- Founded: October 1, 1998; 28 years ago University of Texas at Austin
- Type: Social
- Affiliation: NAPA
- Former affiliation: NIC
- Status: Active
- Emphasis: South Asian
- Scope: National
- Motto: "In Brotherhood Lies Our Strength"
- Pillars: Brotherhood, Discipline, and Commitment
- Colors: Navy blue and silver
- Symbol: Asiatic lion
- Chapters: 16
- Colonies: 17
- Members: 2,500+ active
- Headquarters: 909 W. 22nd Street; Austin, Texas 78705; United States
- Website: www.deltaepsilonpsi.org

Delta Epsilon Psi (ΔΕΨ) is a South Asian interest social and service fraternity located in the United States. Delta Epsilon Psi Fraternity, Inc. was founded on October 1, 1998 at the University of Texas at Austin.

== History ==
Delta Epsilon Psi Fraternity, Inc. was founded on October 1, 1998 at the University of Texas at Austin. Its eighteen founders formed the fraternity to provide a unified South Asian voice at the school. Delta Epsilon Psi's founding fathers were:

- Suju Abraham
- Rahul Brambhatt
- Vipul Engineer
- Irfan Iqbal
- Wesley Mathews
- Rushi Modha
- Samir Parikh
- Mayur Patel
- Rajiv Patel
- Rakesh Patel
- Ronit Patel
- Jason Pillai
- Vinu Raj
- Kashif Shaikh
- Asim Siddiqui
- Tosby Thomas
- Jacob Varghese
- Vijay Viswanathan

The purpose of Delta Epsilon Psi is to develop leadership qualities within its members by instilling within them the three pillars—Brotherhood, Discipline, and Commitment—upon which the fraternity was founded.

In April 2011, Delta Epsilon Psi officially became nationally recognized by the North American Interfraternity Conference (NIC). Delta Epsilon Psi left the NIC as of January 24, 2017 It is currently a member of the National APIDA Panhellenic Association (NAPA).

== Symbols ==
The motto of Delta Epsilon Psi is "In Brotherhood Lies Our Strength". Its pillars are Brotherhood, Discipline, and Commitment. The fraternity's colors are navy blue and silver. Its mascot is the Asiatic lion.

== Philanthropy ==
Delta Epsilon Psi's philanthropies are research towards curing juvenile diabetes through Breakthrough T1D (formerly known as the Juvenile Diabetes Research Foundation (JDRF)), and supporting the National Marrow Donor Program.

== Chapters ==
Following is a list of Delta Epsilon Psi chapters and colonies. Active chapters are indicated in bold. Inactive chapters and institutions are indicated in italics.

Chapter	Charter date and range	Institution	Location	Status	Ref.
**Founding**	October 1, 1998	University of Texas at Austin	Austin, Texas	Active	
Alpha	1998	University of Houston	Houston, Texas	Inactive	
**Beta**	2000	University of Texas at Dallas	Richardson, Texas	Active	
**Gamma**	2001	Texas A&M University	College Station, Texas	Active	
Epsilon	2002	University of Oklahoma	Norman, Oklahoma	Inactive	
**Zeta**	2003	Baylor University	Waco, Texas	Active	
Eta	2004	Oklahoma State University–Stillwater	Stillwater, Oklahoma	Inactive	
**Theta**	2005	University of South Florida	Tampa, Florida	Active	
Iota	2005	University of Texas at San Antonio	San Antonio, Texas	Inactive	
Kappa	2007	Rutgers University–New Brunswick	New Brunswick, New Jersey	Inactive	
**Lambda**	2008	University of Central Florida	Orlando, Florida	Active	
**Mu**	2008	Texas Tech University	Lubbock, Texas	Active	
**Nu**	2008	University of Miami	Coral Gables, Florida	Active	
**Xi**	2008	Drexel University	Philadelphia, Pennsylvania	Active	
Omicron	2008	Temple University	Philadelphia, Pennsylvania	Inactive	
Pi	2009	University of Texas at Arlington	Arlington, Texas	Inactive	
Rho	2009	University of Florida	Gainesville, Florida	Inactive	
Sigma	2009	University of the Sciences in Philadelphia	Philadelphia, Pennsylvania	Inactive	(Note: The university merged into Saint Joseph's University in June 2022.)
**Tau**	2009	New Jersey Institute of Technology	Newark, New Jersey	Active	
Upsilon	2009	Rutgers University–Newark	Newark, New Jersey	Inactive	
Phi	2009	Virginia Commonwealth University	Richmond, Virginia	Inactive	
Chi	2009	Pace University	Pleasantville, New York	Inactive	
**Psi**	2010	Kean University	Union Township, New Jersey	Inactive	
**Alpha Alpha**	2012	University of Georgia	Athens, Georgia	Active	
Alpha Beta	2010	Wayne State University	Detroit, Michigan	Inactive	
**Alpha Gamma**	2012	Georgia State University	Atlanta, Georgia	Active	
**Alpha Delta**	2012	The College of New Jersey	Ewing Township, New Jersey	Active	
Alpha Epsilon	2011	University of Connecticut	Storrs, Connecticut	Inactive	
Alpha Zeta	2011	St. John's University	Queens, New York City, New York	Inactive	
**Alpha Eta**	2011	Binghamton University	Vestal, New York	Active	
**Alpha Theta**	2012	New York Institute of Technology	Manhattan, New York	Active	
**Alpha Iota**	2012	University of Alabama at Birmingham	Birmingham, Alabama	Active	
**Alpha Kappa**	2013	University of Illinois Chicago	Chicago, Illinois	Active	
**Alpha Lambda**	2014	University of North Texas	Denton, Texas	Active	
Alpha Mu	2017	Mercer University	Macon, Georgia	Inactive	
**Alpha Nu**	2021	Georgia Tech	Atlanta, Georgia	Colony	
**Alpha Xi**	2021	University of Maryland, College Park	College Park, Maryland	Colony	
**Alpha Omicron**	2022	University of Southern California	Los Angeles, California	Colony	
**Alpha Pi**	2022	University of Illinois Urbana-Champaign	Urbana-Champaign, Illinois	Colony	
**Alpha Rho**	2024	University of South Carolina	Columbia, South Carolina	Colony	

== Notable members ==
- Asim Siddiqui, chairman and a founding trustee of the City Circle
- Vijay Viswanathan, diabetologist

== See also ==
- List of Asian American fraternities and sororities
- List of social fraternities
- Cultural interest fraternities and sororities
