= Abd al-Alim =

ʻAbd Al-ʻAlīm (ALA-LC romanization of Arabic: عبد العليم) is a male Muslim given name. It is built from the Arabic words ʻabd and Al-ʻAlīm, one of the names of God in the Qur'an, which give rise to the Muslim theophoric names. It means "servant of the All-knowing".

It may refer to:

- Abdul Aleem Siddiqi (1892–1954), Bangladeshi Sufi teacher
- Abdulalim A. Shabazz (1927–2014), American mathematician
- Abul Fayez Mohammad Abdul Alim Chowdhury (1928–1971), Bangladeshi eye specialist
- Abdul Alim (folk singer) (1931–1974), Bengali folk musician
- Abdul Alim Musa (born 1945), American Muslim activist
- Issam Abdel-Tawab Abdel Alim, full name of Issam Alim, convicted in Egypt for terrorist offences
- Abdul Aleem (professor) (former Vice-Chancellor of Aligarh Muslim University)
- Abdul Aleem (politician), Pakistani politician
- Abdul Aleem Farooqui, Indian Islamic scholar
- Abdul Aleem Khan, Pakistani politician and businessman
- Abdul Aleem Khan (Pakistani politician from Hyderabad)
- Abdul Alim (politician), Bangladeshi politician
- Abdul Alim Al-Razi, Bangladeshi lawyer and politician
- Abdul Alim Musa, Muslim American activist
- Md. Abdul Aleem, Bangladeshi politician

== See also ==
- Masjid Abdul Aleem Siddique, mosque in Singapore
- Aleem Khan (disambiguation)
