= Asim Siddiqui =

British Pakistani businessman and politician

Asim Siddiqui (born 1976 in Kettering, England) is a British Pakistani chairman and a founding trustee of the City Circle, a network of young British Muslim professionals established in 1999. In addition to running local educational and welfare projects, the City Circle organises weekly public discussion forums providing a grassroots outlet for debate on issues of mutual concern between British Muslim communities and wider society. Asim is responsible for the strategic direction of the City Circle. All of the City Circle projects are committed to inculcating constructive citizenship and building bridges between communities.

Siddiqui is a member of the International Institute for Strategic Studies and has spoken at numerous think tanks including the Royal United Services Institute, Demos and the Fabian Society. He was appointed to the Iraq Commission by the Foreign Policy Centre. Asim is regularly interviewed by the BBC, Sky news and various radio stations. Asim contributes to The Guardian and New Statesman web blogs. Time magazine placed Asim on its front page in 2008 as part of a cover piece on "Europe's Muslim Success Story".

Siddiqui is a member of the prime minister's UK-Indonesia Islamic Advisory Group. He has participated in Foreign & Commonwealth Office international delegations projecting British Muslims. Asim has been nominated to take part in the United States' International Visitor Leadership Program.

Siddiqui graduated at University College London and qualified as an accountant at PricewaterhouseCoopers. He is now a fellow of the Association of Chartered Certified Accountants and a qualified member of the Securities & Investment Institute. He works full-time for a major Arab bank in the city.

Siddiqui is married with two sons. His father, Ghayasuddin Siddiqui is leader of the Muslim Parliament of Great Britain.

== Awards and nominations ==
In January 2014, Siddiqui was nominated for the Services to Finance and Accounts award at the British Muslim Awards.
