= Ghayasuddin Siddiqui =

Indian-British academic and political activist (1939–2026)

Ghayasuddin Siddiqui (1939 – 18 April 2026) was an Indian-born British academic and political activist. He was leader of the Muslim Parliament of Great Britain, which he co-founded in 1992, and director of one of the oldest Muslim think-tanks in Britain, The Muslim Institute, which he co-founded in 1973.

Ghayasuddin Siddiqui organised the visit of Malcolm X to Sheffield University on 4 December 1964.

After the death of unrelated writer Kalim Siddiqui in 1996, Ghayasuddin Siddiqui, who had been involved with the Muslim Institute from its early days, became the Director and re-established the Institute as an independent organisation.

The Institute established a number of important organisations that have played a significant part in shaping the British Muslim community – including the Muslim Parliament of Great Britain, The Halal Food Authority, and Bait al-Mal al-Islami, which raised funds and supported young Muslim scholars and students. It even organised guided tours to ‘Islamic Britain’ with visits to London’s Guildhall, Leighton’s Arab Hall, Burton’s Mausoleum, Shah Jehan Mosque, Abdullah Quilliam Mosque and other sites. Under Ghayasuddin Siddiqui's guidance, the emphasis of the Institute shifted to issues of democracy, human rights, freedom of speech, pluralism, gender equality and empowering women. The Institute launched a number of initiatives, including campaigns for "Child Protection in Faith-Based Environments" and against forced marriage, domestic violence, and honour killing. A new "Model Muslim Marriage Contract," which grants equal rights to both partners, was also produced. The Institute subsequently played a role in the formation of the City Circle, British Muslims for Secular Democracy and The MUJU Crew (a Muslim–Jewish theatre group).

== Background ==
Ghayasuddin Siddiqui was born in Delhi, British India in 1939. He migrated to Pakistan on partition in late 1947, and moved to the United Kingdom in 1964.

Siddiqui died at his home in Chesham, Buckinghamshire, on 18 April 2026, at the age of 86.

== Learned Society ==
In 2009, Ghayasuddin Siddiqui invited some of the old founding members as well as others who had been involved with the Muslim Institute to a Planning Conference to debate how the Institute should move forward. It was held in December 2009 at Sarum College in Salisbury. In his opening speech, Ghayasuddin Siddiqui emphasised that we should look towards the future but learn, and re-learn, some of the lessons of the Institute’s history.

After three days of debate and discussion, it was determined that the Institute would be a network devoted to pluralistic thought, creativity, excellence and high achievement; and a community of Fellows dedicated to ideas and debate that places pluralistic, argued and considered positions in the public space.

Siddiqui championed Muslim social issues and civil liberties such as an end to forced marriages. He was the first Muslim leader to join the Stop the War Coalition, joining its inaugural Central Committee. Siddiqui was patron of the Guantanamo Human Rights Commission, and a commissioner on the Commission on British Muslims and Islamophobia. He was a founding trustee of British Muslims for Secular Democracy.

== Halal Food Authority ==
Ghayasuddin Siddiqui was a founding member and first chair of the Halal Food Authority. A history of which was published in the Critical Muslim journal in 2024.
