= American Dream, Global Nightmare =

Book by Ziauddin Sardar

- Author: Ziauddin Sardar, Merryl Wyn Davies
- Publisher: Icon Books
- Publication date: 2004

American Dream, Global Nightmare is a book by Ziauddin Sardar and Merryl Wyn Davies (Icon Books, 2004). It presents the neoconservative ideology of Pax Americana as ten laws.
