= The Muslim Institute =

Intellectual organisation in London, United Kingdom

The Muslim Institute, a registered charity, is a Fellowship society of thinkers, academics, artists, creatives and professionals. It aims to promote and support the growth of thought, knowledge, research, creativity and open debate within the Muslim community and wider society. The Institute emphasises the diversity and plurality of Islam and Muslims to promote dialogue, cooperation and collaboration between Muslims and other cultures and within Muslim communities. Through its Winter Gatherings, Ibn Rushd Annual Lectures, meetings, quarterly Critical Muslim, and energetic website it seeks to provide a forum for critical thought, sharing of ideas, expertise and interests among its Fellows and the wider community. (Charity Reg. No. 1137088). The fellowship society modelled on "futawwah" clubs, groups that promoted a virtuous life based on knowledge, humility, magnanimity, hospitality, social work and the service of humanity during the Islamic Golden Age. The Institute promotes pluralism, innovation and creativity while also encouraging open debate and discussion on issues pertaining to Islam, Muslims and Muslim societies.

== History ==
The Muslim Institute was established in 1973. Its original title was the Muslim Institute for Research and Planning and its aim was to promote thought and long-range planning on the problems of the Muslim societies.

A Preparatory Committee issued a Draft Prospectus in 1974 arguing that ‘there is an urgent need to revive a tradition of Muslim scholarship to produce a philosophical framework which is at least as articulate and rationally satisfying as all the other traditions of knowledge that are current today’. The Prospectus also argued that ‘a prior commitment to the epistemology of Islam (or framework of knowledge) is a necessary starting point in the search for alternative social, economic and political systems for Muslim societies’.

During this early phase the Muslim Institute published ground breaking work on science policy, economic development, social change, Islamic movements, and the future of Muslim civilisation.

However, things changed dramatically after the Iranian revolution. The then Director, Dr Kalim Siddiqui (writer), became a strong supporter of the Iranian revolution, leading to a spilt in the Institute. Many founding members, including Ziauddin Sardar, left the Institute.

After the death of Kalim Siddiqui in 1996, Dr Ghayasuddin Siddiqui (no relation), who was involved with the Institute from its early days, became the Director and re-established the Institute as an independent organisation.

The Institute established a number of important organisations that have played a significant part in shaping the British Muslim community – such as the Muslim Parliament, The Halal Food Authority, and Bait al-Mal al-Islami, which raised funds and supported young Muslim scholars and students. It even organised guided tours to ‘Islamic Britain’ with visits to London’s Guildhall, Leighton’s Arab Hall, Burton’s Mausoleum, Shah Jehan Mosque, Abdullah Quilliam Mosque and other sites. Under Ghayasuddin Siddiqui's guidance, the emphasis of the Institute shifted to issues of democracy, human rights, freedom of speech, pluralism, gender equality and empowering women. The Institute launched a number of initiatives, including campaigns for "Child Protection in Faith-Based Environments" and against forced marriage, domestic violence, and honour killing. A new "Model Muslim Marriage Contract," which grants equal rights to both partners, was also produced. The Institute subsequently played a role in the formation of the City Circle, British Muslims for Secular Democracy and The MUJU Crew (a Muslim–Jewish theatre group).

== Learned Society ==
Shortly afterwards, Ghayasuddin Siddiqui invited some of the old founding members as well as others who had been involved with the Institute to a Planning Conference to debate how the Institute should move forward. It was held in December 2009 at Sarum College in Salisbury. In his opening speech, Ghayasuddin Siddiqui emphasised that we should look towards the future but learn, and re-learn, some of the lessons of the Institute’s history.

After three days of debate and discussion, it was determined that the Institute would be a network devoted to pluralistic thought, creativity, excellence and high achievement; and a community of Fellows dedicated to ideas and debate that places pluralistic, argued and considered positions in the public space.

== Today ==
The Muslim Institute Aims & Objectives are:

- to explore, debate and discuss the pressing intellectual problems and issues facing British Muslim communities and wider society; encourage and support the pursuit of excellence in knowledge and thought as an agent of positive change;
- to provide an intellectual space where problems and issues can be discussed from multiple perspectives, with the freedom to raise even the most sensitive questions, frankly and openly in the spirit of mutual respect and tolerance;
- to raise awareness of the great intellectual and cultural heritage of Islam, and bring the considerable storehouse of knowledge developed by Muslim civilisations to the attention of current generations and the wider public in a spirit of critical inquiry;
- to mobilise the academic, cultural, and intellectual resources, the scientific and technological expertise of British Muslims to facilitate the creation of a thriving, dynamic and forward-looking Muslim community;
- to promote the civilisational and humanistic dimensions of Islam to create a contemporary culture of intellectual and critical thought within the Muslim community;
- to search for a contemporary Muslim ethos that enables critical engagement with policy issues bearing directly on the British Muslim community and make a distinctive contribution to the debates of British society;
- to support academic workers, public intellectuals, policy practitioners, professionals, creative thinkers and researchers of today and of tomorrow.

== 50 years on ==
In December 2023, the Muslim Institute organised a 50th anniversary to mark this historic milestone at its annual Winter Gathering in Salisbury. Many of the speakers during the weekend residential were there at the start of the Institute's journey in 1973 and had flown in from the Middle East, North America and Africa. They were joined with key activists who had built Muslim political, social and community organisations in the UK across the decades. Also taking part was Bosnia’s Grand Mufti Emeritus Mustafa Cerić.

=== Motivation ===
The founders and their associates were concerned about the decline and decay of Muslim societies. They argued that past Islamic civilizations were based on knowledge, and they were keen to rebuild this foundation of knowledge and innovation. They emphasised the urgent need for an articulate and rationally satisfying tradition of Muslim scholarship and argued that Muslim intellectuals had the potential for "recreating fully operational social, economic and political systems of Islam in all Muslim societies".

The Muslim Institute is an independent organisation, funded by the small income generated from its assets accumulated since its early days and the fees paid by its Fellows.

== Leadership ==
- Mufti Barkatullah (chair)
- Hassan Mahamdaille (director)

Trustees include:

- Ziauddin Sardar

== See also ==
- Kalim Siddiqui (writer)
- Ghayasuddin Siddiqui
- Ziauddin Sardar
