= Muju =

Muju may refer to:

== Places ==
- Muju County, South Korea
- Muju Resort, South Korea

== Other uses ==
- Mujū (1227–1312), Japanese Buddhist monk
- Muju virus
- The MUJU Crew

== See also ==
- Muyu language
