= International Journal of Diabetes in Developing Countries =

Open-access medical journal

- Discipline: Diabetology
- Language: English

Publication details
- Former name: Diabetes Bulletin
- History: 1981–present
- Publisher: Springer Science+Business Media
- Frequency: Quarterly
- Open access: Yes

Standard abbreviations
- ISO 4: Int. J. Diabetes Dev. Ctries.

Indexing
- ISSN: 0973-3930 (print); 1998-3832 (web)
- LCCN: 2009243751
- OCLC no.: 47093854

Links
- Journal homepage; Online access

International Journal of Diabetes in Developing Countries is a peer-reviewed open-access journal published on behalf of the Research Society for the Study of Diabetes in India. The journal was established in 1981 as the Diabetes Bulletin by the founding editor M. M. S. Ahuja. The journal publishes articles on the subject of experimental and clinical aspects of diabetes and its complications.

The journal is abstracted and indexed in Academic OneFile, CAB Abstracts, EBSCO Databases, Global Health, Health Reference Center Academic, Science Citation Index Expanded, and Scopus.
