= As-Sabiqun =

Founder
- Abdul Alim Musa

Religions
- Islam (Islamic fundamentalism)

The As-Sabiqun Liberation Movement, also known simply as As-Sabiqun (Arabic: السَّابِقُونَ), is a small American fundamentalist Muslim organization under the leadership of founder Imam Abdul Alim Musa, based in Washington, D.C., and with branches in Philadelphia, Los Angeles, San Diego, Sacramento, and Oakland (led by Amir Abdul Malik Ali).

As-Sabiqun is identified as a hate group by the Southern Poverty Law Center. The group says its "paramount goal" is the "establishment of Islam as a complete way of life in America"; its leader Abdul Alim Musa has frequently promoted antisemitic conspiracy theories.

== History ==
The organization was created by African-American Imam Abdul Alim Musa (born Clarence Reams), who converted to Islam while serving a federal prison sentence for drug trafficking. Musa established the Masjid Al-Islam mosque in southeast Washington, in 1995. The name As-Sabiqun means "the vanguard" in Arabic.

== Activities ==
One of As-Sabiqun's major ongoing projects is its support of Jamil Al-Amin, once known as H. Rap Brown. Al-Amin was a Minister of Justice for the Black Panther Party in the 1960s, currently serving a life sentence for the March 2000 murder of Georgia sheriff's deputy, Ricky Kinchen. As-Sabiqun believes that Al-Amin was falsely targeted and convicted.

The group also speaks on college campuses (notably UC Irvine) against Israel and Jewish Americans and in support of Hamas, Hezbollah, the Islamic Jihad Movement in Palestine, and Iranian President Mahmoud Ahmadinejad (see below). Malik Ali expressed contempt for the two-state solution. Furthermore, Malik Ali supported the notion of "jihad on the UCI campus." In response, UCI Chancellor Michael V. Drake issued a statement condemning Malik Ali's "remarks supporting terrorism [as] deplorable."

== Allegations of antisemitism ==
The Anti-Defamation League (ADL) describes the Sabiqun as an "anti-Semitic Muslim group that advocates for the creation of a global Islamic state" and notes that their leaders have recently become popular speakers on college and university campuses and that they use that platform to promote hostility toward Israel and American Jews.

The ADL and Southern Poverty Law Center have characterized statements attributed to the leaders of the As-Sabiqun organization, and specifically Imams Amir Abdul Malik Ali and Abdul Alim Musa, as antisemitic. According to the ADL, Malik Ali has suggested numerous times that Jews control the media, government, and economy of the United States. He also expressed support for the conspiracy theory that Israel was responsible for the September 11 attacks.

On March 13, 2010, Malik Ali, as a guest of the Muslim Student Union at UC Irvine, gave a speech on the campus and made remarks advancing his belief that Jews were involved in the execution of the September 11 attacks, as well as indicating his support for the Hamas (a group listed on the U.S. State Department's as a terrorist organization), and for the destruction of the State of Israel. Many, including administrators at UCI, considered this an "endorsement of terrorism."

== See also ==
- Crescent International
- Abdul Alim Musa
- Siraj Wahaj
- W.D. Muhammad
- Jamil Al-Amin
- Hamid Algar
