= Monica Witt =

American defector and former airman (born 1979)

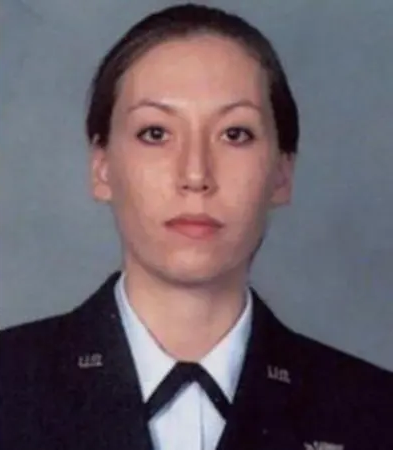
- Witt before her defection
- Born: Monica Elfriede Witt; April 8, 1979 (age 47); El Paso, Texas, U.S.
- Other names: Fatemah Zahra; Narges Witt; Wayward Storm
- Education: University of Maryland, College Park (BA); George Washington University (MA)
- Criminal charges: Espionage; Fraud; Aiding and abetting
- Military career
- Branch: United States Air Force
- Years: 1997–2008
- Rank: Technical Sergeant
- Conflicts: 2003 invasion of Iraq

Monica Elfriede Witt (born 8 April 1979) is a former defense contractor and intelligence Technical Sergeant of the United States Air Force who defected to Iran in 2013 and is currently a top FBI fugitive wanted for a 2018 indictment of espionage against the United States. From 2003 and 2008, her work involved counterintelligence assignments that took her to the Middle East. United States assistant attorney general John Demers charged Witt in 2018 and claims she likely provided Iran with the existence of a “highly classified intelligence collection program” and the identity of a US intelligence officer, “thereby risking the life of this individual.”

Born in Texas, Witt enlisted in the US Air Force in 1997 as a linguist and studied the Persian language at the Defense Language Institute before becoming an Airborne Cryptologic Language Analyst. She was then assigned to the Air Force Office of Special Investigations as an enlisted counterintelligence special agent until separating from the Air Force in 2008. She continued working in intelligence as a military contractor until 2010.

After her 2012 conversion to Islam in Iran, Witt became increasingly focused on the religion and the region. Her master's degree capstone presentation lauded them both, and she was soon affiliated with Marzieh Hashemi, a suspected Iranian intelligence operative. With Hashemi's assistance, Witt defected to Iran in 2013 and provided the Islamic republic with assistance and intelligence stemming from her work for and with the US government.

== Personal life ==
Monica Elfriede Witt was born on 8 April 1979 in El Paso, Texas. The New York Times reported that her mother died shortly before Witt entered active duty in 1997, and that she had "drifted from her relatives" by 2008. The New York Times reported that in 2011, "[Witt's] finances were a mess." She moved into poor-quality subsidized housing in Falls Church, Virginia, and was homeless at one time.

In a 2013 interview with the International Quran News Agency, Witt described herself as a non-practicing Christian as of her US military enlistment. She said that it was a mission to Iraq and a desire to understand Iraqis that prompted her to study the Quran. Witt described her enthusiasm for the Islamic holy book, saying it "impressed me so much that I would have never imagined. I became so interested in the Quran that I studied it every night." Witt described her friends, family, and the US military as influenced by "extensive" anti-Iranian and anti-Islamic propaganda in the US, and unaccepting of her religious turn. The United States Department of Justice (DOJ) alleged that Witt appeared on television in Iran and converted to Islam there.

The DOJ indictment listed "Fatemah Zahra" and "Narges Witt" as aliases by which Witt has also been known. The New York Times' Adam Goldman reported that, "Inside the government, some officials called her 'Wayward Storm.'".

== Education ==
According to her curriculum vitae, Witt has a bachelor's degree from University of Maryland, College Park, a master's degree from George Washington University (GWU), and Persian-language certification from the Defense Language Institute.

When Witt returned from Iran to her studies at GWU, she had "transformed." Now wearing hijabs and speaking highly of Iran and her conversion to Islam, she was described by her classmates as "extreme." Another student in Witt's graduate program said that Witt's capstone presentation was a "love letter to Iran" that downplayed the threat potential of that nation's nuclear energy program; when Witt received strong pushback from her committee members, "she was almost offended that the assumption that Iran was a peace-loving nation would even be questioned […] She was visibly upset."

== Career ==
As both a servicemember and civilian contractor, Witt worked with military intelligence and had access to "ongoing counterintelligence operations and the true names of intelligence assets and the identities of American officials involved in their recruitment."

=== US Air Force ===
Witt joined the United States Air Force in August or December 1997. As part of her Air Force specialization, Witt was given access to SECRET and TOP SECRET "national defense information relating to the foreign intelligence and counterintelligence of the United States, including HUMINT containing the true names of intelligence sources and clandestine agents of the [United States Intelligence Community]." From approximately February 1998 – April 1999, Witt was assigned to the Defense Language Institute to be trained in the Persian language. Between May 1999 – November 2003, Witt deployed several times to conduct classified missions and collect signals intelligence on US enemies.

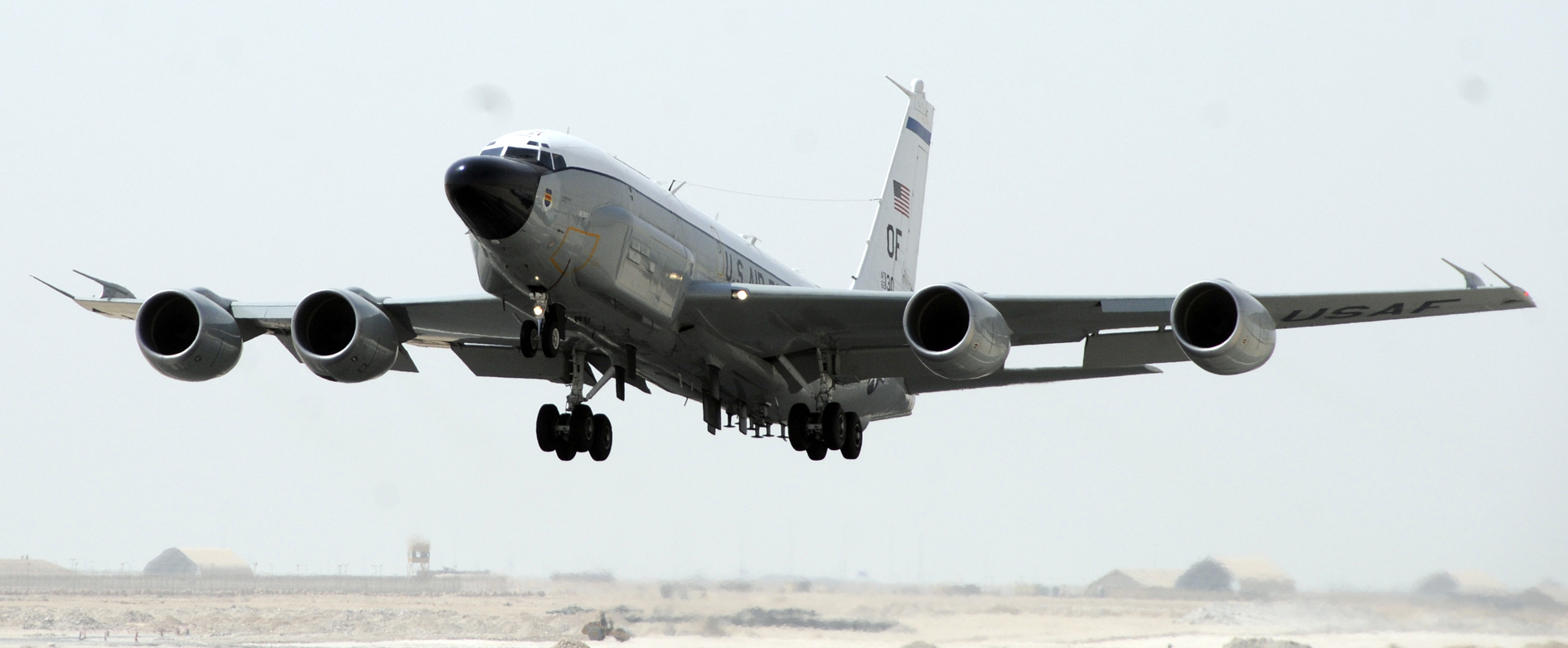
An RC-135 Rivet Joint from the 763d Expeditionary Reconnaissance Squadron, August 2008

During the early days of the Iraq War, Staff Sergeant Witt was an Airborne Cryptologic Language Analyst deployed to the 95th Reconnaissance Squadron, stationed at Crete Naval Base. When war broke out on 20 March 2003, the following three weeks saw sustained, major combat operations, and Witt was an aircrew member of a Boeing RC-135V/W Rivet Joint. For this duty, Witt was awarded the Air Medal.

Staff Sergeant Monica E. Witt distinguished herself by meritorious achievement while participating in sustained aerial flight from March 29 to April 18. During this period, the airmanship and courage of Sergeant Witt in the successful accomplishment of these important reconnaissance missions in support of Operation IRAQI FREEDOM, under extremely hazardous conditions, demonstrated her outstanding proficiency and steadfast devotion to duty. The professional ability and outstanding aerial accomplishments of Sergeant Witt reflect great credit upon herself and the United States Air Force.

Witt was transferred to Andrews Air Force Base from Offutt Air Force Base in November 2003, and began her assignment as an Air Force Office of Special Investigations (OSI) special agent, focusing on criminal investigation and counterintelligence. Witt continued deploying, conducting classified operations in the Middle East, and had access to a special access program (SAP) "[housing] classified information, including details of ongoing counterintelligence operations, true names of sources, and the identities of U.S. agents involved in the recruitment of those sources." Witt retained access to the SAP, acting as its OSI Desk Officer even after her enlistment, until August 2010.

Witt's declassified deployments

Throughout her service with the US military, Witt deployed to Saudi Arabia, Diego Garcia, Greece, Iraq, and Qatar. In addition to her Air Medal, Witt received three Air Force Commendation Medals and three Aerial Achievement Medals. Witt separated as a Technical Sergeant in either June or March 2008. Speaking to the International Quran News Agency in 2013, Witt claimed that her desire to convert to Islam and pushback therefor were driving factors in her decision to leave the Air Force.

=== Civilian ===
For the rest of 2008, Witt worked in Maryland for Booz Allen Hamilton as a defense contractor, "consulting on 'Iranian subject matter' and providing 'language and cultural specialisation'." Witt next worked for a contractor, Chenega Federal Systems, as a "Middle East Desk Officer [who] supervised, controlled, and coordinated the execution of highly sensitive counterintelligence operations against foreign intelligence services worldwide". Upon leaving the employ of United States Intelligence Community entities in August 2010, Witt lost her TOP SECRET/SCI security clearance.

Until May 2011, she worked for the nonprofit organization AMIDEAST, submitting "applications for 60 Iraqi Fulbright Program candidates to multiple US universities". In 2012, she published two articles in GWU's International Affairs Review. Press TV also published an article by Witt in which she accused the United States Armed Forces of having "a prevailing culture of tolerance for sexual harassment".

== Defection ==
At George Washington University (GWU), Witt's classmates described her as withdrawn and quiet, though when she spoke about her military service, she described "drone strikes, extrajudicial killings and atrocities against children, all of which […] her colleagues in the military would brag about. She seemed distressed by what she called 'gross incompetence' by her superiors during her time abroad." All of this allegedly gave Witt insomnia. Witt described herself as an isolated woman conflicted about her self-concept and sense of belonging.

Witt traveled to Iran in February 2012 to attend an International Conference on Hollywoodism that condemned the morality of the United States, promoted anti-Americanism, included an anti-Western sentiment, and "propagate[d] anti-Semitism and conspiracy theories including Holocaust denial". The conference was orchestrated by the "New Horizon Organization", and its sponsor was the Islamic Revolutionary Guard Corps (IRGC). Mike Gravel, a former United States Senator, was another attendee of a Hollywoodism conference; he said of the IRGC there, "They were very sophisticated, and they've got young people, well-appearing people speaking English beautifully, […] They're equipped to do the job of intelligence work, and if they find vulnerable people, they just capitalize on it." Nader Talebzadeh, an organizer of the conference, would later say that Witt did not seem genuine in her exuberance about Iran and Islam.

While in Iran, Witt was voluntarily video-recorded identifying as a US military veteran and making statements critical of the federal government of the United States. These statements and her conversion to Islam were broadcast on Iranian television that same month. Contemporaneous with her graduation from GWU, the Federal Bureau of Investigation (FBI) warned Witt that she was a target of Iranian intelligence recruiting; Witt assured US authorities she would not give sensitive information to Iran. Within a month, Witt was hired by American-Iranian journalist and television presenter Marzieh Hashemi "in connection with the filming of an anti-American propaganda film that was later aired in Iran."

From June 2012 through August 2013, Witt was regularly communicating with an Iranian American; this individual held dual citizenship and acted in ways consistent with being an Iranian intelligence operative. The New York Times identified this person as Hashemi. In her communications with Hashemi, Witt suggested she might leak intelligence data to the media ("If all else fails, I just may go public with a program and do like Snowden"), or defect to Russia instead ("I just hope I have better luck with Russia at this point. […] I think I can slip into Russia quietly if they help me and then I can contact wikileaks from there without disclosing my location.")

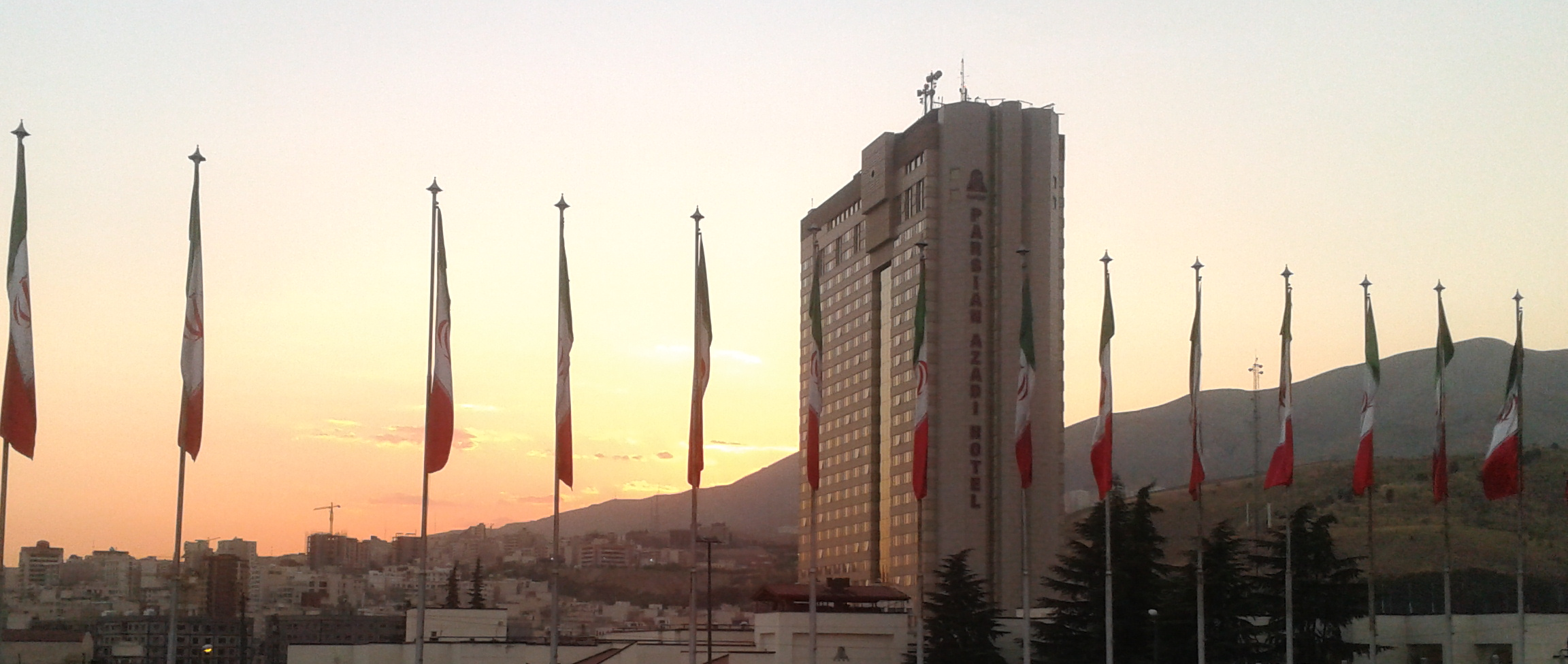
Parsian Azadi Hotel, August 2015

Witt attended another Hollywoodism conference at the Parsian Azadi Hotel in February 2013. While in Tehran, she spoke with Kevin Barrett; he reported that she said "she had been involved in horrific war crimes with the Air Force, […] And she just felt really bad about it." Witt also participated in more, similar anti-American videos as before. Beginning in July 2013, Witt repeatedly searched Facebook for former counterintelligence coworkers, including an intelligence operative who worked with Witt's previous special access program, and the spouse of another. On 25 August 2013, Witt emailed Hashemi with evidence of her good faith, genuineness, qualifications, and/or achievements, as well as a "conversion narrative", a chronological work history, and Witt's DD Form 214. Nine minutes later, Hashemi forwarded the email to "an email address associated with Iran." On 28 August 2013, Witt boarded a flight from Dubai to Tehran ("I'm signing off and heading out! Coming home ☺.") and officially defected to Iran.

Witt's US friends last heard from her in the summer of 2013 when she was in Afghanistan or Tajikistan teaching English as a second or foreign language; they reported her missing after several months of non-communication. Before the unsealing of the indictment against her, Witt was the subject of an FBI missing person case. As part of their appeal to the public, the FBI announced that Witt had previously traveled to the United Arab Emirates and Iran.

On 9 July 2018, a grand jury was convened in the United States District Court for the District of Columbia to evaluate eight counts of Title 18 charges brought against Witt and four others. This sealed indictment (United States of America v. Monica Elfriede Witt) was released on 13 February 2019, detailing the charges of espionage, fraud, and aiding and abetting. As of February 2019, Witt remained a fugitive from a US warrant for her arrest, and the US government believed she still resided in Iran. In April 2019, Hashemi denied having a hand in recruiting Witt. In May 2026, the Federal Bureau of Investigation announced a $200,000 reward for information leading to Witt's apprehension and prosecution, and said she remained at large.

== Iranian espionage ==
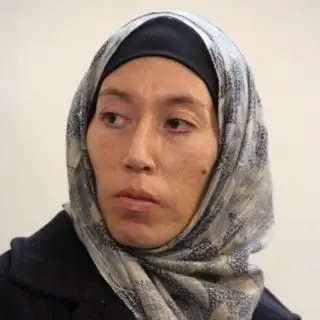

Immediately upon her arrival in Iran, Witt was furnished with "housing and computer equipment, in order to facilitate her work on behalf of the Government of Iran." She promptly told officials the code name and mission of the United States Department of Defense special access program to which she previously had access: classified US intelligence operations against a specific target. From January 2014 through May 2015, Witt used fraudulent Facebook accounts to investigate intelligence personnel and prepare "target packages" for Iran to use and attempt recruitment. Witt also gave Iran the classified true name and counterintelligence activities of a US Intelligence Community operative. These disclosures were categorized by the FBI's executive assistant director for national security as having the potential to "cause serious damage to [United States] national security". Witt is also alleged to have been involved in the questioning of ten United States Navy sailors captured in the 2016 U.S.–Iran naval incident.

In 2019, it was believed that Witt was working with the cyberwarfare group Phosphorus (also called Charming Kitten among other names). In October 2019, Microsoft announced that Phosphorus had spent that August and September attempting to compromise accounts associated with a candidate in the 2020 United States presidential election (TechCrunch noted that only Donald Trump and Mark Sanford were known to use Microsoft's email services). By 2021, some Central Intelligence Agency officials believed Witt had exposed their informants and disrupted their intelligence-gathering in Iran.
