= Zafar Bangash =

Islamic journalist and imam

- ظفر بنگش
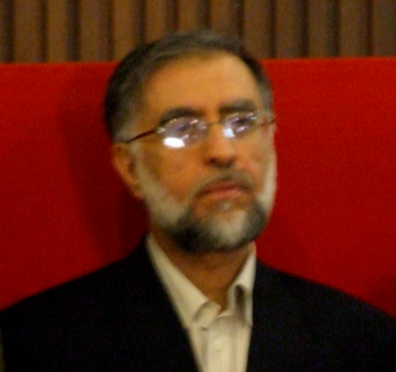
- Bangash in 2009
- Born: 1950
- Occupation: Imam

Zafar Bangash (Urdu: ظفر بنگش; born 1950) is an Islamic movement journalist and commentator in Toronto, Canada. Bangash is Director of the Institute of Contemporary Islamic Thought (ICIT), and is former president of the Islamic Society of York Region, a suburb of Toronto. He also served as Imam at the Islamic Society of York Region's Mosque and community centre in Richmond Hill, Ontario. He relinquished his responsibilities with the Islamic Society of York Region in 2019 to devote full time to research in Seerah (life-history) for the Prophet of Islam. He is a former editor of Crescent International newsmagazine, and a Trustee and formerly assistant director of the Muslim Institute, London, where he worked with Dr. Kalim Siddiqui (1931–1996), the founder of the Muslim Institute and Leader of the Muslim Parliament of Great Britain. Bangash is also a co-founder of the Muslim Unity Group.

He is best known for his commentaries on current affairs while editor of Crescent International. Though he stepped down as editor since joining the ICIT, he continues as a columnist and contributor to Crescent.

== Activities ==
In 2007, as a spokesperson for the Muslim Unity Group in Toronto, Bangash appeared with other Muslim leaders at a Toronto press conference calling for the Ontario government and Toronto District School Board to address the problem of increased harassment of Muslims and racial minorities since the September 11th attacks.

He was the keynote speaker at a 2007 Marxist conference in Toronto, prompting Bangash critic Tarek Fatah of the liberal Muslim Canadian Congress to comment, "For atheists, considered worthy of the death penalty by Islamists, to team up with their ultimate opponents in attacking Canadian civic society, demonstrates the fundamental bankruptcy of these two political ideologies." Bangash justified his collaboration with secular leftists saying "The issues of justice, inequality and poverty are common themes we can work together on. They are concerns of conscience."

Bangash was the focus of controversy when his association with a planned mosque in Newmarket, Ontario was used as a rallying point by opponents attempting to convince the municipality to rescind zoning approval for the building. A group called "Concerned Citizens Against Terror for Citizens of Newmarket" led by Ron Banerjee of the Canadian Hindu Advocacy and Meir Weinstein of the Jewish Defence League organised protests and a public meeting against the mosque's construction. Banerjee claimed that Bangash himself posed a "clear and present danger to the safety and security" of the country. The protest group was accused by one community member of not being members of the community and coming in from outside for the purpose of "stirring the pot". Mosque leaders have said that while Bangash is president of the Islamic Society of York Region to which the new mosque belongs, he is not the mosque's imam and has no direct involvement with the facility.

In June 2007, the Canadian Arab Federation (CAF) honoured Bangash at a gala dinner for his "unwavering" support of Palestine. CAF President Khaled Mouammar also defended Bangash, stating that "he is a man of dignity" and that "he has no blood on his hands like those Israeli war criminals who come to Canada and are received by our politicians, like Ariel Sharon."

On 14 February 2010, at a conference entitled "Media War on Islam," Bangash stated the "Israeli-owned" International Consultants on Targeted Security runs security at Amsterdam airport, and therefore "the Israelis are in control of security," and thus allowed Umar Farouk Abdulmutallab to board a Detroit-bound plane with concealed explosives.

== Views ==
=== Support for the Iranian Government ===
Bangash is a supporter of the 1979 Islamic revolution in Iran and has called for Islamic revolutions in other countries, stating that "Muslims must strive to overthrow the oppressive systems in their societies through Islamic revolutions, and not by participating in fraudulent elections organized by the elites operating through various political parties that actually divide the people." Tarek Fatah describes him as the "unofficial spokesperson for the Iranian regime in Canada." However, Bangash has denied being an advocate of creating an Islamic theocracy telling the Toronto Star "I am suggesting not necessarily an Iranian-style theocracy but I am advocating that people in the Muslim world should get rid of their corrupt regimes in the same way as the people of Iran got rid of the corrupt regime of the shah, of course."

In 2004, the Toronto District School Board proposed the introduction of "anti-homophobia education" at a downtown Toronto school. Bangash supported the right of Muslim parents to exclude their children from classes discussing families with same-sex parents. "We don't want our children subject to that kind of thinking. It's very clear in our belief that marriage is between a man and a woman. It goes against the core beliefs of Muslims; our understanding springs directly from the Qur'an," said Bangash.

=== United States ===
Bangash opposes the United States, calling it "the greediest, most exploitative, most manipulative, most hypocritical and most ruthless power that the world has ever known." He has also written that "unless the US and Israel realise that their murderous policies, far from cowing the Muslims, will only intensify hatred for them, there will be peace neither in the Muslim world nor for the US and its zionist surrogate, Israel."

In an interview with the Islamic Republic of Iran Broadcasting (IRIB), Bangash stated that:

"the imam's [Ayatollah Khomeini] designation of the U.S. as a great Satan was very precise. It emerged from a very careful study and understanding of the behaviour of the United States government and its policies down the generations...It has perpetrated over there [in Iraq] under the guise of delivering democracy and freedom when tens of thousands if not hundred of thousands of innocent people have been murdered in cold blood similar crimes are being perpetrated in Palestine by the US support of the Zionist occupiers of Palestine... It is an evil power that it needs to be dealt with and it needs to be continued and put in its place."

He told the National Post that he believes that the US government knew of Osama bin Laden's plans to launch the 9/11 attacks in advance and allowed them to occur to provide a pretext for attacking Afghanistan.

In an interview with the Islam Times in October 2010, Bangash stated that "There is little doubt that the US is in terminal decline. Financially it is bankrupt and living on borrowed money. Its military has been defeated in Iraq and Afghanistan and stretched to the limit...Politically, the US is virtually in a state of civil war." He further stated that "As the US and the West suffer defeat at the hands of Muslims in such places as Iraq, Afghanistan, Lebanon and elsewhere, they will become more oppressive toward Muslims living in their midst." He also stated that the decline of the United States "offers a great opportunity for Muslims to reclaim the high moral ground in global politics and lead errant humanity to its salvation."

In August 2012, Bangash spoke at an Al-Quds Day protest held outside the American Consulate in Toronto, where he stated (to cheers of "Allahu Akbar"):

"I want to send this clear message to this Satanic power whose representatives are hiding in that building: that your days are also numbered; you will see....America is destined to the dustbin of history...And when America goes, Israel goes, because Zionist Israel is dependent on America.

At a protest outside the American consulate in Toronto on 22 September 2012, Bangash praised the crowd, stating that "You fulfilled your duty today and you delivered a slap on the face of our enemies whether they are in the United States or the Zionist state of Israel."

=== Israeli-Palestinian conflict ===
In an article published in 2001, Bangash rejected the idea of a two-state solution or a power-sharing arrangement between Jews and Palestinians. He referred to Israelis as "thieves and bandits from Europe and America" and should go "back where they came from:the US, Canada Europe, Russia, or whoever is willing to take them in." Bangash has also stated that "Zionist thugs will have to vacate every inch of Palestine if there is to be justice (and therefore peace) in that tortured land." At the Toronto Peace & Justice Conference in March 2006, Bangash gave a speech in which he stated that "for the state of Israel, peace would mean when all the Palestinians have been put into the graveyard, six feet down."

On the question of suicide bombing, Bangash told the Vancouver Sun that he opposes the targeting of innocent civilians. He argues that suicide bombing is an act of desperation by a people who do not have the tanks, aircraft and advanced weaponry – "it's the Israelis who have them, they are using them, and people under occupation have the right under international law to resist their occupiers." He also claimed that suicide bombers usually attack military targets. In the same speech, Bangash expressed his vision that Israel will cease to exist and will be replaced by an Islamic regime, stating that:

“Allah willing, I see that day when we, the Muslims, will march on Palestine and liberate Palestine for all the people in the world. For the Jewish people, for the Christian people and for the Muslim people, they will all be living as equal citizens.”

At an Al-Quds Day rally held in August 2013, Bangash stated that Queen's Park has become a "Zionist occupied territory" and that charged that Canadian Prime Minister Stephen Harper and Ontario Premier Kathleen Wynne "are leading Canada in the wrong direction." Bangash also called for the rally's participants to "continue to speak for the Palestinians under oppression" until "all of Palestine is liberated from Zionist occupation" and predicted that "Zionism will be eternally shamed."

=== 2006 Israel-Lebanon War ===
Bangash was active in protests against the 2006 Israel-Lebanon war and at one point elicited cheers when he announced the number of Israeli soldiers killed by Hezbollah forces during the conflict.

=== Criticism of Taliban and Osama bin Laden ===
Bangash has criticised the Taliban and Osama bin Laden by saying their strategy was "the most stupid approach to take because you cannot convince the U.S. by attacking the U.S. You cannot force the U.S. to change its policies; you have to change your own situation in Muslim countries." He has also criticised Bin Laden's call for jihad against the West saying "An individual cannot issue a jihad... Only highly qualified scholars respected through the Muslim world can do that, not somebody sitting on some mountain."

=== Canadian intervention in Afghanistan ===
Bangash has spoken at rallies which oppose Canada's role in the invasion of Afghanistan and call for a national referendum on Canada's continued participation in the war.

== Relationship with non-Muslims ==
Bangash told the Toronto Star that when his Richmond Hill mosque opened, he and his congregation "went out of our way to contact the neighbours, contact the churches, Jewish groups, all kinds of people. We have invited to this centre United Church ministers to come and speak, Mennonite pastors to come and speak." In 2005, the mosque held a service in which every member of the congregation was asked to bring someone who was non-Muslim. Speaking to reporter Michael Valpy, Bangash said that the mosque was packed and that "The congregation was thrilled by the result". Following the 9-11 attacks a Mennonite pastor, Gordon Alton, contacted the mosque. Bangash, in his words, "stretched the rules of Islam" to the limit and asked Alton to preach at the mosque. "I think never in history had that been done before," Bangash said, "but I felt we needed to return [his] gesture."

Peter Leibovitch, who is Jewish and a long-time friend of Bangash, has defended him against his critics saying "we live in a free society and have the right to different positions," adding that many in the Jewish community don't support decisions made by the Israeli government. "And a lot of Jews are not happy with (U.S. President) George Bush's new militarism... Zafar Bangash doesn't agree with American foreign policy nor do millions of Canadians. I didn't know it's a crime not to agree with George Bush."

== Books and booklets ==
- The Makkah massacre and future of the Haramain (1988)
- In pursuit of the power of Islam : major writings of Kalim Siddiqui (1996)
- The seerah, a power perspective : papers (2000)
- The concepts of leader and leadership in Islam (2001)
- Power manifestations of the Sirah : examining the letters and treaties of the Messenger of Allah (2011)
- The covenant of Madinah and the inclusivist Islamic state (2011)
- Imam Khomeini and centrality of leadership in the Islamic movement (2011)
- The doomed kingdom of the house of Saud (2015)
