= Ziauddin Sardar =

British-Pakistani writer and cultural critic (born 1951)

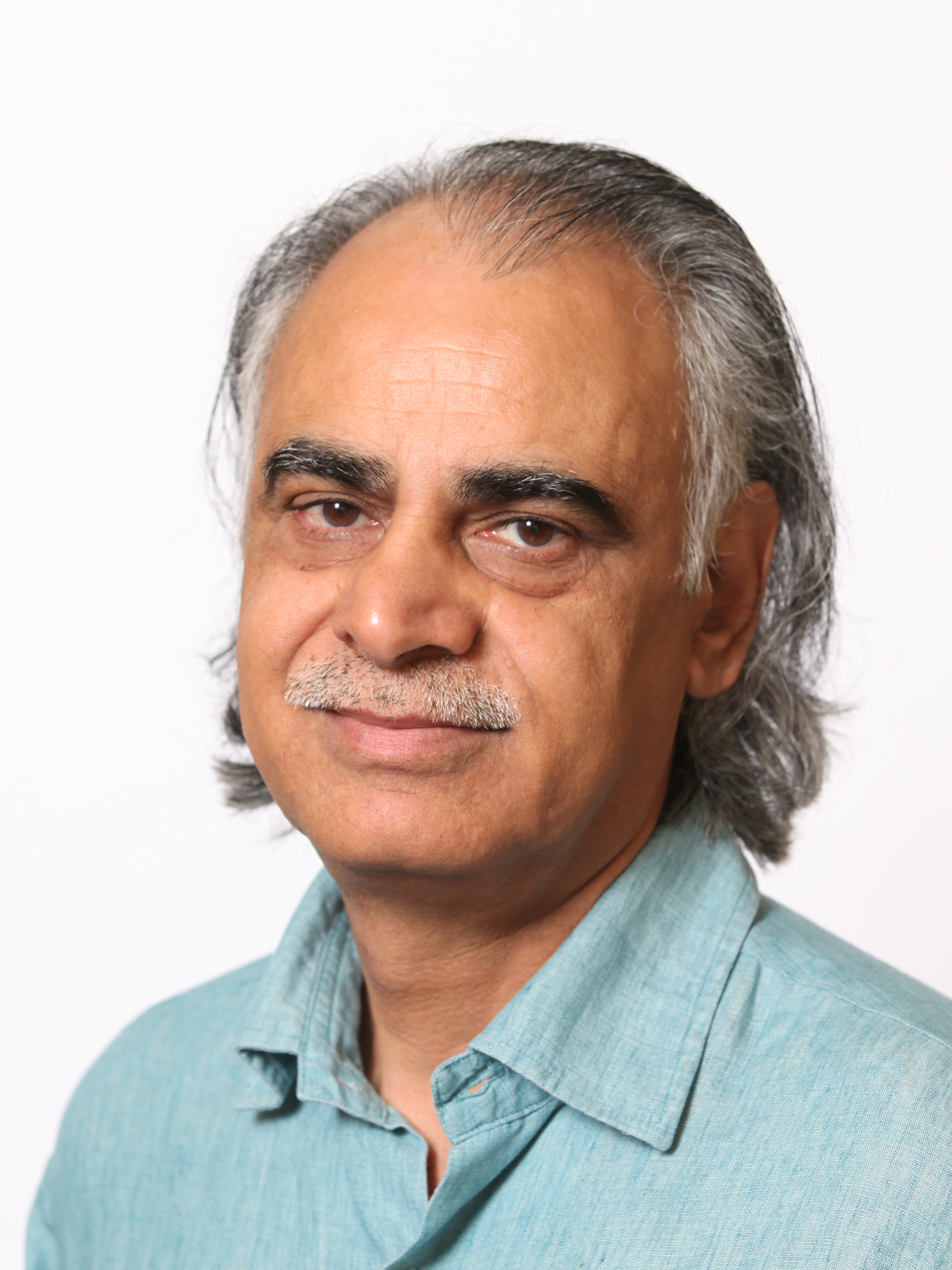
- Sardar in 2013
- Born: 31 October 1951 (age 74); Dipalpur, Punjab, Pakistan
- Other name: Zia
- Education: City University, London
- Occupations: Scholar; writer; cultural critic
- Website: ziauddinsardar.com

Ziauddin Sardar (Urdu: ضیاء الدین سردار; born 31 October 1951) is a British-Pakistani scholar, award-winning writer, cultural critic and public intellectual who specialises in Muslim thought, the future of Islam, futures studies, Critique of modernity, postmodernism and science and cultural relations. He has written and edited more than 60 books. Prospect magazine named him as one of Britain's top 100 public intellectuals and The Independent newspaper called him: 'Britain's own Muslim polymath'.

In 2012, he launched the influential quarterly, Critical Muslim, which is published by Hurst Publishers and the Muslim Institute, as a paperback book. In 2014, Sardar established The Center for Postnormal Policy and Futures Studies which focuses on his recent work on Postnormal Times. In 2025, he was appointed Director, International Institute of Futures Studies, International Islamic University Malaysia (IIUM)

== Biography ==
=== Early life ===
Ziauddin Sardar was born in Dipalpur, Punjab, Pakistan. He was educated and brought up in Britain. His family belonged to the Pashtun warrior clan of Durrani. His grandfather served in the Indian Army during the British Raj, and the family's surname was changed to Sardar, Urdu for Leader, in recognition of his courage. Sardar's grandfather served under William Birdwood when he was a junior officer in the Indian Army, and when his son emigrated to Britain, he sought out the company of Birdwood's son, Christopher and his daughter-in-law, Lady Birdwood.

Sardar, when growing up in 1960s London, was lectured by Lady Birdwood on his English. In 1968, she tried to recruit him into her anti-immigration crusade. Sardar angrily rejected her offer, and she never returned. Sardar was bullied as a teenager by "Paki-bashing" white youths. Sardar argued that Lady Birdwood's thesis that to be British was to be white was the "quintessence" of Britishness.

He read physics and then information science at the City University, London.

=== Working life ===
He worked for five years at King Abdul Aziz University, Jeddah, Saudi Arabia, becoming an authority on the hajj. He returned to work as Middle East correspondent of the science magazines Nature and New Scientist. In 1982, he joined London Weekend Television and helped launch the Asian programme Eastern Eye. In the early 1980s, he helped to found Inquiry, a magazine focusing on Muslim countries.

In 1987, Sardar moved to Kuala Lumpur as an advisor to Anwar Ibrahim, then Minister of Education for Malaysia. He came back to London in the late 1990s to work as Visiting Professor of Science Studies at Middlesex University, and write for the New Statesman, later becoming columnist on the magazine. In 1999, he was appointed editor of Futures journal, and became involved in Third Text, a journal of arts and visual culture, which he co-edited till 2005. Also in 1999, he moved to City University London, London, as Visiting Professor of Postcolonial Studies.From 2001 to 2013, he was Professor of Law and Society in the School of Law at Middlesex University.

After leaving London Weekend Television, Sardar wrote and presented programmes for the BBC and Channel 4. He conceived and presented Encounters With Islam for the BBC in 1983, and two years later his interview series Faces of Islam was broadcast on TV3 (Malaysia) and other channels in Asia. In 1990, he wrote and presented a programme on Islamic science for BBC's Antenna; his Islamic Conversations was broadcast on Channel 4 in 1995. He wrote and presented Battle for Islam, a film for BBC2 in 2005. He wrote Between the Mullahs and the Military, a 50-minute documentary on Pakistan for Channel 4's Dispatches series. He made the documentary The Life of Muhammad for BBC2, broadcast in July 2011. He has appeared on television programmes including the Andrew Marr Show and Hard Talk, and was a member of the 'Friday Panel' on Sky News World News Tonight in 2006 and 2007. He has appeared in filmed philosophical debates at the Institute of Art and Ideas.

Sardar was a Commissioner of the UK's Equality and Human Rights Commission (March 2005 – December 2009); and served as a Member of the Interim National Security Forum at the Cabinet Office, London, in 2009 and 2010. His journalism and reviews have appeared in The Guardian, The Independent, The Times, the UK weekly magazine, New Statesman and the monthly magazine New Internationalist. Sardar's online work includes a year-long project for The Guardian, 'Blogging the Qur'an', published in 2008.

In 2009, Sardar re-launched the Muslim Institute as a learned society, and became the Chair of the Muslim Institute Trust. He launched, in 2011, the quarterly Critical Muslim, jointly published by the Muslim Institute and Hurst & Co. In 2014, he established The Centre for Postnormal Policy and Futures Studies.

National Life Stories conducted an oral history interview (C1672/32) with Sardar in 2016 for its Science and Religion collection held by the British Library. In 2025, Sardar was appointed Director, International Institute of Futures Studies (IIFS), International Islamic University Malaysia (IIUM).

== Life and thought ==
Sardar describes himself as a 'critical polymath'. Science journalist Ehsan Masood suggests that Sardar 'deliberately cultivates a carefully calculated ambiguity projecting several things at once, yet none of them on their own'. Futurist Tony Stevenson points out that his 'intellectual aggression' hides a 'sincere and deep humanity': 'while his cultural analysis is surgically incisive, it is largely free of the theoretical correctness of academic thought', and that while he 'draws on a depth of academic thought', he 'always remains accessible'.

The fundamental principle of Sardar's thought is that 'there is more than one way to be human'. 'I do not regard "the human" either as "the" or as a priori given', he has said. 'The western way of being human is one amongst many. Similarly, the Islamic way of being human is also one amongst many. The Australian aboriginal way of being human is also another way of being human. I see each culture as a complete universe with its own way of knowing, being and doing – and hence, its own way of being human'. The corollary is that there are different ways of knowing. The question that Sardar asks is: 'how do you know? The answer depends a great deal on who 'you' are: 'how you look at the world, how you shape your inquiry, the period and culture that shapes your outlook and the values that frame how you think'.

He has produced over sixty books during a period of 40 years, some with his long-time co-author Merryl Wyn Davies. These books include the classic studies The Future of Muslim Civilisation (1979) and Islamic Futures: The Shape of Ideas to Come (1985), a vigorous intellectual assault on postmodern thought, Postmodernism and the Other (1998) and Orientalism (1999), and the international bestseller Why Do People Hate America? (2002). Mecca: The Sacred City (2014) won the first prize at the Lahore Literature Festival in 2014 and the Ramnath Goenka Award for Excellence in Journalism for a non-fiction book. He was the editor of the journal Futures from 1999 to 2012.

== Books ==
  - An Introduction to Future Studies, CPPFS/IIIT, Kuala Lumpur, 2026
  - An Introduction to Islamic Futures, CPPFS/IIIT, Kuala Lumpur, 2026
  - Editor, (with Shamim Miah and C Scott Jordan), The Postnormal Reader Volume 2, CPPFS/IIIT, London, 2024
  - Three Begums: The Women Who Shaped My Life, Hurst, London, 2025.
  - A Person of Pakistani Origins, Hurst, London, 2018
  - Editor, The Postnormal Times Reader, CPPFS/IIIT, London, 2017
  - (with Jeremy Henzell-Thomas), Rethinking Reform in Higher Education, IIIT, London, 2017
  - Islam Beyond the Violent Jihadis, Biteback, London, 2016
  - Mecca: The Sacred City, Bloomsbury, London, 2014
  - Future: All That Matters, Hodder Education, London, 2013
  - Muhammad: All That Matters, Hodder Education, London, 2012
  - Muslims In Britain: Making Social and Political Space, Routledge, London, 2012 (edited with Waqar Ahmad)
  - Reading the Qur’an, Hurst & Co, London; Oxford University Press, New York, 2011
  - Breaking the Monolith: Essays, Articles and Columns on Islam, India, Terror and Other Things That Annoy Me, ImprintOne, Delhi, 2008
  - Balti Britain: A Journey Through the British Asian Experience, Granta, London, 2008
  - How Do You Know? Reading Ziauddin Sardar on Islam, Science and Cultural Relations Archived 9 September 2017 at the Wayback Machine, Pluto Press 2006 (Introduced and edited by Ehsan Masood). ISBN 978-0-7453-2515-6.
  - What Do Muslims Believe? Granta, London, 2006.
  - Desperately Seeking Paradise: Journeys of a Sceptical Muslim, Granta, London, 2005
  - Islam, Postmodernism and Other Futures: a Ziauddin Sardar reader, Pluto Press, London 2004 (introduced and edited by Sohail Inayatullah and Gail Boxwell).
  - The A to Z of Postmodern Life: Essays on Global Culture in the Noughties, Vision, 2002
  - Aliens R Us: The Other in Science Fiction Cinema, Pluto Press, London, 2002 (Edited with Sean Cubitt)
  - The Third Text Reader on Art, Culture & Theory, Continuum, London, 2002 (Edited with Rasheed Araeen and Sean Cubitt)
  - The Consumption of Kuala Lumpur, Reaktion Books, London, 2000.
  - Thomas Kuhn and the Science Wars, Icon Books, Cambridge, 2000
  - Orientalism (Concepts in the Social Sciences Series), Open University Press, 1999
  - Rescuing All Our Futures: The Future of Future Studies, Adamantine Press, London
  - Postmodernism and the Other: New Imperialism of Western Culture, Pluto Press, London, 1997
  - Explorations in Islamic Science, Mansell, London, 1989; Centre for the Studies on Science, Aligarh, 1996
  - Muslim Minorities in The West, Grey Seal, London, 1995 (edited with S. Z. Abedin)
  - How We Know: Ilm and the Revival of Knowledge, Grey Seal, London, 1991
  - An Early Crescent: The Future of Knowledge and Environment in Islam, Mansell, London, 1989
  - The Revenge of Athena: Science, Exploitation and the Third World, Mansell, London, 1988
  - Science and Technology in the Middle East: A Guide to Issues, Organisations and Institutions, Longman, Harlow, 1982
  - The Touch of Midas: Science, Values and the Environment in Islam and the West, Manchester University Press, Manchester, 1982
  - Information and the Muslim World: A Strategy for the Twenty-first Century, Islamic Futures and Policy Studies, Mansell Publishing Limited, London and New York 1988
  - Shaping Information Systems of the Islamic World, Mansell, London, in 1988
  - Islamic Futures: The Shape of Ideas to Come, Mansell, London, 1986
  - The Future of Muslim Civilisation, Mansell, London, 1979
  - Hajj Studies, Crown Helm, London, 1979
  - Islam: Outline of a classification scheme, Clive Bingley, London, 1979
  - Muhammad: Aspects of a Biography, Islamic Foundation, Leicester, 1978
  - Science, Technology and Development in the Muslim World, Croom Helm, London; Humanities Press, New Jersey; 1977
  - Sardar has also contributed a number of books to the Introducing... series published by Icon Books, including Introducing Islam, Introducing Chaos, Introducing Cultural Studies, Introducing Media Studies, Introducing Mathematics and Introducing Postmodernism.

=== With Merryl Wyn Davies ===
- Will America Change? Icon Books, Cambridge, 2008
- American Dream, Global Nightmare, Icon Books, Cambridge, 2004
- The No Nonsense Guide to Islam, Verso, London, 2004
- Why Do People Hate America?, Icon Books, London, 2003
- Barbaric Others: A Manifesto on Western Racism, Pluto Press, London, 1993 (also with Ashis Nandy)
- Distorted Imagination: Lessons from the Rushdie Affair, Grey Seal/Berita Publishing, London/Kuala Lumpur, 1990
- Faces of Islam: Conversations on Contemporary Issues, Barita Books, Kuala Lumpur, 1989

== Selected journalism and essays ==
- Ziauddin Sardar, 'What do we mean by Islamic Futures?' in Ibrahim M Abu-Rabi, editor, The Blackwell Companion to Contemporary Islamic Thought, Blackwell, Oxford, 2006, 5562–586.
- Ziauddin Sardar, 'The problem of futures studies', in Ziauddin Sardar, editor, Rescuing All Our Futures: The Future of Future Studies, Adamantine Press, London; Praeger Publishers, Westport, CT; 1998, pages 9–18
- Ziauddin Sardar, 'Listening to Islam', in Listening to Islam: Praise, Reason and Reflection, ed. John Watson (Brighton: Sussex Academic Press, 2005).
- Ziauddin Sardar, New Statesman 11 December 2006, "Welcome to Planet Blitcon"
- Ziauddin Sardar, New Statesman, 18 July 2005, "The struggle for Islam's soul"
- Ziauddin Sardar, New Statesman, 14 June 2004, 'Is Muslim civilisation set on a fixed course to decline?' Wahhabism, the Saudis' brand of Islam, negates the very idea of evolution in human thought and morality
- Ziauddin Sardar, New Statesman, 9 August 2004, Lost in translation: most English-language editions of the Qur'an have contained numerous errors, omissions and distortions. Hardly surprising, writes Ziauddin Sardar, when one of their purposes was to denigrate not just the Holy Book, but the entire Islamic faith
- Ziauddin Sardar, June 2002, "Rethinking Islam"
- Ziauddin Sardar, "Medicine and Multiculturalism", New Renaissance, Vol. 11, No. 2, issue 37, Summer 2002
- Audio of Ziauddin Sardar's lecture "Islam and Modernity: The Problem with Paradise" delivered at the Walter Chapin Simpson Center for the Humanities on 5 May 2005.
- Ziauddin Sardar, The Royal Society,"Islam and science: lecture transcript"
- 'Same again ...' The Ideas Book edited by Linda Carroli, University of Queensland Press, Brisbane, 2005.
- 'Foreword', Black Skin, White Masks by Frantz Fanon, Pluto Press, London
- The Erasure of Islam' tpm: The Philosopher's Magazine Issue 42 Third Quarter 2008 77–79
- ‘Touched by Wonder: Art and Religion in the 21st Century’ in Touched edited by Paul Domela, Liverpool Biennial, Liverpool, and Editore Silvana, Milan, 2011.
- ‘Transmodern Journeys: Futures Studies and Higher Education’ in Adrian Curaj et al., editors, European Higher Education at the Crossroads, Volume 2: Governance, Financing, Mission Diversification and Futures of Higher Education, Heidelberg: Springer, pp1038–1055
- ‘The Future of the Arab Spring in Postnormal Times’ American Journal of Islamic Social Sciences 30 (4) 125-136 Fall
- ‘Islam: Introduction’ in Emma Mason, editor, Reading the Abrahamic Faiths: Rethinking Religion and Literature, Bloomsbury Academic, London, 2015, pp171–181
