= International Conference on Hollywoodism =

Iranian cultural conference series

The International Conference on Hollywoodism, sometimes known as the Conference on Hollywoodism and Cinema, is a conference held on several occasions in the early 2010s and organized by the government of Iran. By its own description, it "host[s] filmmakers, scholars and activists from around the world to discuss different aspects of world cinema as they relate to human ideals on one hand and the realities of Hollywood on the other." In particular, the conference served to criticize the United States film industry's portrayals of Islam and Iran. It took place in Tehran in February each year, coincident to and within the framework of the Fajr International Film Festival.

Attendees to the conferences included Iranian analysts as well as overseas participants. The conference put out a call for papers, with monetary prizes to be awarded to the top articles selected. Guests were given copies of up to 20 films to watch as part of their attendance. The organizers sometimes funded the travel expenses of those coming from abroad.

== History ==
=== 2011 and 2012 conferences ===
The inaugural conference was a two-day seminar held in 2011. It covered topics such as "Terrorism and Hollywood" and "Hollywood and Satanism".

The 2012 conference brought 48 international guests, who engaged in discussion on "Hollywood and Holocaust", "Palestine on the Line of Fire", and "Darwinism and Liberalism". President of Iran Mahmoud Ahmadinejad opened the conference, honoring actor and attendee Sean Stone, a recent Muslim convert and the son of the filmmaker Oliver Stone. Other attendees included Webster Tarpley, an American conspiracy theorist. The Tehran Times reported that several speakers touched upon a purported "influence of the Zionist regime on Hollywood." At the 2012 conference, Robert Faurisson delivered a paper on "Hollywoodism's part in creating the myth of 'the Holocaust'". In his opinion, Iran should use of the "poor man's atomic bomb", Holocaust revisionism (the term preferred by Holocaust deniers themselves), as means of opposing detractors.

=== 2013 conference ===
The 2013 conference was held under the auspices of the Iranian government in Tehran from 2 February with about 130 international participants for four days of sessions Hamed Ghashghavi was the Secretary on International Affairs of the conference. The guests included Mark Weber of the Institute for Historical Review, Isabelle Coutant-Peyre (the wife of Carlos the Jackal); Abdul Alim Musa; Art Olivier, a former Libertarian Mayor of Bellflower, California, and the French comedian Dieudonné. The eventual American defector to Iran, Monica Witt (who also attended in 2012), was not invited but was permitted to speak, according to an organiser. The event's website identified 'partners' who included 9/11 conspiracists/Holocaust deniers Kevin Barrett (via his Truth Jihad website) and Jim Fetzer, as well as Americana Pictures, a production company owned by Merlin Miller, a member of the white supremacist American Freedom Party and the Council for the National Interest (CNI) whose leader is Alison Weir. The Anti-Defamation League (ADL) said the logo for the conference combined the Star of David with masonic imagery.

The conference has been held at the Parsian Azadi Hotel. It was opened by Javad Shamaqdari, Iran Cinema Organization Director and deputy cultural minister for cinema affairs,. Iranian Minister of Culture and Islamic Guidance Mohammad Hosseini was also present. In his speech he expressed a belief that Hollywood is governed by a "hidden management that is leading the economic, business, researching and theorizing centers", although he also claimed the "White House’s leaders play a main role in the artistic policy for Hollywood."

Conference discussion paid special attention to the effects upon American public opinion of the U.S. film Argo (2012), a narratively fictionalised rendition of aspects of the 1979–1981 Iran hostage crisis that had been nominated for several Academy Awards. Also screened and discussed were the films Unthinkable (2010) and Jerusalem Countdown (2011), among others. While many attendees held the notion that U.S. films served to promote a secret agenda they called "Hollywoodism", they often differed in their approaches.

Among the 2013 attendees was former U.S. Senator and presidential candidate Mike Gravel, who had previously been a frequent interviewee of Iran's state-sponsored PressTV. Gravel said that the U.S. film industry had brainwashed the American public regarding what to think of Iran. He also said the conference featured "various elements of extremes", some of whose attitudes against Israel and Zionism were "off the charts". Another attendee was Iranian political strategist Hassan Abbasi, who is known for Zionist conspiracy theories involving the cartoon characters Tom and Jerry and who said of watching American films, "The images you see pollute your sexual fantasies." E. Michael Jones, editor of an American conservative Christian magazine, said he was impressed by how the host country had desexualised their culture: "There was a reason Iranians burned their cinemas during the revolution." Abdul Alim Musa, said Islamic peoples were being subjected to a "cultural invasion" by Western film.
