= Vijay Viswanathan =

Indian diabetologist

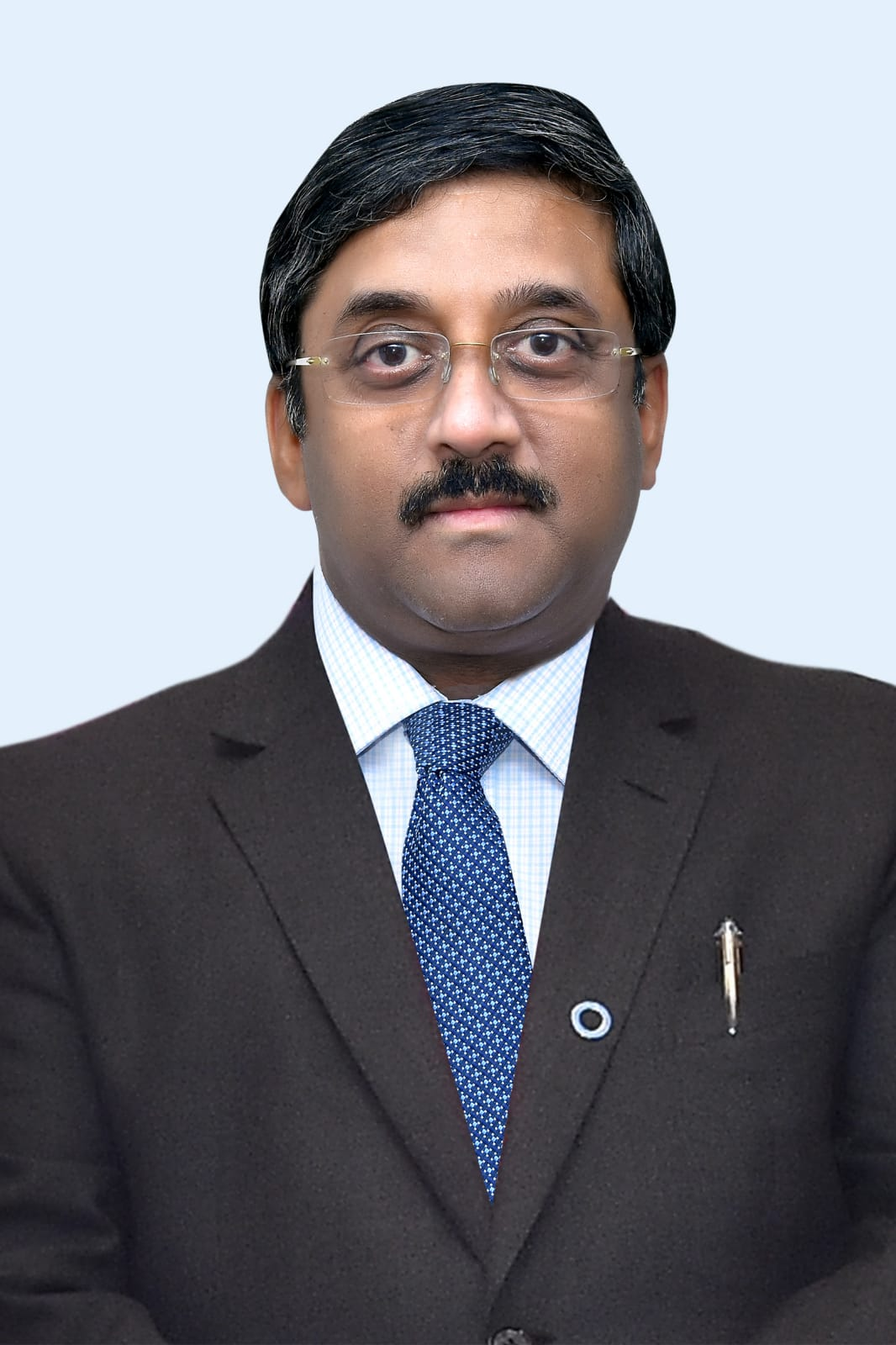
- Born: Chennai, Tamil Nadu, India
- Education: Bachelor of Medicine, Bachelor of Surgery (MBBS); Doctor of Medicine in Internal Medicine (MD); Doctor of Philosophy in diabetic nephropathy (Ph.D.)
- Alma mater: University of Mangalore; Stanley Medical College; The Tamil Nadu Dr. M.G.R. Medical University; Royal College of Physicians
- Occupation: Diabetologist
- Board member of: European Association for the Study of Diabetes (EASD) (Member) European Diabetic Nephropathy Study Group (EDNSG) (Member) Diabetic Foot Study Group (DFSG) (Founding Member) European Association for the Study of Diabetes (EASD) (Member)

Vijay Viswanathan is a diabetologist from India who is the chief diabetologist at M.V. Hospital for Diabetes based in Chennai. He is also the President of Prof. M. Viswanathan Diabetes Research Centre and the first Asian President of D-Foot International, a non-profit organization based in Belgium. Viswanathan has published over 543 research papers, in publications including the National Library of Medicine, on topics such as primary prevention and management of diabetes, diabetic foot and prevention of amputation, diabetic nephropathy, socio-economics of diabetes care and Pulmonary TB and diabetes.

He has been awarded the Medical Council Award from the Governor of Tamil Nadu at the Tamil Nadu Medical Council in Chennai.

== Education and career ==
In 1987, Viswanathan completed his MBBS degree from Govt. Stanley Medical College. He later went on to pursue his MD in Internal Medicine at the Kasturba Medical College, Mangalore, which he completed in 1991. In 1999, Viswanathan earned his Ph.D. in Diabetic Nephropathy from The Tamil Nadu Dr. M.G.R. Medical University (TNMGRMU). Additionally, he has advanced post-graduate training in diabetes. In 2010, Viswanathan completed his FRCP from the Royal College of Physicians in London. He serves as the President of Prof. M. Viswanathan Diabetes Research Centre, a WHO Collaborating centre for Research, Education and Training, and a Scientific & Industrial Research Organization (SIRO) recognized by the Department of Scientific and Industrial Research (Govt. of India). In 2019, he was the National Vice President of the Research Society for the Study of Diabetes (RSSDI).

Viswanathan is a member of the European Association for the Study of Diabetes (EASD), the European Association for Study of Diabetes (EASD) as well as the European Diabetic Nephropathy Study Group (EDNSG). Additionally, he is a founding member of the Diabetic Foot Study Group (DFSG).

Viswanathan was involved in drafting guidelines for wound healing and offloading as part of The International Working Group on the Diabetic Foot (IWGDF) will release these guidelines next year, which are updated every four years. Viswanathan has previously drafted infection guidelines in 2015 and recommendations for footwear for diabetic foot ulcers in 2019. He will be part of the wound healing and offloading working groups for the 2023 update.

Viswanathan currently serves as national president of the Research Society for the Study of Diabetes in India (RSSDI). On 30 March 2024, MV Hospital for Diabetes and the Prof. M. Viswanathan Diabetes Research Centre, Royapuram, conducted the 38th Prof. M. Viswanathan DRC Gold Medal Oration in Chennai. During the event, the hospital launched a 'Wound Clinic Training Program' designed to educate healthcare professionals on preventing complications associated with diabetic foot infections. In October 2024, MV Hospital for Diabetes, in collaboration with the Academy of Physicians in Wound Healing (United States), established a School of Podiatry under the name Diabetic Foot Research India, aimed at providing training in podiatric care for medical and paramedical professionals.

== Selected publications ==
- Viswanathan, V.; Mirshad, R. (2023), "Role of Technology for wound Care in Diabetic Foot", Chronic Wound Management, Cham: Springer International Publishing, pp. 67–76, doi:10.1007/978-3-031-26110-7_4, ISBN 978-3-031-26109-1
- Viswanathan, Vijay; Ahmed Khan, Balkhiwala; Nachimuthu, Sukanya; Kumpatla, Satyavani (2023). "Precision of Michigan Neuropathy Screening Instrument (MNSI) Tool for the Diagnosis of Diabetic Peripheral Neuropathy Among People with Type 2 Diabetes—A Study from South India". The International Journal of Lower Extremity Wounds. doi:10.1177/15347346231163209. ISSN 1534-7346.
- "Current and future perspective in the management of diabetes".
- "Type 2 Diabetes Mellitus – The Epidemic Of The 21st Century: The Indian Scenario A Ramachandran, C Snehalatha*, Int. J. Diab. Dev. Countries (1999), Vol. 19".
- High Prevalence of Obstructive Sleep Apnea among People with Type 2 Diabetes Mellitus in a Tertiary Care Center. J Assoc Physicians India. 2017 Nov;65(11):38-42. PMID 29322708.
- Need for education on footcare in diabetic patients in India. J Assoc Physicians India. 1999 Nov;47(11):1083-5. PMID 10862318.
- Diabetic nephropathy in type 2 diabetes: the Indian experience. J Assoc Physicians India. 2001 Dec;49:1185-7. PMID 11996441.
- Prevalence of pathogens in diabetic foot infection in South Indian type 2 diabetic patients. J Assoc Physicians India. 2002 Aug;50:1013-6. PMID 12421021.
- Is increased apolipoprotein B-A major factor enhancing the risk of coronary artery disease in type 2 diabetes? J Assoc Physicians India. 2002 Aug;50:1036-8. PMID 12421026.
- Plasma homocysteine concentration and coronary artery disease in Asian Indians. J Assoc Physicians India. 2002 Oct;50:1229-31. PMID 12568203.

== Awards ==
- 2005 Hoechst Senior Lecturership in Diabetes by Diamond APICON
- 2009 Professor P.J. Mehta Oration Award by Association of Physicians of India
- 2011: Received the Professor Sam G.P. Moses Oration from Research Society for the Study of Diabetes (RSSDI)
- 2013 Vivian Foncseca Scholar Award from the American Diabetes Association for his research on the link between Diabetes and TB.
- 2014 Professor Sam. G. P. Moses Oration and Gold Medal Oration from Research Society for the Study of Diabetes (RSSDI)
- 2014 Dr. B Ramamurthy Endowment Lecture Award, Indian Medical Association Branch
- 2015 Gold Medal Oration by Research Society for the Study of Diabetes (RSSDI)
- 2015 Medical Council Award by Governor of Tamil Nadu at Tamil Nadu Medical Council, Chennai
- 2017 Fellowship Award by Research Society for the Study of Diabetes (RSSDI)
- 2018 Inspiring Diabetologist of India from Anupriya Patel, Minister of State- Health and Family Welfare Govt of India
- 2018 Excellence in Diabetic Foot Award from the National Diabetic Foot Conclave
- 2019 Outstanding Investigator Award from the World-India Diabetes Foundation, a US-based organization in 2019.
- 2022 Second prize at the 18th European Diabetic Foot Study Group (DFSG) meeting in Bratislava, Slovakia for his research paper submitted on “Improving blood flow and saving the legs of people with Diabetes”
