= Marzieh Hashemi =

American-Iranian television presenter (born 1959)

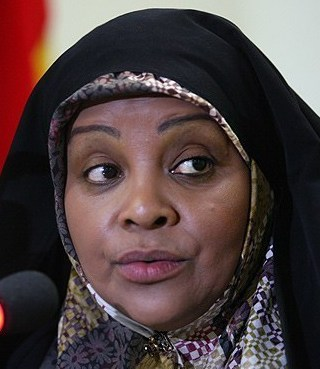
- Born: Melanie Franklin; December 21, 1959 (age 66); New Orleans, Louisiana, U.S.
- Citizenship: United States; Iran
- Occupation: Journalist
- Known for: Press TV host

Marzieh Hashemi (Persian: مرضیه هاشمی; born as Melanie Franklin) is an American-born Iranian journalist and television presenter. She is a natural-born citizen of the United States and a naturalized citizen of Iran. Hashemi is employed by Press TV, the Iranian state-owned news and documentary television network.

On January 15, 2019, Hashemi was arrested by the FBI while boarding a St. Louis flight, to visit her children in Denver. According to court documents she was being held as a material witness in a federal investigation and had not been accused of any crime. Hashemi was released on 23 January 2019 after testifying before a federal grand jury in Washington D.C.

== Biography ==
Hashemi was born on 21 November 1959 in New Orleans, Louisiana. She was born into a Christian African-American family. She was a student in the field of broadcasting in 1979, when the Iranian revolution happened. As a result of this, she converted to Islam and began her career in Islamic newspapers and magazines in United States.

Since 2008, she has lived in Iran, where she is now a TV presenter, journalist, voice-over artist, documentarian and the host of Press TV, Iran's English-language broadcasting network.

She has said the main reason for her conversion was the Iranian revolution and the character of Ayatollah Khomeini.

When I was a student in America I witnessed that the Iranian students are so active and I was so interested in political activities then, I used to ask them about their activities and purposes, why you protest? And they used to talk about the cruelty of the overset king [sic] and Imam Khomeini to me, and this was the first step of me becoming Muslim. I was looking for the truth and I wasn't satisfied with my own religion, and I had no solution for the problem that the God has three parts of the Father, and the Son, and the holy Spirit, But [sic] still were one? I wasn't convinced with answers when I asked from different people, when this issue happened to be in university, I started to study not only about Islam but about different religions, and simultaneously comparing them in theory and ideology, from Marx [sic] Weber up to now, and thanks God, after I became Muslim.

She changed her name to Marzieh Hashemi after conversion; Hashemi is her Muslim husband’s last name and she chose Marzieh, a title of Fatimah bint Muhammad, the daughter of the Islamic prophet Muhammad. Hashemi was granted Iranian citizenship because her husband is Iranian.

Hashemi has been accused of antisemitism. She has stated that Jews control American media and that Zionists were behind the September 11 attacks.

== Arrest in the United States (2019) ==
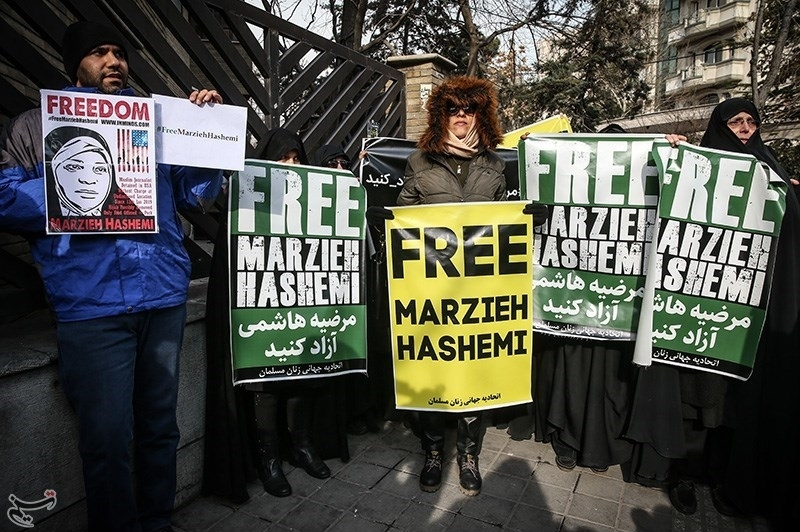
Tehran rally (2019), to demand the release of Iran’s Press TV news anchor Marzieh Hashemi

On 13 January 2019, Hashemi travelled to the United States to visit her family, particularly her ill brother. CNN reported she was traveling to visit her family and film a documentary about Black Lives Matter for Press TV.

Hashemi was arrested at the St. Louis Lambert International Airport in Missouri by federal agents and was being held in custody in Washington DC. The reason for her arrest was initially unknown, but according to subsequent court documents she was being held as a material witness for a federal investigation but "has not been accused of any crime". According to Reuters, a United States government source told them that a grand jury was examining whether Press TV failed to register as a foreign agent which would be required if it is a propaganda outlet. Following testimony before a federal grand jury in Washington D.C., Hashemi was released on 23 January 2019, and returned to Iran on 30 January 2019.

Iranian media said Hashemi was denied permission to call her family for 48 hours. Press TV said Hashemi was denied halal food, offered only pork to eat, and she had only eaten a packet of crackers since her detainment. Hashemi said that her hijab was forcibly removed and that she is only able to wear a short-sleeved shirt, also contrary to the requirements of her Muslim faith. Hashemi had criticized US discrimination against veiled Muslim women in the past.

According to Adam Goldman of The New York Times, Hashemi is the "Individual A" cited in the unsealed indictment of Monica Witt, who is charged with espionage for Iran.

=== Reaction ===
- Foreign Minister Mohammad Javad Zarif described the arrest of Marzieh Hashemi by America as a "political game". He said that her arrest was an unacceptable political act that trampled on freedom of speech.
- Peyman Jebelli, the head of Islamic Republic of Iran Broadcasting (IRIB)’s World Service, described the action a "blunder" and criticized her ill-treatment in US custody.
- The Islamic Human Rights Commission (IHRC) wrote to the UN Rapporteur on Arbitrary Detention with regard to Ms. Hashemi's imprisonment. IHRC condemned the journalist's arrest and "called for the widest media solidarity campaign" to help secure her release.
