= Die Nigger Die! =

1969 book by H. Rap Brown

- Author: H. Rap Brown
- Language: English
- Genre: Autobiography
- Publisher: Dial Press
- Publication date: 1969
- Publication place: United States
- Media type: Print (hardcover, paperback)
- Pages: 145 (first edition, hardback)
- ISBN: 978-1-55652-452-3 (reprint edition, hardback)

Die Nigger Die! is a 1969 political autobiography by the American political activist H. Rap Brown (later known as Jamil Abdullah al-Amin). The book was first released in the United States in 1969 (by Dial Press) and then in the United Kingdom in 1970 (by Allison & Busby). Brown describes his experiences as a young black civil rights activist and how they shaped his opinions of white America.

He expresses his opinions on what he believes Black Americans need to do to break free from white oppression. As a chairman of the Student Nonviolent Coordinating Committee and from 1968 a member of the Black Panther Party, he was heavily involved with organizations that espoused a Black Power ideology.

After the subsequent conviction of Brown for murder in March 2002, the book was reprinted by Lawrence Hill Press with a foreword by Ekwueme Michael Thelwell.
