= Aleem Khan (disambiguation) =

Aleem Khan (born 1970) is a Pakistani politician and businessman.

Aleem Khan may also refer to:

- Aleem Khan (director) (born 1985), British film director

== See also ==
- Abdul Aleem Khanzada, Pakistani educationist and politician
- Aleemullah Khan Falaki (born 1956), Indian activist
