= M. M. S. Ahuja =

Indian physician and endocrinologist

Man Mohan Singh Ahuja
- Born: 1929; Multan, Punjab, British India
- Died: 12 July 1998; New Delhi, India
- Citizenship: India
- Education: Madras Medical College
- Awards: B. C. Roy Award; Padma Shri
- Scientific career
- Fields: Endocrinology
- Workplaces: All India Institute of Medical Sciences

Man Mohan Singh Ahuja (1929 – 12 July 1998) was an Indian physician and endocrinologist.

He was born in 1929 in Multan in British India. He graduated from Madras Medical College in 1952. He passed M.R.C.P. (London) in 1956, and did residency at Hammersmith Hospital, London. In 1958, he joined All India Institute of Medical Sciences as Registrar in Medicine department under Prof. K. L. Wig. He was promoted as Associate Professor and later as Head of the Department of Medicine in 1969. He became Head of the Department of Endocrinology and Metabolism, when it was formed in 1982 until 1989. He was Dean of the Institute in 1988–1989.

He played a key role in founding 'Research Society for the Study of Diabetes in India' in 1972 and 'Hormone Foundation, India.' He was the founding editor of International Journal of Diabetes in Developing Countries.

He was chief editor of a medical publication series on "Progress in Clinical Medicine in India".

== Death ==
Man Mohan Singh Ahuja died on 12 July 1998 in New Delhi.

== Awards ==
- B. C. Roy Award for Medical Research in 1982.
- Government of India awarded Padma Shri in 1991.
