= Abdul Alim Musa =

Muslim American activist (1945–2022)

- Born: Clarence Reams; February 6, 1945; Arkansas, United States
- Died: November 25, 2022 (aged 77); Washington, D.C.
- Occupations: Muslim activist and public speaker
- Website: www.sabiqun.org

Imam Abdul Alim Musa (February 6, 1945-November 25, 2022 ) as Clarence Reams was a Muslim American activist. He died of natural causes on November 25, 2022. Musa was the founder and director of As-Sabiqun, and the Islamic Institute of Counter-Zionist American Psychological Warfare, which has been classified as a hate group by the Anti-Defamation League.

== Background ==
Abdul Alim was born in Arkansas in 1945, but lived in Oakland, California during the 1960s. It was during this period that he associated with H. Rap Brown (Imam Jamil Al-Amin), who later converted to Islam.

Having set up a drug dealing operation in Colombia, Musa was arrested on charges including heroin smuggling, currency smuggling and assaulting a federal agent. After evading the authorities for several years, Musa fled to Algeria, where he came in contact with several self-exiled Black Panther leaders such as Eldridge Cleaver. After returning to the U.S., he turned himself in and was eventually incarcerated at the United States Penitentiary, Leavenworth.

While in prison, Musa converted to orthodox Sunni Islam. Musa supported the Iranian Revolution, believing that it would lead to the revival of Islam.

== Travel to Iran ==
Following the 1979 Iranian Revolution, Musa publicly expressed his support for the Islamic republic and its leader, Ayatollah Khomeini. Since the early 1980s, he has made several visits to Iran as a representative of American Muslims. In February 2013, Musa attended the International Conference on Hollywoodism and spoke negatively about the portrayal of Muslims portrait in United States films.

Musa made connections with Muslim leaders during the decade – both Sunni and Shia – and stressed that unity was a primary objective for the Islamic movements success. He references the writings of Malcolm X, Ayatollah Khomeini, Sayyid Qutb, Maulana Maududi, and Kalim Siddiqui. New members of the group are encouraged to individually familiarize themselves with the works of these political Islamic thinkers in addition to daily classes and lectures on classical Islamic studies, Arabic, hadith and Quran.

== Allegations of Antisemitism ==
According to the Anti-Defamation League, Musa "propagates a radical and anti-Semitic ideology." He said in May 2007: "Who ran the slave trade ... who funded [it]? You'll study and you will find out: the Jews ... It was the Jewish bankers ... in Vienna, with pockets full of money, funding and insuring, that's who did it ... you can't tell us about no holocaust. Between the African Americans and the Native Americans, everybody else's stuff was small potatoes."

According to Benjamin Ginsberg, student groups the Associated Students of the University of Washington and the Black Students Commission allegedly sponsored "a vehemently anti-semitic" speech by Musa, in which he asserted that America was controlled by Jews, and that "Yahuds are the enemy of humanity."

Critics have suggested that he promotes antisemitism in his speeches. In June 2000, he said of Jamil al-Amin, later falsely convicted for murder of an Atlanta deputy sheriff: "Al-Amin ... turned his ideas, his belief in Islam, into practical solutions for society. And they can't stand that. Just like our brother said: the Zionists are the same today as they was then. In those days [in pre-Islamic Arabia] they controlled the liquor market in Madinah...and the Zionists kept the Arab leaders broke and drunk ... the yahud [Arabic word for Jew] were sitting back and had each one of them [Arab clans] fighting each other because the leaders was both drunken and they was all in owe [sic] to the same Yahud...he was manipulating the Arabs...then Islam came [and abolished Riba, or interest]."

== Since 2000 ==
Musa said that "I would love to have a case in court with the FBI. I would love for them to arrest me on any trumped-up charges." Musa later commented that "I tried to get a case several years ago. We had a demonstration. I waved a check for Hamas, cashier's check, by the way. And I said, 'I'm donating this to Hamas.' Then I waited for them to arrest me. They didn't arrest me. So I put the thing back in the bank."

At the January 21, 2001 event titled Shaping Our Perspective: Our Role in a Changing World, sponsored by the Muslim Students Association at UCLA, Musa is quoted as stating: "If you were to say that the Soviet Union was wiped off the face of the Earth . . . people would have thought you were crazy, right? The people of Afghanistan didn't have the intellect or historical knowledge to know that they wasn't supposed to wipe out the Soviet Union, is that right? . . . We saw the fall of one so-called superpower, Old Sam (the United States) is next."

On October 6, 2002, he spoke on Muhammad's model of leadership and its modern applications at the ICIT Seerah Conference in Sri Lanka. On July 7, 2000 Musa, while in the company of his wife and daughter, witnessed the Metropolitan Police Department in Washington DC beating a citizen. He attempted to intervene by approaching the officers and telling them to stop. They continued until Musa grabbed one of the officers and was consequently arrested for assaulting the police. He spent two nights in jail before appearing before a judge on July 10. In court, the police reduced the charge against him to a misdemeanor.

Musa has made a number of controversial statements:

- Zionist American agents blew up the World Trade Center
- Palestinian suicide bombers are heroes
- The U.S. government saturated U.S. cities with heroin in the 1960s to snuff out black rebellion
- The United States should become an Islamic state

Musa has stated that "The American ship is going down, and it's clowns like that [President George W. Bush] that's driving it down. We don't have to do nothing. Just step back, pray, fast, do good deeds, and stuff like that. And let that guy go. . . . When he finishes, nobody will love, nobody will trust, and nobody will believe anything coming from the United States of America."

In January 2010, during a debate with George Mason University professor Jack Goldstone on Iranian Press TV, Musa said "they (Americans) set up the Mexicans..." and that "The American history is a history of robbing and stealing, and setting up people in order to get what they want."

== Banning from the United Kingdom ==
In April 2009, Musa's name was released to the press as one of 22 people banned from entering the United Kingdom in October 2008. The Home Office said this was due to his being "Considered to be engaging in unacceptable behavior by fomenting and glorifying terrorist violence in furtherance of his particular beliefs and seeking to provoke others to terrorist acts."

== Islamic Institute of Counter-Zionist American Psychological Warfare ==
In 2011, Musa founded the Islamic Institute of Counter-Zionist American Psychological Warfare, distributing flyers that say "For 30 years, Masjid Al-Islam [Sabiqun's mosque] has been carrying on a direct, face-to-face struggle against the monolithic Zionist American regime... We are an anti-Zionist American psycho-guerrilla warfare movement. We use all available tools found in our environment in exposing the anti-Islamic, anti-human policies of this Zionist American system." The mission is "to counter the concerted efforts of the enemies of Islam to sustain a false characterization of Islam and Muslims as a dangerous threat to global stability and tranquility."

The institute was established to "monitor Zionist and Israeli networks, circles, and clubs which deceitfully infiltrate Muslim and Black groups," according to a June 2010 Sabiqun newsletter. In a January 2011 statement announcing the opening of the Oakland branch, Sabiqun also declared that one of the institute's goals is to "Analyze the Zionist grip on humanity established via the media and economics."
