= Muslim Parliament of Great Britain =

The Muslim Parliament of Great Britain was a Muslim organisation founded in 1992 in London by Kalim Siddiqui, Director of the Muslim Institute, based on a proposal published in July 1990 under the title The Muslim Manifesto. The Muslim Parliament consisted of 155 members, including women and young people, and worked through specialist committees. Its proposals attracted public attention and some have been copied by other Muslim groups. Following Kalim Siddiqui's passing in 1996, the Muslim Parliament's leadership passed to Siddiqui's right-hand man, Dr Ghayasuddin Siddiqui (no relation).

== Muslim Manifesto ==
The ideas in The Muslim Manifesto: A Strategy for Survival launched the Muslim Parliament. Authored primarily by Kalim Siddiqui, the Manifesto declared:

"It is a matter of deep regret that the Government, all political parties and the mass media in Britain are now engaged in a relentless campaign to reduce Muslim citizens of this country to the status of a disparaged and oppressed minority. We have no alternative but to resist this insidious campaign."

The Muslim Manifesto made it clear that "Political and cultural subservience goes against their grain" because "at its inception Islam created a political platform from which Muslims were to launch themselves on a global role as founders of great states, empires and a world civilization and culture."

The Muslim Manifesto proposes setting up a "Council of Muslim Women in Britain", stating that "It is for Muslim women themselves to develop an Islamic lifestyle in the context of the needs of the Muslim community in Britain. It is also for Muslim women to play a major part in the public life of the Muslim community in Britain... The fact is that a Muslim woman cannot be a western woman... Muslim women have a higher and nobler place in society than the so-called "emancipated" women in the west".

The Manifesto establishes a six-point "Relationship with the British authorities":

- Islam allows Muslims to accept protection of life, property, and liberty from non-Muslim rulers and their political systems. Muslims placed in this situation may also pay taxes and other dues to a non-Muslim State.
- Muslims living under the protection of a non-Muslim State must obey the laws of that State, so long as such obedience does not conflict with their commitment to Islam and the Ummah. Other minorities in Britain, notably Jews and Roman Catholics, do the same.
- There are laws on the British Statute Book that are in direct conflict with the laws of Allah; these relate to such matters as usury, abortion, homosexuality, gambling, sale and consumption of alcohol, and the abolition of capital punishment.
- Muslims will co-operate with the appropriate authorities for the maintenance of law and order and the promotion of peaceful and wholesome conditions for all our fellow citizens.
- Muslims will insist, and continue to insist for as long as it may be necessary, that the British State provide them, their religion and culture protection from gratuitous insult, obscenity and abuse.
- Muslims make it clear to the State, and to all sections of British society, that they do not expect to be and will not tolerate being insulted and abused on grounds of their religion, culture and traditions.

== The Muslim Parliament today ==
The Muslim Parliament today no longer exists in its original form.
