= Capstone course =

Culminating collegiate/university educational program

A capstone course, also known as a synthesis and capstone project or senior synthesis, is a project that serves as the culminating and usually integrative praxis experience of an educational program mostly found in American-style pedagogy. In the Commonwealth of Nations, Bologna Process, and in other parts of the world influenced by their education systems, a senior thesis (thesis) is usually a culmination of an educational program but is much more theoretical and academia-oriented.

== Nature and structure ==
A capstone course is usually designed as a hands-on project, an extended essay, a research paper, or another form of applied work. This work is often submitted as a requirement for a degree or professional qualification and is typically written in a professional writing format rather than the more traditional academic writing style. The goal is to present findings from the perspective of a professional in the field, rather than that of a student or academic researcher.

== Capstone awards and recognition ==
Some universities and colleges award a Capstone Award or Capstone Prize based on merit in the capstone course.

== Etymology and historical development ==
The term derives from the final decorative coping or "cap-stone" used to complete a building or monument. In higher education, the term has been in common use in the United States since the mid-twentieth century, although there is evidence that it was in use as early as the late 1800s. It has gradually been gaining currency in other countries, particularly where attention has focused on student outcomes and employability in undergraduate studies. National grant projects in Australia and the U.K. have further raised the profile of the capstone experience.

== See also ==
- Major (academic)
- Seminar
- Thesis
