= Merryl Wyn Davies =

Welsh Muslim scholar (1949–2021)

Merryl Wyn Davies (23 June 1949 – 1 February 2021) was a Welsh Muslim scholar, writer and broadcaster. She specialised in Islam, and was the co-author of books and articles with Ziauddin Sardar. An exponent of Islamic anthropology, she was director of the Muslim Institute in London.

== Biography ==
Merryl Wyn Davies was born on 23 June 1949, in Merthyr Tydfil, Wales. She attended Cyfarthfa Grammar School for A levels. After reading anthropology at University College, London, she began a career in broadcasting and journalism. Following jobs with local Welsh newspapers, and a stint with BBC Radio, Davies spent a decade with BBC TV Religious programmes, working on such award-winning shows as ‘Everyman’, ‘Heart of the Matter’ and ‘Global Report’ and the series, Encounters with Islam.

She converted to Islam in 1981, at the age of 31. In 1985, she left the BBC to write independently and to work for the London-based Muslim magazine Inquiry. During the 1990s, she worked as advisor and speech writer for Anwar Ibrahim, a former Deputy Prime Minister of Malaysia and later the Leader of the Opposition; and produced the ‘Faces of Islam’ series for TV3 Malaysia. When Ibrahim was arrested, Wyn Davies fled, and moved to Singapore. She returned to the UK in 1996 and became Media Officer for the Muslim Council of Britain. In 2010, she joined the Muslim Institute of London to become its director.

== Thought ==
Davies pioneered a new approach to Islamic anthropology and a highly original critique of America based on Hollywood films. In her work, Knowing One Another: Shaping an Islamic Anthropology, Davies developed a new mode of inquiry which she described, "after ibn Khaldun, as ilm ul umran": a radical discourse shaped by dialogue between civilisations and cultures and based on an holistic understanding of what it means to be human.

In three books about the United States, co-written with Ziauddin Sardar, Davies developed "laws of American mythology" ("Fear is essential"; "Escape is the reason for being", "America is the idea of nation", "American democracy has the right to be imperial and express itself through empire", "cinema is the engine of empire", etc.) which, Davies argued, are essential to understanding the psychology of the United States.

== Death ==
Having returned to her "adopted country" of Malaysia in 2018, Merryl Wyn Davies died on 1 February 2021, aged 71, in Petaling Jaya, Kuala Lumpur, of a heart attack following a period of ill health.

== Books ==
- Introducing Anthropology, Icon Books, Cambridge, 2002
- Darwin and fundamentalism (2000)
- Beyond Frontiers: Islam and Contemporary Needs, Mansell, London, 1989
- Knowing one another: Shaping an Islamic anthropology (1988)

=== With Ziauddin Sardar ===
- Will America Change? Icon Books, Cambridge, 2008
- American Dream, Global Nightmare, Icon Books, Cambridge, 2004
- The No Nonsense Guide to Islam, Verso, London, 2004
- Why Do People Hate America?, Icon Books, London, 2003
- Barbaric Others: A Manifesto on Western Racism, Pluto Press, London, 1993 (also with Ashis Nandy)
- Distorted Imagination: Lessons from the Rushdie Affair, Grey Seal/Berita Publishing, London/Kuala Lumpur, 1990
- Faces of Islam: Conversations on Contemporary Issues, Berita Books, Kuala Lumpur, 1989
