= Aleem Khan Falaki =

Indian social activist

- Born: Mohammed Aleemullah Khan; 15 July 1956 (age 70); Hyderabad, India
- Education: MA in Social Work; PhD in Social Work
- Alma mater: Maulana Azad National Urdu University
- Organization: Socio-Reform-Society
- Movement: Anti-Dowry Crusade
- Awards: India Fraternity Forum (IFF)

Aleem Khan (born 1956) is an Indian social activist fighting to eradicate Dowry from the Indian subcontinent hailing from Hyderabad in the Indian state of Telangana. He is also known for his Urdu poetry which he frequently recites at Mushairas. He is the founder of Socio-Reform-Society and the author of numerous books on dowry written in Urdu and English.

== Early life ==
Mohammed Aleemullah Khan alias Aleem Khan Falaki was born in Hyderabad, India in 1956 to Mohammad Khaleelullah Khan who was also a scholar and often cites him as his inspiration. He graduated from Osmania University, Hyderabad and did MA, M.Phil and completed his PhD from Maulana Azad National Urdu University on the topic "Marginalization of woman in Muslim society". He also has a diploma in marriage counseling from Leicester, UK. He ran his own company in Jeddah, Saudi Arabia for more than 3 decades and has now dedicated his full-time to Social-Work.

== Anti-dowry campaign ==
Aleem Khan calls the anti-dowry campaign as the Jihad of this era. According to him, dowry is the root of all evils, and people can get rid of hundreds of other social evils and poverty over time if they give up the dowry system.

== Socio-Reforms Society ==
Socio-Reforms-Society was formed in 1992 with the sole purpose to eradicate Dowry. The organization has expanded to recruit a number of other social workers as members. They often give Lectures, Talks in various colleges of the India on the flagitiousness of dowry, with the aim of targeting the youth, along with conducting meetings with various Lawmakers and religious clerics.

== Bibliography ==
Major books authored:

- Mard bhi bikte hain....jahez ke liye (Men too are sold for dowry)
- Life insurance and Muslims
- Ek koshish aur......
- Baat hai zamane ki (Urdu humour)
