= Abdul Aleem (professor) =

Abdul Aleem was a scholar, educationist, journalist and writer in Urdu. He was the professor of Arabic at Aligarh Muslim University, and also served as its vice-chancellor from 1968 to 1974.

== Early life and education ==
He belonged to a zamindar family. His father was a practicing lawyer in Lucknow. He excelled at studies from the very beginning, and it was only natural that he should have been drawn into the field of academics. After his studies he initially joined Jamia University and during his association with Jamia university, he wrote profusely for its organ "Jamia". His escalation as an academic was phenomenal, but hardly surprising in view of his abilities. In the early 1930s he had been to Germany and had there come into contact with Marxian thought. After his stint at Jamia, Abdul Aleem joined the Lucknow University as head of Department of Arabic. He was soon to come under the influence of the progressives. The progressives were extremely active at Lucknow, during this period. The university was a hotbed of nationalist, socialist and communist literary activities. It was no surprise that he should have got involved in these.

== Political career ==
In 1934, when Shri Jaiprakash Narian lay the foundation of the Congress Socialist Party at Pune, Abdul Aleem was with him, amongst the founders. When the first convention of the Progressive Writers was being called at Lucknow in 1936, Shri Abdul Aleem was amongst the organisers along with Sajjad Zaheer and others. In 1938, he was appointed General Secretary of this Association. He was managing director of the weekly "Hindustan" which was the precursor of the Qaumi Awaz. this publication was started by Acharya Narendra Dev and shri Rafi Ahmed Qidwai. He was also a member of the editorial board of "New Indian Literature" along with Mulk Raj Anand and Ahmad Ali. His work "Literature and Marxism" is one of the accomplished treatises of the times and of the progressive literature of the period. The writings of Abdul Aleem were causing an awakening amongst the youth, throughout the length and breadth of the entire country and his political activism was becoming more and more strident day by day. As a consequence, he was arrested and imprisoned by the British and underwent rigours of prison for a year.

== Academic career ==
After independence was won, Abdul Aleem was invited to join the Aligarh Muslim University as head of the Department of Arabic. In a short time he proved his worthiness in his assignment and was appointed as Vice Chancellor, Aligarh Muslim University in 1968. After completing his tenure here he was called upon to serve as chairman of the newly constituted "Board for Promotion of Urdu". He was called upon to travel with Zakir Hussain who was serving as the 3rd president of India. Dr. Abdul Aleem was also a linguist in his own right, besides English, Hindi, Urdu, Persian and Arabic, he also had knowledge of German, French, Russian and Chinese. He was amongst the founders of the "Indian School of International Studies".

Prof. Mumtaz Hussain wrote about him thus: "Dr. Aleem can be counted amongst those few intellectuals belonging to the sub-continent who gave a direction to the thinking of the people of the sub-continent."
