= Research Society for the Study of Diabetes in India =

Research Society for the Study of Diabetes in India (RSSDI)
- Formation: 1972
- Founder: Prof. M.M.S. Ahuja
- Fields: Diabetes care, research, and education in India
- National President: Dr. Anuj Maheshwari (2026)
- National President Elect: Dr. Sunil Gupta (2026)
- Website: https://www.rssdi.in/

Research Society for the Study of Diabetes in India (RSSDI) is a professional medical association dedicated to diabetes care, research, and education in India. Established in 1972, it is regarded as Asia's largest association of diabetes healthcare professionals, comprising physicians, researchers, academicians, and allied health professionals involved in diabetes management.

The society advances diabetes prevention and treatment through medical education, postgraduate training, research support, public awareness initiatives, and policy advocacy. RSSDI supports high-quality research through grants and multicentric studies, provides continuous medical education, and conducts nationwide programs focused on early detection and prevention of Type 2 diabetes mellitus.
