= H. Rap Brown =

American civil rights leader and convicted murderer (1943–2025)

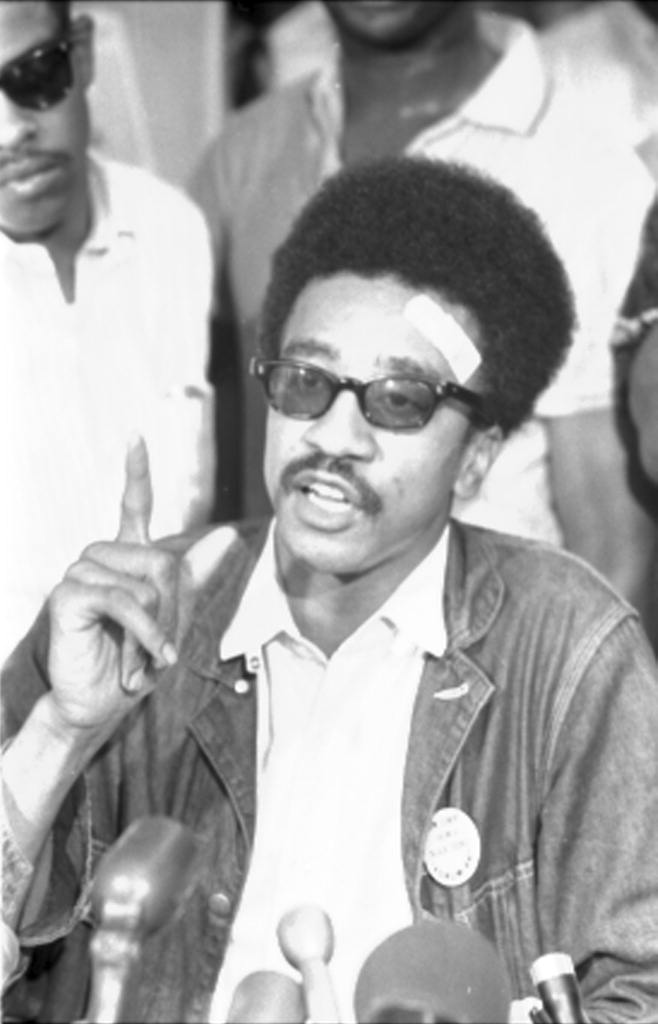
- Brown in 1967

5th Chairman of the Student Nonviolent Coordinating Committee
- In office May 1967 – June 1968
- Preceded by: Stokely Carmichael
- Succeeded by: Phil Hutchings

Personal details
- Born: Hubert Gerold Brown; October 4, 1943 Baton Rouge, Louisiana, U.S.
- Died: November 23, 2025 (aged 82) FMC Butner; Durham County, North Carolina, U.S.
- Spouse: Karima al-Amin
- Known for: Black Power movement
- Criminal information
- Convictions: Murder; aggravated assault
- Penalty: Life in prison

Details
- Imprisoned at: Georgia State Prison (2002–2007); ADX Florence (2007–2014); FMC Butner (2014–2025)

Jamil Abdullah al-Amin (born Hubert Gerold Brown; October 4, 1943 – November 23, 2025) was an American activist who served as the fifth chairman of the Student Nonviolent Coordinating Committee (SNCC) in the 1960s. Calling himself H. Rap Brown in that period, he was one of the primary spokesmen for the black power movement.

Brown was perhaps best known for his provocative comments during the ghetto riots in the "long hot summer of 1967," such as, "Violence is as American as cherry pie", and, "If America don't come around, we're gonna burn it down." He was also known for his autobiography, Die Nigger Die!. He briefly served as the Black Panther Party's minister of justice during the six month alliance between SNCC and the Black Panther Party.

After spending over a decade as a Muslim cleric and community organizer in Atlanta, Georgia, he was convicted of murder, serving a life sentence for the shooting of two Fulton County, Georgia, sheriff's deputies in 2000.

== Background and activism ==
Hubert Gerold Brown was born on October 4, 1943, as the youngest of three children. His father was a laborer and his mother was a maid and teacher. He moved to Washington, D.C. in late 1960. The same year, he enrolled at Southern University to study sociology.

Brown's activism in the civil rights movement included involvement with the Student Nonviolent Coordinating Committee (SNCC) in Mississippi. Brown was introduced into SNCC by his older brother Ed. He dropped out of Southern University in 1962 to work full-time for SNCC. He first visited Cambridge, Maryland, with Cleveland Sellers in the summer of 1963, during the period of Gloria Richardson's leadership in the local movement. He witnessed the first riot between whites and blacks in the city over civil rights issues, and was impressed by the local civil rights movement's willingness to use armed self-defense against racial attacks. Brown was nicknamed "Rap" for his wordplay skills.

He later organized for SNCC during the 1964 Mississippi Freedom Summer, while transferring to Howard University for his studies. Representing Howard's SNCC chapter, Brown attended a contentious civil rights meeting at the White House with President Lyndon B. Johnson during the Selma crisis of 1965 as Alabama activists attempted to march for voting rights.

Major federal civil rights legislation was passed in 1964 and 1965, including the Voting Rights Act of 1965, to establish federal oversight and enforcement of rights. In 1966, Brown organized in Greene County, Alabama to achieve black voter registration and implementation of the recently-passed Voting Rights Act.

Elected SNCC chairman in May 1967, Brown continued Stokely Carmichael's fiery support for "Black Power" and urban rebellions in the Northern ghettos.

During the summer of 1967, Brown toured the nation, calling for violent resistance to the government, which he called "The Fourth Reich". "Negroes should organize themselves", he told a rally in Washington, D.C., and "carry on guerilla warfare in all the cities". They should "make the Viet Cong look like Sunday school teachers". He declared, "I say to America, Fuck it! Freedom or death!"

== Cambridge riot incident ==
In this period, Cambridge, Maryland, had an active civil rights movement, led by Gloria Richardson. In July 1967 Brown spoke in the city, saying "It's time for Cambridge to explode, baby. Black folks built America, and if America don't come around, we're going to burn America down." Gunfire reportedly broke out later, and both Brown and a police officer were wounded. A fire started that night and by the next day, 17 buildings were destroyed by an expanding fire "in a two-block area of Pine Street, the center of African-American commerce, culture and community." Brown was charged with inciting a riot, due to his speech.

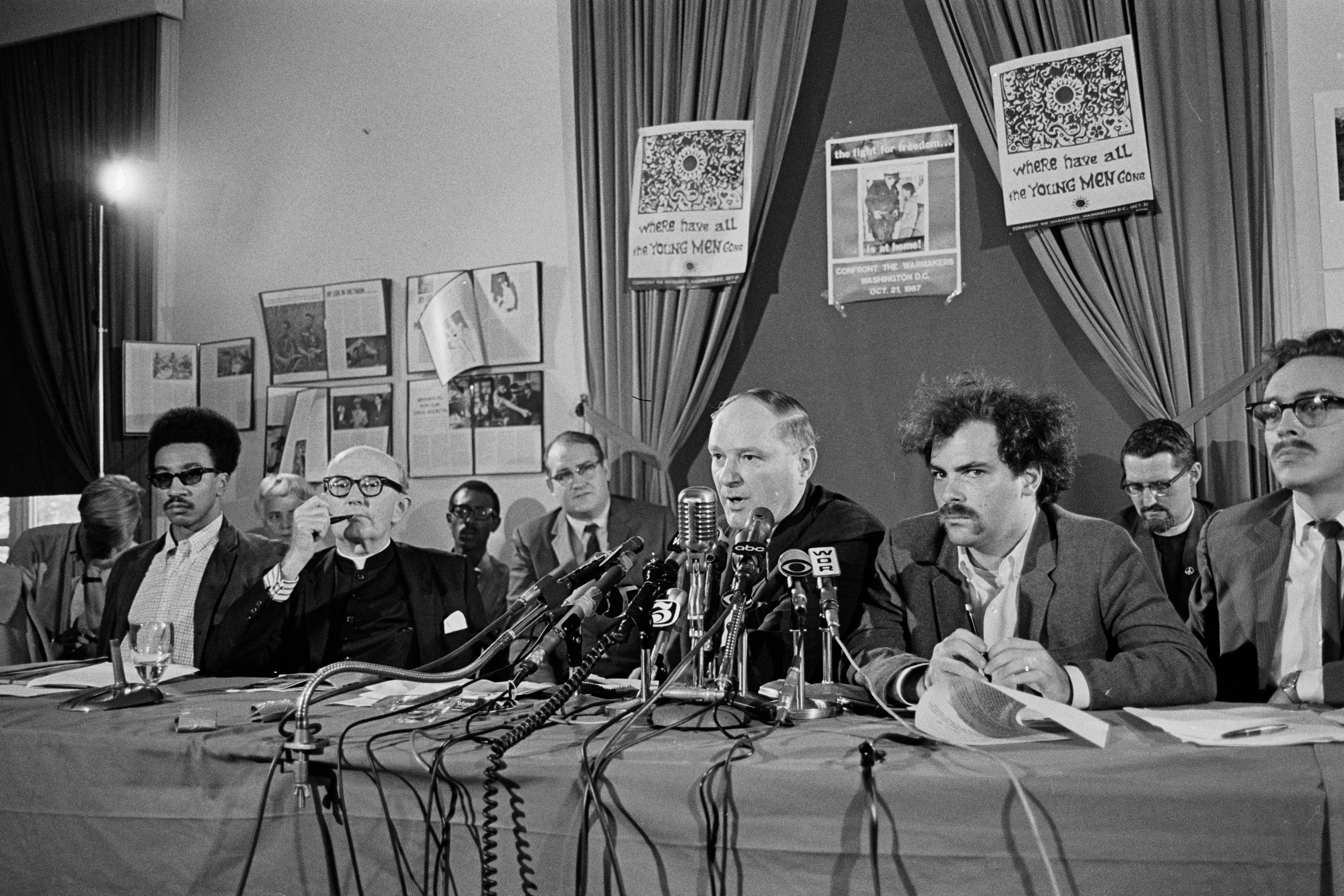
Brown (far left) at an anti-war press conference, August 1967

Brown was also charged with carrying a gun across state lines. A secret 1967 FBI memo had called for "neutralizing" Brown. He became a target of the agency's COINTELPRO program, which was intended to disrupt and disqualify civil rights leaders. The federal charges against him were never proven. Brown was defended in the gun violation case by civil rights advocates Murphy Bell of Baton Rouge, well-known radical lawyer William Kunstler, and Howard Moore Jr., general counsel for SNCC. Feminist attorney Flo Kennedy also assisted Brown and led his defense committee, winning support for him from some chapters of the National Organization for Women.

The Cambridge fire was among incidents investigated by the 1967 Kerner Commission. But their investigative documents were not published with their 1968 report. Historian Dr. Peter Levy studied these papers in researching his book Civil War on Race Street: The Civil Rights Movement in Cambridge, Maryland (2003). He argues there was no riot in Cambridge. Brown was documented as completing his speech in Cambridge at 10 pm July 24, then walking a woman home. He was shot by a deputy sheriff allegedly without provocation. Brown was hastily treated for his injuries and secretly taken by supporters out of Cambridge.

Later that night a small fire broke out, but the police chief and fire company did not respond until two later. In discussing his book, Levy has said that the fire's spread and ultimate destructive cost appeared to be due not to a riot, but to the deliberate inaction of the Cambridge police and fire departments, which had hostile relations with the black community. In a later book, Levy notes that Brice Kinnamon, head of the Cambridge police department, said that the city had no racial problems, and that Brown was the "sole" cause of the disorder, and it was "a well-planned Communist attempt to overthrow the government".

While being held for trial, Brown continued his high-profile activism. He accepted a request from the Student Afro-American Society of Columbia University to help represent and co-organize the April 1968 Columbia protests against university expansion into Harlem park land in order to build a gymnasium.

He also contributed writing from jail to the radical magazine Black Mask, which was edited and published by the New York activist group Up Against the Wall Motherfucker. In his 1968 article titled "H. Rap Brown From Prison: Lasima Tushinde Mbilashika", Brown writes of going on a hunger strike and his willingness to give up his life in order to achieve change.

Brown's trial was originally to take place in Cambridge, but there was a change of venue and the trial was moved to Bel Air, Maryland, to start in March 1970. On March 9, 1970, two SNCC officials, Ralph Featherstone and William ("Che") Payne, died on U.S. Route 1 south of Bel Air, when a bomb on the front floorboard of their car exploded, killing both occupants. The bomb's origin is disputed: some say the bomb was planted in an assassination attempt, and others say Payne was carrying it to the courthouse where Brown was to be tried. The next night, the Cambridge courthouse was bombed.

== 1970 and later life ==
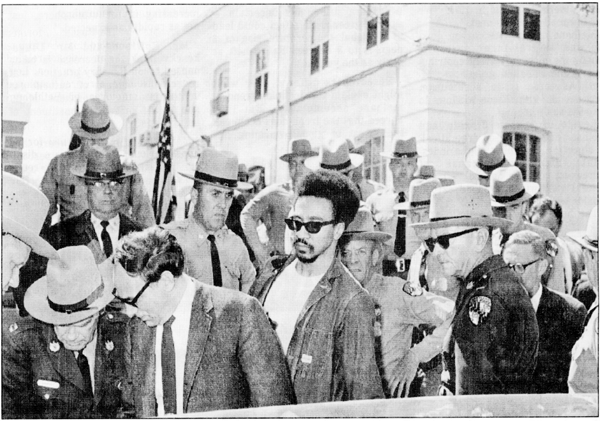
Brown, center, is seen in this April 1968 file photo with his lawyer, William M. Kunstler, left.

Brown was a fugitive from May 1970 until October 1971. He did not appear for trial and disappeared, causing him to be posted on the Federal Bureau of Investigation's Ten Most Wanted List. He was arrested after a reported shootout with officers in New York City following an attempted robbery of a bar there. He was convicted of robbery and served five years (1971–76) in Attica Prison in Western New York. While in prison, Brown converted to Islam, and changed his name to Jamil Abdullah al-Amin.

After his release, he moved to Atlanta, Georgia, where he operated a grocery store. He became an imam, a Muslim spiritual leader, in the National Ummah, one of the largest black Muslim groups in the United States. He also was a community activist in Atlanta's West End neighborhood. He preached against drugs and gambling. It has since been suggested that al-Amin changed his life again when he became affiliated with the Dar ul-Islam Movement.

== 2000 arrest and conviction ==
On May 31, 1999, al-Amin was pulled over in Marietta, Georgia for driving a suspected stolen vehicle. During a search, al-Amin was found to have a police badge in his pocket. He also had a bill of sale in his pocket, explaining his possession of the stolen car, and he claimed that he had been issued an honorary police badge by Mayor John Jackson, who served as the Mayor of White Hall, Alabama, Jackson verified this statement. Despite this, al-Amin was charged with speeding, auto theft, and impersonating a police officer.

On March 16, 2000, in Fulton County, Georgia, Sheriff's deputies Ricky Kinchen and Aldranon English went to al-Amin's home to execute an arrest warrant for failing to appear in court over the charges. After determining that the home was unoccupied, the deputies drove away and were shortly passed by a black Mercedes headed for the house. Kinchen (the more senior deputy) noted the suspect vehicle, turned the patrol car around, and drove up to the Mercedes, stopping nose to nose. English approached the Mercedes and told the single occupant to show his hands. The occupant opened fire with a .223 rifle. English ran between the two cars while returning fire from his handgun, and was hit four times. Kinchen was shot with the rifle and a 9 mm handgun.

A source said English identified him shortly before going into surgery for his wounds.

After the shootout, al-Amin fled Atlanta, going to White Hall, Alabama. He was tracked down by U.S. Marshals who started with a blood trail at the shooting site, and arrested by law enforcement officers after a four-day manhunt. Al-Amin was wearing body armor at the time of his arrest. He showed no wounds. During his arrest, an FBI Special Agent kicked and spat on al-Amin while he was handcuffed, declaring: "This is what we do to cop killers". The agent was reprimanded for his conduct. Officers found a 9 mm handgun near his arrest site. Firearms identification testing showed that this was used to shoot Kinchen and English, but al-Amin's fingerprints were not found on the weapon. Later, al-Amin's black Mercedes was found with bullet holes in it.

His lawyers argued he was innocent of the shooting. Defense attorneys noted that al-Amin's fingerprints were not found on the murder weapon, and he was not wounded in the shooting, as one of the deputies said the shooter was. A trail of blood found at the scene was tested and did not belong to al-Amin or either of the deputies. A test by the state concluded that it was animal blood, but these results have been disputed because there was no clear chain of custody to verify the sample and testing process. Deputy English had said that the killer's eyes were gray, but al-Amin's were brown.

At al-Amin's trial, prosecutors noted that he had never provided an alibi for his whereabouts at the time of the shootout, nor any explanation for fleeing the state afterward. He also did not explain why the weapons used in the shootout were found near him during his arrest; the defense had wanted to present evidence that Special Agent James Campbell, the officer who recovered the guns, had been accused of planting weapons in a previous case, but the judge barred them from using this evidence at trial.

On March 9, 2002, nearly two years after the shootings, al-Amin was convicted of 13 criminal charges, including Kinchen's murder and aggravated assault in shooting English. Four days later, he was sentenced to life in prison without possibility of parole (LWOP). He was sent to Georgia State Prison, the state's maximum-security facility near Reidsville, Georgia.

Otis Jackson, a man incarcerated for unrelated charges, claimed that he committed the Fulton County shootings, and confessed this two years before al-Amin was convicted of the same crime. The court did not consider Jackson's statement as evidence. Jackson's statements corroborated details from 911 calls following the shooting, including a bleeding man seen limping from the scene: Jackson said he knocked on doors to solicit a ride while suffering from wounds sustained in the firefight with deputies Kinchen and English. Jackson recanted his statement two days after making it, but later confessed again in a sworn affidavit, stating that he had only recanted after prison guards threatened him for being a "cop killer". Prosecutors refuted Jackson's testimony, claiming he couldn't have shot the deputies as he was wearing an ankle tag for house confinement that would have shown his location. Al-Amin's lawyers allege that the tag was faulty.

Al-Amin appealed his conviction on the basis of a racial conspiracy against him. In May 2004, the Supreme Court of Georgia unanimously ruled to uphold al-Amin's conviction.

In August 2007, al-Amin was transferred to federal custody, as Georgia officials decided he was too high-profile for the Georgia prison system to handle. He was first held in a holdover facility in the USP Atlanta; two weeks later he was moved to a federal transfer facility in Oklahoma, pending assignment to a federal penitentiary.

On October 21, 2007, al-Amin was transferred to ADX Florence, a supermax prison in Florence, Colorado. He was under an unofficial gag order, prevented from having any interviews with writers, journalists or biographers.

Al-Amin sought retrial through the 11th Circuit Court of Appeals. Investigative journalist, Hamzah Raza, has written more about Otis Jackson's confession to the deputy shootings in 2000, and said that this evidence should have been considered by the court. It had the potential of exonerating al-Amin. However, the 11th Circuit Court of Appeals rejected his appeal on July 31, 2019.

In April 2020, the U.S. Supreme Court declined to hear an appeal from al-Amin. His family and supporters continued to petition for a new trial.

In February 2026, the year after al-Amin's death, Fulton County District Attorney Fani Willis released the results of DNA testing performed on the murder weapon. Al-Amin's DNA was found on a belt wrapped around the weapon, but not on the weapon itself. Prosecutors argued that this new evidence, combined with the evidence presented at trial, clearly proved al-Amin's guilt.

== Health and death ==
On July 18, 2014, having been diagnosed with multiple myeloma, al-Amin was transferred to Butner Federal Medical Center in North Carolina. In the late 2010s to the early 2020s, he was incarcerated at the United States Penitentiary, Tucson.

In March 2025, al-Amin was transferred once again to FMC Butner after family members requested he receive medical help, having reportedly been treated for stage 4 cancer. He died at FMC Butner on November 23, 2025, at the age of 82. Imam Jamil Al Amin is buried in the Muslim Cemetery of Hialeah in Hialeah, Florida.

== Works ==
- Die Nigger Die!: A Political Autobiography, Westport, CT: Lawrence Hill Books, 1969; London: Allison & Busby, 1970.
- Revolution by the Book: The Rap Is Live, 1993.

== See also ==
- Timeline of the civil rights movement
- Anti-Riot Act of 1968
