= The MUJU Crew =

UK interfaith group

The MUJU Crew (MUJU) are a London-based group that bring Muslims and Jews together. Works include theatre productions, art festivals, commissions and other live events.

== History ==
MUJU began as "The Tricycle Muslim Jewish Youth Theatre Group" in 2004. Supported by the Tricycle Theatre, The Pears Foundation and One to One Children Foundation, the group’s main aim was to encourage young Muslims and Jews to meet for weekly drama workshops to allow members to express themselves creatively and explore themes of interest. The group soon began tackling issues of race, religion, poverty, social justice and youth culture.

Over time the theatre group became a melting pot of ideas. After three years, three plays and the first upSTARTS Festival in March 2008, the founding members of the MUJU workshops established the group as a registered charity.

== Works ==
MUJU has produced comedy nights, writing commissions, arts festivals, community work and awareness-raising performances.

In May 2010, The MUJU Crew embarked on their first tour with a double bill.

"Extreme Prevention" is a comedy sketch show set against the backdrop of the government’s "Preventing Extremism" strategy that includes radio campaigns warning that "If you suspect it, report it". Sketches include the reformed extremist desperate to educate the Muslim community on how not to be a fundamentalist and a doctor using ultrasound scans to search for extremists in the womb.

Walls is a play which tells the story of two British teenage friends, one Muslim and one Jewish, whose relationship is turned upside down when the Jewish boy’s family move to Israel. This play was written by Alia Bano.
