= Kalim Siddiqui (writer) =

Pakistani British writer and Islamic extremist leader (1931–1996)

- Born: 15 September 1931; Dondi Lohara, Central Provinces and Berar, British India
- Died: 18 April 1996 (aged 64); Pretoria, South Africa
- Education: University College London (PhD in International Relations, 1972)
- Occupations: Writer, political activist
- Era: 20th century
- Organization(s): Muslim Institute for Research and Planning, Muslim Parliament of Great Britain
- Known for: Founding the Muslim Parliament of Great Britain; support for Ayatollah Khomeini's fatwa against Salman Rushdie
- Notable work: In pursuit of the power of Islam (1996); The implications of the Rushdie affair for Muslims in Britain (1989); Stages of Islamic revolution (1996)
- Movement: Political Islam

Kalim Siddiqui (15 September 1931 - 18 April 1996) was a Pakistani British writer and Islamic activist. He gained notability for his controversial support of the fatwa issued by Iran's Ayatollah Khomeini, which called for the assassination of British author Sir Salman Rushdie amidst the Satanic Verses controversy.

== Early life ==
Siddiqui was born in the village of Dondi Lohara, CP, British India on 15 September 1931. He became increasing involved in politics as a teenager, when during a small demonstration close to his home town a bullet fired by a British soldier barely missed him, killing the youth behind him. After the creation of the state of Pakistan he briefly joined the Khilafat Movement in Karachi and became the editor of its newspaper, The Independent Leader. Along with other members of the movement, he moved to London in the early 1950s. In the mid 1960s he put himself through college and university, taking a degree in Economics and then, in 1972, a PhD in International Relations from University College, London. He founded the Muslim Institute for Research and Planning in London in 1972 and campaigned through his writings for political Islam.

== Supporting Iran ==
He publicly declared his support for the Islamic Revolution in Iran of 1979, and was later a defender of Ayatullah Khomeini's fatwa against Salman Rushdie.

== The Muslim Parliament ==
In 1989 he founded the Muslim Parliament of Great Britain. Although activism was certainly a major part of his life, the core of his work was a unique analysis, understanding and exposition of Muslim history and the contemporary situation facing Muslims which he developed and presented in a series of major writings and speeches. He died in Pretoria, South Africa on 18 April 1996, after attending the International Conference on Creating a New Civilization of Islam. He was an outspoken force in the need for an integrated body of Muslims which could exercise communal interests (the regulation of halal meat and the sighting of the Ramadan moon) and act as a lobbying body in the wider British community, like the Board of Deputies of British Jews.

== Works ==
1. Islamic development plan, Karachi: Umma Publishing House, 1970
2. Conflict, Crisis and War in Pakistan, London: Macmillan and New York, 1972
3. Towards a new destiny, London: Distributed by Newsmedia Book Service, 1974
4. The functions of international conflict : a socio-economic study of Pakistan, Karachi: The Royal Book Company, 1975
5. The state of the Muslim world today, London: Open Press in association with the Muslim Institute, 1980
6. Beyond the Muslim nation-states, London: Open Press Limited : Muslim Institute, 1980
7. The Islamic revolution : achievements, obstacles & goals, Open Press in association with the Muslim Institute, 1980
8. Political thought and behaviour of Muslims under colonialism, London: Muslim Institute, 1986
9. Issues in the Islamic Movement, London: Open Press, 1987
10. The implications of the Rushdie affair for Muslims in Britain, London : Muslim Institute, 1989
11. Muslims and the 'new world order', London : Muslim Institute, 1991
12. In pursuit of the power of Islam : major writings of Kalim Siddiqui (edited by Zafar Bangash), London: Open Press, 1996
13. Stages of Islamic revolution, London: Open Press, 1996

== Bibliography ==
- A life in the Islamic movement : Kalim Siddiqui 1931-1996. Slough, Middlesex: Crescent International. OCLC 1200034176.
