= The City Circle =

UK charity

The City Circle is a registered UK charity (Reg. No.1088931) and a network body of mainly young Muslim professionals. On 7 November 2006, The City Circle announced that it had appointed Yahya Birt as its first director with effect from December 2006. On 3 January 2008, it announced the appointment of Usama Hasan, whose father is Suhaib Hasan, as its new director.

== Projects ==
Current projects include a Saturday school, careers and mentoring and helping London's homeless.

== British Muslim Identity ==
The City Circle contributes to British Muslim Identity through its weekly discussion groups. It has also attracted controversy through policy of not aligning itself to any particular group or ideology. , where the MCB and its critics debated.

Following the veil controversy the City Circle organised a public meeting with Jack Straw, where Jack Straw defended his comments.
