= List of British Muslims =

This is a list of notable British Muslims.

== Academia and education ==
- Haroon Ahmed – Emeritus Professor of Microelectronics at the Cavendish Laboratory, the Physics Department of the University of Cambridge
- Sara Ahmed – Professor of Race and Cultural Studies at Goldsmiths and academic working at the intersection of feminist theory, queer theory, critical race theory and postcolonialism
- Shabbir Akhtar – Honorary Research Fellow, Faculty of Theology and Religions at University of Oxford
- Ash Amin – Head of Geography at Cambridge University
- Ali Ansari – university professor at the University of St Andrews
- Khizar Humayun Ansari – academic who was awarded an OBE in 2002 for his work in the field of race and ethnic relations.
- Sarah Ansari – professor of history at Royal Holloway, University of London
- Tipu Zahed Aziz – professor of neurosurgery at the John Radcliffe Hospital in Oxford; lecturer at Magdalen College, Oxford and Imperial College London medical school
- Reza Banakar – professor of socio-legal studies at the University of Westminster, London
- Quassim Cassam – Professor of Philosophy at the University of Warwick
- Abbas Edalat – university professor at Imperial College London
- Mohammed Ghanbari – professor at the University of Essex
- Joel Hayward – New Zealand-born British scholar of early Islamic history, especially the biography of Muhammad
- Dilwar Hussain – research fellow at The Islamic Foundation in Leicester; co-authored the 2004 book British Muslims Between Assimilation and Segregation; is on the Home Office's committee tackling radicalisation and extremism
- Musharraf Hussain – scientist, educator and religious scholar, the Chief executive of the Karimia Institute Nottingham. Awarded an OBE by Her Majesty the Queen in 2008 for his services to community relations.
- Saiful Islam – Professor of Materials Chemistry at the University of Bath and a recipient of the Royal Society Wolfson Research Merit award.
- Naila Kabeer – Social economist, research fellow and writer. She works primarily on poverty, gender and social policy issues. Her research interests include gender, poverty, social exclusion, labour markets and livelihoods, social protection, focussed on South and South East Asia.
- Amir Kassam – visiting professor in the School of Agriculture, Policy and Development at the University of Reading
- Syma Khalid - biophysicist who is a professor of Computational Biophysics in Chemistry at the University of Southampton.
- Mushtaq Khan – Heterodox economist and Professor of Economics at the School of Oriental and African Studies. His work focuses on the economics of poor countries, including contributions to the field of institutional economics and South Asian development.
- Yasmin Khan – historian of British India and associate professor of history at The University of Oxford
- Ehsan Masood – science writer, journalist and broadcaster; editor of Research Fortnight and Research Europe; teaches International Science Policy at Imperial College London
- Azra Meadows OBE – honorary lecturer in the Institute of Biomedical and Life Sciences at The University of Glasgow
- Ali Mobasheri – associate professor and reader at University of Surrey
- Tariq Modood – Professor of Sociology, Politics and Public Policy at the University of Bristol
- Kalbe Razi Naqvi – British Pakistani physicist, who has been ordinarily resident in Norway since 1977, working as a professor of biophysics in the Norwegian University of Science and Technology
- Nazneen Rahman – geneticist who specialises in cancer and heads up the Cancer Genetics Clinical Unit at the Royal Marsden. Her research has seen success in identifying genes that cause cancer particularly in women and children.
- Ziauddin Sardar – scholar, writer and cultural critic
- Ghulam Sarwar – Director of the Muslim Educational Trust; writer on Islam in English, wrote the first English textbook, Islam: Beliefs and Teachings, for madrasah students in Britain, which is used worldwide in religious education classes, especially in British schools
- Salman Sayyid – Professor of Social Theory and Decolonial Thought at the University of Leeds
- Ghayasuddin Siddiqui – academic and political activist
- Jawed Siddiqi – professor emeritus of software engineering at Sheffield Hallam University and political activist
- Mona Siddiqui – University of Edinburgh Professor of Islamic Studies a Public Understanding; regular contributor to BBC Radio 4, The Times, Scotsman, The Guardian, and The Herald
- Azim Surani – developmental biologist who has been Marshall–Walton Professor at the Wellcome Trust/Cancer Research UK Gurdon Institute at the University of Cambridge since 1992, and Director of Germline and Epigenomics Research since 2013.
- Saeed Vaseghi – professor at Brunel University

== Business and finance ==
- Abdul Latif – restaurateur known for his dish "Curry Hell". He died in 2008.
- Adam Kamani – CEO of Kamani Property Group and KM Capital as well as a co-founder of PrettyLittleThing.
- Afzal Kahn – Bradford-based entrepreneur; owns a specialist car design company; broke records in 2008 for paying £440,000 for a distinctive "F1" number plate; previously showed an interest in purchasing Newcastle football club
- Ali Parsa – former chief executive officer of private healthcare partnership Circle
- Alireza Sagharchi – principal at Stanhope Gate Architecture
- Amar Latif – Scottish entrepreneur, television personality and professional traveller
- Aneel Mussarat – property millionaire; his company, MCR Property Group, rents apartments to university students in Manchester and Liverpool
- Sir Anwar Pervez – Pakistan-born billionaire businessman; 6th richest Asian in Great Britain and the richest Muslim; founder of the Bestway Group
- Asad Shamim – British businessperson, founder of Furniture in Fashion, and winner of British Muslim Awards in 2019 and 2024.
- Asif Aziz – London-based billionaire entrepreneur and philanthropist.
- Asim Siddiqui – chairman and a founding trustee of The City Circle
- Atique Choudhury – restaurateur; his restaurant Yum Yum won Best Thai Restaurant in London at the 2012 Asian Curry Awards
- Bajloor Rashid MBE – businessman and former president of the Bangladesh Caterers Association
- Enam Ali MBE – restaurateur; founder of the British Curry Awards and Spice Business Magazine
- Farad Azima – industrialist, inventor and philanthropist
- Farshid Moussavi – founder of Foreign Office Architects
- Firoz Kassam – owned Oxford United F.C. from 1999 to 2006, and was named the 309th wealthiest person in the UK in the Sunday Times Rich List 2009 with an estimated fortune of £180 million.
- Gulam Noon, Baron Noon – founder of Noon products, manufacturing chilled and frozen ready meals
- Husna Ahmad – Bangladeshi-born British humanitarian; chief executive officer of the Faith Regen Foundation; sits on the advisory board to the East London Mosque; previously sat on the Department for Work and Pensions' Ethnic Minority Advisory Group
- Iqbal Ahmed OBE – entrepreneur, chairman and chief executive of Seamark Group'; made his fortune in shrimp; the highest British Bangladeshi to feature on the Sunday Times Rich List (placed at number 511 in 2006)
- Iqbal Wahhab OBE – entrepreneur, restaurateur, journalist, publisher; founder of Tandoori Magazine and multi-award-winning restaurant Cinnamon Club
- Kaveh Alamouti – head of Global Macro Citadel LLC; chief executive officer of Citadel Asset Management Europe
- Mahmud Kamani – billionaire businessman, the co-founder of and joint CEO of Boohoo.com.
- Mahmoud Khayami, KSS – industrialist; founder of Iran Khodro
- Mo Chaudry – born in Pakistan, he was raised in England and went on to become a millionaire businessman in the West Midlands
- Mohammad Ajman 'Tommy Miah' – internationally renowned celebrity chef, award-winning restaurateur, founder and promoter of the Indian Chef of the Year Competition
- Mohammad Zahoor – Ukraine-based British-Pakistani billionaire businessman and philanthropist.
- Mohsin Issa – billionaire, businessman and founder of Euro Garages, a chain of petrol filling stations that operate in the United Kingdom and Europe.
- Moorad Choudhry – managing director, Head of Business Treasury, Global Banking & Markets at Royal Bank of Scotland plc
- Mumtaz Khan Akbar – founder and owner of the Mumtaz brand
- Muquim Ahmed – entrepreneur; became the first Bangladeshi millionaire at the age of 26, due to diversification in banking, travel, a chain of restaurants with the Cafe Naz group, publishing and property development
- Mustafa Suleyman – entrepreneur, activist and, most notably, the co-founder and Head of Applied AI at DeepMind, an artificial intelligence company acquired by Alphabet.
- Naguib Kheraj – vice-chairman of Barclays Bank; former boss of JP Morgan Cazenove Chairman of the Aga Khan Foundation based in Karachi
- Nasser Golzari – principal at Golzari (NG) Architects
- Leepu Nizamuddin Awlia – car engineer and coachbuilder who converts rusty old cars into imitation supercars in a workshop on Discovery Channel reality television programme Bangla Bangers/Chop Shop: London Garage
- Mohammed Ibrahim Khan – Serial Entrepreneur and a Fintech evangelist
- Ragib Ali – industrialist, pioneer tea-planter, educationalist, philanthropist, and banker
- Ruzwana Bashir – British businesswoman, founder and CEO of Peek.com, travel company based in San Francisco, California
- Shelim Hussain MBE – entrepreneur, founder and managing director of Euro Foods (UK) Limited
- Siraj Ali – restaurateur and philanthropist; recipient of the 2011 British Bangladeshi Who's Who "Outstanding Contribution" Award
- Sultan Choudhury – businessman; managing director of the Islamic Bank of Britain
- Syed Ahmed – entrepreneur, businessman, and television personality; candidate on BBC reality television programme The Apprentice series 2 in 2006
- Tahir Mohsan – founder of Time Computers, Supanet, Tpad; manages several investment companies from his base in Dubai
- Tarak Ramzan – founder and CEO of the Quiz womenswear retail chain.
- Waliur Rahman Bhuiyan OBE – managing director and Country Head of BOC Bangladesh Limited, one of the first British companies to invest in Bangladesh in the 1950s to produce and supply industrial and medical gases
- Zuber Issa – billionaire, businessman and founder of Euro Garages, a chain of petrol filling stations that operate in the United Kingdom and Europe.

== Entertainment ==
- Aasif Mandvi – British-American actor and comedian
- Abdullah Afzal – actor and stand-up comedian
- Abid Khan - Director
- Adil Ray – actor, writer and broadcaster. Creator of BBC One sitcom Citizen Khan.
- Adnan Sami – singer, musician, pianist, actor and composer
- Afshan Azad – actress best known for playing the role of Padma Patil in the Harry Potter film series
- Ahmad Hussain – singer-songwriter, executive, Record producer and founder and managing director of IQRA Promotions
- Ahmed Salim – award-winning British producer, known for 1001 Inventions
- Akram Khan MBE – dancer and choreographer; named Outstanding Newcomer 2000, Best Modern Choreography 2002, and Outstanding Male or Female Artist (Modern) 2005 at the Critics' Circle National Dance Awards
- Alyy Khan – film and television actor and host
- Ali Shahalom – comedian who hosts the comedy YouTube channel Aliofficial1
- Annie Khalid – English-Pakistani musician and model
- Aqib Khan – actor; played Sajid Khan in the movie West is West
- Art Malik – Pakistani-born British actor who achieved fame in the 1980s through his starring and subsidiary roles in assorted British and Merchant-Ivory television serials and films
- Asif Kapadia – British filmmaker
- Aziz Ibrahim – musician best known for his work as guitarist with Simply Red, The Stone Roses (post-John Squire)
- Babar Ahmed – British/American writer/director of Pashtun and Pakistani descent; according to the BBC
- Babar Bhatti – actor; played Punkah Wallah Rumzan in the BBC sitcom It Ain't Half Hot Mum.
- Badi Uzzaman – television and film actor
- Boyan Uddin Chowdhury – former lead guitarist of rock band The Zutons
- Chunkz – British YouTube personality, host, entertainer and former musician
- Dino Shafeek – actor and comedian who starred in several sitcoms during the 1970s and early 1980s; played Char Wallah Muhammed in It Ain't Half Hot Mum and Ali Nadim in Mind Your Language
- Guz Khan – comedian and actor
- Hannan Majid – documentary filmmaker whose films have been exhibited at international film festivals including Emirates, Cambridge, Durban, and Leeds
- Jamil Dehlavi – London-based independent film director and producer of Pakistani-French origin.
- Farook Shamsher – alternative dub/dance music DJ and record producer; received the Commitment to Scene award at the UK Asian Music Awards 2006
- Hadi Khorsandi – comedian
- Humza Arshad – actor and comedian; producer of the YouTube series Diary of a Badman
- Ian Iqbal Rashid – poet, screenwriter and film director, known for the series This Life and Leaving Normal (TV series), and the feature films Touch of Pink and How She Move
- Idris Rahman – clarinettist
- Jan Uddin – actor best known for his roles as Jalil Iqbal in BBC soap opera EastEnders and Sweet Boy in the film Shank
- Jay Shareef – award-winning stand-up comedian, broadcaster and journalist.
- Jeff Mirza – stand-up comedian and actor
- Kaniz Ali – makeup artist and freelance beauty columnist; named Best Make-Up Artist at the 2011International Asian Fashion Awards
- Kayvan Novak – actor; star of Fonejacker
- Kishon Khan – pianist and bandleader of Lokkhi Terra
- Munsur Ali – film producer, screenwriter and director; in 2014, he wrote, directed and produced Shongram, a romantic drama set during the 1971 Bangladesh Liberation War; first time a British film was simultaneously written, produced and directed by a British Bangladeshi
- Mazhar Munir – television and film actor; before co-starring in the 2005 movie Syriana, he appeared in three British television shows: The Bill, Mile High, and Doctors
- Menhaj Huda – film and television director, producer and screenwriter; directed and produced Kidulthood in 2006
- Mina Anwar – British actress; played Police Constable Maggie Habib in the sitcom The Thin Blue Line
- Mo Ali – Somali-British film director
- Muhammad Mumith Ahmed (Mumzy Stranger) – R&B and hip-hop singer, songwriter; first musician of Bangladeshi descent to release a single, "One More Dance"; namedBest Urban Act at the UK Asian Music Awards 2011
- Murtz – television and radio presenter
- Nabil Abdul Rashid – comedian of Nigerian descent
- Nadine Shah – singer, songwriter and musician
- Nadia Manzoor - writer, performer, and producer based in Brooklyn, New York.
- Natasha Khan – known by her stage name as "Bat for Lashes"; half Pakistani half English singer-songwriter and multi-instrumentalist
- Naz Ikramullah – British-Canadian artist and film producer of Pakistani origin
- Nazeel Azami – Nasheed singer-songwriter signed to Awakening Records
- Nazrin Choudhury – screenwriter; actress in drama serials; her critically acclaimed radio play "Mixed Blood" won the Richard Imison Award 2006
- Prince Abdi – Somali-born British stand-up comedian
- Rani Taj – dhol player dubbed as "Dhol Queen" after her YouTube video went viral
- Riz Ahmed – actor who played Omar in the movie Four Lions and Changez in The Reluctant Fundamentalist
- Ruhul Amin – film director; has made 13 films for the BBC and Channel 4; most of his works are documentaries and experimental dramas
- Runa Islam – film and photography visual artist, nominated for the Turner Prize 2008
- Sadia Azmat – stand-up comedian
- Sanchita Islam – artist, writer and filmmaker; in 1999, she founded Pigment Explosion, which has branched out into projects including film, painting, drawing, writing and photography
- Sadik Ahmed – film director, cinematographer, and writer; wrote and directed international award-winning short film Tanju Miah, which was the first Bangladeshi film in the Toronto, Sundance, and Amsterdam film festivals in 2007
- Saifullah 'Sam' Zaman – DJ and producer associated with the Asian Underground movement, recording as "State of Bengal"
- Sakina Samo – award-winning actress, producer and director
- Sami Yusuf – musician
- Selma Chalabi – radio producer and journalist for BBC Wales. She was born in the United Kingdom to an Iraqi father and English mother, and was raised in Winchester.
- Shabana Bakhsh – actress who has appeared in soaps such as River City and Doctors
- Shahid Khan – known as "Naughty Boy"; British-born Pakistani songwriter, record producer and musician
- Shahin Badar – singer and songwriter, best known for vocals on The Prodigy's single "Smack My Bitch Up", which earned her a Double Platinum award
- Shefali Chowdhury – actress best known for playing the role of Parvati Patil in the Harry Potter film series
- Shazia Mirza – comedian from Birmingham, England, whose act revolves around her Muslim faith
- Sophiya Haque – actress, singer and video jockey; played Poppy Morales in Coronation Street, 2008–2009.
- Suleman Mirza – lead dancer of Signature, runner-up on Britain's Got Talent 2008
- Tan France – fashion designer, television personality, and author. He is currently the fashion expert for the Netflix series Queer Eye.
- Tez Ilyas – stand-up comedian of Pakistani descent
- Yusuf Islam/Cat Stevens
- Zahra Ahmadi – actress

== Journalism and media ==
- Sheikh Abdul Qayum – chief imam of the East London Mosque; former lecturer at the international International Islamic University Malaysia; television presenter on Peace TV Bangla and Channel S
- A. N. M. Serajur Rahman – journalist, broadcaster, and Bangladeshi nationalist
- Aasmah Mir – BBC presenter and former columnist for the Sunday Herald
- Abdul Gaffar Choudhury – writer, journalist, and columnist for Bengali newspapers of Bangladesh; best known for his lyric "Amar Bhaier Rokte Rangano", which has become the main song commemorating the Language Movement
- Adil Ray – British radio and television presenter, for BBC Asian Network
- Adnan Nawaz – news and sports presenter for the BBC World Service
- Ajmal Masroor – television presenter, politician, imam, and UK Parliamentary candidate for Bethnal Green and Bow constituency representing Liberal Democrats in the 2010 general election; television presenter on political and Islamic programmes on Islam Channel and Channel S
- Ali Abbasi – former Scottish TV presenter
- Arif Ali – regional product director for the Associated Press news agency in Europe, Middle East and Africa
- Asad Ahmad – BBC journalist and news presenter
- Asad Qureshi – filmmaker who was kidnapped on 26 March 2010 by a militant group called the "Asian Tigers" in Pakistan's Federally Administered Tribal Areas
- Azad Ali – IT worker and civil servant for the HM Treasury; Islamic Forum of Europe spokesman; founding chair of the Muslim Safety Forum; vice-chair of Unite Against Fascism
- Azeem Rafiq – English cricketer
- Faisal Islam – economics editor and correspondent for Channel 4 News; named 2006 "Young Journalist of the Year" at the Royal Society of Television awards
- Fareena Alam – editor of British Muslim magazine Q News; named Media Professional of the Year by Islamic Relief in 2005 and at the Asian Women of Achievement Awards in 2006
- Faris Kermani – film director based in the UK, now head of production company based in London, Crescent Films
- Hassan Ghani – Scottish broadcast journalist and documentary filmmaker, based in London
- Javed Malik – television anchor; publisher of the UAE's first diplomatic magazine, The International Diplomat; executive director of the World Forum; served as Pakistan's Ambassador at Large and Special Advisor to The Prime Minister; close friend of former Prime Minister Benazir Bhutto and Prime Minister Nawaz Sharif of Pakistan
- Kamran Abbasi – doctor, medical editor, and cricket writer; editor of the Journal of the Royal Society of Medicine; acting editor of the British Medical Journal; editor of the bulletin of the World Health Organization
- Kanak 'Konnie' Huq – television presenter, best known for being the longest-serving female Blue Peter presenter
- Lisa Aziz – news presenter and journalist, best known as the co-presenter of the Bristol-based ITV West Country nightly weekday news programme The West Country Tonight; one of the first Asian presenters to be seen on television; won the Ethnic Multicultural Media Academy Best Television News Journalist Award
- Mazher Mahmood (also known as the "Fake Sheikh") – often dubbed as "Britain's most notorious undercover reporter"; in a GQ survey was voted as the 45th most powerful man in Britain; the News of the World paid his six-figure salary, plus an editorial and technical support budget
- Mehdi Hasan – senior politics editor at the New Statesman and a former news and current affairs editor at Channel 4
- Miqdaad Versi – assistant secretary general of the Muslim Council of Britain, media commentator, and advocate for accurate reporting on Muslims.
- Mishal Husain – anchor for BBC World
- Muhammad Abdul Bari – Chairman of the East London Mosque; Secretary General of the Muslim Council of Britain, 2006–2010
- Nafeez Mosaddeq Ahmed – environment writer for The Guardian, t
- Nazenin Ansari – journalist, former correspondent for Voice of America's Persian News Network; Iranian analyst for BBC Radio 4, CNN International, Sky News and Aljazeera
- Nazia Mogra – television journalist for BBC North West Tonight news on BBC One
- Nima Nourizadeh – film director
- Nina Hossain – journalist, newscaster, and sole presenter of ITV London's regional news programme London Tonight
- Nurul Islam – broadcast journalist, radio producer, and presenter best remembered for his work with the BBC World Service
- Osama Saeed – Head of International and Media Relations at the Al Jazeera Media Network
- Rageh Omaar – Somali-born British journalist and writer
- Reham Khan – journalist and anchor currently working at Dawn News
- Rizwan Khan – works for Al Jazeera English; has his own show called Riz Khan
- Saima Mohsin – British journalist
- Saira Khan – runner-up on the first series of The Apprentice, and now a TV presenter on BBC's Temper Your Temper and Desi DNA
- Sarfraz Manzoor – British writer, journalist, documentary maker, and broadcaster; writes regularly for The Guardian; presents documentaries on BBC Radio 4
- Secunder Kermani - journalist who is Foreign Correspondent for Channel 4 News. He was previously a reporter on the BBC's flagship current affairs programme Newsnight.
- Shamim Chowdhury – television and print journalist for Al Jazeera English
- Shereen Nanjiani – radio journalist with BBC Radio Scotland
- Syed Neaz Ahmad – academic, writer, journalist, columnist and critic; best known for anchoring NTV Europe current affairs talk show Talking Point
- Tasmin Lucia-Khan – journalist, presenter and producer; delivered BBC Three's nightly hourly World News bulletins on in 60 Seconds; presented E24 on the rolling news channel BBC News; presents news on the ITV breakfast television programme Daybreak
- Tazeen Ahmad – British television and radio presenter and reporter
- Yasmin Alibhai-Brown – journalist and author born in Uganda; regular columnist for The Independent and the Evening Standard
- Yvonne Ridley – journalist and Respect Party activist
- Zarqa Nawaz – freelance writer, journalist, broadcaster, and filmmaker
- Unzela Khan, British Pakistani journalist.

== Law and justice ==
=== Judges ===
- Tan Ikram – appointed as a District Judge (Magistrates' Courts) in 2003
- Akhlaq Choudhury – British High Court judge of England and Wales

=== King's Counsels ===
- Karim Asad Ahmad Khan QC – barrister at Temple Garden Chambers, London, chief prosecutor at the International Criminal Court
- Khawar Qureshi QC - barrister and international lawyer.

=== Other ===
- Aamer Anwar – Glaswegian solicitor; named as Criminal Lawyer of the Year by the Law Awards of Scotland in 2005 and 2006
- Amal Clooney – London-based Lebanese-British lawyer, activist, and author
- M. A. Muid Khan – barrister who was selected as the Best Human Rights Lawyer of England and Wales for 2012 by the Chartered Institute of Legal Executives; in September 2012, he was ranked as third in the top five Chartered Legal Executive Lawyers of England and Wales by the Law Society
- Mumtaz Hussain – solicitor and radio presenter; since 2010, she has presented Health and Healing with Mumtaz on RedShift Radio
- Nazir Afzal OBE – Chief Crown Prosecutor for North West England; one of his first decisions in that role was to initiate prosecutions in the case of the Rochdale sex trafficking gang
- Talha Ahmad – British barrister and human rights activist. Treasurer of the Muslim council of Britiain from 2016 to 2018.

== Literature and art ==
- Aamer Hussein – short story writer and critic.
- Abdur Rouf Choudhury – Bengali diaspora writer and philosopher; numerous literary awards from Bangladesh including the Granthomela award and life membership from Bangla Academy
- Diriye Osman – Somali-British writer and visual artist
- Mohammed Mahbub "Ed" Husain – author of The Islamist, an account of his experience for five years with the Hizb ut-Tahrir
- Emran Mian – author and policy advisor at Whitehall
- Ghulam Murshid – author, scholar and journalist; numerous literary awards from India and Bangladesh, including the Bangla Academy award
- Idris Khan – artist based in London
- Imtiaz Dharker – poet and documentary filmmaker
- Kaniz Ali – makeup artist and freelance beauty columnist; won the "Best Make-Up Artist" category at the 2011 International Asian Fashion Awards
- Kia Abdullah – novelist and journalist; contributes to The Guardian newspaper and has written two novels
- Mohsin Hamid – Pakistani writer; novels Moth Smoke (2000), The Reluctant Fundamentalist (2007), and How to Get Filthy Rich in Rising Asia (2013)
- Monica Ali – author of Brick Lane, a novel based on a Bangladeshi woman
- Moniza Alvi – poet and writer
- Nadeem Aslam – novelist
- Nadifa Mohamed – Somali-British novelist
- Nafeez Mosaddeq Ahmed – author, lecturer, political scientist specialising in interdisciplinary security studies
- Nasser Azam – contemporary artist, living and working in London
- Omar Mansoor – London-based fashion designer, best known for his couture occasionwear
- Qaisra Shahraz – novelist, journalist, Fellow of the Royal Society of Arts and a director of Gatehouse Books
- Rasheed Araeen – London-based conceptual artist, sculptor, painter, writer, and curator
- Razia Iqbal – arts correspondent for the BBC; born in East Africa, of Muslim Punjabi origin
- Rekha Waheed – writer and novelist best known as the author of The A-Z Guide To Arranged Marriage
- Rezia Wahid MBE – award-winning textile artist whose work has been exhibited both in the UK and abroad
- Rizvan Rahman
- Roopa Farooki – novelist
- Ruby Hammer MBE – fashion and beauty makeup artist; founder of Ruby & Millie cosmetics bran
- Runa Islam – film and photography visual artist, nominated for the Turner Prize 2008
- Rupa Huq – senior lecturer in sociology at Kingston University, writer, columnist, Labour Party politician, music DJ and former Deputy Mayoress of the London Borough of Ealing
- S. F. Said – children's author
- Sanchita Islam – visual media artist
- Shahida Rahman – award-winning author of Lascar, writer and publisher
- Shamim Azad – bilingual poet, storyteller and writer
- Shamshad Khan – Manchester-based poet born in Leeds; editor of anthology of black women's poetry; advised the Arts Council of England North West on literature
- Shezad Dawood – artist based in London
- Suhayl Saadi – literary and erotic novelist and radio/stage playwright
- Tahmima Anam – author of A Golden Age, the "Best First Book" winner of the 2008 Commonwealth Writers' Prize
- Vaseem Khan - writer, author of the Baby Ganesh Detective Agency novels
- Zarina Bhimji – Ugandan Asian photographer, based in London. She was nominated for the Turner Prize in 2007
- Ziauddin Sardar – scholar, writer and cultural critic

== Military and police ==
- Ali Dizaei – senior police officer.
- Amjad Hussain – senior Royal Navy officer. He is the highest-ranking member of the British Armed Forces from an ethnic minority
- Muhammed Akbar Khan – served as a British recruit in the First World War and an officer in Second World War; first Muslim to become a general in the British Army
- Tarique Ghaffur – high-ranking British police officer in London's Metropolitan Police Service; Assistant Commissioner–Central Operations

== Policy ==
- Abul Fateh – diplomat and statesman; first Foreign Secretary of Bangladesh after independence in 1971
- Anwar Choudhury – British High Commissioner for Bangladesh, 2004–2008; first non-white British person to be appointed in a senior diplomatic post; Director of International Institutions at the Foreign & Commonwealth Office
- Asif Ahmad – British diplomat who served as the British Ambassador to Thailand from November 2010 until August 2012; since July 2013, he has been British Ambassador to the Philippines
- Nahid Majid OBE – civil servant, chief operating officer of Regeneration Investment Organisation and deputy director within the Department for Work and Pensions the most senior British Bangladeshi Muslim woman in the civil service
- Saleemul Huq – scientist and Senior Fellow in the Climate Change Group at the International Institute for Environment and Development; recipient of the 2007 Burtoni Award for his work on climate change adaptation
- Talyn Rahman-Figueroa – director of diplomatic consultancy Grassroot Diplomat.

== Politics ==
=== Members of Parliament ===
- Abtisam Mohamed - Labour MP for Sheffield Central
- Adnan Hussain - Independent MP for Blackburn
- Adam Jogee - Labour MP for Newcastle-under-Lyme
- Afzal Khan – Labour MP for Manchester Gorton solicitor and former Labour MEP for North West region; first Asian Lord Mayor of Manchester; currently Manchester City Council's Executive Member for Children's Services
- Anas Sarwar – former Scottish Labour Party Leader and former Labour MP for Glasgow Central
- Anum Qaisar-Javed – Former Scottish National Party MP for Airdrie and Shotts
- Apsana Begum – Labour Party MP for Poplar and Limehouse since 2019
- Ayoub Khan - Independent MP for Birmingham Perry Barr
- Faisal Rashid – Former Labour MP for Warrington South, elected in 2017. Mayor of Warrington in 2016.
- Feryal Clark – Labour Party politician who has served as the Member of Parliament for Enfield North since the 2019 United Kingdom general election
- Imran Ahmad Khan – Former Conservative Party Member of Parliament (MP) for Wakefield; convicted child sex offender.
- Imran Hussain – Labour MP for Bradford East
- Iqbal Mohamed - Independent MP for Dewsbury and Batley
- Khalid Mahmood – Former Labour MP for Birmingham Perry Barr
- Mohammad Sarwar – Former Labour MP for Glasgow Central; first British Muslim and Pakistani origin MP
- Mohammad Yasin – Labour MP for Bedford, elected in 2017.
- Naushabah Khan - Labour MP for Gillingham and Rainham
- Naz Shah – Labour MP for the constituency of Bradford West
- Nesil Caliskan - Labour MP for Barking
- Nus Ghani – Conservative MP for Sussex Weald and formerly Wealden
- Rehman Chishti – Former Conservative MP for Gillingham and Rainham
- Rosena Allin-Khan – Labour MP for Tooting
- Rupa Huq – Labour MP for Ealing Central and Acton constituency
- Rushanara Ali – Labour MP for Bethnal Green and Bow Labour Party constituency; first person of Bangladeshi origin elected to the House of Commons; one of the first three Muslim women elected as a member of parliament
- Sadik Al-Hassan - Labour MP for North Somerset
- Sadiq Khan – Mayor of London, former Labour MP for Tooting and former Shadow Secretary of State for Justice and Shadow Lord Chancellor
- Saqib Bhatti – Conservative MP for Meriden, first elected in the 2019 United Kingdom general election.
- Shahid Malik – Former Labour MP for Dewsbury; Minister for International Development in Gordon Brown's government
- Shabana Mahmood – Labour MP For Birmingham Ladywood
- Shockat Adam - Independent MP for Leicester South
- Tahir Ali – Labour MP for Birmingham Hall Green.
- Tasmina Ahmed-Sheikh – Former SNP MP for Ochil and South Perthshire
- Tulip Siddiq – Labour MP for Hampstead and Kilburn constituency
- Yasmin Qureshi – Labour MP for Bolton South East
- Zarah Sultana – Labour Party MP for Coventry South
- Zubir Ahmed - Labour MP for Glasgow South West

=== Peers ===
- Aamer Sarfraz, Baron Sarfraz – former Conservative party treasurer
- Adam Hafejee, Lord Patel of Blackburn
- Amirali Alibhai, Lord Bhatia – life peer
- Arminka Helic, Baroness Helic – Bosnian-born British Special Adviser (SPAD) and Chief of Staff to the Former British Foreign Secretary William Hague
- Zameer Choudrey, Lord Choudrey CBE – Conservative life peer, businessman
- Gulam Khaderbhoy, Lord Noon MBE – life peer, businessman and Chancellor of the University of East London
- Haleh, Baroness Afshar – Professor in Politics and Women's Studies at the University of York, England
- Khalid, Lord Hameed – Chairman of Alpha Hospital Group; chairman and chief executive officer of the London International Hospital
- Kishwer Falkner, Baroness Falkner of Margravine – lead Liberal Democrat Spokesperson for Foreign Affairs in the House of Lords
- Meral, Baroness Hussein-Ece – Liberal Democrat life peeress
- Mohamed Iltaf, Lord Sheikh – Chairman of Conservative Muslim Forum
- Nazir, Lord Ahmed – Crossbench life peer, formerly Labour now retired.
- Nemat Shafik, Baroness Shafik – served as the director of the London School of Economics since September 2017.
- Nosheena Mobarik, Baroness Mobarik – Conservative Baroness of Mearns in the County of Renfrewshire; former Chairman of CBI Scotland
- Manzila Pola, Baroness Uddin – Labour Party life peer, community activist, and first Muslim and Asian to sit in the House of Lords
- Qurban, Lord Hussain – Liberal Democrat life peer
- Sayeeda Hussain, Baroness Warsi – lawyer and British politician for the Conservative Party and a former member of the Cabinet
- Shaista Gohir, Baroness Gohir OBE - Crossbench life peer
- Shas Sheehan, Baroness Sheehan – Liberal Democrat and Baroness of Wimbledon in the London Borough of Merton and of Tooting in the London Borough of Wandsworth
- Syed Salah Kamall, Baron Kamall – Professor of Politics and International Relations at St Mary's University, Twickenham and the Academic & Research Director at the Institute of Economic Affairs, a classical liberal think tank in London.
- Waheed, Lord Alli – Labour life peer
- Wajid Khan, Baron Khan – Labour Baron of Burnley
- Zahida Manzoor, Baroness Manzoor – Liberal Democrat Baroness; former Legal Services Ombudsman; former Deputy Chair of the Commission for Racial Equality

=== Members of Scottish Parliament ===
- Anas Sarwar – Leader of the Scottish Labour party and Labour MSP for the Glasgow region
- Bashir Ahmad – former SNP MSP
- Foysol Choudhury - Labour MSP for Lothian
- Hanzala Malik – Labour MSP for Glasgow
- Humza Yousaf – SNP Member of the Scottish Parliament for Glasgow and First Minister of Scotland
- Kaukab Stewart, SNP MSP for Glasgow Kelvin.

=== Members of the Senedd ===
- Altaf Hussain – former regional Assembly Member in the National Assembly for Wales from 2015 to 2016
- Mohammad Asghar – Welsh politician, representing the Welsh Conservative Party
- Natasha Asghar - Welsh politician, representing the Welsh Conservatives. First female ethnic minority member elected to the Senedd

=== Members of the London Assembly ===
- Hina Bokhari - Liberal Democrat AM
- Marina Ahmad - Labour AM
- Murad Qureshi – Former Labour Greater London Assembly Member
- Sakina Sheikh - Labour AM

=== Mayors ===
- Chauhdry Abdul Rashid – former Lord Mayor of Birmingham
- Lutfur Rahman – Cllr, community activist, local Independent politician; became the first directly elected Mayor of Tower Hamlets in 2010; first Bangladeshi leader of the council
- Mohammed Ajeeb – former Lord Mayor of Bradford; first Asian (Pakistani) Lord Mayor in the UK
- Rokhsana Fiaz – Labour Party politician serving as Mayor of Newham
- Sadiq Khan – elected Mayor of London in May 2016

=== Other ===
- Amjad Bashir – former Conservative MEP for Yorkshire and Humber; former UKIP Small & Medium Business spokesman
- Bashir Khanbhai – former Conservative MEP for East of England
- Benyamin Habib – Brexit Party Member of the European Parliament (MEP) for London since 2019.
- Sajjad Karim former MEP – born in Brierfield, Lancashire; qualified as a solicitor before being elected as a Member of the European Parliament in 2007; Conservative Legal Affairs Spokesman; sits on the Industry, Research and Energy Committee
- Magid Magid – Green Party MEP for Yorkshire and the Humber.
- Shaffaq Mohammed – Liberal Democrats Member of the European Parliament (MEP) for the Yorkshire and the Humber since 2019.
- Mushtaq Ahmad – Lord Lieutenant of Lanarkshire. He was the first Asian to serve as Provost of a Scottish council
- Shahnaz Ali – British Muslim woman known for her leadership role in equality, inclusion and human rights in the National Health Service and local government in England
- Bashir Maan – Pakistani-Scottish politician, businessman and writer
- Munira Mirza – was the Deputy Mayor for Education and Culture of London. Born in Oldham.
- Cllr Nasim Ali – Labour Party politician, councillor in Regent's Park, Cabinet Member for Young People in Camden Council and former Mayor of Camden; in May 2003, at age 34, he became the country's youngest mayor as well as the UK's first Bangladeshi and first Muslim mayor
- Rabina Khan, Cllr – Labour Party politician, councillor in Shadwell, cabinet member for housing in Tower Hamlets London Borough Council, community worker and author of Ayesha's Rainbow
- Salma Yaqoob – former leader of the left-wing Respect Party and a Birmingham City Councillor
- Syeda Amina Khatun MBE – Labour Party councillor for Tipton Green in the Sandwell Metropolitan Borough Council; first Bangladeshi woman to be elected in the Midlands region, in 1999

== Religion ==
- Abdul Qayum – Chief Imam of East London Mosque, television presenter for Peace TV Bangla and Channel S, and former lecturer at International Islamic University Malaysia.
- Sohaib Saeed, Islamic scholar, academic and imam in Scotland
- Aga Khan IV – 9th Imam and Aga Khan of Nizari Ismailism, a denomination of Isma'ilism within Shia Islam with an estimated 10–15 million adherents (10—12% of the world's Shia Muslim population).
- Aga Khan V – 10th Imam and Aga Khan of Nizari Ismailism
- Daud Abdullah – current Deputy Secretary General of the Muslim Council of Britain
- Maajid Nawaz – former member of the Islamic political group Hizb ut-Tahrir, now the co-founder and executive director of Quilliam, the world's first counter-extremism think tank
- Mohammad Naseem – former GP and the chairman of the Birmingham Mosque Trust
- Musharraf Hussain – scientist, educator and religious scholar in Nottinghamshire
- Saleem Sidwai – accountant and Secretary General of the Muslim Council of Wales
- Vilayat Inayat Khan – eldest son of Sufi Murshid Inayat Khan, head of the Sufi Order International
- Zara Mohammed – first Woman Secretary General of the Muslim Council of Britain.

== Science and medicine ==
- Asim Shahmalak – hair transplant surgeon and broadcaster, and proponent of such surgery; in 2009, he performed the UK's first eyelash transplant.
- Ella Al-Shamahi – paleoanthropologist, evolutionary biologist, science communicator and television presenter specializing in the study of Neanderthals.
- Haroon Ahmed – British Pakistani scientist in the fields of microelectronics and electrical engineering.
- Hasnat Khan – heart and lung surgeon who was romantically involved with Diana, Princess of Wales.
- Mayur Lakhani – doctor who works as a general practitioner. He was Chairman of The National Council for Palliative Care 2008–2015.
- Nadia Bukhari – pharmacist and youngest female Fellow of the Royal Pharmaceutical Society; an honour bestowed to those who have achieved excellence and distinction in their pharmacy career.
- Qanta Ahmed – physician specializing in sleep disorders. She is also an author and a newspaper columnist.
- Rozina Ali – microvascular reconstructive plastic surgeon and consultant with a specialist interest in breast reconstruction; television presenter.
- Tipu Zahed Aziz – Professor of neurosurgery at the John Radcliffe Hospital in Oxford; lecturer at Magdalen College, Oxford and Imperial College London medical school.
- Alimuddin Zumla – Director of infectious diseases, University College Hospital, London.

== Sport ==
=== Boxing ===
- Adam Azim - professional boxer
- Adil Anwar – British light-welterweight boxer and multiple title winner
- Adnan Amar – British light-middleweight boxer, multiple title winner
- Amer Khan – former undefeated light-heavyweight boxer, Central Area championship winner
- Amir Khan – British light-welterweight Boxer, 2004 Olympics silver medalist, and former world champion
- Hamzah Sheeraz – British light-middleweight boxer, WBO European title champion
- Haroon Khan – super-flyweight boxer and commonwealth bronze medalist
- Jawaid Khaliq, MBE – first British Asian to win a world title belt
- Muhammad Ali – Olympic boxer
- Nadeem Siddique – former British welterweight boxer, multiple title winner
- Naseem Hamed – former WBO, WBC, IBF, and Lineal featherweight champion, and European bantamweight champion
- Qais Ashfaq – amateur boxer from Leeds and Commonwealth silver medallist
- Tanveer Ahmed – former lightweight boxer, WBO Inter-Continental champion
- Ukashir Farooq – British bantamweight boxer, former British bantamweight title winner
- Usman Ahmed – super flyweight boxer

=== Cricket ===
- Aamer Khan – Pakistani-born former English cricketer
- Aamir Farooque – former Pakistani-born English cricketer
- Adil Rashid – English cricketer who plays for Yorkshire and England Under-19s
- Ajaz Akhtar – former Pakistani people-born English cricketer
- Ajmal Shahzad – cricketer who plays for Yorkshire County Cricket Club and represents England in all three formats of the game
- Akbar Ansari – English first-class and List A cricketer who played his First-class games for Cambridge University Cricket Club and Cambridge University Centre of Cricketing Excellence, and List A cricket for Marylebone Cricket Club
- Alamgir Sheriyar – cricketer whoplays for Leicestershire
- Amjad Khan – cricketer for England International and the youngest to play for the Danish national team
- Aquib Afzaal – left-handed batsman who bowls right-arm off break
- Asim Butt – Scottish and Pakistani cricketer who was primarily a left-arm medium fast bowler
- Bilal Shafayat – cricketer
- Hamza Riazuddin – English cricketer, right-handed lower-order batsman and a right-arm medium-fast bowler who plays for Hampshire
- Imraan Mohammad – English cricketer, right-handed batsman who bowls right-arm off break
- Imran Arif – Pakistani-born English cricketer; fast-medium bowler; plays for Worcestershire County Cricket Club
- Imran Jamshed – former Pakistani-born English cricketer; right-handed batsman who bowled right-arm medium pace
- Jahid Ahmed – cricketer who played country cricket for Essex as a right-handed lower order batsman and a right-arm medium-pace bowler
- Kabir Ali – English cricketer, who formerly played for Worcestershire
- Kadeer Ali – cricketer playing for Worcestershire; related to Kabir Ali
- Kamran Afzaal – Pakistani-born English cricketer; right-handed batsman
- Majid Haq – Scottish cricket player
- Maneer Mirza – English cricketer; right-arm fast-medium bowler and right-handed batsman who played for Worcestershire
- Moeen Ali – English cricketer; right arm off break bowler and left-handed batsman currently playing for Worcestershire
- Mohammad Akhtar – Pakistani-born English cricketer; right-handed batsman who bowls right-arm off break
- Moneeb Iqbal – Scottish cricketer; right-handed batsman and leg-break bowler
- Nadeem Malik – English cricketer; right-arm fast-medium seam bowler and right-handed lower-order batsman
- Nadeem Shahid – former English first-class cricketer who played for Essex and Surrey
- Naheem Sajjad – Pakistani-born English cricketer, a right-handed batsman who bowls left-arm fast-medium
- Naqaash Tahir – English cricketer; right-arm fast-medium bowler who has played for Lancashire and Warwickshire
- Nasser Hussain – former captain of England cricket team
- Omer Hussain – left-handed batsman; cousin of fellow Scottish international cricketer Majid Haq
- Owais Shah – cricketer who plays for Middlesex and has appeared for England in a number of One Day Internationals and two Test matches
- Qasim Sheikh – Scottish cricketer; has represented Scotland on more than 20 occasions
- Rashid Shafayat – former English cricketer
- Rawait Khan – former English cricketer who played for Derbyshire, Derbyshire CB, and Pakistan Customs in a four-year first-class career which saw him bowl mostly in Second XI Championship matches
- Rehan Alikhan – English-born former cricketer of Pakistani descent; right-handed batsman and off-break bowler
- Sajid Mahmood – Punjabi origin cricketer who plays international cricket for England and county cricket for Lancashire
- Saleem Mohammed – former English cricketer; right-handed batsman
- Shaftab Khalid – English cricketer; right-arm off-spinner who also bats right-handed
- Shammi Iqbal – English cricketer; right-handed batsman who bowls right-arm medium pace
- Usman Afzaal – cricketer who has played three Test matches for England
- Waqar Mohammad – former Pakistani-born English cricketer; right-handed batsman who bowled leg break
- Wasim Khan MBE – first British-born Pakistani to play professional cricket in England; a talented left-handed batsman who also bowled right-arm medium pace
- Zafar Ansari – English cricketer who plays for Cambridge University and Surrey County Cricket Club
- Zoheb Sharif – left-handed batsman and a leg-break bowler

=== Football ===
- Abbas Farid – freestyle footballer from Newport, South Wales; named the "Freestyle King" on MTV in UK's Nike Freestyle competition
- Adam Docker – footballer, playing for Porthmadog F.C.
- Adil Nabi – footballer who plays as a forward for West Bromwich Albion
- Adnan Ahmed – footballer, playing for Tranmere Rovers
- Amjad Iqbal – footballer, playing for Farsley Celtic F.C.
- Anwar Uddin – professional footballer who plays as a defender; after joining Dagenham and Redbridge he became first British Asian to captain a side in the top four divisions; plays for Sutton United
- Atif Bashir – footballer with a British Pakistani father and a Turkish mother
- Easah Suliman – footballer currently playing for Aston Villa. Suliman has represented England at youth level; first player of Asian heritage to captain an England representative side, having done so at Under-16, Under-17 and Under-19 levels.
- Iltaf Ahmed – British Pakistani footballer who was the number one goalkeeper of Pakistan national football team
- Hamza Choudhury – British footballer of Bangladeshi and Afro-Caribbean origin
- Kashif Siddiqi – English-born Pakistani footballer
- Omar Kader – Scottish footballer who plays as a midfielder for Arbroath
- Otis Khan – footballer who plays as a midfielder for Matlock Town on loan FROM Sheffield United
- Rachid Harkouk, Footballer of Algerian origin
- Reis Ashraf – English-born Pakistani international footballer who plays for Buckingham Town in the United Counties League Division One
- Shabir Khan – English-Pakistani international footballer who plays for Worcester City, having progressed through their youth system
- Shahed Ahmed – former professional footballer who played as a striker for Wycombe Wanderers He plays for Sporting Bengal United.
- Tahmina Begum – football referee and PE assistant; in 2010, she became the first qualified female referee of Bangladeshi descent in the UK
- Usman Gondal – retired British-born Pakistani international footballer; retired in 2007
- Zeeshan Rehman – football defender for Queens Park Rangers F.C.; first Pakistani and British Asian to play in the Premiership with Fulham F.C.
- Zidane Iqbal - professional footballer who plays as a midfielder for Manchester United U23

=== Martial arts ===
- Qasim Beg – undefeated kickboxing champion, two-time world champion
- Imran Khan – two-time World Muay Thai champion
- Kamal Shalorus – professional UFC fighter
- Lutalo Muhammad – Taekwondo athlete
- Nisar Smiler – two-time karate world champion and 50-time gold medallist
- Ruqsana Begum – Muay Thai kickboxer; in 2010, became the current British female Atomweight (48–50 kg) Muay Thai boxing champion; in September 2012, she was nominated as captain of the British Muay Thai Team
- Ali Jacko – world champion kickboxer from east London
- Riaz Amin – Britain's youngest WEKAF (World Eskrima/Kali/Arnis Federation) world champion; practises Shotokan Karate and Filipino martial arts

=== Other ===
- Aadel Kardooni – former Leicester Tigers and England A rugby player
- Abdi Jama – wheelchair basketball player, selected to play for Team GB in the 2012 Summer Paralympics in London
- Adam Khan – racing driver from Bridlington, Yorkshire; represents Pakistan in the A1 Grand Prix series; demonstration driver for the Renault F1 racing team
- Adam Gemili – sprinter of Iranian and Moroccan heritage
- Aamir Ghaffar – English badminton player
- Bulbul Hussain – wheelchair rugby player; plays mostly in a defensive role for Kent Crusaders and the Great Britain paralympic team; in 2008 and 2012, he played for Great Britain at the Paralympic Games
- Enaam Ahmed – British F3 racing driver, series' youngest-ever champion at 17 years old
- Gaz Choudhry – wheelchair basketball player who was selected to play for Paralympics GB in the 2012 Summer Paralympics in London
- Hiddy Jahan – squash player who was ranked among the top-6 players in the world from 1970 through to 1986
- Ikram Butt – former professional rugby league footballer; first south Asian to play either code of international rugby for England, in 1995; founder of the British Asian Rugby Association and the British Pakistani rugby league team
- Imran Majid – professional British pool player
- Imran Sherwani – former English field hockey player; was capped 45 times for Great Britain and 49 times for England
- Kamran Panjavi – weightlifter at the 2004 Summer Olympics
- Mo Farah – runner and four-time Olympic gold medallist
- Mukhtar Mohammed – Somali-born British middle-distance athlete specialising in the 800 metres
- Shokat Ali – English snooker player of Pakistani descent; represents Pakistan in international tournaments
- Hammad Miah – British snooker player
- Zubair Hoque – British single-seat racecar driver

== Other ==
- Amal Azzudin – Scottish human rights activist
- Basil Al Bayati – architect, designer and writer; leading proponent of the school of Metaphoric Architecture
- Asif Ahmad – British diplomat, serving as the British ambassador to the Republic of the Philippines
- Dr Humayra Abedin – National Health Service doctor of medicine who became a cause célèbre after her parents tried to force her into marriage and held her captive until freed by court order in 2008
- Hussain Bisad – one of the tallest men in the world, at 2.32 m (7 ft 7 1/2 in)
- Robina Qureshi – Scottish human rights campaigner
- Ruhal Ahmed – former Guantanamo Bay detainee depicted in the film The Road to Guantanamo
- Saiman Miah – architecture student who designed the £5 coins for the 2012 London Summer Olympics
- Sahil Saeed – boy kidnapped in Pakistan in 2010; released unharmed after the payment of a ransom
- Shabina Begum – was involved in the leading House of Lords case UKHL 15 R (Begum) v Governors of Denbigh High School (2006) on the legal regulation of religious symbols and dress under the Human Rights Act 1998

== See also ==
- Islam in the United Kingdom
- Islam in England
- Islam in Northern Ireland
- Islam in Scotland
- Islam in Wales
- Religion in the United Kingdom
- List of American Muslims
- List of Canadian Muslims
