= Sanchita =

Sanchita is a given name. Notable people with the name include:

- Sanchita Islam (born 1973), English artist, writer and filmmaker
- Sanchita Padukone (born 1988), Indian actress
- Sanchita Shetty (born 1989), Indian actress
- Sanchita Bhattacharya (born 1992), Indian playback singer
