= Asad Qureshi =

Asad Qureshi may refer to:

- Asad Qureshi, British-Pakistani filmmaker kidnapped in 2010, see kidnapping of Asad Qureshi
- Asad Qureshi (producer), Pakistani film and television producer
