= Asian Tigers =

Asian Tigers may refer to:

- Four Asian Tigers, an economic group comprising Hong Kong, Singapore, South Korea, and Taiwan
- Asian Tigers (militant group), a Pakistani organization
- The mainland Asian tiger subspecies, Panthera tigris tigris.
