= Khalid Khawaja =

Former Pakistan Air Force pilot

Squadron Leader Colonel Khalid Khawaja
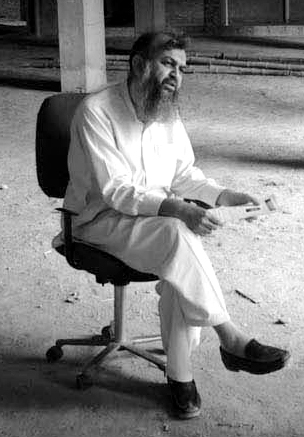
- Khawaja in c. 2006
- Born: 3 July 1951; Jaranwala, Punjab province
- Died: April 30, 2010 (aged 58-59); Mirali, North Waziristan, Federally Administered Tribal Areas (FATA)
- Cause of death: Assassination (gunshot wounds)
- Burial place: H-11 graveyard, Islamabad, Pakistan
- Military career
- Allegiance: Pakistan
- Branch: Pakistan Armed Forces; Pakistan Air Force; Special Service Wing (SSW); Inter Services Intelligence (ISI)
- Service years: 1971–1986
- Rank: Squadron Leader
- Nickname: Colonel Khawaja
- Units: 16 Squadron Panthers; 26 Squadron Black Spiders
- Conflicts: Indo-Pakistani wars; 1971 Indo-Pakistan War; Afghan conflict; Soviet-Afghan War; Lal Masjid Conflict (POW)

Squadron leader Colonel Khalid Khawaja (Urdu: خالد خواجہ; 3 July 1951 – April 30, 2010) was Pakistani fighter pilot and intelligence officer-turned human rights activist, who served as the Squadron leader of Pakistan Air Force's No. 16 Squadron Panthers, and was also associated with both the Special Service Wing (SSW) and the Inter-Services Intelligence (ISI).

As Squadron Leader, he led several combat missions against the Indian Air Force during the Indo-Pakistan War of 1971, commanding Pakistan Air Force's elite No. 26 Squadron and later the No. 16 Squadron Panthers.

A veteran of Soviet–Afghan War, Khawaja described himself as a close associate of Osama bin Laden in the early days of the Afghan resistance against the Soviet Union. He was also described as having close ties to Abdul Rashid Ghazi, the leader of the Lal Masjid.

He was also the co-founder and spokesperson for the Defence of Human Rights Pakistan (DHR), a human rights organization led by Abdul Rashid Ghazi.

He was assassinated on April 30, 2010 in the North Waziristan town of Mir Ali.

== Military career ==
Khawaja gained commission in Pakistan Air Force in January 1970. He completed his aviation training to become an aviator of Alouette III, and was selected to be sent to PAF Special Warfare School.

Upon graduation in June 1971, Khawaja was commissioned as a flying officer and selected for flight training.

During the Indo-Pakistan War of 1971, he led several combat missions against the Indian Air Force, commanding Pakistan Air Force's elite No. 26 Squadron, aided by the army's elite Special Service Group .

In 1985, he was assigned to the Special Service Wing (SSW) and later to the Inter-Services Intelligence (ISI). During his time, he also became involved in operations supporting the Afghan mujahideen against Soviet forces in the Soviet–Afghan War. He later claimed to have met prominent figures including Osama bin Laden, Jalaluddin Haqqani, and Mullah Omar.

In 1987, President and Chief of Army Staff General Zia-ul-Haq dismissed him from his position. The official reason cited was his "outspoken views." Subsequently, the Judge Advocate General Branch of the Pakistan Army issued him a forced retirement.

== Defense of Human Rights Pakistan ==
Khawaja was a close friend of Lal Masjid's Abdul Rashid Ghazi and was the co-founder of the rights group "Defense of Human Rights Pakistan" (Urdu: تحافظ حقوق إنساني), Khawaja served as the organization's spokesman while Ghazi was the first chairman. The Associated Press also named Khawaja as a spokesman for a Pakistani human rights group named Defense of Human Rights.

=== Molly Campbell ===
Khawaja and Ghazi both also became involved in the recovery case of alleged child abduction victim Molly Campbell, providing her shelter at the Jamia Hafsa during her parental custody trial.

=== The Khadr family ===
Khawaja was also a noted friend of the Egyptian-Canadian Khadr family, Khawaja spoke in their defense saying they were being unfairly targeted by Canadian authorities because of deference to the United States and Islamophobia. He has also said that Canada is "selfish and self-centered" and deserves to be bombed by terrorists.

Deborah Scroggins, author of the book Wanted Women: Faith, Lies & The War on Terror: The lives of Ayaan Hirsi Ali & Aaafia Siddiqui, describes meeting Zaynab while she was a house-guest of Khawaja, in Islamabad, Pakistan, in 2004.

== Asia Times comments ==
We don't believe in killing innocent people, but we would certainly like to send you into the Stone Age the same way you have sent us into the Stone Age...a slave normally hates his master

— Khalid Khawaja, 2005

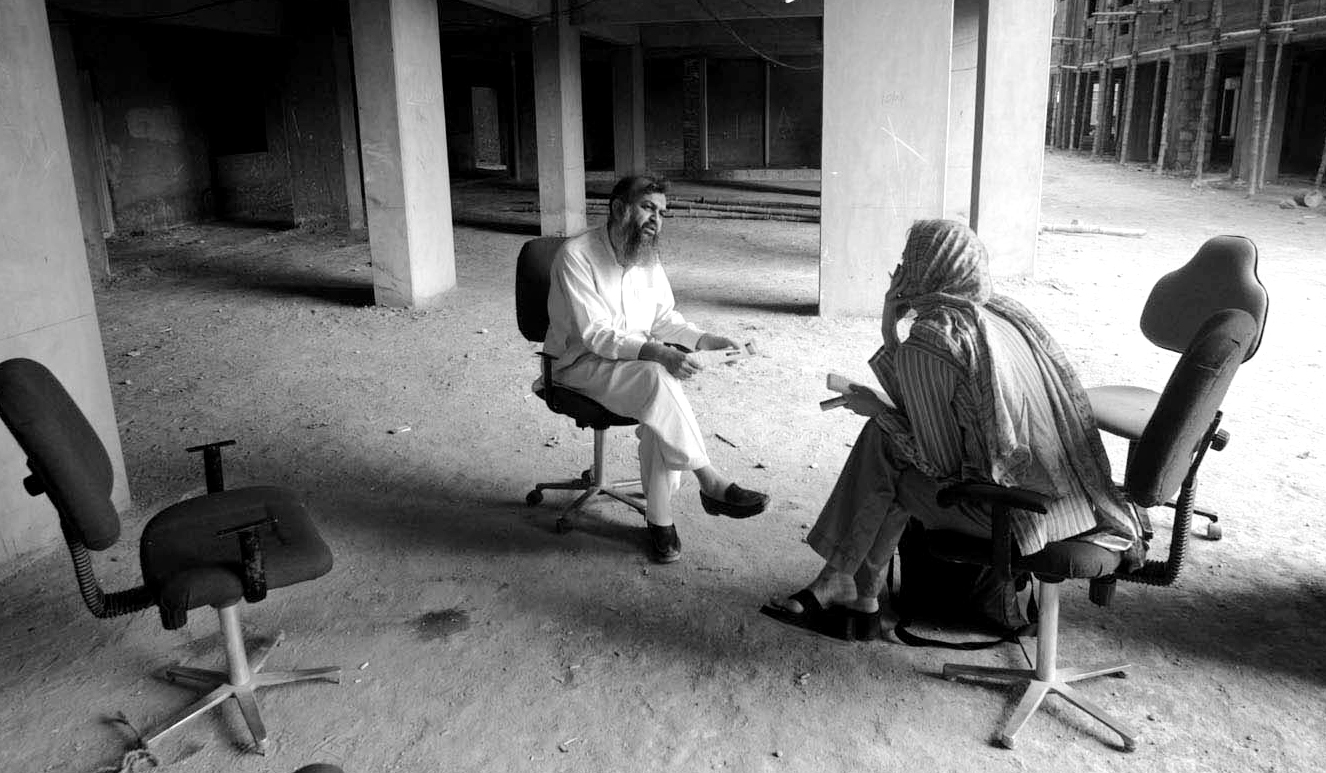
Michelle Shephard during an interview with Khalid Khawaja in Karachi, Pakistan.

A November 9, 2005, article in the Asia Times described Khawaja as the "point man" for Mansoor Ijaz, which it describes as "...a US citizen of Pakistani origin with close ties to the Republican Party".

The Asia Times says that Ijaz is negotiating a peace with the remaining elements of the Taliban, with Khawaja's assistance.

== Lal Masjid Standoff ==
In January 2007, Lal Masjid's imam, Abdul Aziz, and his wife, Umme Hassan, launched a campaign to enforce their interpretation of Sharia law. The campaign involved the seizure of a children's library and vigilante actions against activities they deemed "un-Islamic," leading to a standoff with the Pakistani government. During the crisis, Aziz's brother, Abdul Rashid Ghazi, who was also involved in the mosque's leadership, enlisted their mutual friend Khawaja to mediate and persuade Aziz to end the standoff and vacate the library. Khawaja's mediation efforts, however, were unsuccessful.

Khawaja was arrested In February 2007 outside the Lal Masjid in Islamabad. The initial charges against him were under Section 295-A of the Pakistan Penal Code for allegedly distributing inflammatory material, accusations he publicly denied and told the court that "intelligence officials" had apprehended him outside his house, covering his face with cloth and forcing him into a vehicle. After months of pressure and court petitions, he was finally released on June 23, 2007.

On July 4, 2007, the day after the Pakistani military's siege of the Lal Masjid began, he was rearrested. The police, citing a First Information Report (FIR) that linked him to the event, claimed an eyewitness had seen him firing from the mosque and requested a ten-day physical remand for investigation. Khawaja denied the charges, stating he was not present at the mosque during the shootout. A judicial magistrate authorized a seven-day physical remand; however, the Supreme Court of Pakistan subsequently intervened and ordered his release from Adiala Jail.

== Assassination ==
On March 31, 2010, Khawaja was abducted from the outskirts of a city in Waziristan in the Khyber Pakhtunkhwa province of Pakistan by unidentified gunmen. He was in the region with fellow former official Colonel Imam and journalist Asad Qureshi. Days after his disappearance, a previously unknown group calling itself "Asian Tigers" claimed responsibility for his capture.

After a weeks-long captivity, on April 30, 2010, Khawaja's body was found in North Waziristan town of Mir Ali, He had been shot dead and a note was attached to it, reiterating the accusations of spying.

Khawaja was buried at the H-11 graveyard in Islamabad and Maulana Abdul Aziz, the imam of Lal Masjid, led his funeral prayers and later eulogized him in an interview as "a person who always fought for his religion."
