= Classic Car Rescue =

- Title card featuring the 1969 Jaguar E-Type Series 2
- Presented by: Bernie Fineman; Mario Pacione
- Narrated by: John Thomson
- Countries of origin: United Kingdom; Canada
- Original language: English
- No. of series: 2
- No. of episodes: 14

Production
- Running time: 45 minutes
- Production company: Blink Films

Original release
- Network: Channel 5 (UK); Discovery Networks affiliates (International)
- Release: 24 September 2012 – 9 June 2014

Classic Car Rescue is a British/Canadian reality television series produced by Blink Films and aired on Channel 5 for six weeks in 2012, as well as on Discovery Networks affiliates in international markets.

Each one-hour episode documents the work of Cockney mechanic Bernie Fineman and his Italian Canadian business partner Mario Pacione, as they purchase "shameful rust bucket" classic cars from scrapheaps, barns, and backyards and restore them to their former, or to new, glories. Having bought the "bargain wrecks," the pair must then source the parts needed to return the cars to the shiny, desirable motors they once were. At the end of each episode, the cars are appraised by an automotive valuer before being given away in a viewer competition. The programme returned with a second series in 2014, running for eight weeks.

== Episodes ==
=== Series 1 ===
Episode	Date	Car	Description	Ratings
1	24 September 2012	1969 Jaguar E-Type Series 2	In the first episode, Bernie and Mario have to restore an E-Type in four weeks. After the first potential purchase, a U.S.-spec 2+2, proves too expensive at £14,000, Bernie buys a different U.S.-spec Series 2 2+2 with an automatic transmission for £12,000. This annoys Mario, as they had agreed not to spend over £10,000. Along with the mechanical and aesthetic restorations, the car is resprayed from its original white to Signal Red, despite Mario accidentally damaging the right rear wing when he backs the car up and hits an engine. A brand-new aftermarket sunroof is installed to fill the void left by the previous non-original modification. The original U.S.-spec bumpers are retained. Dylan Miles, a valuer from RM Auctions appraises the finished car at £30,000, giving them a profit of £9,600.	1.11m
2	1 October 2012	1977 Porsche 911	The second episode sees Bernie and Mario agree to restore a Porsche 911. The first one they find turns out to be completely stripped, so it is rejected. They settle on their second find, an incomplete silver 1977 model that they buy for £6,900. While the car is being stripped for painting, the mechanics suspect that it is a "cut and shut" due to the amounts of filler used above the firewall and the dodgy repair work on the roof, but this is debunked upon further inspection by Mario. After most of the mechanical work is done, the car is repainted Signal Orange, similar to an original colour that Porsche offered in the 1970s, and is fitted with a whale tail and a bespoke interior. Despite a dirty engine bay and some paint chips on the driver's side door frame, the finished car is valued at £22,000, giving them a profit of £8,100.	0.82m
3	8 October 2012	1976 MGB GT	In this episode, Bernie and Mario go out to hunt down an MGB. They visit a collector who offers a rubber bumper B GT, but they reject the offer, as the car has been disassembled and it is unknown if all of the parts are intact. Bernie then visits a farmer who owns a barn filled with classic cars, including an Inca Yellow 1976 B GT. After much argument between Bernie and the farmer over the car's rotting state and the £800 asking price, Mario negotiates with the farmer over the phone and agrees to buy it for £500. Despite numerous mishaps including the rear suspension falling off the car lift and Bernie sacking the mechanics before rehiring them, the two-week restoration sees the car repainted in medium British racing green and have a chrome bumper conversion. The chrome grille chosen is of the 'honeycomb' style. The original fabric sunroof is also filled in. The finished car is valued at £5,000, giving them a profit of £1,600.	1.13m
4	15 October 2012	1969 Ford Mustang Convertible	In this episode, Bernie travels to Mario's hometown of Toronto, Canada, to find a muscle car to restore. After considering a Chevrolet Nova, they decide to restore a Mustang. Their first find does not suit their budget, but Mario finds a 1969 convertible which already has a coat of primer applied, despite being in pieces and its engine is beyond saving. After the owner shows him a detailed report of the car's manufacture history and a reprint of the original factory sticker, as well as proof that the car is the only one to have been fitted with an electric clock, Mario buys it for CDN$5,000, which annoys Bernie as a convertible would be harder to restore than a hardtop. It is also discovered that most of the undercarriage is completely rusted out. During the restoration period, Mario accidentally drops the windscreen while handling it by himself, forcing the duo to hunt for a replacement. He is also forced to spend an extra CDN$1,700 to buy the 302 cid engine from the first find and have it rebuilt to replace the car's dead motor. Tensions further arise when the mechanics quit after Bernie blows up on them over an accidental engine fire. Nevertheless, the three-week restoration gets underway and the completed car is finished in Grabber Blue and has Boss 302 decals applied, as well as a matching rear spoiler installed. Despite having a misaligned bonnet and right-side door, the finished car is valued at CDN$29,000, giving them a profit of CDN$10,000 (roughly £6,500).	1.11m
5	22 October 2012	1954 Cadillac Coupe De Ville	While still in Canada, Bernie and Mario search for a classic Cadillac and visit the home of millionaire Steve Plunkett, whose Cadillac collection is worth at least £10 million. The tour inspires them to hunt down a 1950s model. After the duo pass on a rusted Cadillac limousine (which may fetch a lot of money, but will cost too much to restore), Mario spends CDN$6,500 for a 1954 Cadillac Coupe De Ville that has been rusting in a barn and accommodating a family of mice for many years. The duo restores the car within a one-month window, during which, it is repainted from yellow to Argent Silver with a black roof (although Mario accidentally has it painted in an unattractive grey beforehand) and a green/grey interior. The finished car is valued at CDN$25,000, which gives them a profit of CDN$9,000 (roughly £6,000).	1.29m
6	29 October 2012	1975 Morris Mini 1000	Returning to the UK, Bernie and Mario set out to restore a Mini. After purchasing a blue 1975 Morris Mini 1000 and an original Morris Mini Minor owner's manual for £720, Bernie decides to restore the car in under one week, despite the copious amounts of rust and the engine running on only three cylinders. Various incidents occur as a result of Bernie's "traditional" approach, including a fire during some work on the floor panel. Bernie makes a deal with a local Mini specialist for some brightwork and new suspension trumpets. The car is repainted blue with white roof and racing stripes, and is fitted with a new exhaust system and grille-mounted fog lights. The car is examined and declared to have a value of £5,000 - a profit of £1,680.	1.36m

=== Series 2 ===
Episode	Date	Car	Description	Ratings
2/1	14 April 2014	Porsche 928 GT	In the first episode of series 2, Bernie and Mario look for a Porsche 928 to restore in three weeks. Because over 80% of all 928s sold in the UK were automatic, the manual version is rarer and can fetch more money. After struggling to find one in working condition, the duo buy a black 1991 928 GT at a specialist garage for £5,000, despite the car missing half of its interior and in need of a new paint job. The Porsche's arrival at the workshop is met with enthusiasm from the mechanics, and despite Bernie's cynicism toward the time window and the £7,000 restoration budget given by Mario, Dan'l, the lead mechanic, agrees on a £50 bet with Bernie that his team can do the job on time. The initial assessment shows that the 928 needs an engine service, new brakes, body repair and a full respray, but while the team flexes their muscles on loosening the aged bolts, Mario has difficulty finding new seats until he decides to buy them off a unit the duo previously walked out on for £250. Consequently, it takes two weeks to have the white leather seats refurbished and re-upholstered. As the 928 is being resprayed, the workshop suffers a power outage, forcing the team to re-sand and redo the paint job the next day. After the Porsche's faulty immobiliser jams the central locking system and locks Mario inside, an electrical specialist is called upon to fix the complex wiring. Once the engine is serviced, Bernie takes the 928 to a rolling road, where it is rated at 343.2 bhp at the flywheel. Despite blowing their £7,000 budget, the team manages to restore the 928 in time for classic car expert and former racing driver Paul O'Neil to test it and appraise its value. Before Paul gets a chance to do a top speed test, the car suddenly sprays water all over the engine bay due to a faulty water hose. Following the engine fix, the car is valued at £13,000 - a profit of £700.	
2/2	21 April 2014	Fiat 500	Mario travels to Milan, Italy, on the search for a Fiat 500 as his and Bernie's next project car. However, Bernie buys a non-running 1973 unit back in the UK for £1,500 against Mario's advice. Mario gives the team two weeks and a budget of £6,000 to restore the car. Once Bernie gets the engine running, he has an engine specialist polish and port the cylinder head and install a new carburettor for a 6 bhp increase and £2,000, promptly infuriating Mario. Because of this expense, Mario is forced to cancel his plans to re-upholster the seats to leather. The body is mended of all rusty spots and repainted from red to ivory. Tempers continue to flare when Bernie has difficulty starting the engine; once it manages to start, it smokes oil all over the shop due to a faulty oil pressure switch seal. Due to the engine upgrade, the restoration goes £1,000 over its budget. The new Guards Red seats, roof, and interior trim are installed, as well as the brightwork and new wheels before the car is given to Paul for testing. The 500 fails an uphill test due to a worn clutch. The car is valued at £8,900 - a profit of £400.	
2/3	28 Apr 2014	Mercedes Benz 450 SL	Mario and Bernie set their sights on buying and restoring a Mercedes-Benz R107 380 SL. The duo spot a rusty burgundy 1986 SL on an online auction and Mario buys it for £1,250 before Bernie even finishes assessing it. Mario gives the team four weeks and a £12,000 budget to bring the SL back in shape. Bernie gets the engine running after replacing the fuel pump, but discovers that the gearbox is shot. Nick, one of the mechanics, reconnects the gear stick to the gearbox, saving the team valuable time and money. However, Bernie discovers that the bulkhead is completely rotten, forcing the team to scrap it. As a means of retribution, Mario buys a green SL for £3,000 as the new project car, which has an intact bulkhead but as much body rust as the first car. Combining the best parts of both cars, the team gives the SL an engine service and a body respray to metallic green. When Mario backs the car out of the spray booth, the exhaust falls off its mountings; during the argument, Mario damages the paint job. Desperate for a profit, Mario sells the scrapped SL for £1,400. The SL is fitted with a new custom exhaust, refurbished interior, and all of its brightwork. In the end, Paul appraises the SL's value at £13,800 - a loss of £350.	
2/4	12 May 2014	Volkswagen Camper	In this episode, Mario and Bernie return to Toronto to hunt down and restore a Volkswagen Camper - particularly the pre-1968 split screen model. After finding no luck at a breakers' yard, Bernie flies home while Mario continues his search. He finds a green 1966 Camper that needs body work and a new interior, and pays CDN$7,500 (roughly £4,000). Mario gives the team four weeks and a budget of £10,000 to restore the Camper. The team is not amused by the amount of rust all over the vehicle. An arriving Bernie is further infuriated when he discover that the steering kingpins are worn out. Sat, one of the mechanics, suggests a disc brake conversion while working on the steering system. Mario buys an abandoned 1979 Porsche 911 project car for £3,500 for its disc brakes and new calipers. During the teardown, the team discovers that the entire interior and the spare side doors are completely unusable. Bernie and apprentice Tammy remove the engine for rebuilding before the body is shipped for sodablasting. Once the body returns to the shop, the team cracks on to replace all of the rotten steel panels. Diego, the head mechanic, attempts to loosen a seized rear wheel hub with a blowtorch, but tempers flare between Bernie and Diego and Sat when the wheel hub begins to smoke. After managing to remove the seized hub, the team installs the new front disc brakes and fills up the bodywork. Diego, having a background in kitchen design, comes up with a new interior design for the Camper. Mario manages to score two working side doors in exchange for the Porsche he bought. The Camper is then given a full body respray to a white and blue colour scheme, but during reassembly, Diego accidentally dents the front end. The team races to fix and respray the damaged panel. Paul appraises the Camper's value at £21,200 - a profit of £5,100.	
2/5	19 May 2014	DeLorean	While in Toronto, Mario and Bernie look for a 1981 DeLorean to restore. After turning down a wrecked unit, the duo head to a barn to check out another DeLorean, only to discover that it is painted red over its stainless steel body, the engine does not start, and it is fitted with non-original wheels. Nonetheless, Mario buys it for CDN$9,500 (roughly £5,100). Upon the car's arrival at the garage, the team discovers other faults such as a right door with a faulty gas strut, seized brakes, and a rusty steel frame. Adding to the pressure is Mario's three-week time window coupled with a £5,000 budget. Since DeLorean parts are hard to come by, Mario substitutes the old radiator with a slightly longer Jeep unit. The team uses chemical paint stripper to remove the red paint without damaging the stainless steel grain pattern. During this process, the left wing is discovered to have layers of filler. Mario flies to the DMC factory in Texas to purchase new parts and a refurbished left wing. While the team assesses the right door, it slams shut when a pipe supporting it falls off, shattering the window in the process. The team mends the rusty frame, replaces the brakes and shock absorbers, and does a full engine service. Mario and Bernie take the uncompleted DeLorean on a test drive when the engine suddenly overheats due to the faulty Jeep radiator, forcing Mario to order an original unit. Once the new windscreen, right side window, and left wing are installed and all the trimming refitted, the DeLorean is given to Paul for his test drive and appraisal. The car is valued at £13,400 - a profit of £2,000.	
2/6	27 May 2014	Ferrari Mondial 8	Bernie and Mario argue about buying a Ferrari Mondial 8 to restore. As a means to convince Bernie of the value of restoring Ferraris, he takes him to a Ferrari festival at Spa Grand Prix Circuit in Belgium. There, the duo are introduced to a blue Mondial wrapped in black and red body vinyl as a former track car before buying it for €10,000 (roughly £8,500). Once the Mondial arrives at the workshop, it suffers an electrical problem and the team discovers rust all over the undercarriage. The team is given four weeks and a budget of £10,000 to bring the Mondial back into shape. After all of the body vinyl is stripped, the Mondial reveals more rot and corrosion on its body panels. The rusted front crossmember is replaced with a new steel bar. While Bernie inspects the electricals, the faulty wiring causes a small fire in the trunk. No longer trusting Bernie's mechanical skills, Mario secretly brings in Mario 2, a Ferrari expert, to work on the Mondial, further infuriating Bernie. Leaving Mario 2 to mend the Mondial, Bernie goes out to buy some second-hand parts from a Ferrari specialist. Bernie conducts a ballot on what colour to paint the Mondial and leaves Dan'l to pick the winning vote; the car comes out in light metallic blue, much to the chagrin of Bernie, who wanted the car's original colour. Dan'l brings it back to the spray booth and resprays it as ordered. Because the original wheels use metric-size tyres, Mario grabs another set of second-hand wheels that are scratched up. With no time left to restore them, the team installs the wheels along with the final rebuild before the Mondial is tested by Paul. The car is valued at £16,800 - a loss of £1,000.	
2/7	2 June 2014	Volkswagen Beetle	Bernie and Mario choose the Volkswagen Beetle as their next restoration project. They purchase a rusty blue 1974 Beetle from a car restorer for £450. Mario sets a restoration timeframe of three weeks and a budget of £3,000, which is later on raised to £9,000. Upon the car's arrival at the workshop, the team discovers that the floor panel and front end are rotten. The team waste no time on cutting all the rust and welding new panels. Bernie is keen on keeping the Beetle stock, but Mario sees a larger profit from customising it. Mario purchases a Subaru Impreza for £800 with the intent of transplanting its 2.0 litre flat-4 engine into the Beetle, much to the chagrin of Bernie. The team shoehorns the engine after fitting an adaptor plate and cutting part of the rear end. The Beetle's interior is painted red before the engine and radiator are fully installed, but when Mario fires it up for the first time and does a short burnout, the splines of the old wheel hubs quickly wear off, requiring a new set. Before the new hubs arrive, the team paints the Beetle in Porsche Blood Orange and fits a roll cage, aluminium door panels and floor boards. Mario brings in a pair of Porsche leather seats, but as they are motorised and require additional electrical connections, he is forced to buy another set of racing seats. Paul's testing of the Beetle involves a drag race with a stock Beetle to test its 120 bhp Subaru engine. The car is valued at £11,300 - a loss of £5,100.	
2/8	9 June 2014	Chevrolet Corvette C3 Stingray	Returning to Toronto, Mario and Bernie set their sights on restoring a Corvette C3 Stingray. The duo find a partially restored blue 1973 Stingray with layers of filler on its fibreglass body, missing trim, electrical issues, and a misfiring engine. Despite Bernie's objections, Mario buys it for CDN$14,000 (roughly £7,500). Enthusiasm at the garage turns into disappointment when the team discovers multiple cracks on the bodywork, rusted doors, and a faulty headlamp mechanism, and Mario gives them three weeks and a £4,600 budget to bring it back to form. Bernie and Diego correct the misfiring problem by rearranging the distributor wiring in the proper sequence. Seeing that the headlamp mechanism and power brakes run on vacuum pressure generated by the engine, the team decides to separate the body from the chassis to dig deeper into the engine. Mario discovers that the body's original colour is yellow metallic and decides to have it resprayed as such. Diego constructs a wooden frame to support the body during the separation process, but once it is lifted, the left quarter panel splits open. Upon further inspection, the team discovers that the engine is completely aftermarket. Mario proposes to sell the engine and buy a completely original unit, much to Bernie's chagrin. While the team carries on with the bodywork and the aftermarket engine, Mario locates the Corvette's original engine and purchases it for CDN$750 (roughly £400). Tensions flare up when Bernie realizes Mario was talking to Sat about rebuilding the engine behind his back. After the arguments settle down, the team manages to bring the old engine back to life while the repaired body is primered before being lowered back on the chassis. All electricals and panels are reinstalled before the Corvette is resprayed in yellow metallic, but upon its return to the garage, the engine once again cannot start due to dirt in the carburettor. Diego tries to clean off the dirt by revving the engine, but his method causes the right muffler to explode and damage the bodywork. The team races against time to repair the body panel, replace the muffler, and install the restored interior. Once Paul takes the Corvette for a test drive, he values it at £15,400 - a profit of £1,700.	

== Reception ==
James Ruppert of Autocar wrote a scathing review on the TV series, criticising Fineman as a "big fat bully making a drama out of a manufactured crisis."
