= Colonel Imam =

Pakistani Army officer and diplomat (1944-2011)

Brigadier General Amir Sultan Tarar SJ
- کرنل امام
- Amir Sultan Tarar in c. 2009

Personal details
- Born: Amir Sultan Tarar; 4 April 1944 Chattal, Chakwal District, Punjab, British India
- Died: 23 January 2011 (aged 66) Mir Ali, North Waziristan, FATA, Pakistan
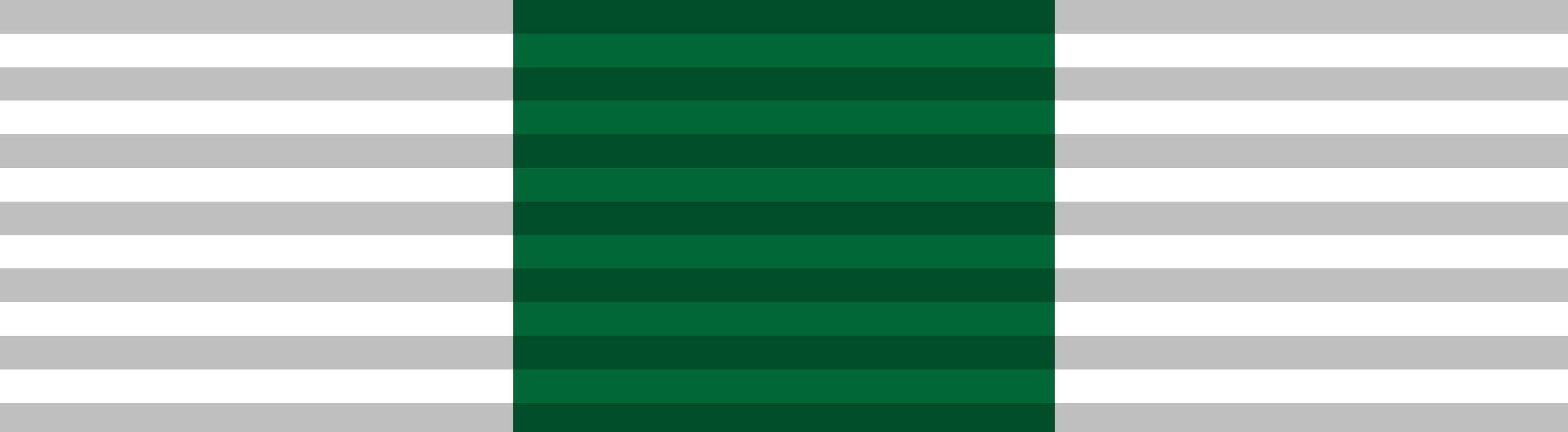
- Awards: Sitara-e-Jurat
- Nickname: Colonel Imam

Military service
- Allegiance: Pakistan
- Branch/service: Pakistan Army
- Years of service: 1966–1994
- Rank: Brigadier General
- Unit: 14/13 Frontier Force Regiment
- Commands: CO Parachute Training School
- Battles/wars: Indo-Pakistani War of 1971; Afghan conflict; Soviet–Afghan War; First Afghan Civil War; Second Afghan Civil War; Third Afghan Civil War

Amir Sultan Tarar (Note: Urdu: عامر سلطان تارڑ, romanized: ʿĀmir Sulṭān Tāraṛ) (4 April 1944 – 23 January 2011), commonly known by the nom de guerre Colonel Imam, (Note: Urdu: کرنل امام, romanized: Karnal Imām) was a Pakistani military officer. A key special ops specialist in the Pakistan Army, he is widely regarded as "Godfather of the Taliban".

A Pakistan Army officer, he was a member of the Special Service Group (SSG), Pakistan's army special forces, and was an intelligence officer in the ISI. A veteran of the Soviet–Afghan War, he is widely believed to have played a key role in the formation of the Taliban, after having helped train the Afghan mujahideen. He served as the Consul-General of Pakistan in Herat, Afghanistan.

"Colonel Imam," as Tarar was also known, was a commando-guerrilla warfare specialist, trained Mullah Omar and other Taliban factions and leaders. Colonel Imam remained active in Afghanistan's civil war until the 2001 United States led War on Terrorism, and supported the Taliban publicly through media.

Tarar was kidnapped along with fellow ISI officer Khalid Khawaja and British journalist Asad Qureshi and Qureshi's driver Rustam Khan on 26 March 2010. Khawaja was killed a month later. Qureshi and Khan were released in September 2010. Imam was killed by the Tehreek-e-Taliban Pakistan (TTP) in January 2011.

== Education and military career ==
Amir Sultan Tarar was a graduate from the PMA and from Fort Bragg. After he graduated from the Pakistan Military Academy, he joined the Pakistan Army's 15th Frontier Force Regiment as 2nd Lieutenant. Amir Sultan Tarar was sent to the United States in 1974, and was trained among the United States Army Special Forces. Upon his graduation from the Special Forces School, Amir Sultan Tarar was awarded the American Green beret by his training commander. Following his return to Pakistan, Amir Sultan Tarar joined the Special Service Group (SSG). In the 1980s, he participated in the Soviet–Afghan War. Colonel Imam, as he became known, was increasingly involved in Afghanistan's politics even after the Soviet withdrawal from Afghanistan. After the Soviet–Afghan War, Colonel Imam supported and trained Taliban fighters independently. It was alleged even in the 2000s that he still independently supported the Taliban independence movement in Afghanistan. He was a disciple of Ameer Muhammad Akram Awan, the current sheikh of silsila Naqshbandia Owaisia.

== Authentic knowledge about Amir Sultan Tarar ==
Little is known of Amir Sultan Tarar's true history or operational profile as an agent of the ISI. Most information about 'Colonel Imam' was generated by his own admission, as well as news media speculation. Pakistan's secrecy over internal and external security, plus the code of conduct of Pakistan Armed Forces personnel serving in sensitive institutions, prevents such details from being available or verifiable. In 2010, however, Amir Sultan Tarar gave interviews to foreign and domestic journalists in Rawalpindi.

Tarar's initial objective, after the Mujahedin infighting after Soviet withdrawal and before his involvement with Taliban, were unclear; his objectives at that time were just to find new friends for Pakistan from where to operate later, such as Akhaundzada of Helmand who had a blood feud with Hikmatyar and was a warlord with 17000 men under command. According to Colonel Imam's own claims, Soviets when in Afghanistan had put a 200 million Afghani bounty on him. He also claimed that, when he presented operational details to Aslam Baig after General Zia's death about anti-soviet struggle, the later was surprised as to the extent. In Cathey Schofield's book Inside Pakistan Army, Colonel Imam admitted meeting Osama Bin Laden in 1986.

== Kidnapping and execution ==
In March 2010, Colonel Imam, former ISI officer Khalid Khawaja, journalist Asad Qureshi, and Qureshi's driver Rustman Khan were abducted by an unknown militant group which called itself Asian Tigers. Khawaja's body was found near a stream in Karam Kot in April 2010 with a note attached saying he was with the CIA and ISI, about seven kilometres south of North Waziristan's main town of Mirali. Qureshi and Khan were freed in September 2010.

Colonel Imam was executed in captivity, as documented in a video released by Tehreek-i-Taliban Pakistan. Both the Haqqani network and the Afghan Taliban were purportedly against the execution. Colonel Imam's captors refused to release his body to his family unless a ransom was paid.
