= Chattal =

- Village
- Location in Pakistan
- Coordinates: 32°54′37″N 72°56′56″E
- Country: Pakistan
- Region: Punjab Province
- District: Chakwal District
- Time zone: UTC+5 (PST)

Chattal (Urdu: چتال) is a village located in Chak Malook union council of Chakwal District in the Punjab Province of Pakistan, it is part of Chakwal Tehsil. It is a village located approximately 9 km (5.6 mi) from Chakwal on the Chakwal-Jhelum road.

== Education ==
Schools in this village include:

1. Minhas Public Model School
2. Government Girls Elementary School
3. Government Primary School

== Entry Gate ==
Entry Gate of Chattal was made in the memory of Brigadier Sultan Amir Tarar who was executed in captivity, as documented in a video released by Tehreek-i-Taliban Pakistan.

Entry Gate of Chattal

== Notable residents ==
- Colonel Imam – Sultan Amir Tarar
