= Leepu & Pitbull =

- Genre: Reality TV
- Directed by: Sean Lewis; Joe Barker
- Starring: Nizamuddin "Leepu" Awlia; Steve "Pitbull" Trimboli
- Narrated by: Scott Matthews
- Music by: Extreme Productions Music; Strike Audio
- Composer: Edward White
- Country of origin: United States
- Original language: English
- No. of seasons: 1
- No. of episodes: 8

Production
- Executive producer: Sam Maynard
- Producers: Sean Lewis; Joe Barker
- Production location: Nassau County, New York
- Cinematography: Ben Joiner
- Editors: Hugh Williams; Adrian Murray
- Running time: 60 minutes
- Production company: Raw Productions

Original release
- Network: History
- Release: June 23 – August 11, 2015

"Leepu & Pitbull" is an American reality television series featuring mechanic and auto-garage shop owner, Steve "Pitbull" Trimboli and Bangladeshi car designer, Nizamuddin "Leepu" Awlia, where scrap cars are rebuilt for their owners into unique but affordable custom cars. The show is set in Trimboli's Pit Bull Motors Inc. in Freeport, New York, on Long Island and premiered on Wednesday, June 23, 2015, at 10:00 pm EST on History.

== Premise ==
The series teams up mechanic Steve "Pitbull" Trimboli with Bangladeshi car designer Leepu. Each episode features a different customer with a small budget, an interesting story, and a scrap car, which Pitbull and Leepu turn into a custom automobile. They sometimes have a difference of opinion on ways to complete a job, but they ultimately make each customer happy.

== Episodes ==
No.	Title	Original release date
1	"Custom Overdrive"	June 23, 2015
In the series premiere, Pitbull and Leepu take on their first job together when a client brings in a beat-up 1981 Chevy Camaro to customize for his son who graduated from college. Even though they need to make it into an automatic, Pitbull decides if they want a muscle car, he's got to go engine. Leepu finds his inspiration when he sees a brass eagle with spread wings at a junk yard and bends sheet metal into a beak design for the Camaro's hood.
2	"Wild Ride"	June 30, 2015
The guys have four weeks to customize a 1972 Ford Ranchero for Myles Kovacs, the founder and editor of DUB Magazine, which belonged to his father. If their design is up to the client's standards, then it will be featured in the New York Auto Show. Pitbull deals with his mechanic friends for freebies and gets a supped-up engine and a new transmission. But he is late coming back to the shop because, after years of rescuing endangered pit bulls, he saves one trapped in a car. Leepu gets inspiration from the custom wheels or "dubs" on the magazine's covers and puts 24-inch wheels on the newly built Ranchero.
3	"TailSpin"	July 7, 2015
The guys are tasked to transform a Japanese junker yellow limited edition 2002 Mitsubishi Lancer OZ Rally, into an American muscle car using parts from the junkyard. Since their client wants her car to look like Kim Kardashian owns it, so Leepu uses the model for his inspiration, designing a car with curvy lines and a rounded rear end. Meanwhile, Pitbull doubles the horsepower with a reconditioned engine and cold air intake exhaust system, as well as adding a turbo-charger to boost performance.
4	"Pickup Showdown"	July 14, 2015
The guys take on their first ever pickup, a beat-up 2000 Chevy S-10 truck. Despite their client's "plain and simple" wishes, Leepu plans to give it a full redesign. He includes in his design mean-looking headlights from a Japanese family car and taillights from a 2007 Cadillac CTS. Meanwhile, Pitbull replaces a junk motor with a 500 horsepower refurbished LS engine capable of going from 0 to 60 in record time—just in time to show the now custom truck off in front of a crowd at a local car show.
5	"King Cobra"	July 21, 2015
The guys customize a 2002 Ford Mustang GT convertible for a man who wants to give his wife a big surprise. Taking a page out of Leepu's book, Pitbull finds inspiration as he races his 1986 Mercedes stock car at the local track and adds a supercharger to the engine. Meanwhile, keeping in mind the client's instructions of turning the sharp-edges into the rounded-style of a Bentley; his wife's favorite car, Leepu transforms the classic muscle car into the curvy-lines of a cobra, his inspiration for his design.
6	"Drag Demon"	July 28, 2015
The guys take on their first race-car customization when they are hired by Pitbull's boat-racing buddy to transform his slow and heavy 1987 Oldsmobile Cutlass into a "unique" high performance street-legal dragster, much to Leepu's delight. But, Pitbull gets sidetracked by a bet with his buddy who challenges him to a speedboat race to knock $1,000 off the price, while the rest of the mechanics get their passion project when they save a 1966 Chevy Biscayne from becoming scrap and turn it into a rat rod.
7	"Quarter Mile Monster"	August 4, 2015
The guys have two weeks left to finish the 1987 Oldsmobile Cutlass dragster and the stakes just got higher. Not only does Steve's buddy want the car to run a sub-10 second, he challenges him to a quarter-mile race against his Chevy SS drag truck. But if Steve wins then the Cutlass isn't fast enough and it's free. So Steve adds 800 horsepower with a twin-turbo charged Chevy V-8 engine. Meanwhile, Leepu gets inspiration from a 1972 De Tomaso Pantera GTS and designs an aerodynamic nose, cowl-induction hood and giant spoiler, all promising better performance on the track.
8	"American Chrome"	August 11, 2015
The guys have five weeks to customize a beat-up 1991 Chevy Caprice station wagon for a wife who wants to surprise her hard-working husband on his birthday. Feeling uninspired with its whale-shaped body, Leepu doesn't want to take the job. But he finds inspiration in the car's cousin; a 1965 Chevy Impala, and uses chrome for the front and back bumpers. Meanwhile, Steve replaces the old and slow engine and adds a small-block V8 and custom chrome fuel injection kit, delivering double horsepower.

== Broadcast ==
Internationally, the series premiered in Australia on A&E on October 14, 2015, and October 12 in Brazil. The series also airs in India on History TV 18.
