= Bernie Fineman =

British television personality

Bernie Fineman (born September 1945, Bow, London, United Kingdom) is a British automotive manager, technician and workshop controller, and former associate of the Kray Twins. In the 1960s he was a mechanic for the Kray Twins and has admitted to fixing their vehicles after they were used in the Kray's crimes.

He is best known for his appearance in the reality television Bangla Bangers and Chop Shop: London Garage along with his partner Nizamuddin "Leepu" Awlia, where they built super cars from old run down vehicles.

He also presented Classic Car Rescue along with Mario Pacione. A 2013 interview with Fineman by express.co.uk reports that he was 68 at the time of the interview.
