= Leepu Nizamuddin Awlia =

Bangladeshi coachbuilder

Nizamuddin Awlia
- নিজামুদ্দিন আউলিয়া
- Born: Nizamuddin Awlia; 1 October 1968 (age 57); Dacca, East Pakistan, Pakistan (now Dhaka, Dhaka Division, Bangladesh)
- Citizenship: American
- Occupations: Automotive designer, coachbuilder
- Years active: 1994–present
- Spouse: Deepa Awlia
- Children: 3

Nizamuddin Awlia (Bengali: নিজামুদ্দিন আউলিয়া; born 1 October 1968), commonly known as Leepu (Bengali: লিপু), is a Bangladeshi-born-American automotive designer and coachbuilder, best known for building imitation supercars out of old models.

== Early life ==
Awlia was born in Dhaka, Bangladesh. He studied at Dhaka Residential Model College until ninth grade. His father was an officer at the U.S. Embassy in Riyadh who moved to Saudi Arabia where Awlia attended college. Awlia's passion for cars also began when he was growing up in Riyadh. At the age of 16, he visited his first motor show in Saudi Arabia, where his father bought him a Mazda. He lived in Lalmatia.

== Career ==
In October 1994, at the age of 26, Awlia made the "Leemo-bil", a version of his dream car, the Lamborghini Countach. Even though he did not know how to do bodywork or paint and used a poster for the design.

In the 2000s, after setting up business in Dhaka, Awlia made the "Leepu", a loose copy of another of his dream cars, a Lamborghini Diablo. For £2,500, he turned a Daihatsu Charade into a Leepu-mobile. Awlia has also made a 22-foot-long limousine - made by welding together several cars, and powered by a 2.8 litre diesel engine.

Awlia converted rusting Toyotas and Hondas into imitation Ferraris and Lamborghinis. In his converted garage, he worked with four mechanics, stripping down Japanese cars and replacing their bodywork with metal cut in the form of a sports car.

Awlia visited the General Motors Institute in Michigan. However, he put off studying there and decided to open his own workshop to get some practical experience. After doing this for three years, he went back to Bangladesh. He started making cars to order, based on old Daihatsus and Toyotas.

In 2004, Awlia came to the attention of Intersection magazine, and received international interest. He featured in the Dhaka City Exhibition in the UK which ran from 2005 to 2010.

In 2006, Discovery Channel requested Awlia to build two cars in eight weeks for them. Awlia completed the cars within seven weeks with the help of cockney car mechanic, Bernie Fineman. In April 2006, the first car was unveiled during a three-day show at The Dhaka Motor Show at the Bangladesh-China Friendship Conference Centre. It was one of Awlia's sports models, M26, it was made in four weeks using a 22-year-old Toyota Sprinter with an imported chassis. On 7 May 2006, the second car, The Peace Car, was unveiled at the Bangladesh National Museum. After the heavy modification, the 1979 Toyota Crown was difficult to trace.

In June 2006, Awlia was invited to London to work on a car transformation project by the near completed Rich Mix Centre in East London as part of their opening exhibition project. He became "artist in residence" at the Rich Mix centre. For two months, he worked on handcrafting a Ford Capri into something more stylish. Called "Car", the result was on show in the summer, exhibited with a film on how the vehicle was built.

In May 2007, the "Angel Car" was launched at the Boishakhi Mela Festival in Brick Lane. Awila and Fineman built the car in their workshop beneath a Whitechapel railway arch in just three weeks.

Awlia worked with London-based Raw on two programs in 2007 and 2008: "Bangla Bangers", a pair of one-hour Discovery specials about his car-customizing business in Bangladesh's capital, Dhaka; and "Chop Shop: London Garage", a one-season sequel series that ran on Discovery overseas. In 2007, Awlia has featured on Discovery Channel's Bangla Bangers, a car transformation project with his partner Bernie Fineman building supercars out of old models without any advanced equipment. in his back-street workshop in Dhaka. The programme was later followed by sequel-series Chop Shop: London Garage, in which designers Awlia and Fineman created a range of modified cars commissioned by celebrities. Their challenge was to produce custom-built cars on a tight budget, while matching the requirements of each client. A 'gangster car' created for Martin Kemp, was purchased through auction shortly after it was created, where "it will be trashed and posted through the special VW Action 'shitheap' letter box, and then environmentally recycled".

In 2015, Awlia featured in History channel's Leepu & Pitbull, a reality show about Steve "Pitbull" Trimboli's Freeport custom-car garage. They transform "junk" cars into customized super cars via a cash-producing business venture. They completed seven cars over eight episodes, with the final car, a race car, split into two episodes.

== Personal life ==
Since 2013, Awlia has lived in Coeur d'Alene, Idaho, with his wife and three children.

== See also ==
- Bangladeshi Americans
- List of Bangladeshi Americans
