= Talyn Rahman-Figueroa =

British diplomatic consultant and chief executive officer (born 1985)

- Born: 8 May 1985 (age 41); London, England
- Occupation: Diplomatic Consultant
- Years active: 2011–present
- Title: Chief Executive Officer and founder of Grassroot Diplomat
- Website: grassrootdiplomat.org

Talyn Rahman-Figueroa; (born 8 May 1985) is a British diplomatic consultant and chief executive officer and founder of Grassroot Diplomat. Rahman-Figueroa was born and brought up in London, England.

== Education ==
Rahman-Figueroa received her BA in Japanese and management from SOAS, which included further language training at Kyoto University of Foreign Studies in Kyoto, Japan. She completed an MA in diplomatic studies from the University of Westminster as part of the Diplomatic Academy of London with additional training at the United Nations and the European Union. She later gained a Diploma in Middle Eastern and North African Politics from Université Al-Akhawayn in Morocco and a Human Rights Fellowship at McGill University in Canada.

After her studies, Rahman-Figueroa completed supplementary diplomatic training at the House of Commons, the European Union Commission, and the United Nations Headquarters in New York.

== Early career ==
Rahman-Figueroa spent two years completing her diplomatic training at various governmental institutions.

Rahman-Figueroa joined the Women's International League for Peace and Freedom (WILPF) to engage in issues of gender and women's rights operated by the United Nations. She was nominated to the executive board, where she influenced national campaigns and introduced initiatives to attract younger members. She also served on the executive team of Action for UN Renewal, an organisation that educates the public about the work of the UN, focusing on communications and media campaigns. She spent much of her time engaging in issues including: women's rights, corporate social responsibility, nuclear disarmament, climate change, and UN reform. Rahman-Figueroa's work in relation to such issues has been published in foreign policy magazines, including American Diplomacy, Diplomatic Insight, Political Insight and many others. Her work in these organisations plus many more, led her to a career in diplomacy.

Rahman-Figueroa has participated in several international summits such as the Millennium Development Goals Conference, United Nations Climate Change conference and Global Humanitarian Forum and used this opportunity to network with government officials who were already serving their country on the world stage. During this time, she completed her first book Women in Diplomacy that assessed the role of British women in the diplomatic service. She is on the board of several institutions and consults independently for various foreign governments.

=== Grassroot Diplomat ===
Rahman-Figueroa has been described as a 'change-maker' by the diplomatic corps, putting the interest of the people first, before and beyond political and national interest. In 2011, Rahman-Figueroa established Grassroot Diplomat, a not-for-profit diplomatic consultancy that makes diplomacy inclusive for everyone. Grassroot Diplomat engages with both official diplomats and citizen diplomats to help build positive impressions of their country that serve at the level of all people, no matter what their nationality. Ultimately, the consultancy works on projects related to digital diplomacy and public diplomacy to ensure that diplomats and embassies remain relevant in a modern world.

Over the years, Rahman-Figueroa has specialised in strategic communications, personal branding, and grassroots diplomacy having worked with Desmond Tutu, Bob Geldof, former UN Secretary-General Kofi Annan, Nobel Laureate Muhammad Yunus and former U.S. governor Arnold Schwarzenegger. In 2013, Rahman-Figueroa hosted the inaugural Grassroot Diplomat Initiative Award, an award that recognises politicians and diplomats representing civilian interests at the highest level.

In 2018, Rahman-Figueroa published the Diplomatic Planner - a 12-month career development toolkit for international relations practitioners. She has developed a range of products and services to provide global diplomats with building brands for their cause, mission, and country. She provides coaching to diplomats around the world in modernising their public communications, creating personal branding, and engaging in more effective community campaigns that break negative stereotypes and national misconceptions.

== Awards ==
In April 2012, Rahman-Figueroa won the Channel S Award for Graduate Excellence.

== See also ==
- British Bangladeshi
- List of British Bangladeshis
