= Grassroot Diplomat =

Global non-profit consulting firm

- Formation: August 2011
- Founder: Talyn Rahman-Figueroa
- Type: Diplomatic consultancy
- Headquarters: London, United Kingdom
- Services: Citizen diplomacy, public diplomacy, digital diplomacy, diplomacy
- Website: www.grassrootdiplomat.org

Grassroot Diplomat was a global non-profit, non-political, diplomatic consultancy established in 2013. The consultancy specializes in digital diplomacy and public diplomacy working with foreign governments and citizen diplomats to help build positive impressions of their country that serve at the level of all people, no matter their nationality.

== History ==
Grassroot Diplomat was founded by Talyn Rahman-Figueroa as a not-for-profit in 2011.

In 2013 it was launched at the Embassy of Bulgaria, London, hosted by Konstantin Dimitrov and Dr. Jamie Shea.

== Mission and objective ==
As an independent diplomatic agency, Grassroot Diplomat has no allegiance to any government in order to remain apolitical and works with all diplomatic missions, anywhere in the world.

== Services ==
In 2018, Grassroot Diplomat published the Diplomatic Planner, a 12-month career development planner for international relations practitioners. As an extension, Grassroot Diplomat developed the 'Grassroot Diplomat Online Academy' to enable independent learning for diplomats looking to become effective leaders.

== Grassroot Diplomat Initiative Award ==
The Grassroot Diplomat Initiative Award was established to recognize outstanding diplomats and politicians who represent the people's interests at the highest level. A total of three diplomats and three politicians are awarded in the areas of policy delivery and influence, public support on social causes, and business assistance and job creation.

In 2013, Rahman-Figueroa was the host of the inaugural Grassroot Diplomat Initiative Award. She later passed on the role to television psychologist Dr. Linda Papadopoulos in 2014. Forthcoming events are held in London, Washington DC, and Brussels.

== See also ==
- Citizen diplomacy
- Public diplomacy
