= Kaniz Ali =

British make-up artist (born 1985)

- Born: July 1985 (age 40)
- Occupations: Makeup artist, Beauty editor

Kaniz Ali (born 1985) is a British make-up artist.

== Career ==
In 2009, Kaniz left London-based Bird & Bird International law firm to start her fashion career full-time. She is the international beauty editor of ASIANA Wedding International, and the founder of Books of Deen.

== Publications ==
Ali's work has appeared on 25 magazine front covers, making up Bollywood celebrities such as Kareena Kapoor Khan, Sonam Kapoor, Amy Jackson, Urvashi Rautela, Armeena Khan, Sadia Khan, Mehreen Syed, Fouzia Aman, and Faryal Makhdoom Khan.

Her work has appeared in magazines including Asiana, Asiana Wedding International, Grazia, Asian Bride, Khush.

She is the publisher of two Surah books; Surah Book 1 & Surah 2.

== Awards ==
- 2011: “Make Up Artist of The Year”- The International Asian Fashion Awards, Park Lane, Mayfair.
- 2015: “Make Up Artist of The Year”- The British Asian Wedding Awards, The Montcalm, Marble Arch London.
- 2019: “Make Up Artist of The Year”- The Bangladeshi Fashion & Lifestyle Awards, Canary Wharf.
- 2020: “Influencer of The Year”- The Asian Industry Beauty Awards.

== Humanitarian work ==
Ali has built schools in Iraq, water pumps in Bangladesh and a mosque in Ghana, and has provided aid to refugees in Syria, Palestine, Bangladesh, Lebanon.
