= Rizvan Rahman =

Pakistani-born British Painter (born 1970)

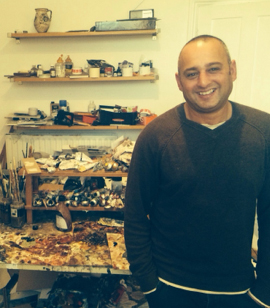
- Born: Karachi, Pakistan
- Occupations: Painter, Fine Art
- Notable work: “Point of Departure”

Rizvan Rahman (born 1970) is a Pakistani-born British painter. Known for his impasto oil portrait and figure paintings, Rahman launched his first solo show in Mayfair, London, in February 2016, to favorable accolade and press, including The Times and The Independent. Rahman's work has been compared to Lucian Freud.

== Early life and family ==
Rizvan Rahman was born in the city of Karachi, Pakistan by the Arabian Sea. His father's profession was a golfer who travelled with the family across the world. Rizvan Rahman practiced to be a professional golfer, but made the decision to concentrate fully on Fine Art. Rahman achieved a BA Honours degree in Fine Art from De Montfort University near to his home town of Leicester. He is married to a primary school teacher and they have three young children.

== Career ==
After leaving school, he developed a painting style influenced by the Old Masters, with a particular interest in the work of Rembrandt, Velazquez, Van Dyke and Rubens. He graduated from De Montfort University with a degree in fine art and later qualified as an art and design teacher. at the Royal College of Art

Rahman began dealing in art in 2006, after several years of collecting art as a hobby. He maintains that he was ill-advised over several paintings he sold between 2006 and 2008, which were later identified as forgeries. He was issued an 18-month sentence for dealing forgeries, after the case came before Leicester Crown Court. In October 2011, Rahman served a 5-month prison sentence. Following the sentence, he returned to art.

Rahman's first solo exhibition, “Point of Departure”, consisted of 22 large scale figurative oil paintings, received attention from the press upon opening in Mayfair, London.

== Solo exhibitions ==
2016: “Point of Departure”, Mayfair, London
