= Asad Shamim =

British businessperson

- Occupations: businessman, talent manager
- Known for: founder and CEO of Furniture in Fashion
- Website: https://www.asadshamim.com

Asad Shamim is a British businessman and sports talent manager. He is best known as the founder of Furniture in Fashion, an online furniture retailer in the United Kingdom.

== Career ==
In June 2007, Shamim founded 'Furniture in Fashion' in Bolton. It operates as a subsidiary of 'World of Fashion' and is known for manufacturing its products in its factory in Germany. Furniture in Fashion moved its headquarters to Stone Hill Business Park in Farnworth in 2012. In May 2014, the company agreed to supply office furniture for the Ministry of Education and the Ministry of Health in Iraq.

In January 2013, Shamim launched 'Hoststop', an internet hosting service that hosts personal and business websites. In the same year, Shamim became a sports manager for notable athletes. In 2015, Shamim began assisting Muhammad Ali, a UK-born athlete diagnosed with type 1 diabetes, in obtaining a boxing license while the British Boxing Board of Control prohibited individuals with type 1 or type 2 diabetes from boxing professionally. He collaborated with endocrinologist Dr. Ian Gallen and partnered with organisations such as Diabetes UK to advocate for Ali's eligibility, which granted Ali his boxing license in May 2018, making him the first diabetic professional boxer.

Shamim serves as a senior advisor to Sheikh Ahmed Bin Faisal Al Qasimmi since January 2022, whose family rules the emirates of Sharjah and Ras Al Khaimah. Shamim advises on UK business investments in the UAE, and Al Qasimmi's ventures in the UK, including housing projects and business parks.

In February 2023, Shamin was appointed by the International Football Association (IFA7) as its Vice President for the United Arab Emirates and the United Kingdom.

== Awards and recognitions ==
In December 2018, Shamim received the Asian Business Leaders Award for founding Furniture in Fashion in the category of Successful Application of Digital Media. In 2019, Shamim was awarded the British Muslim Awards, and was a finalist in the 2020 Asian Business Leaders Awards. In May 2024, he was awarded the Business Leader of the Year award at the 2024 British Muslim Awards.

== Philanthropy ==
Shamim is the founder of Insaaf 4U translated as "Justice for You", a non-profit organisation to aid families experiencing legal problems in Pakistan.
