= Bangla Bangers =

- Also known as: Chop Shop: London Garage
- Genre: Reality Television; Documentary; Motorsport
- Starring: Nizamuddin "Leepu" Awlia; Bernie Fineman
- Countries of origin: United Kingdom; Bangladesh
- Original languages: English; Bengali
- No. of seasons: 1 (Bangla Bangers); 2 (Chop Shop: London Garage)
- No. of episodes: 2 (Bangla Bangers); 23 (Chop Shop: London Garage)

Production
- Running time: 45–50 minutes

Original release
- Release: March 2007 – December 2008

Bangla Bangers, later followed by sequel-series Chop Shop: London Garage, was a reality program on the Discovery Channel about Bangladeshi coachbuilder Nizamuddin "Leepu" Awlia and Cockney mechanic Bernie Fineman. In every episode they and their team attempt to build a supercar in a mere matter of weeks out of an automobile which they generally obtain from a wrecking yard.

Leepu converts rusting old autos into Ferrari and Lamborghini styled fast sports cars and limousines in his small workshop in Bangladesh's capital of Dhaka, and then later in the "Chop Shop" garage he and Bernie operate out of in Brick Lane, which is Britain's largest Bangladeshi community. What makes these episodes notable is that the vehicles constructed by the team are made in a meager shop using low-tech, basic tools; the bodywork is handmade from sheet metal. Assisted by Bernie's mechanical expertise, the improvements are sometimes questionable.

On 6 September 2009 the 1988 SAAB 900 Turbo that the Chop Shop team rebuilt into a one-off 'Gangsta Car' for Martin Kemp was demolished by monster truck Podzilla during the VW Action car festival at Santa Pod Raceway, the very same place where the new car first broke down prior to its initial test run. a workshop is located in Cudworth St. 20A / Tent Street 108

== Episodes ==
Chop Shop: London Garage

Season 1

Episode 1 – Car Fireworks
Episode 2 – Phoenix Reveal
Episode 3 – Super Surfer
Episode 4 – Angel Cab
Episode 5 – Tiger Car
Episode 6 – Frog Eco Car
Episode 7 – Boy Racer Car
Episode 8 – Flame Racer
Episode 9 – Congestion Buster
Episode 10 – Huntin' Car
Episode 11 – Virgin Car
Episode 12 – Best of Series 1

Season 2

Episode 1 – Saab 900 Turbo
Episode 2 – Saab 900 Turbo
Episode 3 – Ford Capri
Episode 4 – Ford Capri
Episode 5 – Rover Concept
Episode 6 – Rover Concept
Episode 7 – VW Golf
Episode 8 – VW Golf
Episode 9 – Porsche 944
Episode 10 – Porsche 944
Episode 11 – Best of Series 2

== Cast and characters ==
- Leepu Nizamuddin Awlia as himself
- Bernie Fineman as himself
- Maciej Wolanczyk as himself
