= Nisar Smiler =

Pakistani karateka

- Born: 1951 (age 74–75); England
- Style: Karate
- Teacher: Gōgen Yamaguchi

Nisar Smiler is a British Pakistani martial artist, actor, and radio presenter who is widely considered one of the early pioneers of Karate in northern England.

Smiler, a 50-time gold medalist and 2x world champion, had trained under Gōgen Yamaguchi in Japan.

In 2010, he was inducted into the karate hall of fame for his contributions to the martial art.

== Personal life ==
Smiler was born to Pakistani parents in England in 1951. Smiler started participating in Karate at the young age of three.

As of 2002, His whole family were involved in Karate. His then teenaged sons, Nadir and Amir were on the British Karate Junior Team, his then 10-year-old daughter Maryam Nisar had achieved 12 gold-medals and his wife had also achieved a black-belt in Karate.

== Karate career ==
Smiler has previously been 2x World Champion, 4x British Champion and 4x European Champion.

As of 2002, Smiler has won 50 gold medals, winning one of those medals in the World Martial Arts Open Championships that year, stating;

"I was over the moon to receive my 50th gold medal. I train hard, up to five nights a week, and have no plans to stop competing in the near future."

Smiler devotes much of his time training others in clubs throughout the West Yorkshire region.

== Outside Karate ==
=== Radio Career and Community Work ===
Smiler, who began a career in radio in the 1980s after discovering his love for the industry in Japan, initiated his own radio station, Radio Paigham, in hopes to pass his skills onto amateurs and hobbyists. He ran the station from his home in Springwood. The station was to a continuation of his radio training schemes which had previously helped hundreds of people. He Stated;

"It’s a difficult industry to get into and when I was learning in the 1980s nobody wanted to teach me...When I had established myself I decided to help others by passing on my skills and experience...The skills you learn in radio, such as effectively communicating to an audience, are also transferable and can help anyone looking for a new job or change of career direction.. It’s an honor to be able to pass on my skills and give something back to the community."

Smiler had previously worked for the Sunrise Radio and Asian Sound stations, and has subsequently been involved in other community work initiatives.

=== Acting career ===
Smiler has had a part-time acting career and has appeared as extras in soaps such as Coronation Street and Emmerdale as well as the made for-TV film, The Tournament, playing an assassin.

=== Television ===
Smiler has previously worked as a host for one of the largest Asian television networks in the UK, DM Digital, appearing on programs such as the Punjabi talk-show 'Punjab De Rang' (Colours of the Punjab) and Martial Arts reality show 'Fighting Masters of Martial Arts' which Smiler co-hosted with fitness model Emily Reynolds.
