= Kidnapping of Asad Qureshi =

2010 kidnapping in Pakistan

Asad Qureshi
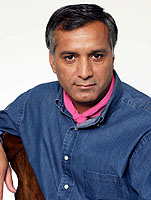
- Born: Asad Karim Qureshi; Rawalpindi, Pakistan
- Occupation: Filmmaker
- Website: Asad Qureshi official website

Asad Qureshi is a British-Pakistani filmmaker who was kidnapped on 26 March 2010 by a militant group called the "Asian Tigers" in Pakistan's Federally Administered Tribal Areas along the Afghanistan border, where he was making a film in North Waziristan and interviewing Taliban leaders. Qureshi was accompanied by his driver, Rustam Khan, and two senior members of the Inter-Services Intelligence, Khalid Khawaja and Colonel Imam during his trip. All four were abducted; Khawaja was killed and his body was found a month later in Mir Ali with an attached note accusing him of spying for the United States and being responsible for killing people during the Siege of Lal Masjid. Qureshi and his driver were released in September 2010 through family negotiations after 165 days of captivity. Colonel Imam was executed in January 2011. Qureshi's release was a rare occurrence as the Pakistani Taliban have been known to execute most of their victims.

Qureshi has British Pakistani origins. He has a reputation as an experienced filmmaker, and prior to being detained, he had been based in Pakistan for over five years. It was not his first visit to Waziristan. In 2009 he made "The Battle of Swat Valley" for the BBC's Panorama, charting the army action taken in Swat against the Taliban. In April 2011 his film Defusing Human Bombs was screened in Pakistan; it shows the rehabilitation of children kidnapped by the Taliban and trained to be suicide bombers. He had started the film in September 2009 and the project was put on hold when he was kidnapped. He then continued the project after his release.

Usman Punjabi, who planned the kidnap, was killed two weeks before Qureshi's release and Sabir Mehsud, the leader of the Asian Tigers, was himself kidnapped by Hakimullah Mehsud. Sabir Mehsud was tortured and beaten and shot in the face so many times that he was beyond recognition.
