= Sanchita Islam =

English artist, painter, writer and filmmaker (1973 - 2023)

- Born: 28 April 1973; Manchester, Lancashire, England
- Died: 3 July 2023 (aged 50); Manchester, Lancashire, England
- Education: Manchester Metropolitan University; London School of Economics; Northern Media School
- Known for: Graffiti
- Movement: Pigment Explosion
- Website: pigmentexplosion.com

Sanchita Islam (28 April 1973 – 3 July 2023) was an English artist, painter, writer and filmmaker of Bangladeshi descent. In 1999, she founded Pigment Explosion, which has branched out into projects including film, painting, drawing, writing and photography.

== Early life ==
Islam was born in Manchester, Lancashire, England to Bangladeshi parents. Islam's father died when she was eight months old, at the time her mother was in her mid 20s with three children under the age of four. Islam and her sisters were brought up by their mother and step-father. Her mother was a social worker in Manchester and Oldham.

From 1977 to 1984, Islam attended Amberleigh Preparatory School. From 1984 to 1991, she attended Chorlton Convent High School for Girls. In June 1991, she completed A-levels in Art, English Literature, History at Loreto College in Manchester. In June 1992, she completed an Art foundation diploma at Manchester Metropolitan University.

In September 1996, Islam graduated from the London School of Economics, University of London with a BSc in International History and a MSc in Comparative Politics. In February 1998, she completed an MA in Directing and Screenwriting sponsored by Channel 4 at the Northern Media School at Sheffield Hallam University. She then enrolled for BA in Fine Art Practice and Theory of Visual Art at Chelsea College of Art and Design and dropped out in her second year.

== Career ==
From 1996 to 1998, Islam had a short career working as researcher in television for London Weekend Television.

In 1998, Islam participated in the group show 000 at the Whitechapel Art Gallery. Later, during a show of her drawings and paintings, she was told she would have to be at the gallery full-time. Islam decided to take her practice to the public.

People came to the gallery and were more interested in watching Islam paint, which urged Islam to combine live painting, live visuals and live music. In January 1999, Pigment Explosion was initially set up to perform live art events, but now specialises in international art projects. Since 1999, Pigment Explosion has branched out into projects that include film, painting, drawing, writing and photography.

Islam has done nearly 100 group and solo shows in London, Paris, New York and Bangladesh. She has published 10 books and written two plays as well as readings tours with writers like Irvine Welsh and Miranda Sawyer. She has worked with the British Council, on projects with the elderly, workshops in schools and with disadvantaged children. She has directed and/or produced 15 films, and screened her work in London, New York, Bangladesh, Kuala Lumpur, Rome, India, Brussels, Pakistan, Frankfurt, Her films and books, which combine text and drawings, have been funded by the Arts Council, BBC, British Council and Commonwealth Institute.

She was an artist in residence at the Whitechapel Art Gallery between 2003 and 2004, she was artist in residence at the Open Gallery from 2004 to 2008, and also worked as an artist in residence at TVF Media from 2004 to 2009. She was also artist in resident at Artscape and Shoreditch House and her art features in various venues around London such as Sketch, Mark Hix's restaurant and she was commissioned to do over one hundred paintings for Clifton Hotel Group in Bristol.

In 2010, the UK Film Council commissioned Islam's animated film The White Wall. In 2010 and 2011 the theatre group Estaca Zero Teatro in Portugal performed two of Islam's plays, The Suitcase and Hello.

In March 2013, she had a mid-career retrospective at Rich Mix. KAOS (TrActor's sister organisation) awarded her a grant to complete the second scroll project with patients suffering from mental health problems in Brussels 2014. Rich Mix has invited Pigment Explosion again to exhibit this second scroll and write/perform a play about art, madness and disability, the show is scheduled in June 2015. In March of the same year, she was interviewed by Nadia Ali on BBC Asian Network about her exhibition The Rebel Within.

In January 2015, Muswell Hill Press published her new book, written under the pseudonym Q.S Lam, Schizophrenics Can Be Good Mothers Too. In June 2015, the book was launched in London at Shoreditch House and Rich Mix.

== Personal life ==
At one stage Islam lived and worked in East London, and was married with two children.

In 2009, at the age of 36, she had her first experience of psychosis.

Sanchita Islam died in Manchester on 3 July 2023, aged 50.

== Books ==
| Year | Title | Funding | Publisher | Notes |
|---|---|---|---|---|
| 2002 | From Briarwood to Barisal to Brick Lane | Arts Council, British Council | | Collaborative work |
| 2004 | Old Meets Young | Arts Council, British Council | | |
| 2005 | Hidden | Arts Council, British Council, Tower Hamlets Council | | |
| 2007 | Avenues | Arts Council, BBC, Pigment Explosion | Chipmunka Publishing | |
| 2007 | Connecting Kids | Arts Council, BBC, Pigment Explosion | Chipmunka Publishing | |
| 2007 | Cloud Catcher | Arts Council, BBC, Pigment Explosion | Chipmunka Publishing | |
| 2008 | Eternal Pollution of a Dented Mind | | Chipmunka Publishing | Collection of poems |
| 2008 | Gungi Blues | | Chipmunka Publishing | Novel |
| 2015 | Schizophrenics Can Be Good Mothers Too | | Muswell Hill Press | Published under the pseudonym Q S Lam |
| 2017 | Dented | | Chipmunka Publishing | Collection of poems |

== Filmography ==
| Year | Title | Credit | Note(s) |
|---|---|---|---|
| 2010 | Magic Hour 2 | Director, writer | |
| 2011 | White Wall | Director | |

== See also ==
- British Bangladeshi
- List of British Bangladeshis
