= Asian Tigers (militant group) =

Afghan militant group

The Asian Tigers was an Islamist militant group, first publicised when they claimed credit for the kidnapping of former Pakistani intelligence officers Khalid Khawaja and Colonel Imam and British journalist Asad Qureshi and his driver Rustam Khan in March 2010. Khawaja was killed in April 2010. Qureshi and Khan were released in September 2010 after 165 days in captivity. Imam was killed in January 2011.

The group was widely believed to have been affiliated with the so-called Punjabi Taliban and was dominated by ethnic Punjabi and Mehsud members. The group was also variously described as a breakoff of Lashkar-e Jhangvi or a front group for the Harkat-ul-Jihad-al-Islami. It was also considered to be affiliated with Jaish-e-Mohammad, Lashkar-e-Taiba, and Tehrik-i-Taliban Pakistan.

There has not any reported activity of the Asian Tigers in 15 years and it is largely considered defunct.
