= List of Academy Award winners and nominees for Best International Feature Film =

National origin of Academy Award winners and nominees for Best International Feature Film (as of 2025) Won the award Nominated for the award United States (ineligible for competition)

The Academy Award for Best International Feature Film (formerly known as Best Foreign Language Film prior to 2020) is handed out annually by the U.S.-based Academy of Motion Picture Arts and Sciences to a feature-length motion picture produced outside the United States of America with a predominantly non-English dialogue track.

When the first Academy Awards ceremony was held on May 16, 1929, to honor films released in 1927–28, there was no separate category for foreign language films. Between 1947 and 1955, the Academy presented Special/Honorary Awards to the best foreign language films released in the United States. These awards, however, were not handed out on a regular basis (no award was given in 1953), and were not competitive since there were no nominees but simply one winning film per year. For the 1956 Academy Awards, a competitive Academy Award of Merit, known as the Best Foreign Language Film Award, was created for non-English speaking films, and has been given annually since then.

Unlike other Academy Awards, the Best International Feature Film Award is not presented to a specific individual. It is accepted by the winning film's director, but is considered an award for the submitting country as a whole. As of 2014, the Academy changed its rules so that the name of the director is etched onto the Oscar statuette, in addition to the film's country. The director also gets to keep the statuette.

Over the years, the Best International Feature Film and its predecessors have been given almost exclusively to European films: out of the 74 awards handed out by the Academy since 1947 to foreign language films, fifty-seven have gone to European films,^{[A]} nine to Asian films,^{[B]} five to films from the Americas and three to African films. The late Italian filmmaker Federico Fellini directed four winning motion pictures during his lifetime, more than any other director. If Special Awards are taken into account, then Fellini's record is tied by his countryman Vittorio De Sica. The Soviet epic War and Peace (1966–67), for its part, is the longest motion picture to have won the Best Foreign Language Film Award. Filmed from 1962 to 1966, it ran for more than seven hours.

== Winners and nominees ==
In the following table, the years are listed as per Academy convention, and generally correspond to the year of film release; the ceremonies are always held the following year. Films in bold and dark blue background have received an Academy Award; winning films from 1947 to 1955 won a Special/Honorary Award as denoted in the key, while all other winning films won a regular Academy Award of Merit. Films that are neither highlighted nor in bold are the nominees. When sorted chronologically, the table always lists the winning film first and then the four other nominees.

The Submitting country column indicates the country that officially submitted the film to the Academy, and is not necessarily indicative of the film's main country of production. The original titles of the films are also mentioned, as well as the names of the directors and the languages used in the dialogue track, even though none of these elements is officially included in the nomination.

When several languages are used in a film, the predominant one is always listed first; the names of the other languages are written in smaller typesize and placed between brackets. When a film's original title is in a language that uses a non-Latin script, it is first transliterated into the Latin alphabet and then written in its original script.

Films from the former Yugoslavia are written in both Latin and Cyrillic due to the fact that the previously official Serbo-Croatian language used both alphabets. Chinese film titles are romanized according to the pinyin system, and are written using the characters employed in their submitting country, i.e. traditional Chinese ones for films submitted by Hong Kong and Taiwan, and simplified Chinese ones for films submitted by the People's Republic of China.

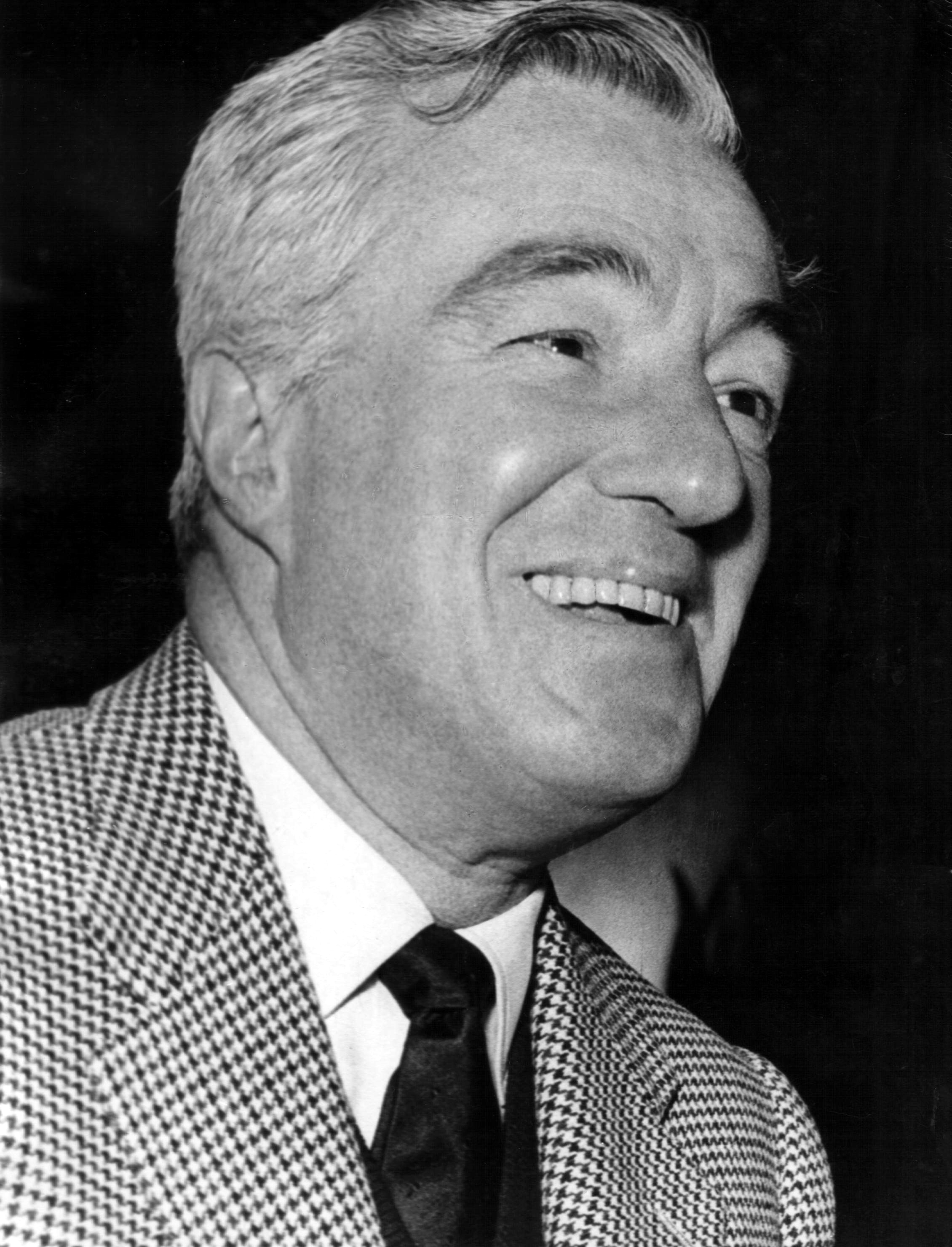
Vittorio De Sica directed four of the winners: Shoe-Shine, Bicycle Thieves, Yesterday, Today and Tomorrow and The Garden of the Finzi Continis

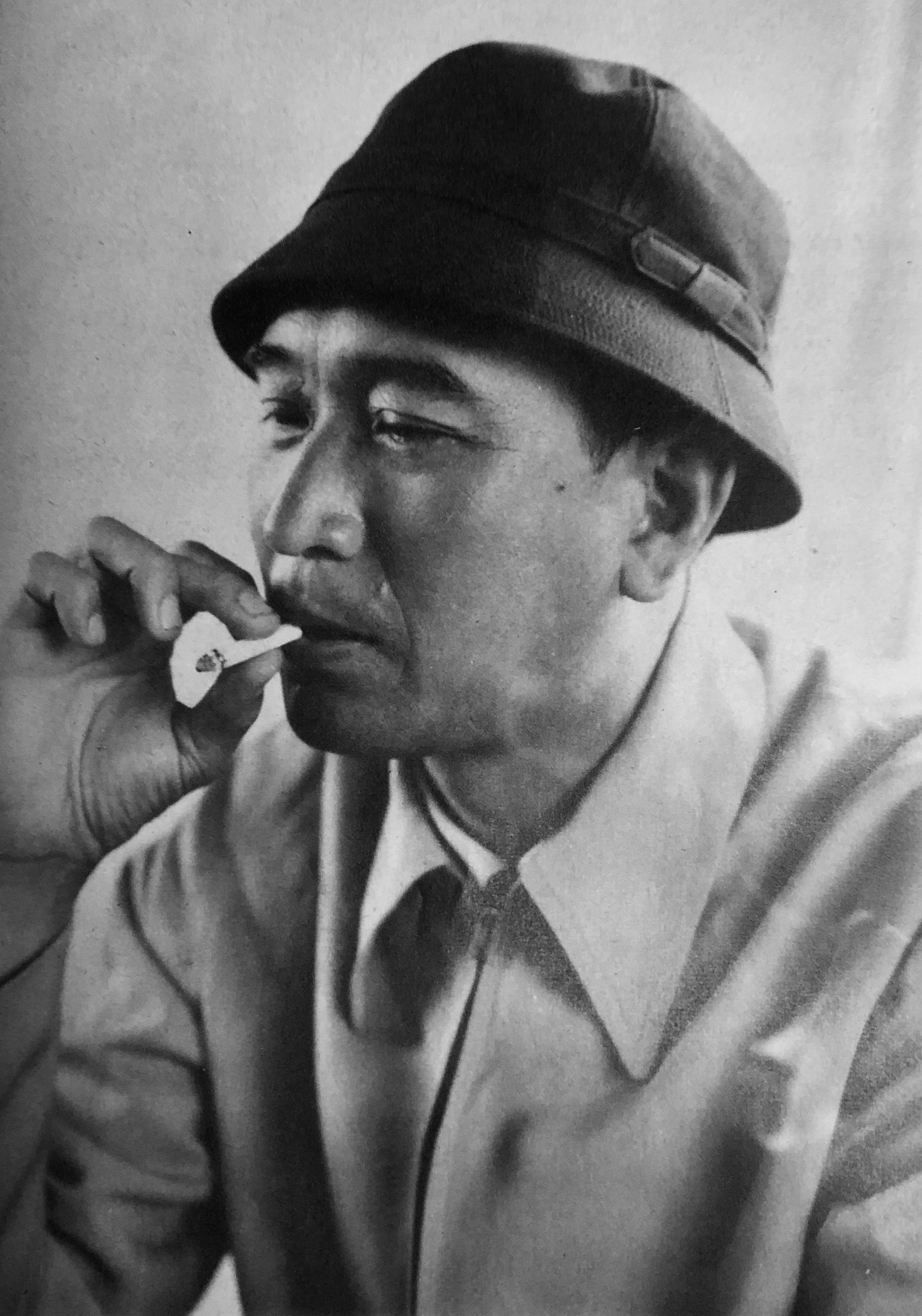
Akira Kurosawa directed two of the winners: Rashomon (1950) and Dersu Uzala (1975)

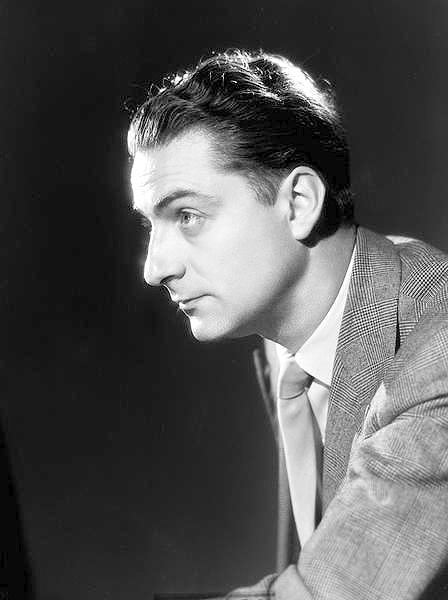
René Clément directed: The Walls of Malapaga (1949) and Forbidden Games (1952)

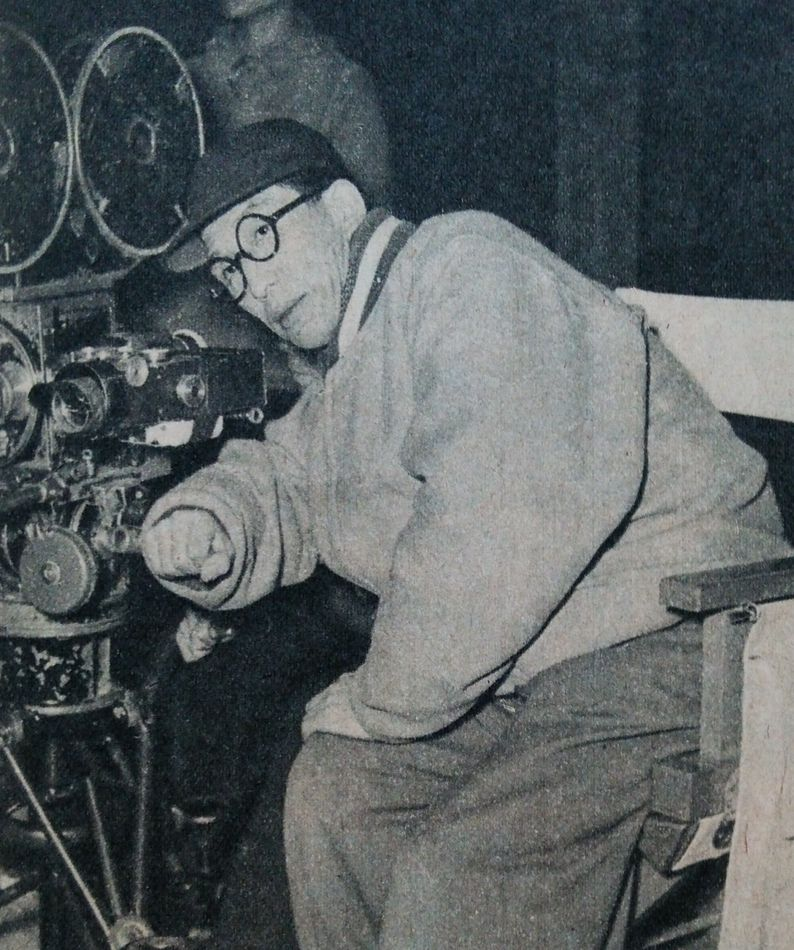
Teinosuke Kinugasa directed the winner Gate of Hell (1954)

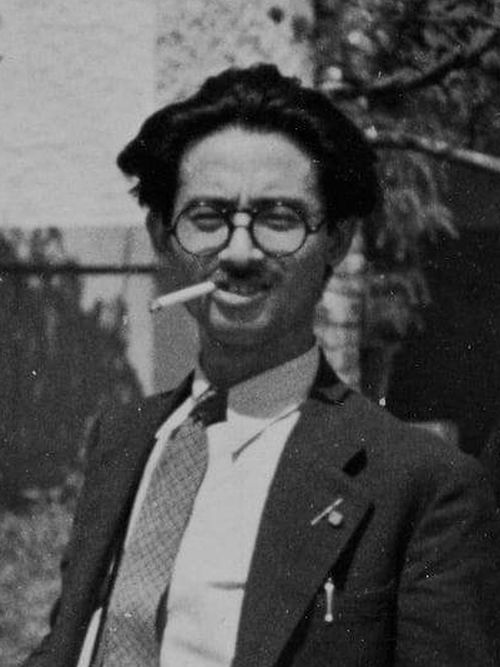
Hiroshi Inagaki directed the winner Samurai, The Legend of Musashi (1955)

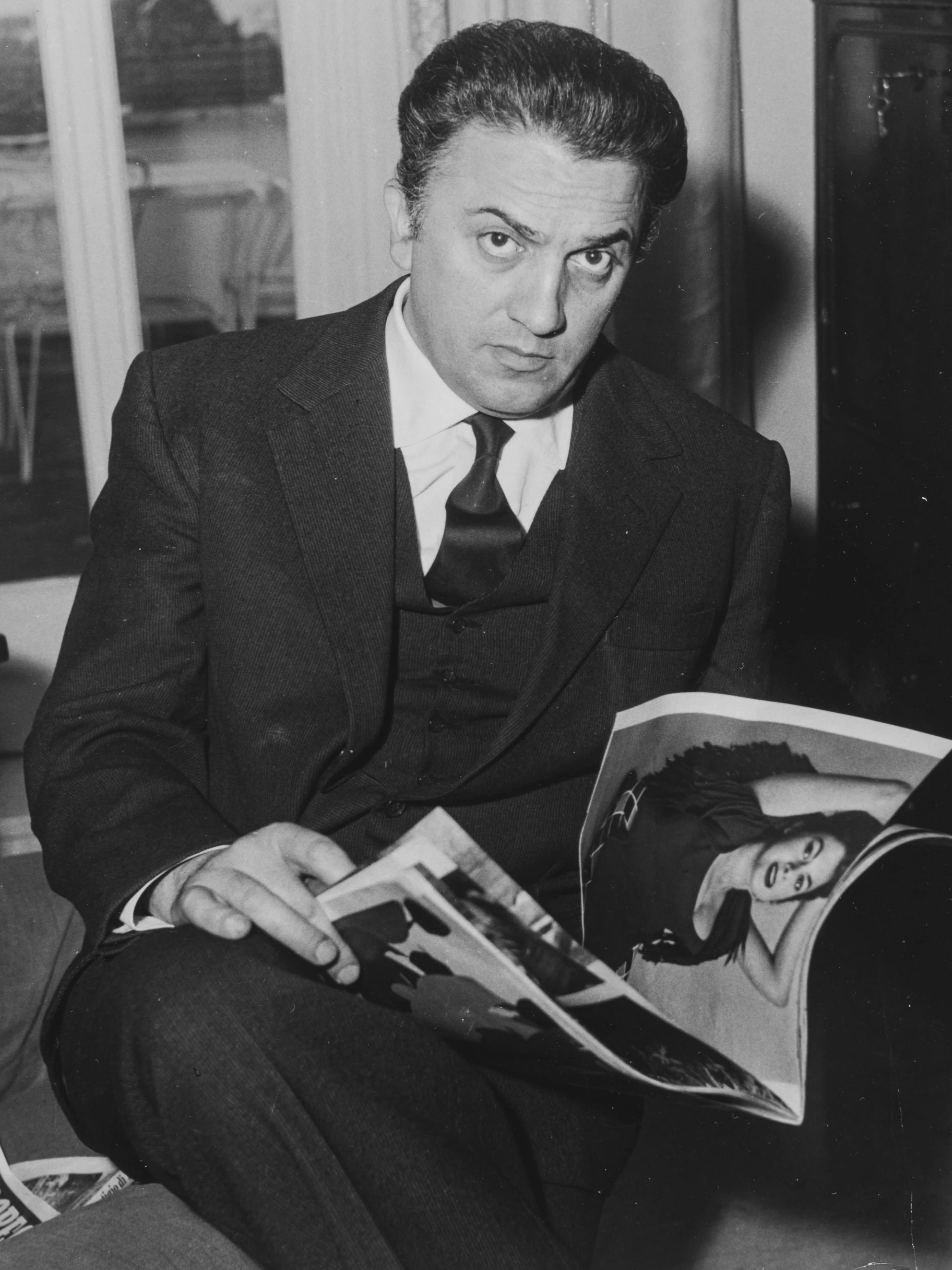
Federico Fellini directed four of the winners: La Strada (1956), Nights of Cabiria (1957), 8½ (1963) and Amarcord (1973)

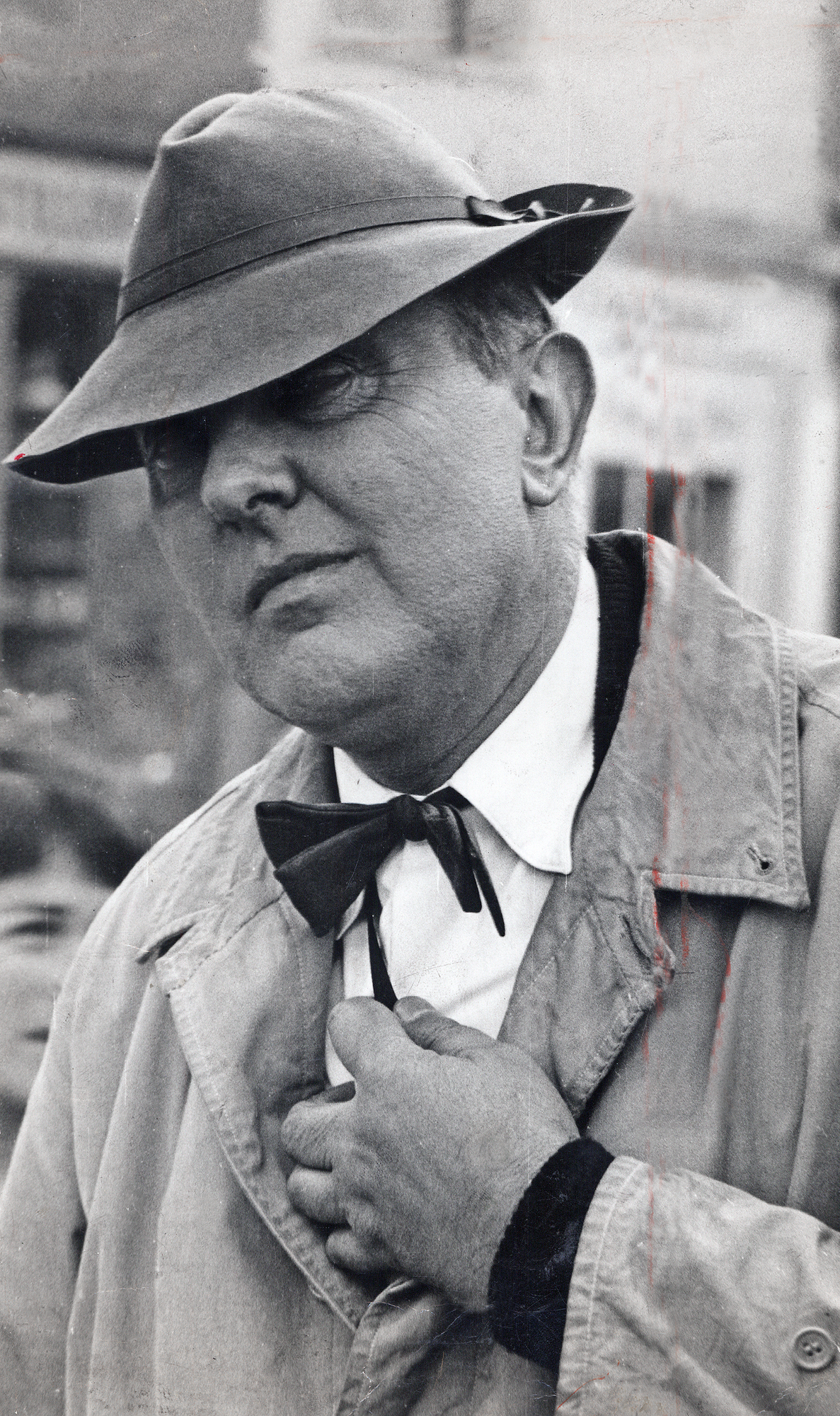
Jacques Tati directed the winner, Mon Oncle (1958)

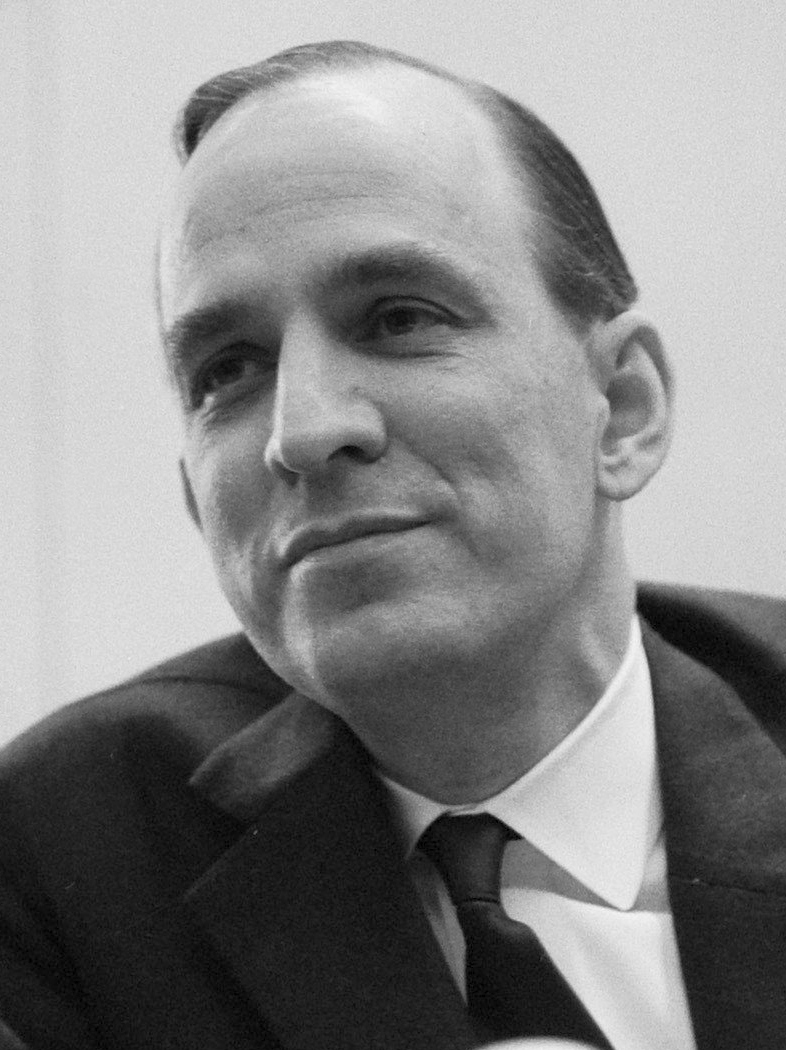
Ingmar Bergman directed three of the winners: The Virgin Spring (1960), Through a Glass Darkly (1961) and Fanny and Alexander (1982).

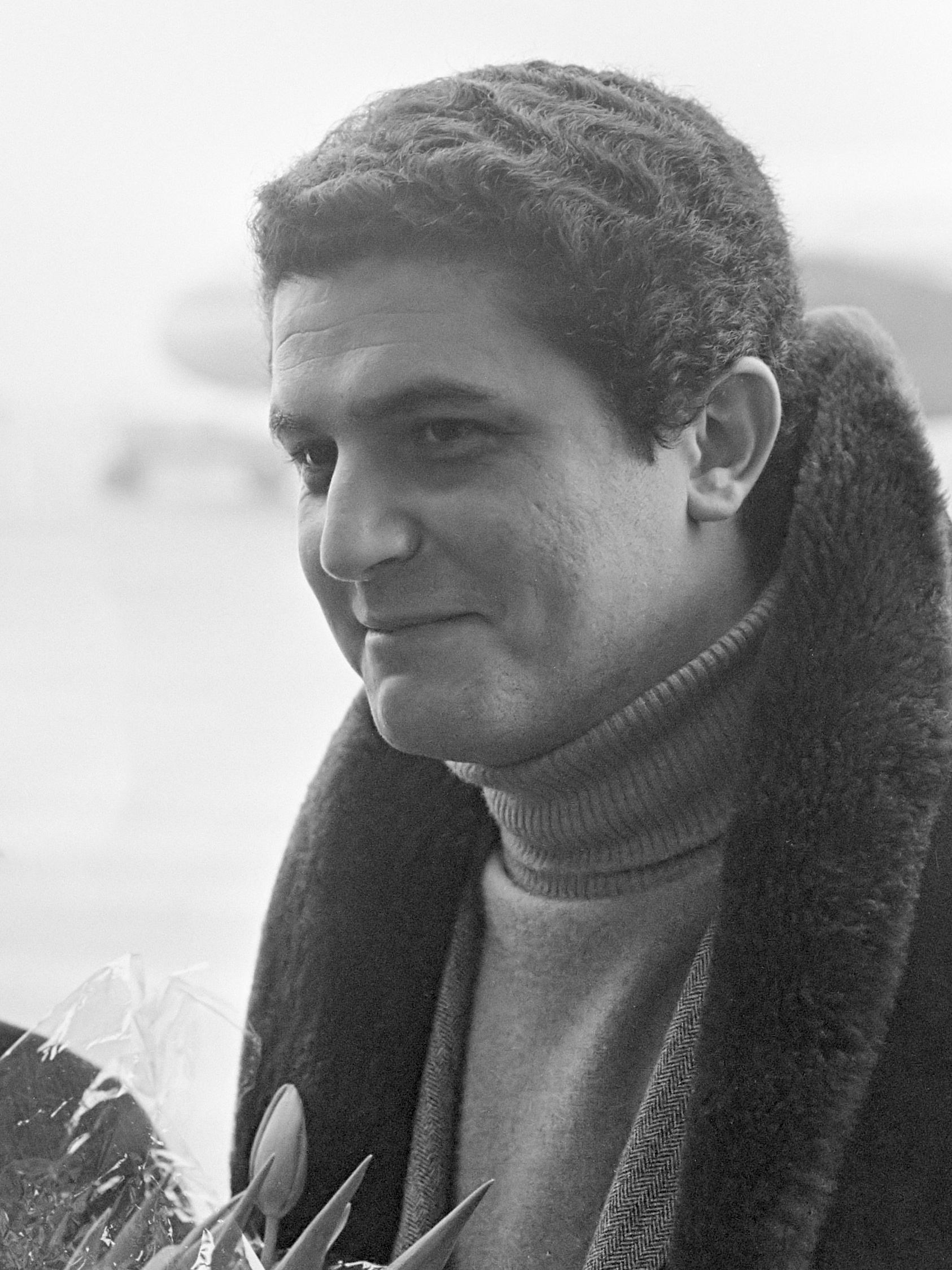
Claude Lelouch directed the winner A Man and a Woman (1966).

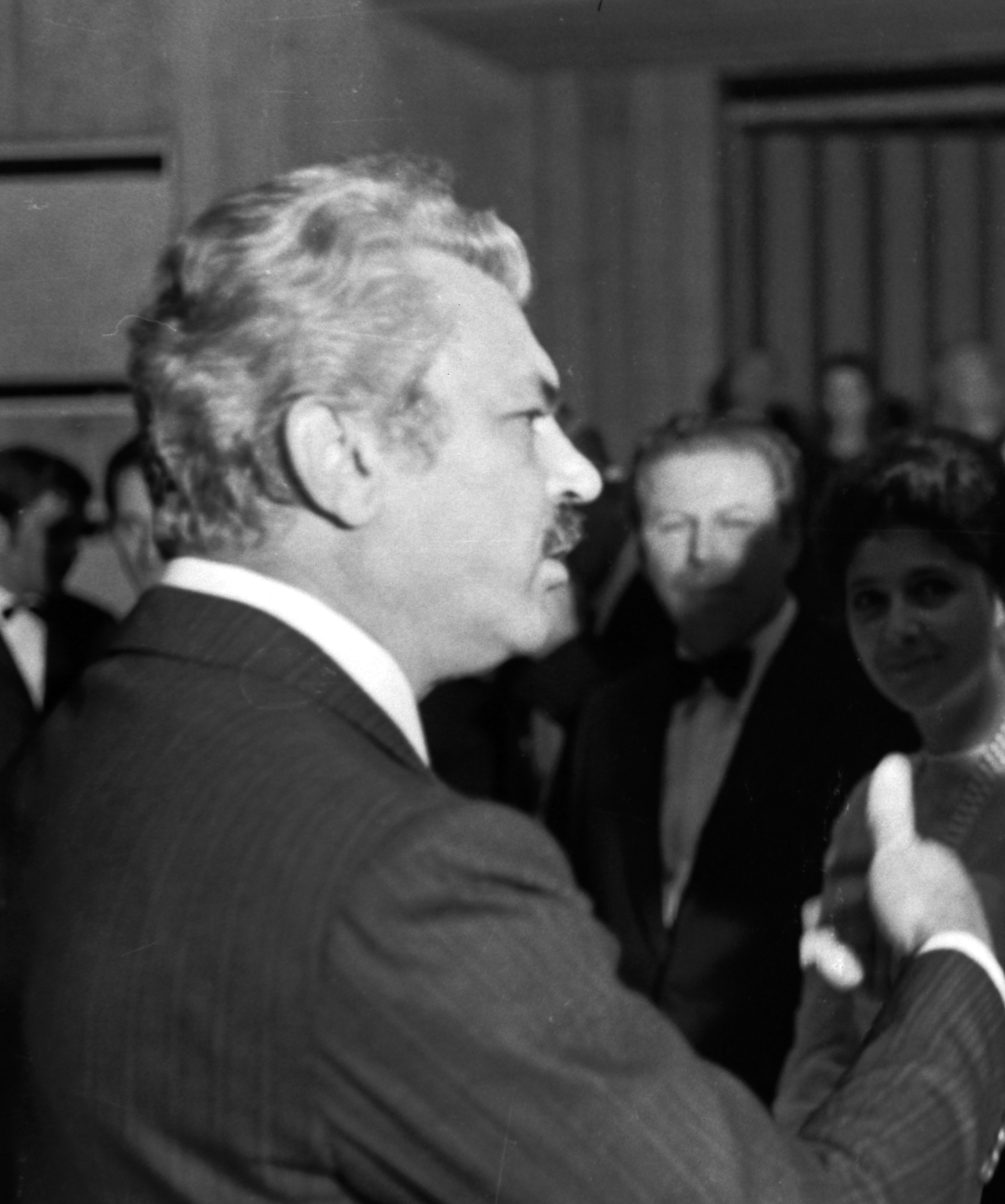
Sergei Bondarchuk directed the winner War and Peace (1968).

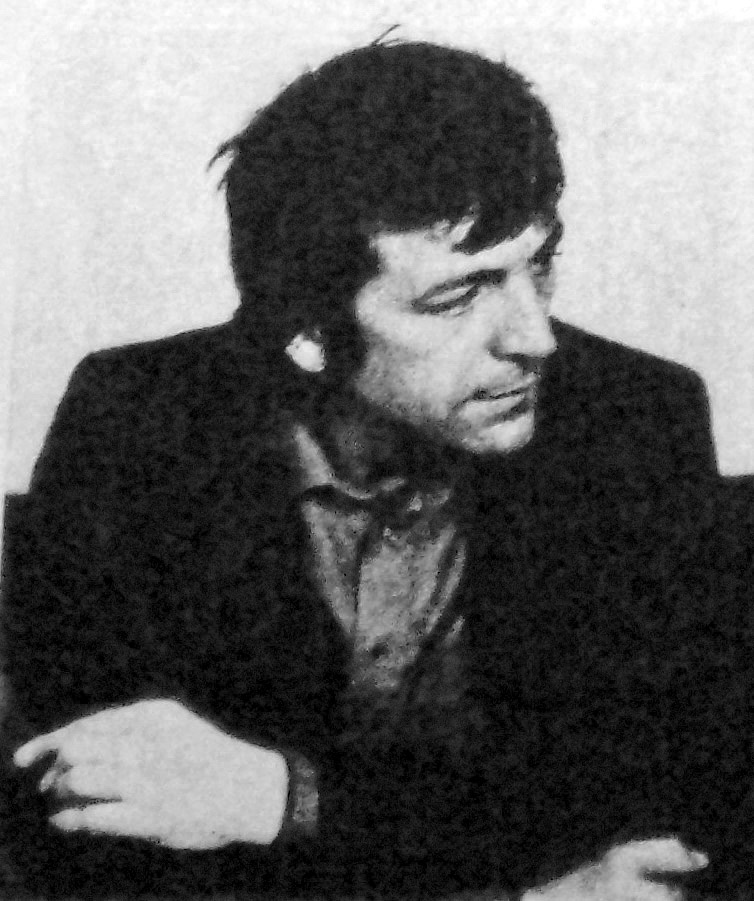
Costa-Gavras directed the winner Z (1969)

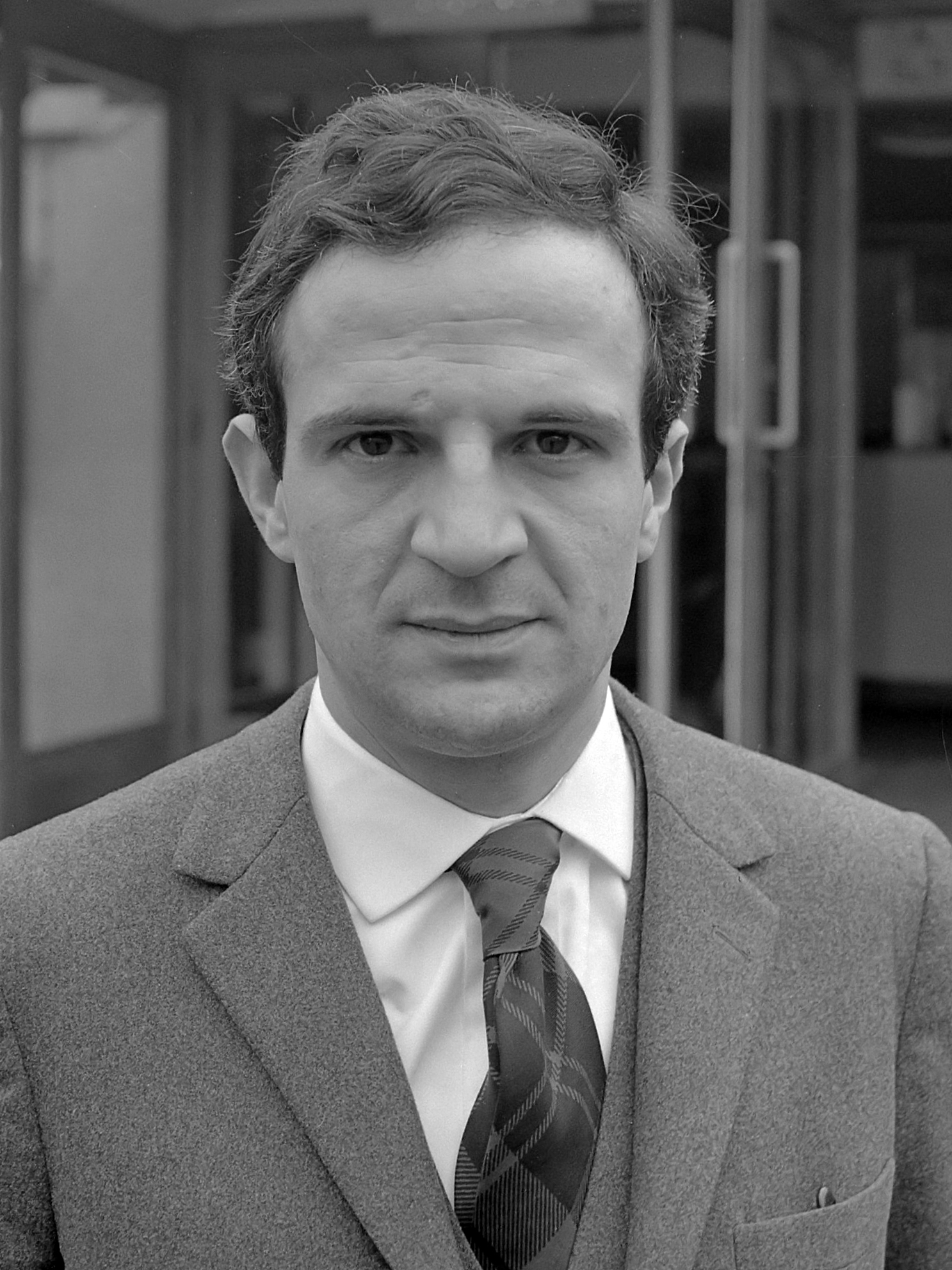
François Truffaut directed the winner Day for Night (1973)

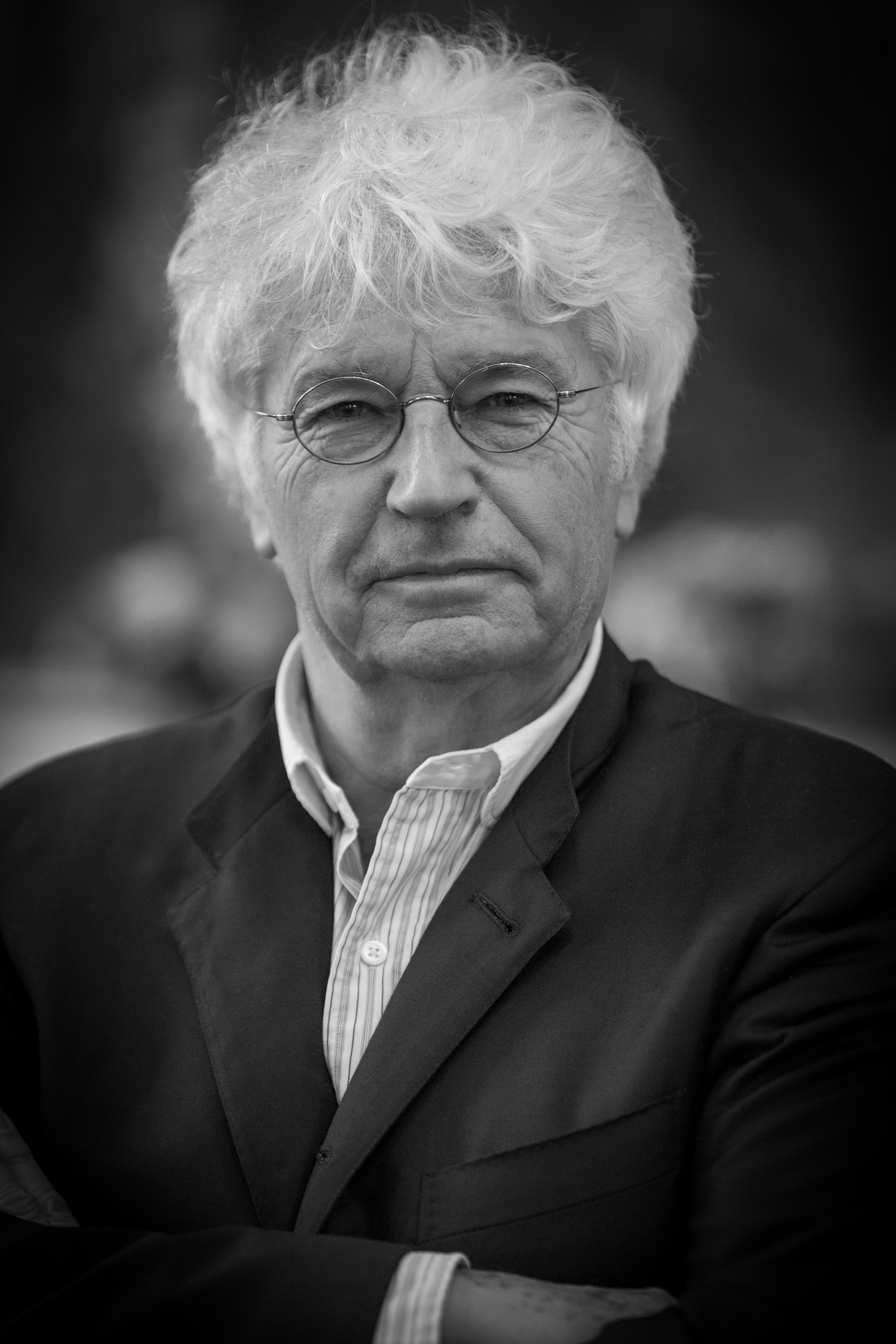
Jean-Jacques Annaud directed the winner Black and White in Color (1976)

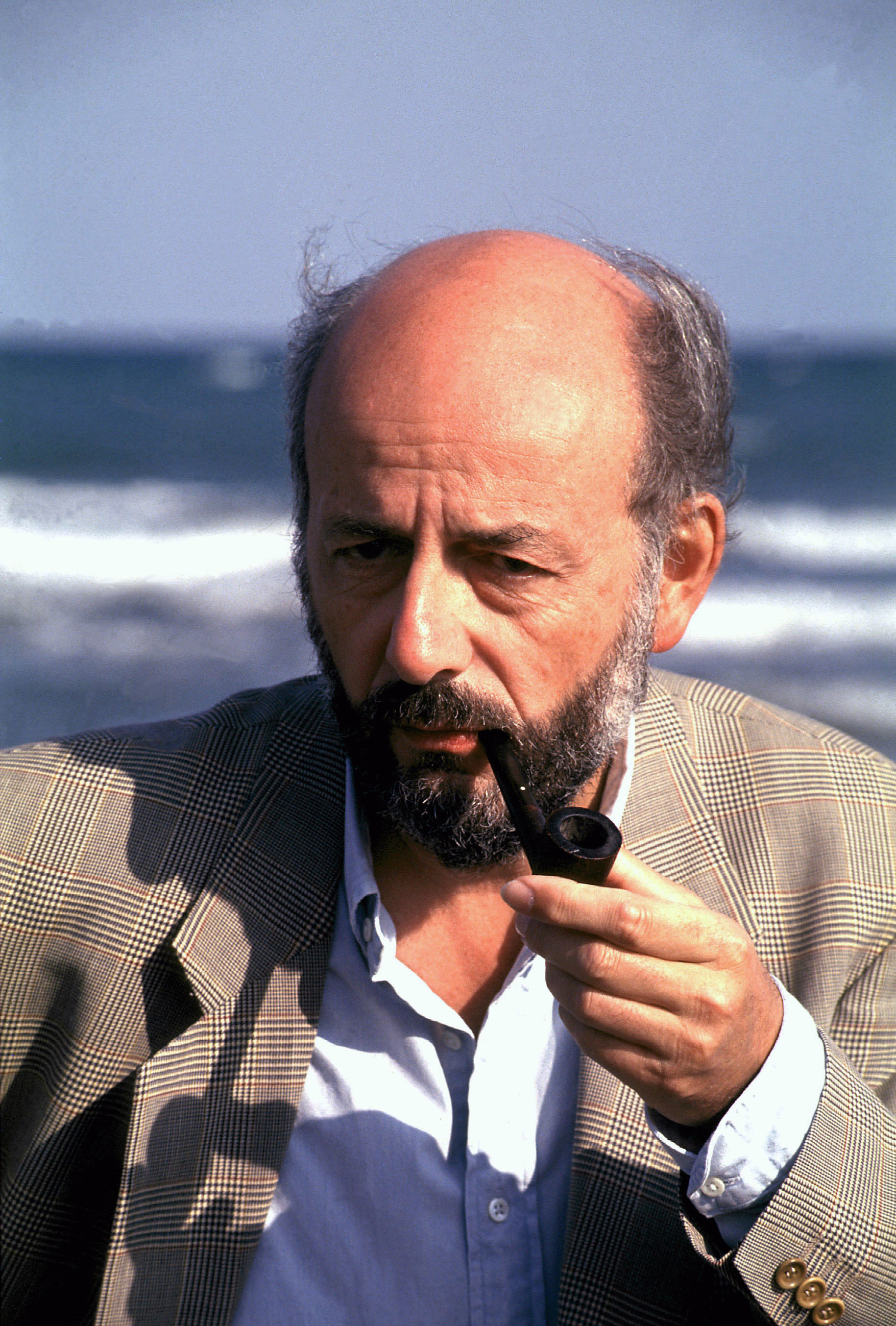
Bertrand Blier directed the winner Get Out Your Handkerchiefs (1978)

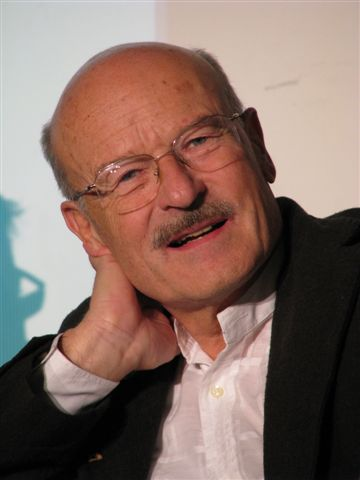
Volker Schlöndorff directed the winner The Tin Drum (1979).

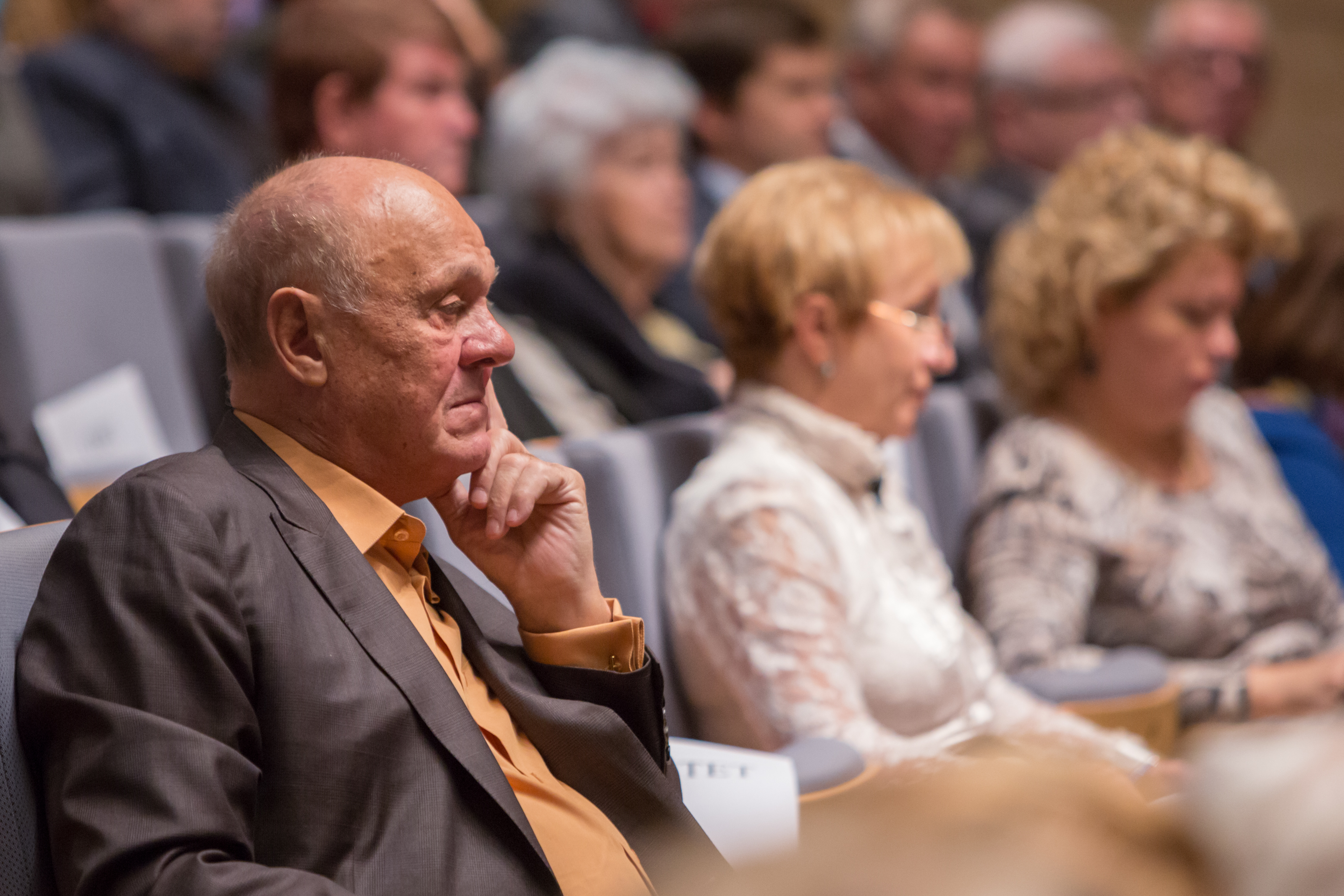
Vladimir Menshov directed the winner Moscow Does Not Believe in Tears (1980).

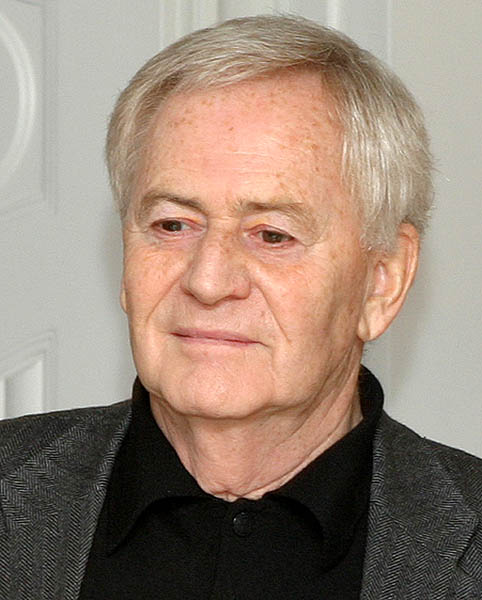
István Szabó directed the winner Mephisto (1981).

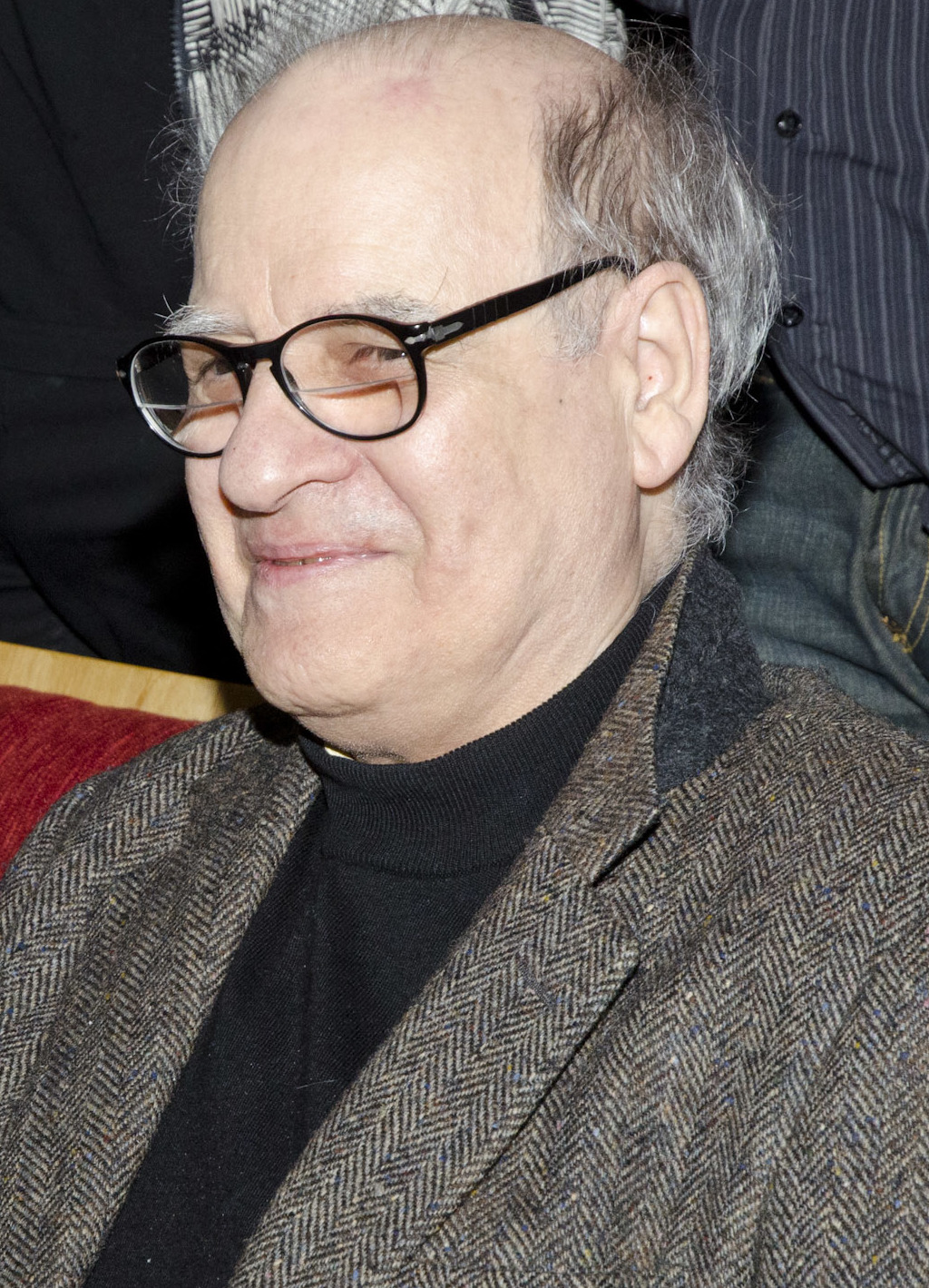
Luis Puenzo directed the winner The Official Story (1985).

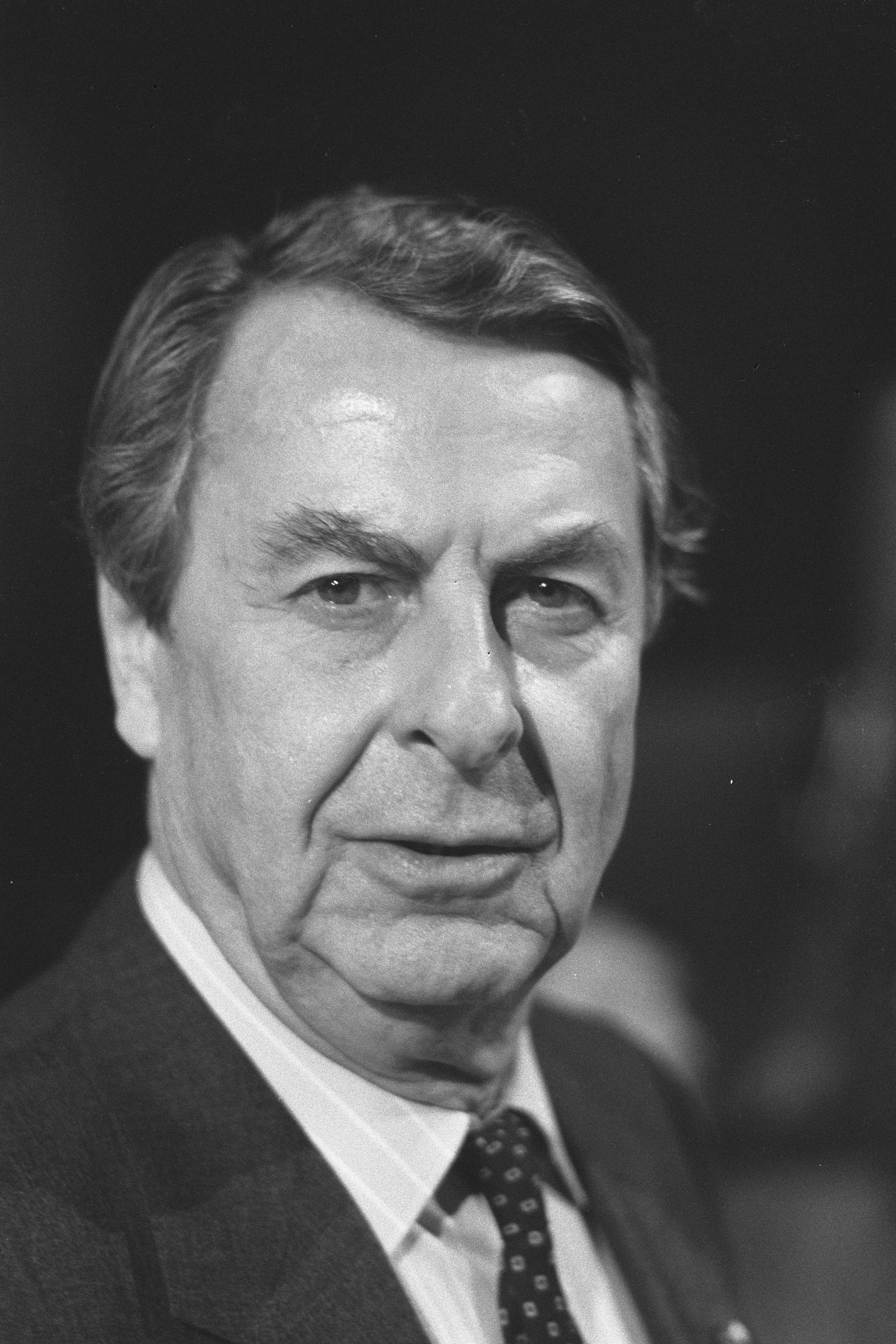
Fons Rademakers directed the winner The Assault (1986).

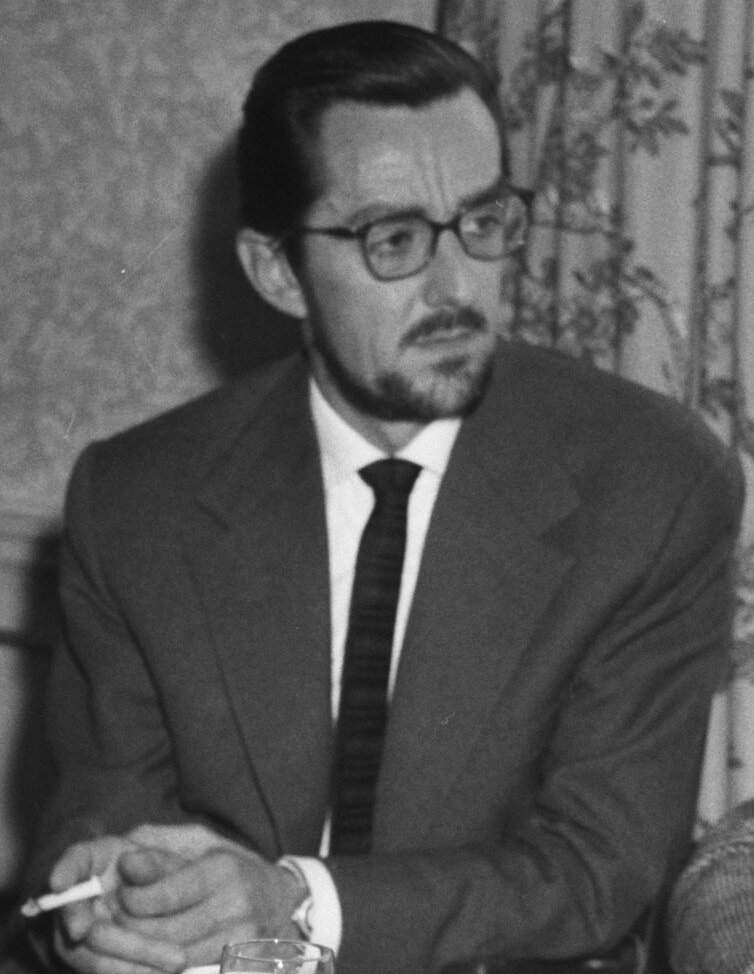
Gabriel Axel directed the winner Babette's Feast (1987).

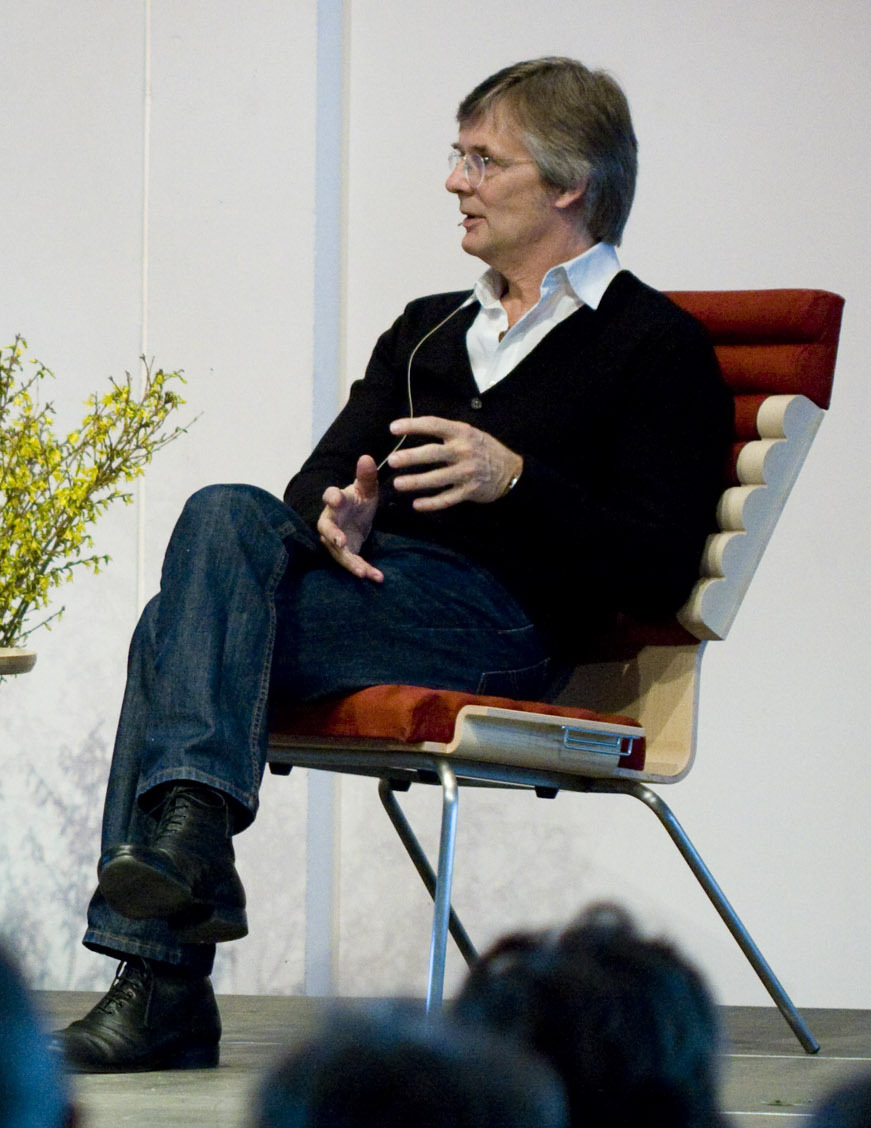
Bille August directed the winner Pelle the Conqueror (1988).

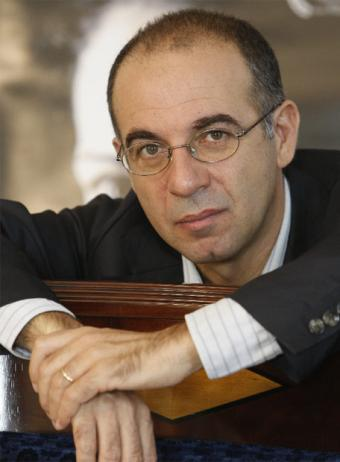
Giuseppe Tornatore directed the winner Cinema Paradiso (1989).

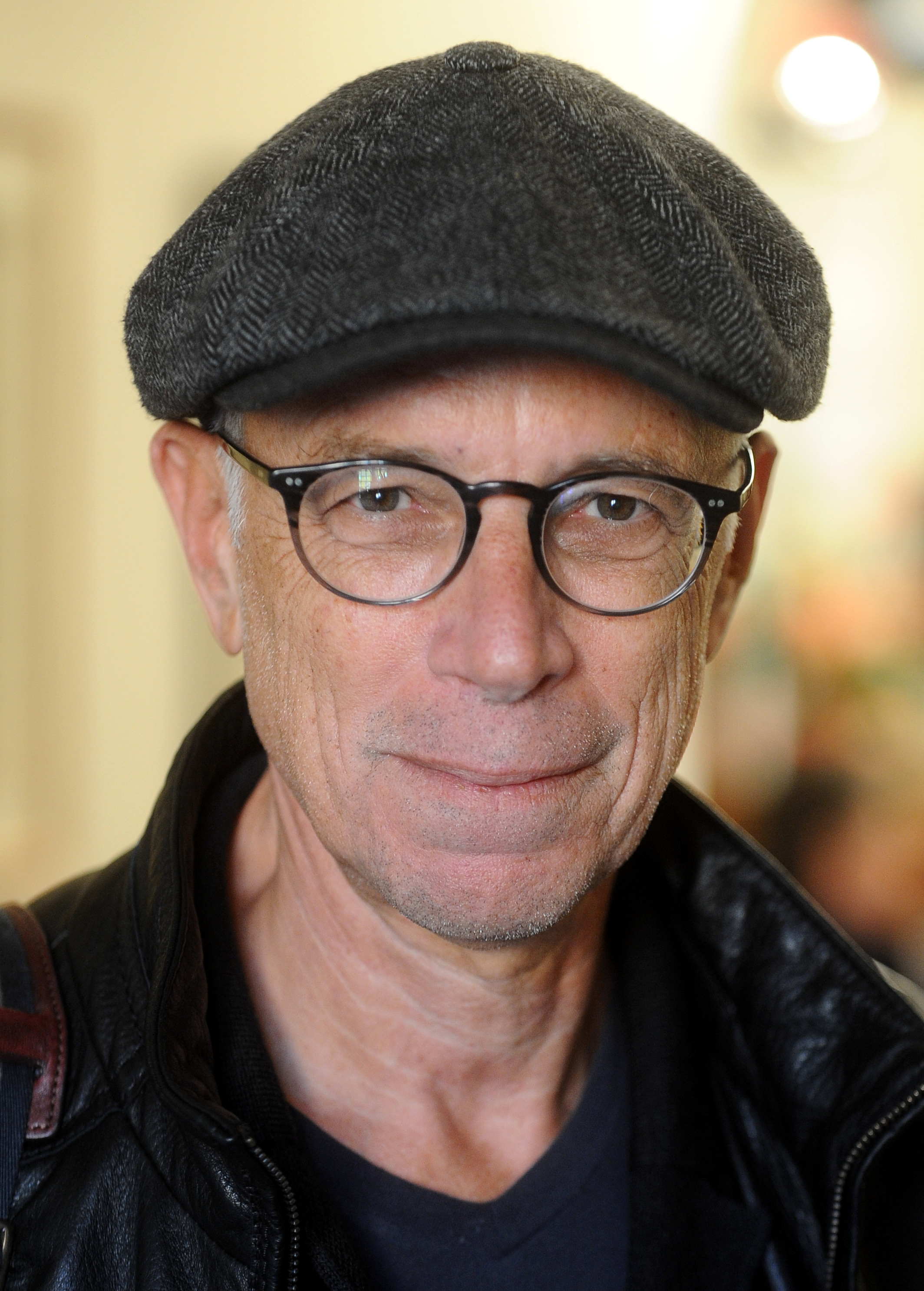
Gabriele Salvatores directed the winner Mediterraneo (1991).

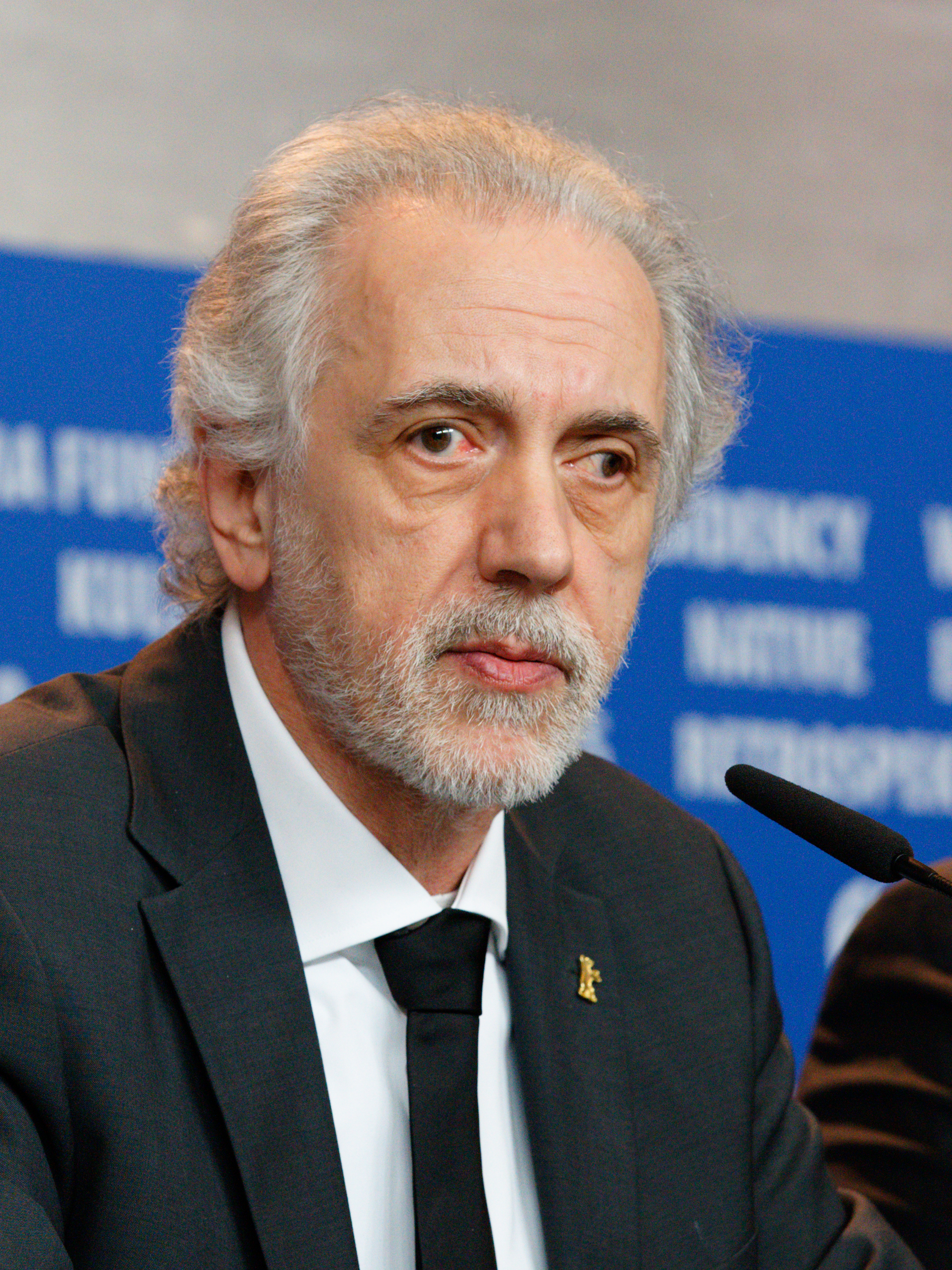
Fernando Trueba directed the winner Belle Époque (1993).

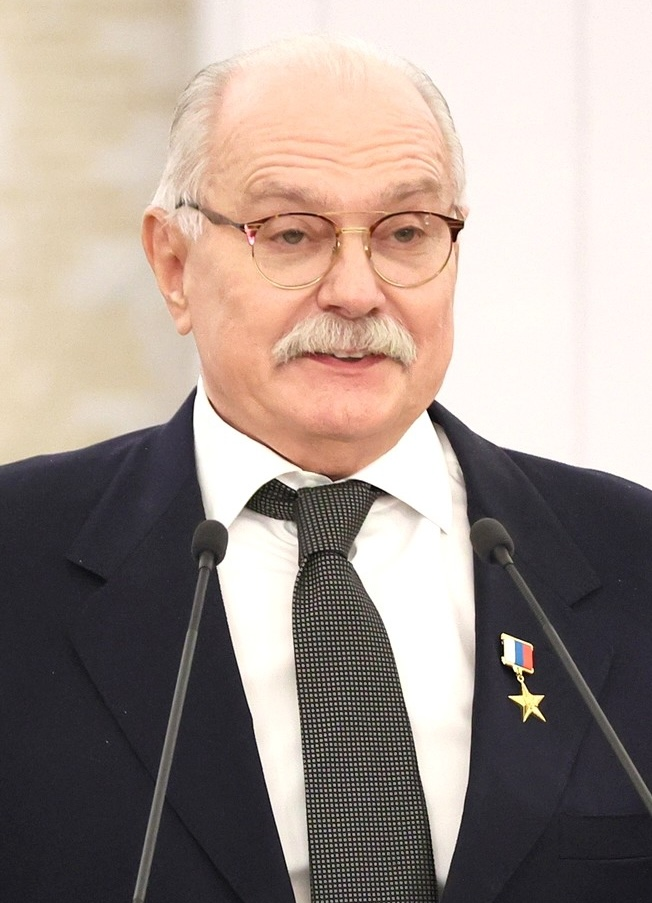
Nikita Mikhalkov directed the winner Burnt by the Sun (1994).

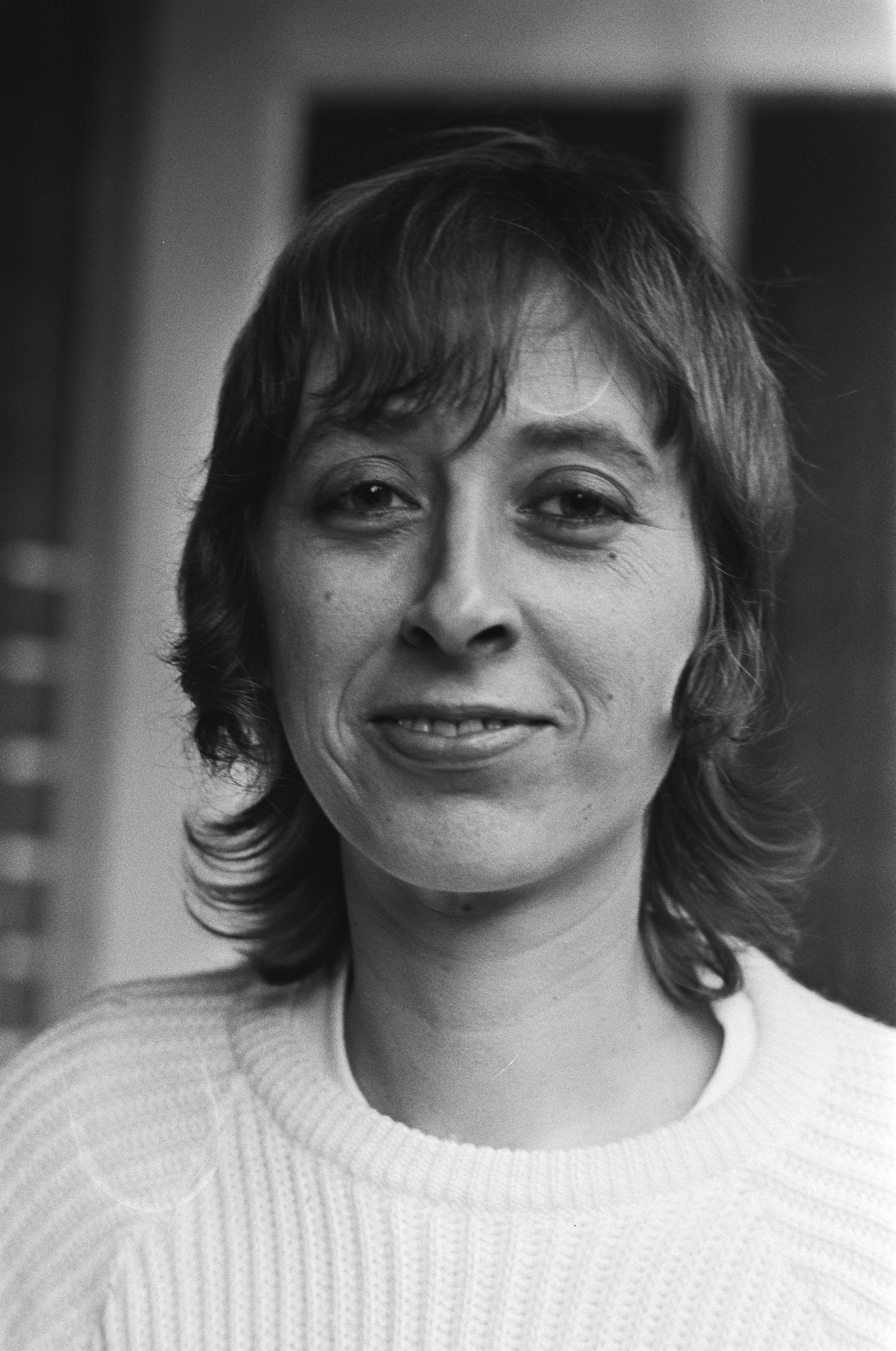
Marleen Gorris directed Antonia's Line (1995). (Note: Marleen Gorris is the first woman to have directed a winner in this category.)

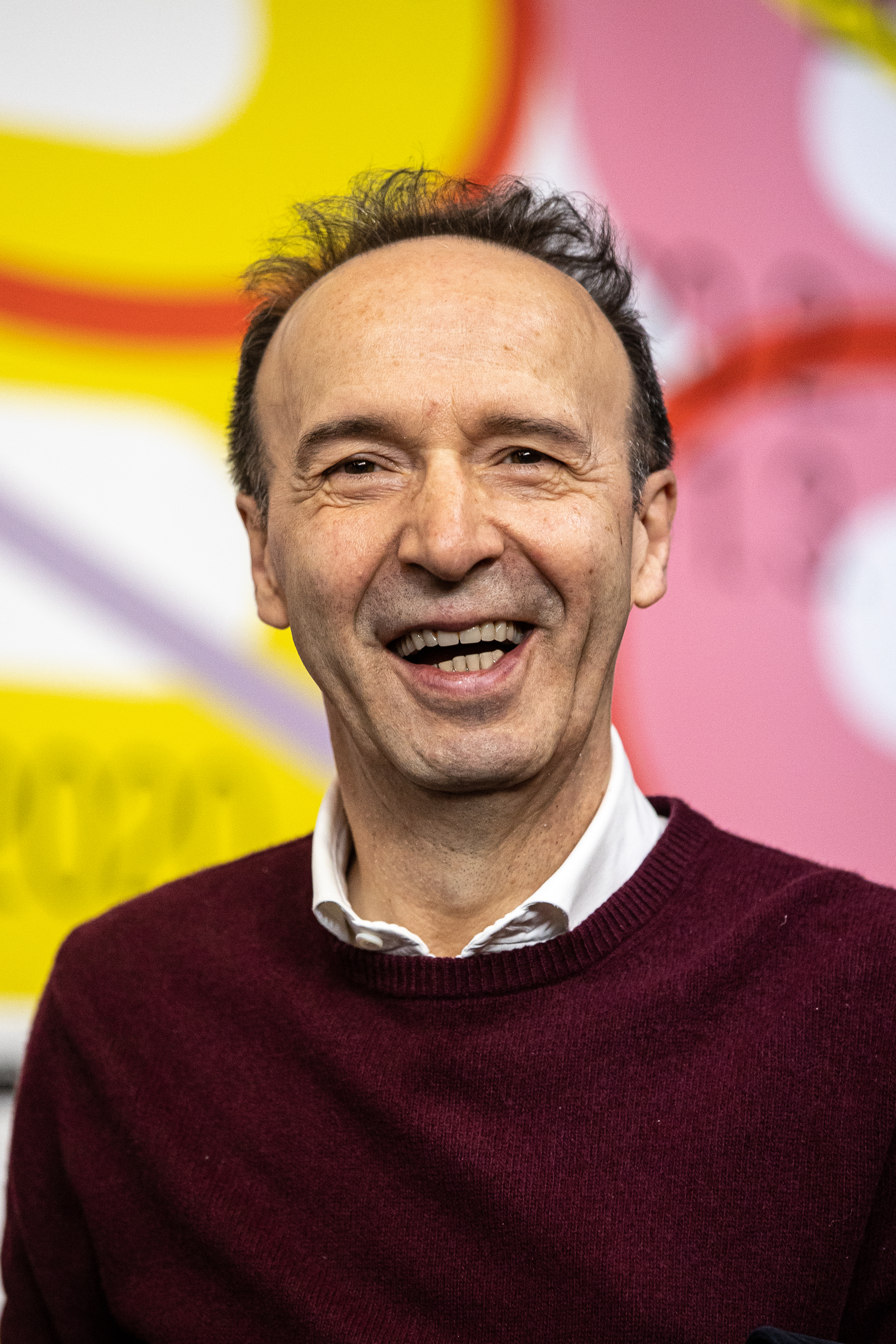
Roberto Benigni directed the winner Life Is Beautiful (1998) (Note: that same year he won the Academy Award for Best Actor for the same film.)

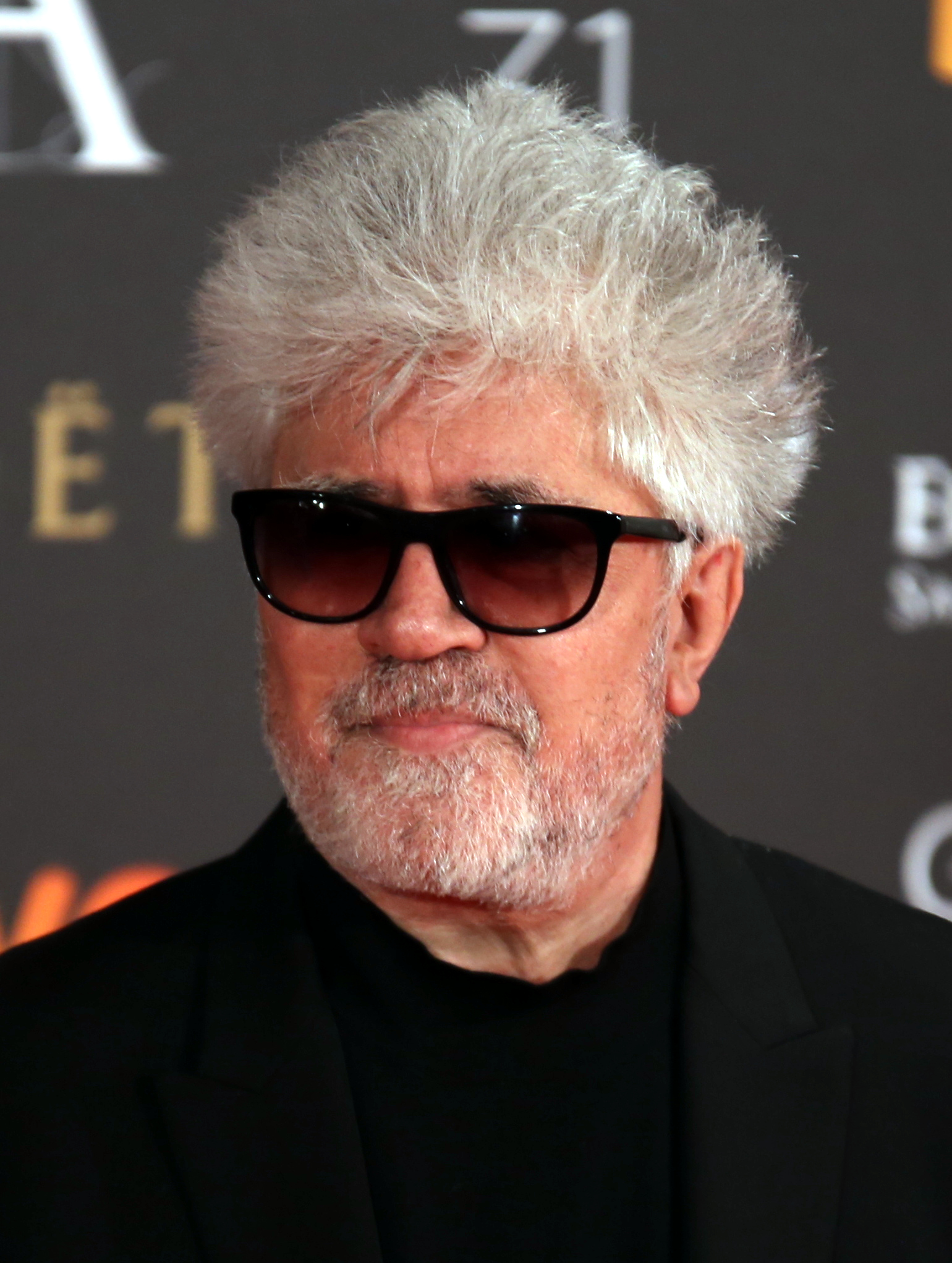
Pedro Almodóvar directed the winner All About My Mother (1999).

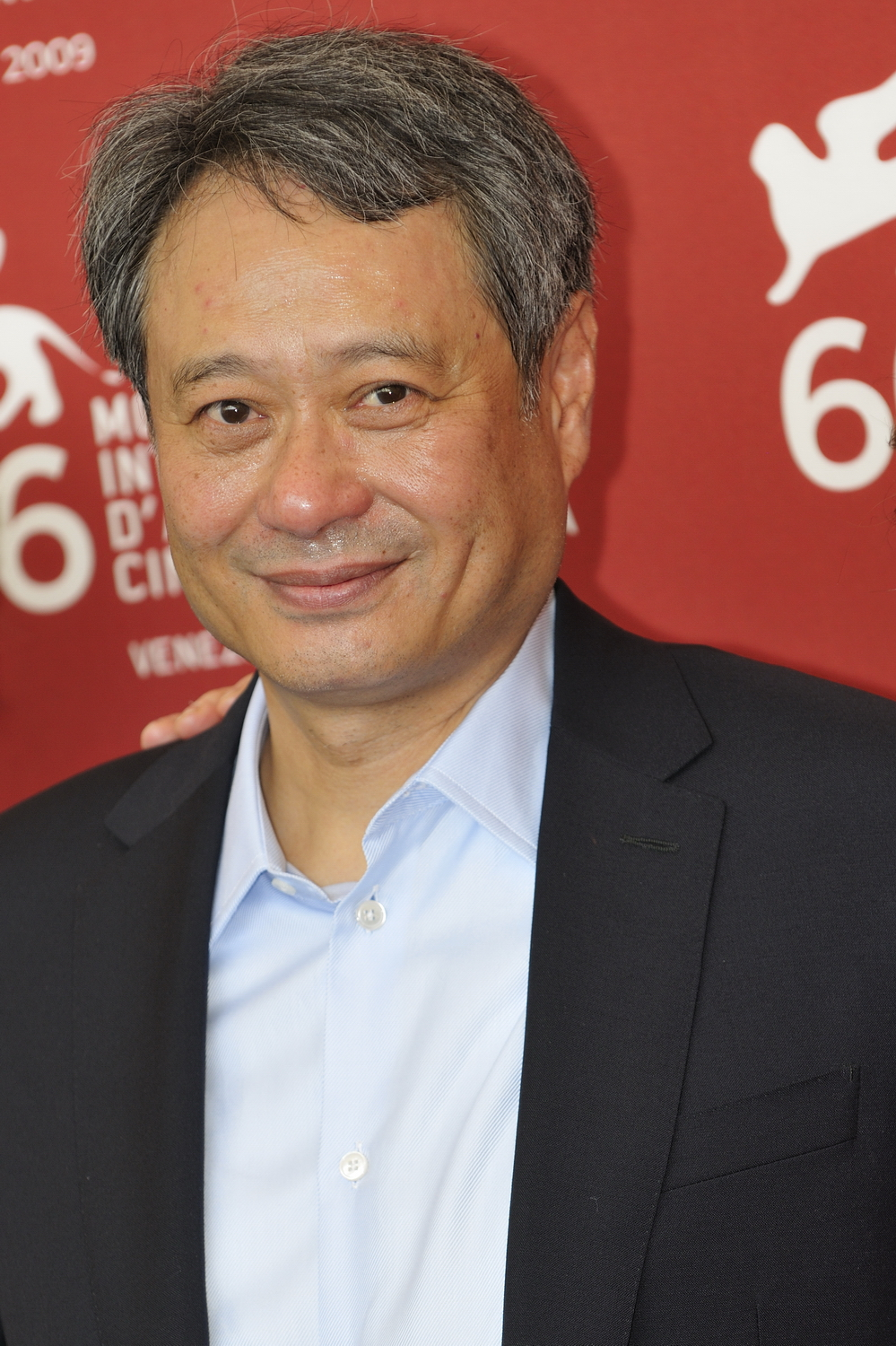
Ang Lee directed the winner Crouching Tiger, Hidden Dragon (2000).

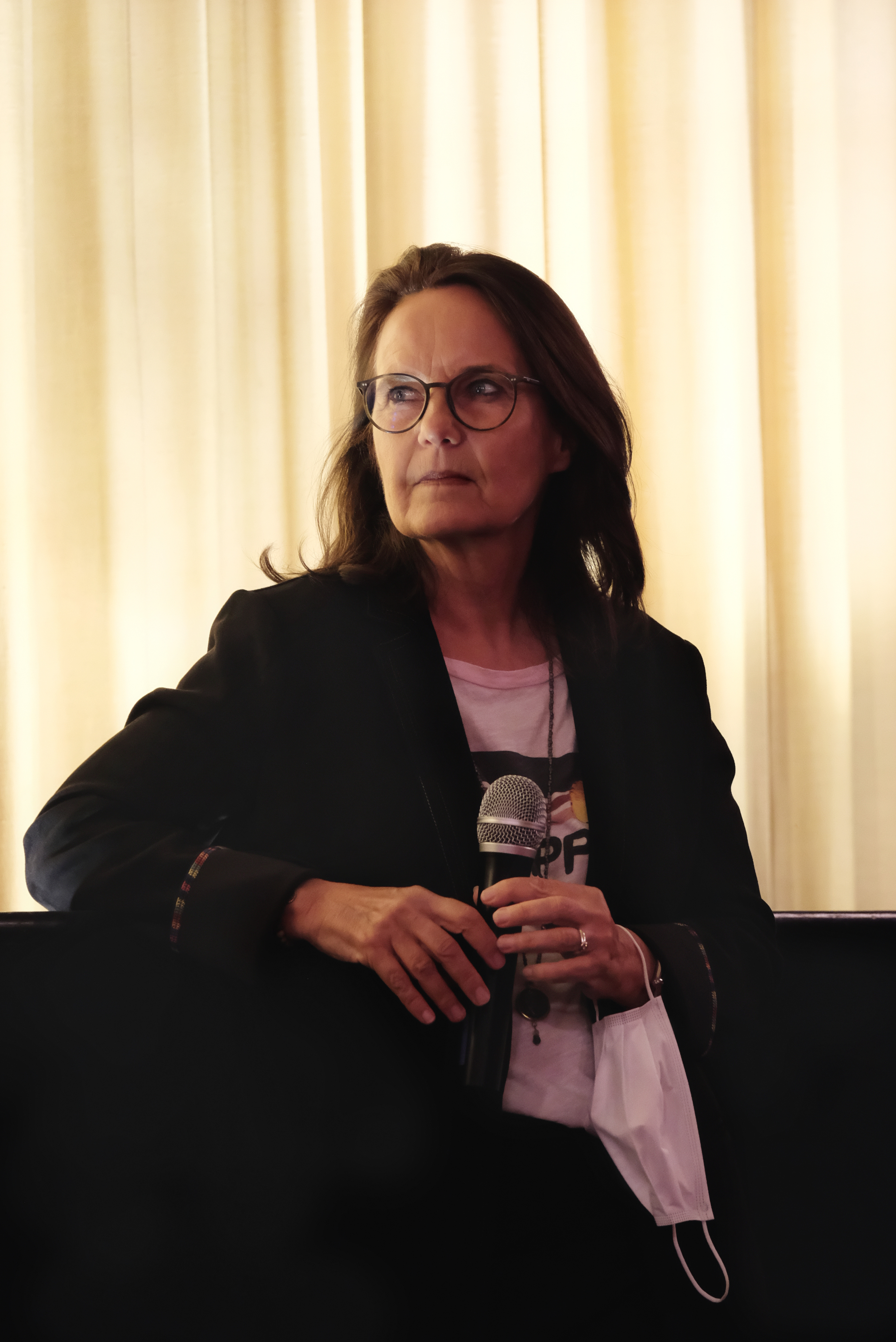
Caroline Link directed the winner Nowhere in Africa (2002).

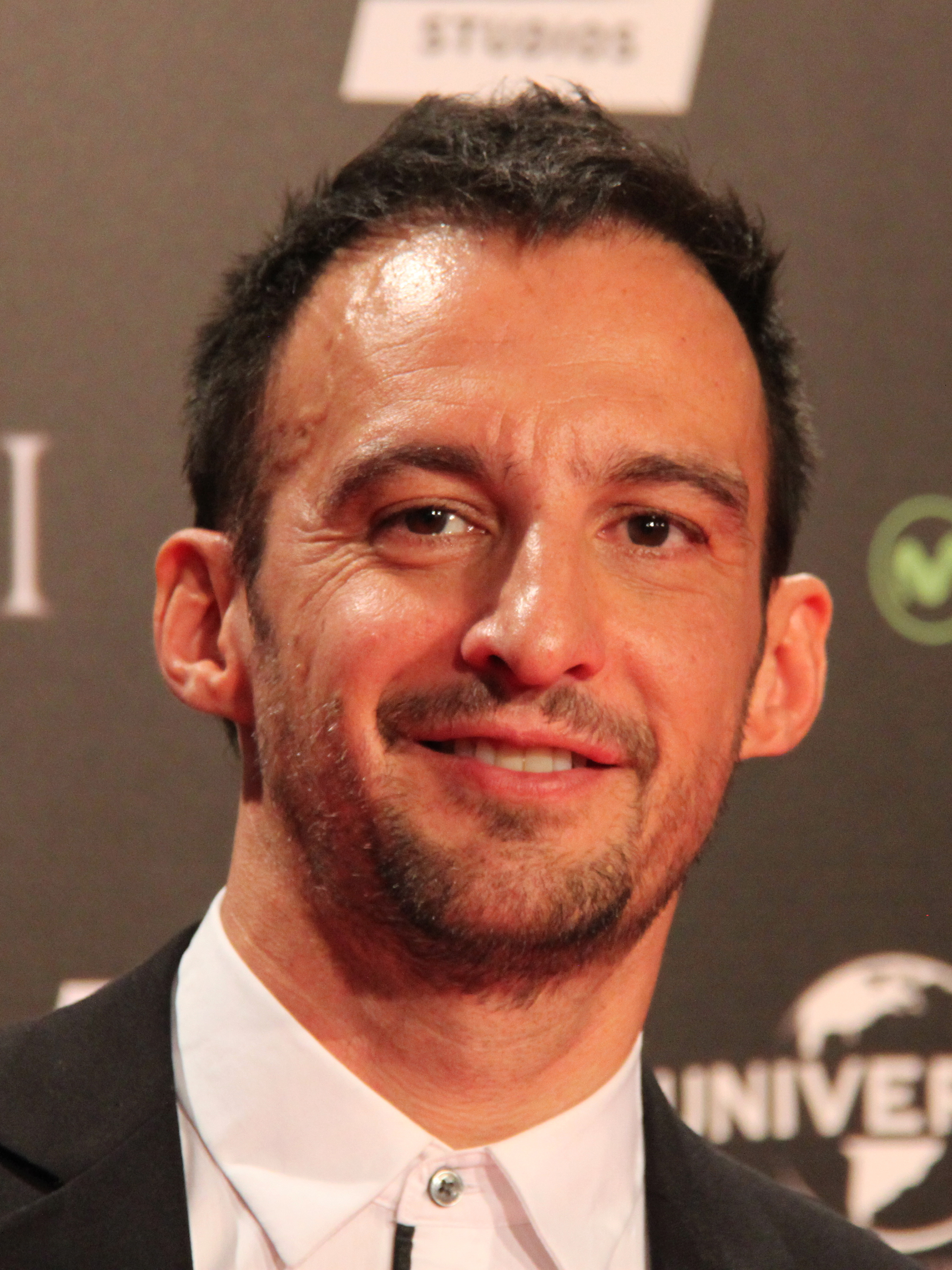
Alejandro Amenábar directed the winner for The Sea Inside (2004).

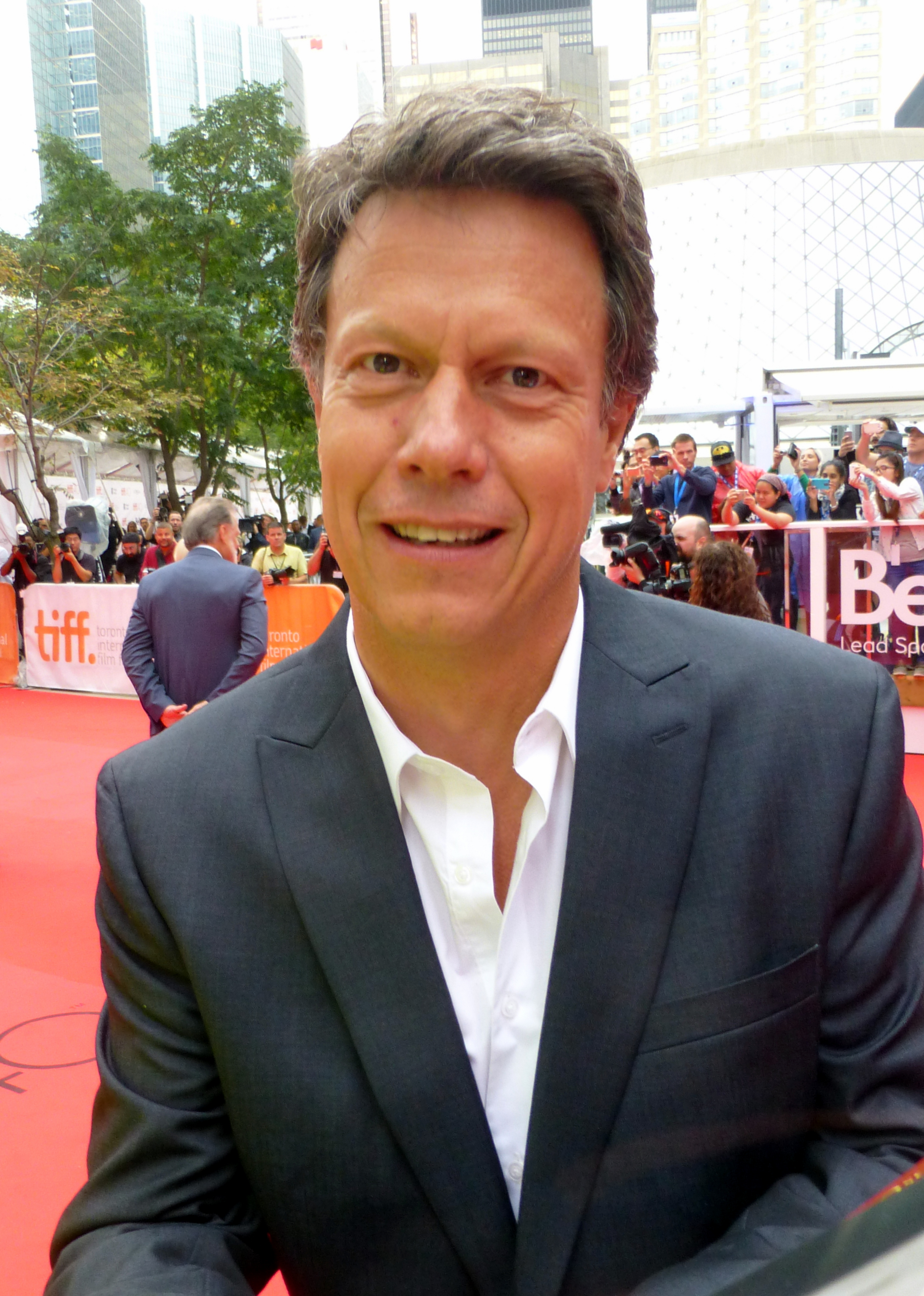
Gavin Hood directed the winner Tsotsi (2005).

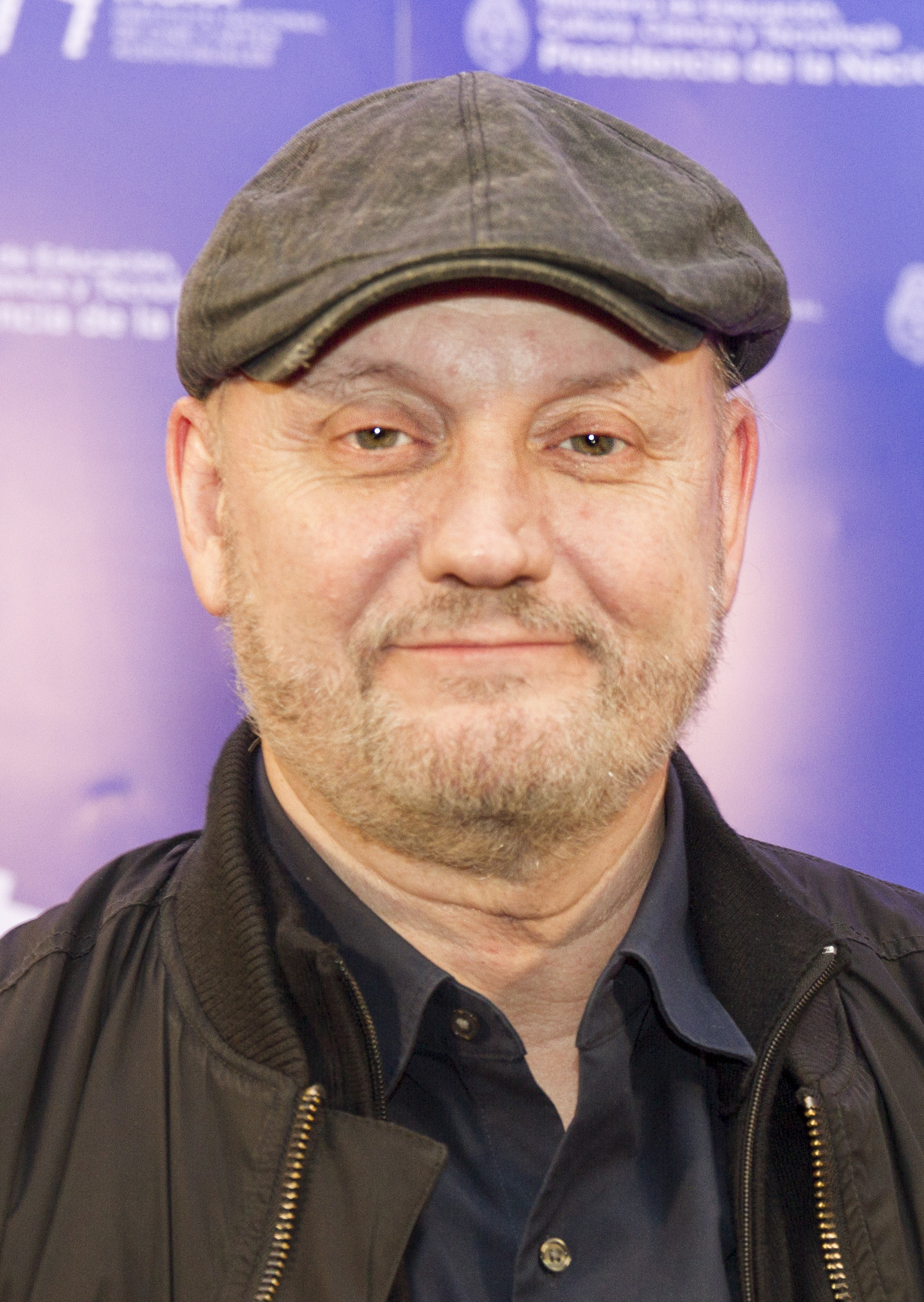
Juan José Campanella directed the winner The Secret in Their Eyes (2009).

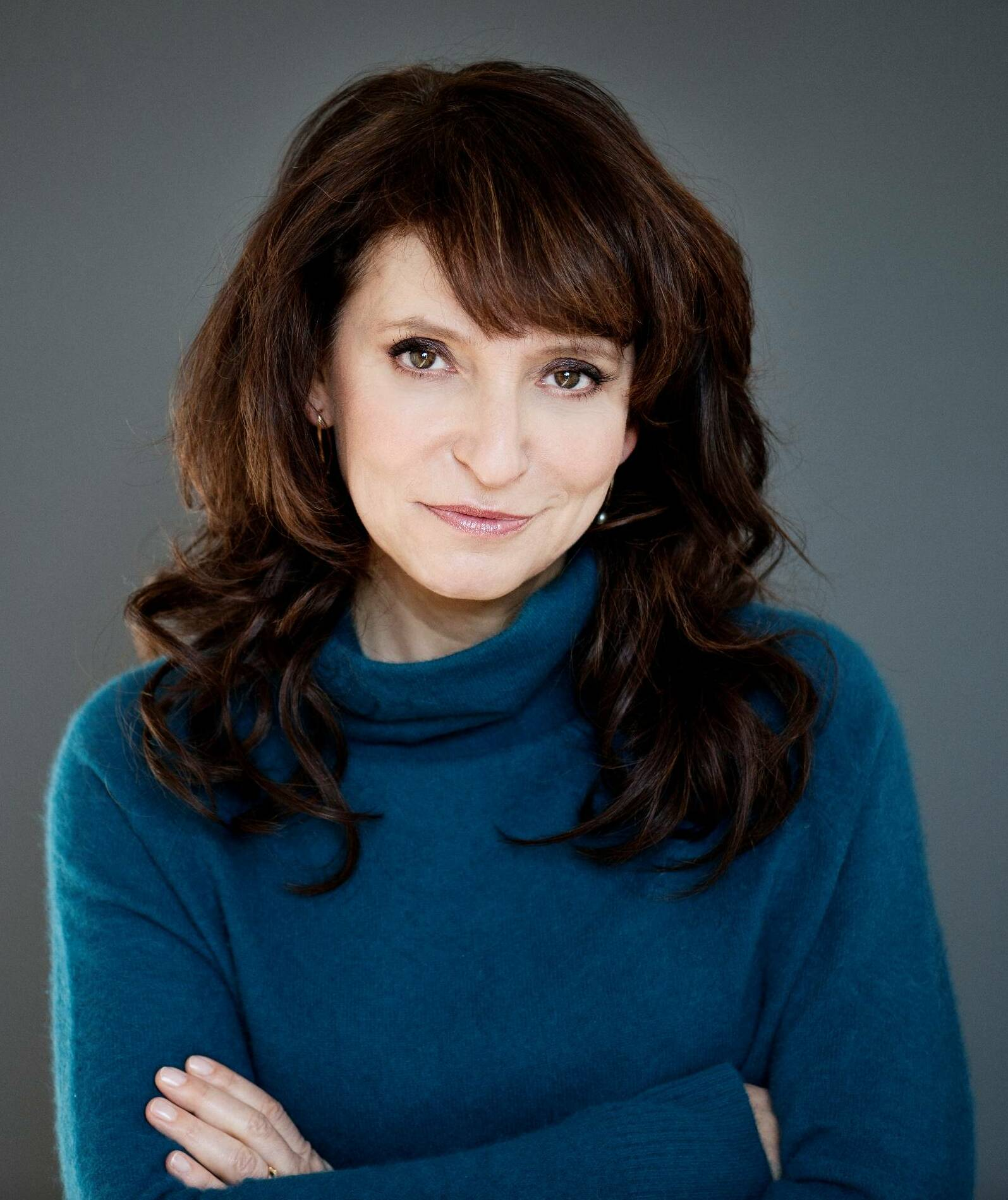
Susanne Bier directed the winner In a Better World (2010).

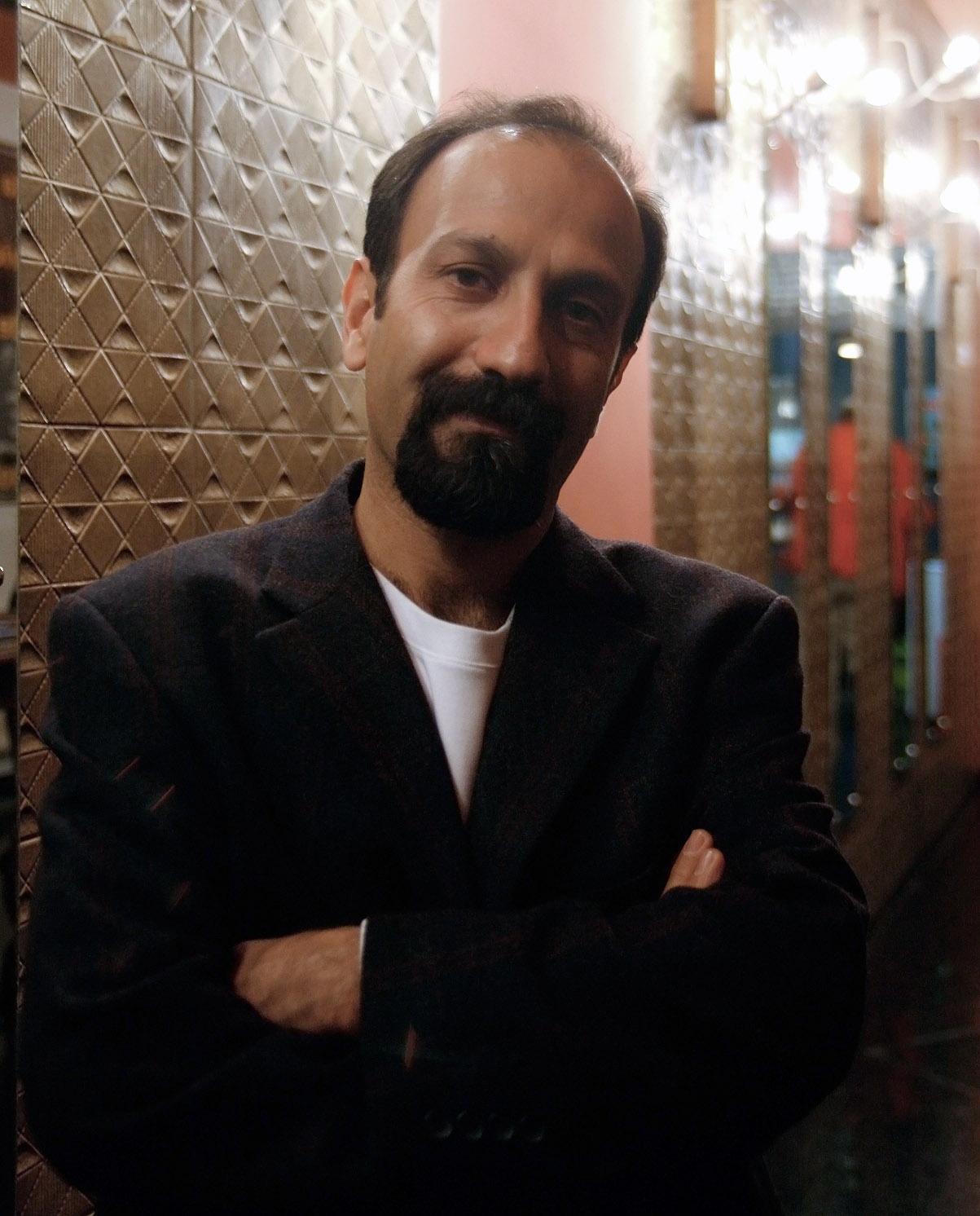
Asghar Farhadi directed two films which won this category: A Separation (2011) and The Salesman (2016).

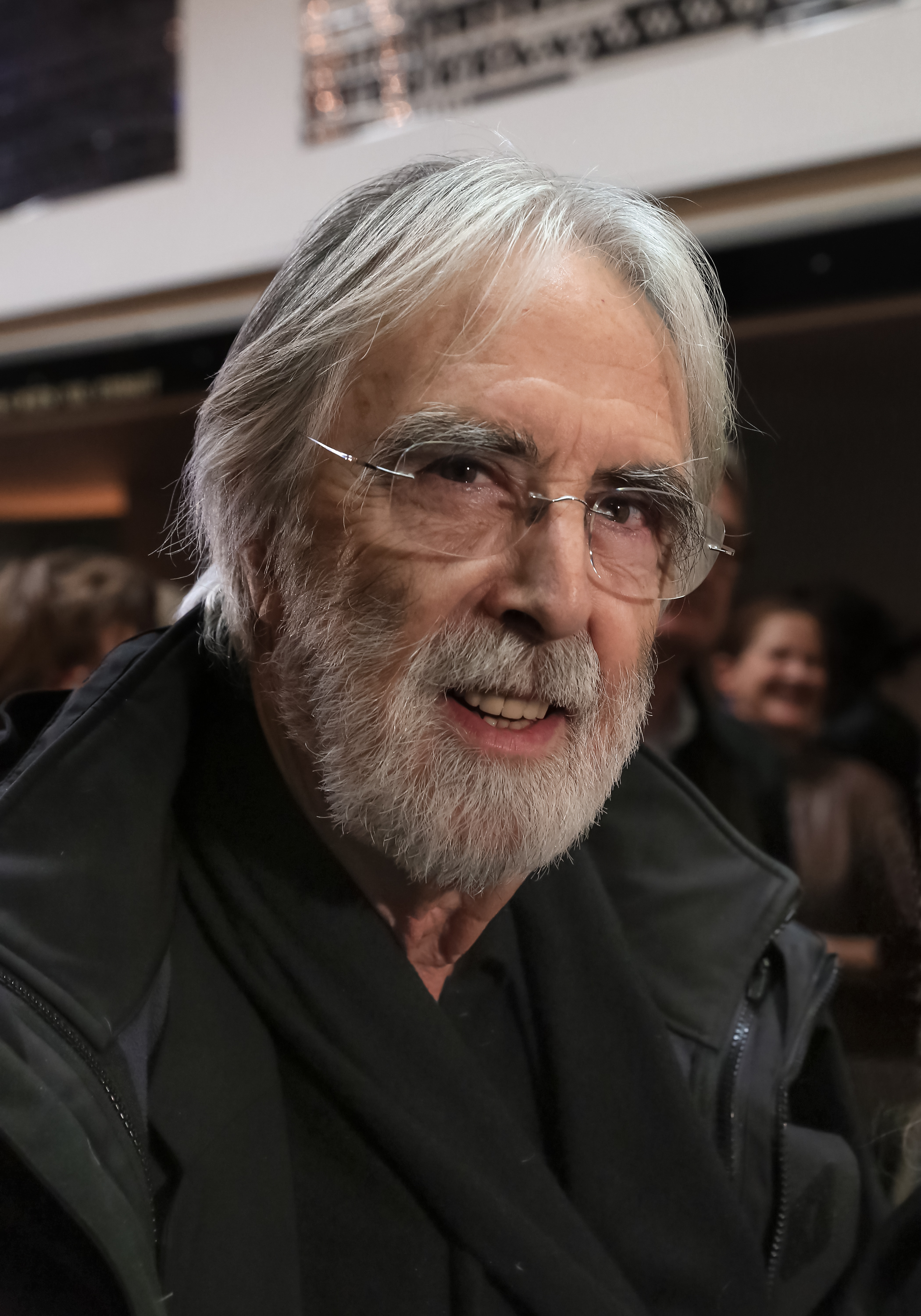
Michael Haneke directed the winner Amour (2012).

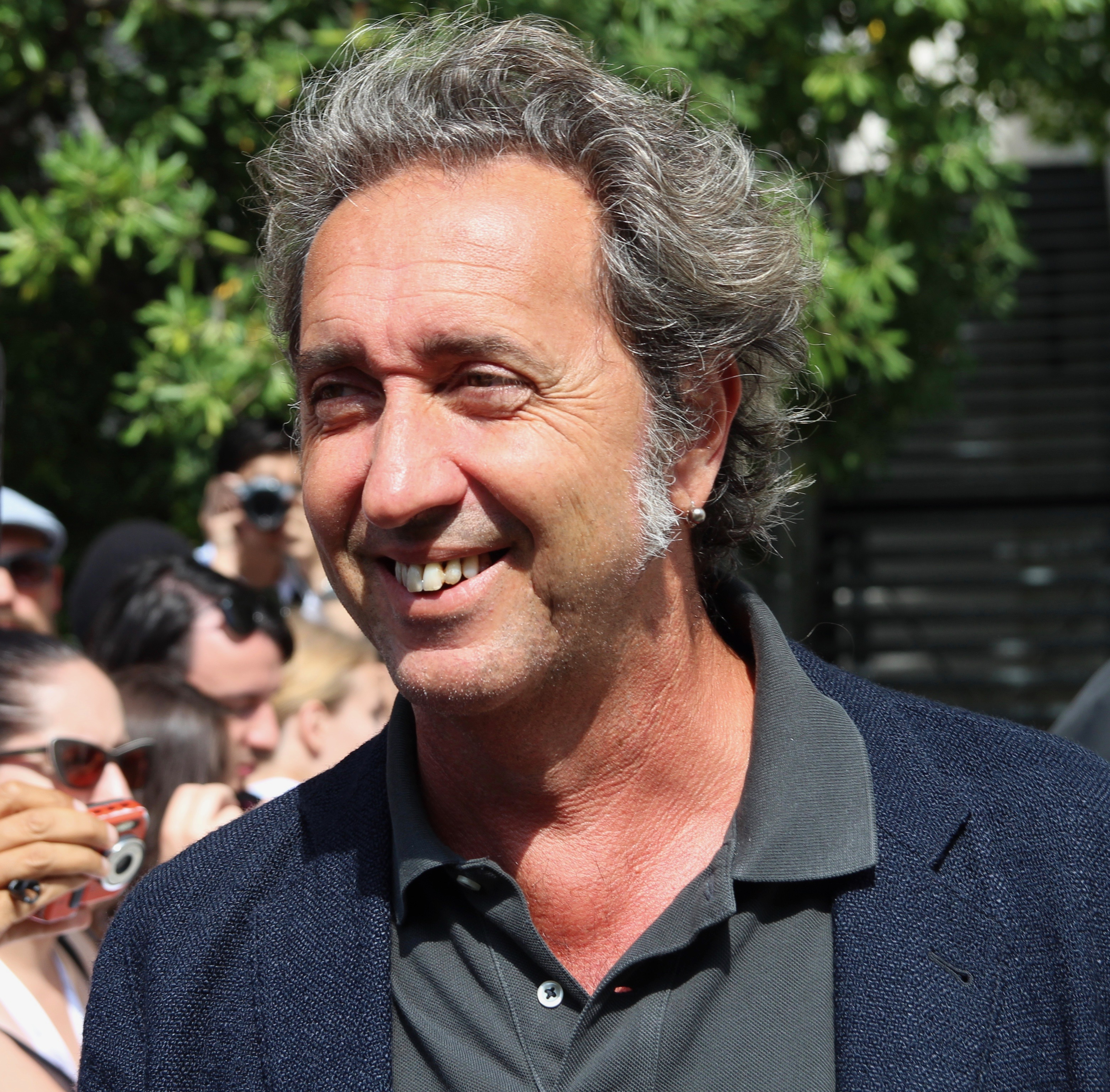
Paolo Sorrentino directed the winner The Great Beauty (2013).

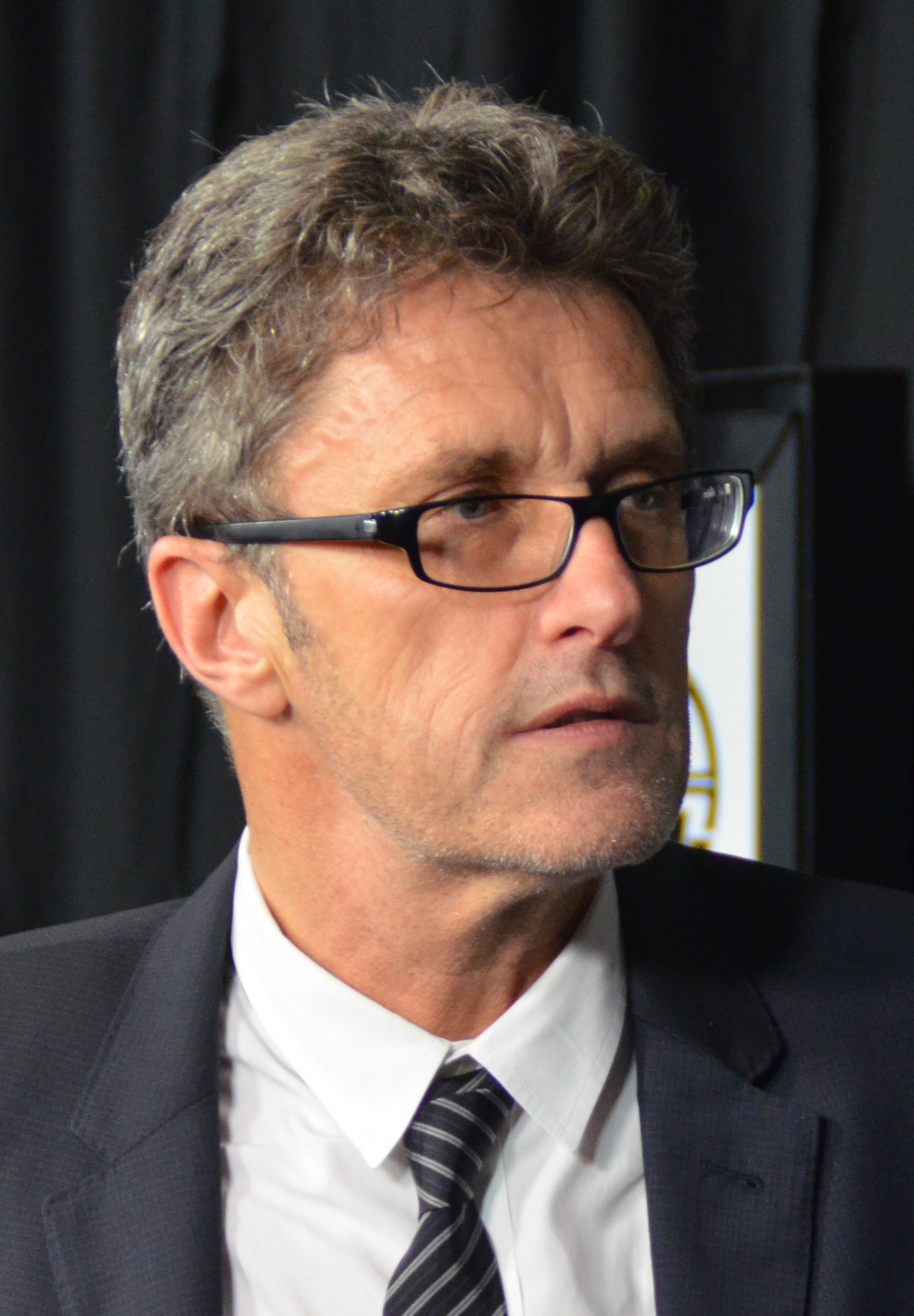
Paweł Pawlikowski directed the winner Ida (2014).

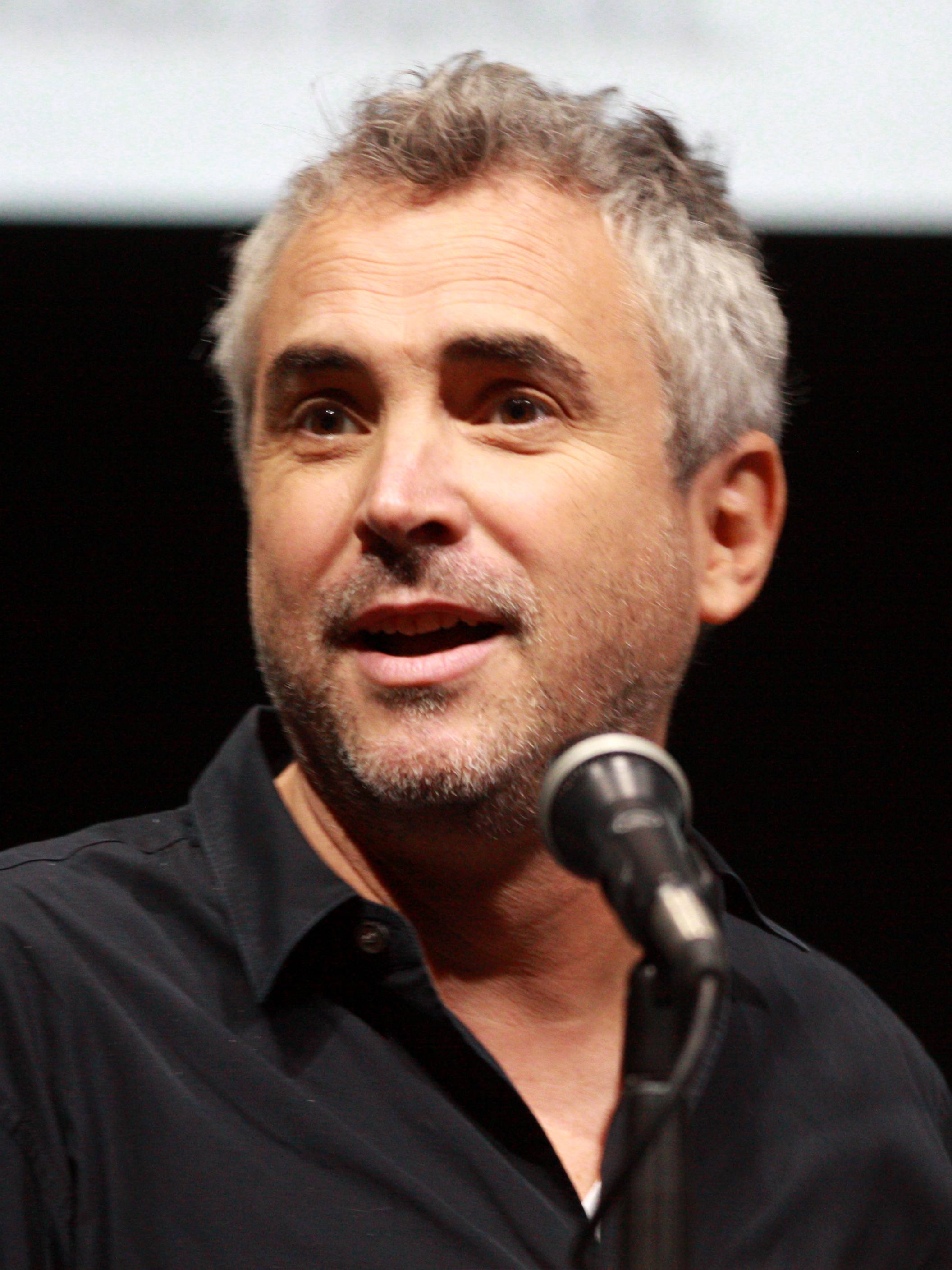
Alfonso Cuarón directed the winner Roma (2018).

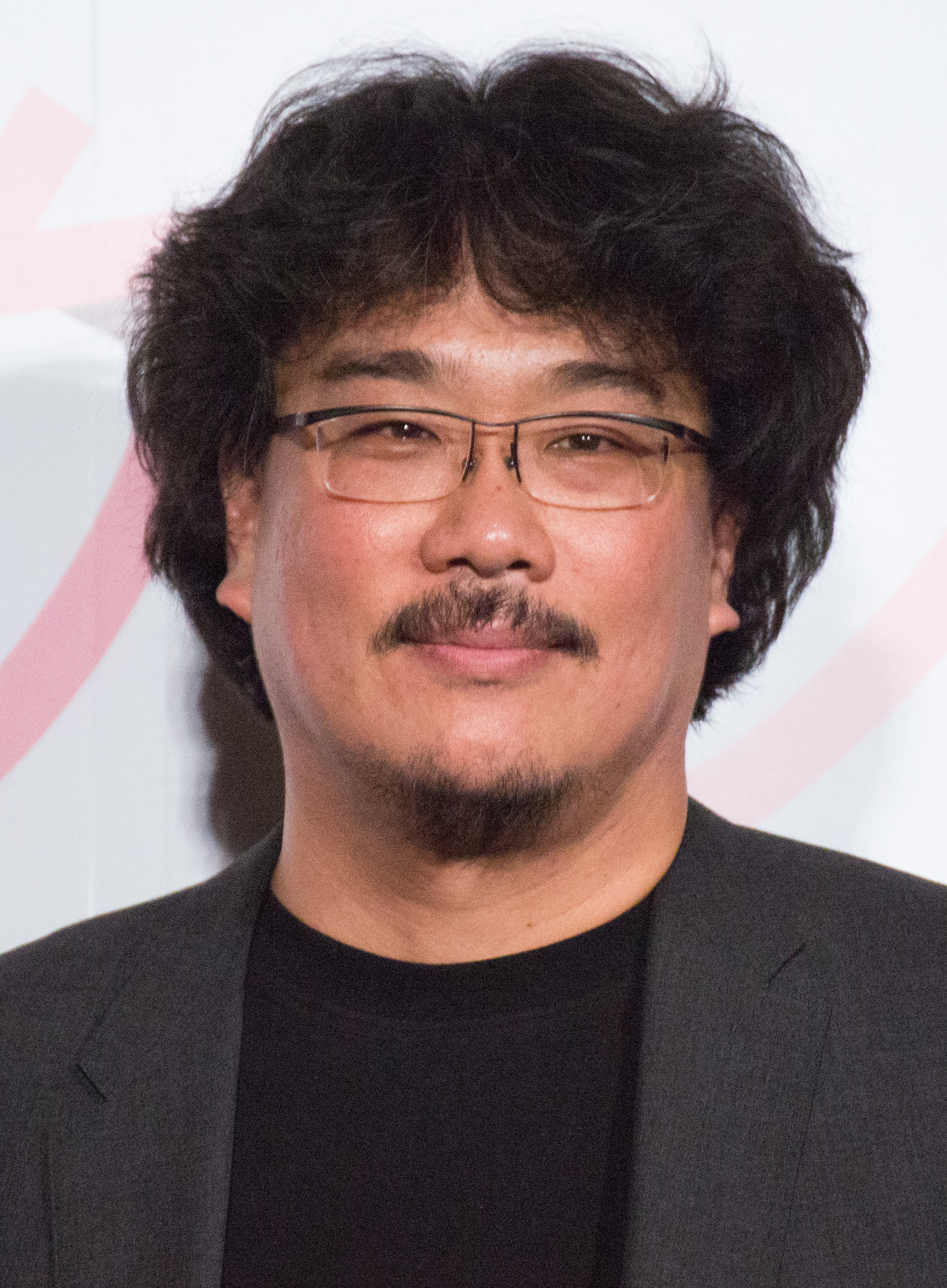
Bong Joon Ho directed the winner Parasite (2019).

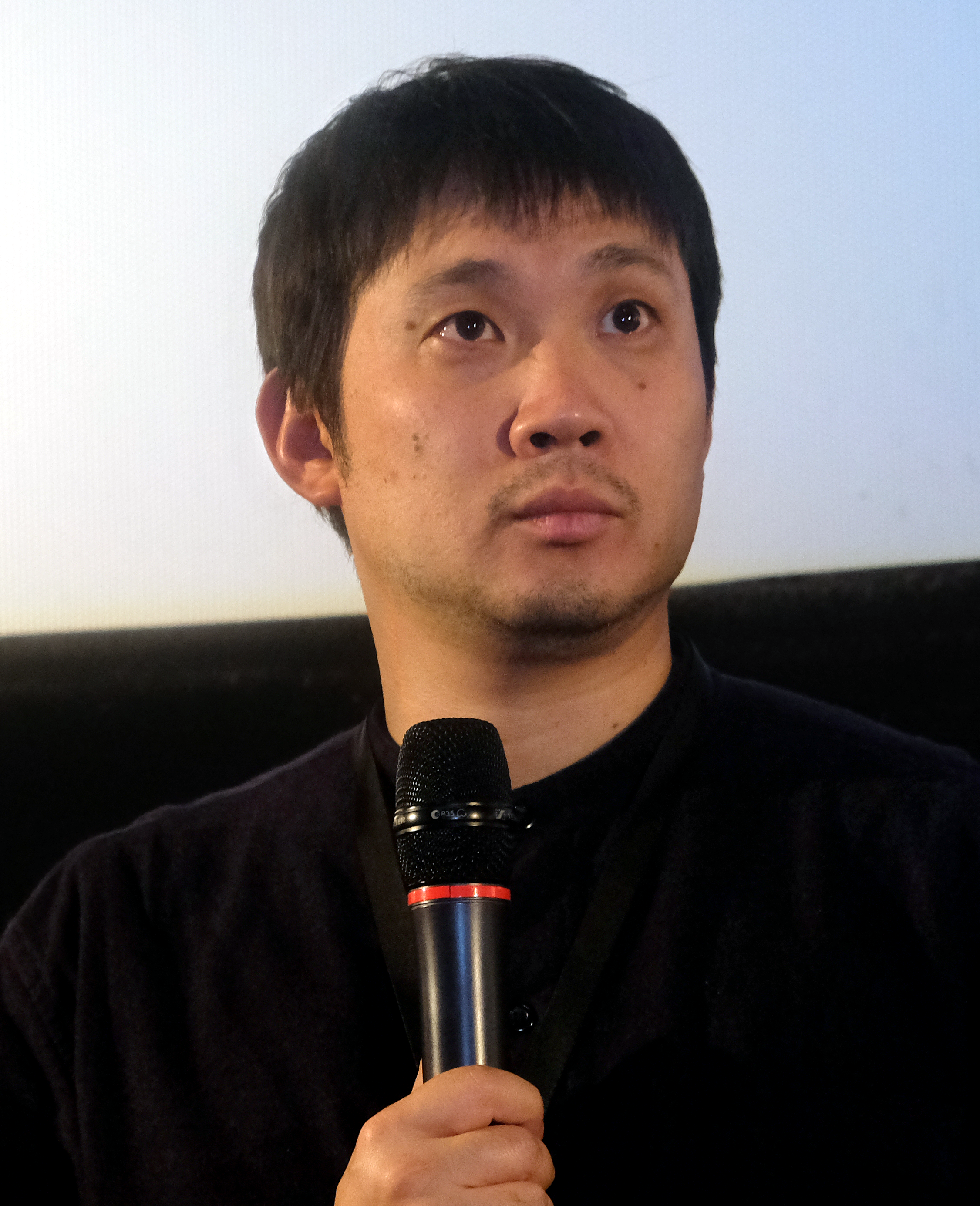
Ryusuke Hamaguchi directed the winner Drive My Car (2021).

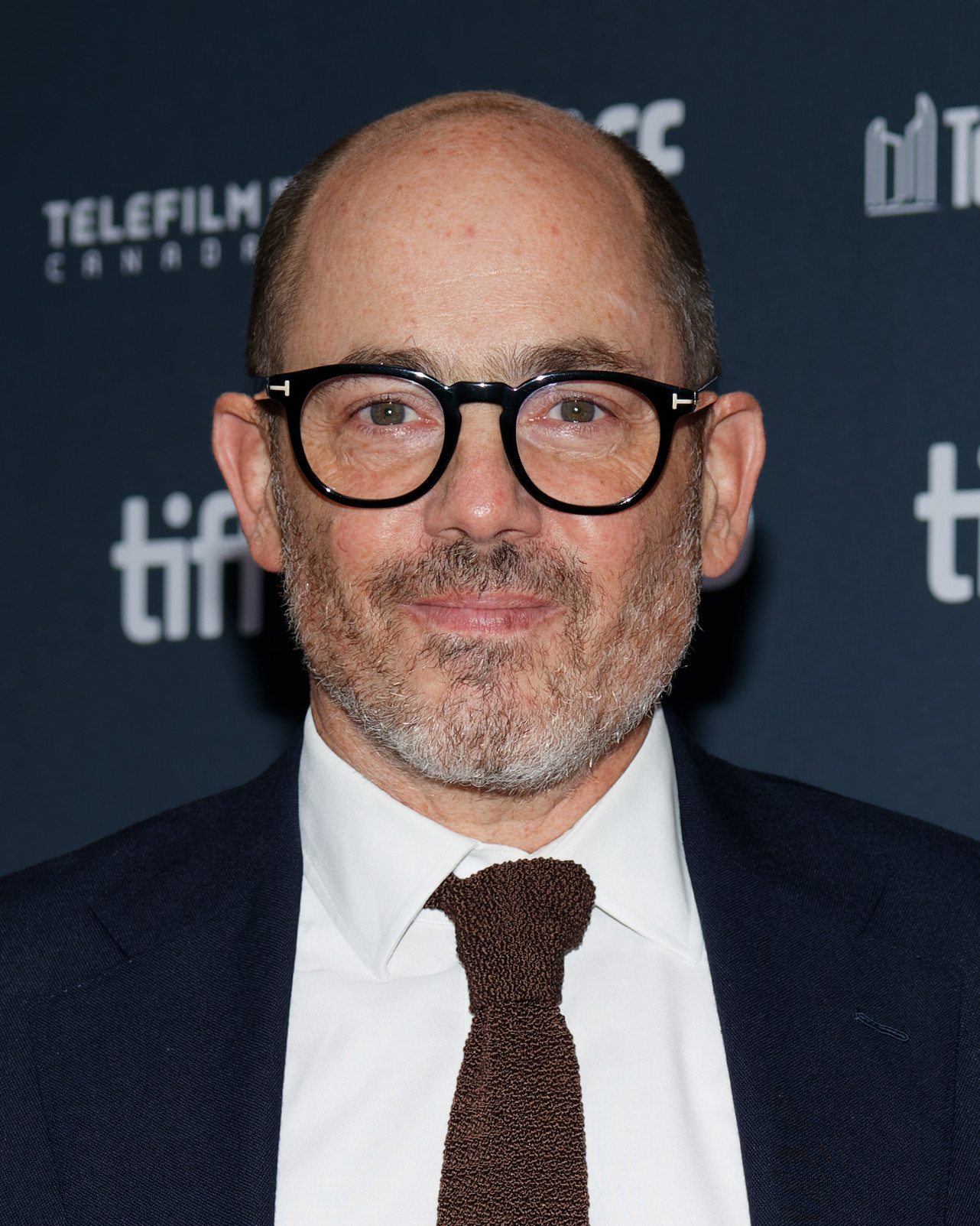
Edward Berger directed the winner All Quiet on the Western Front (2022).

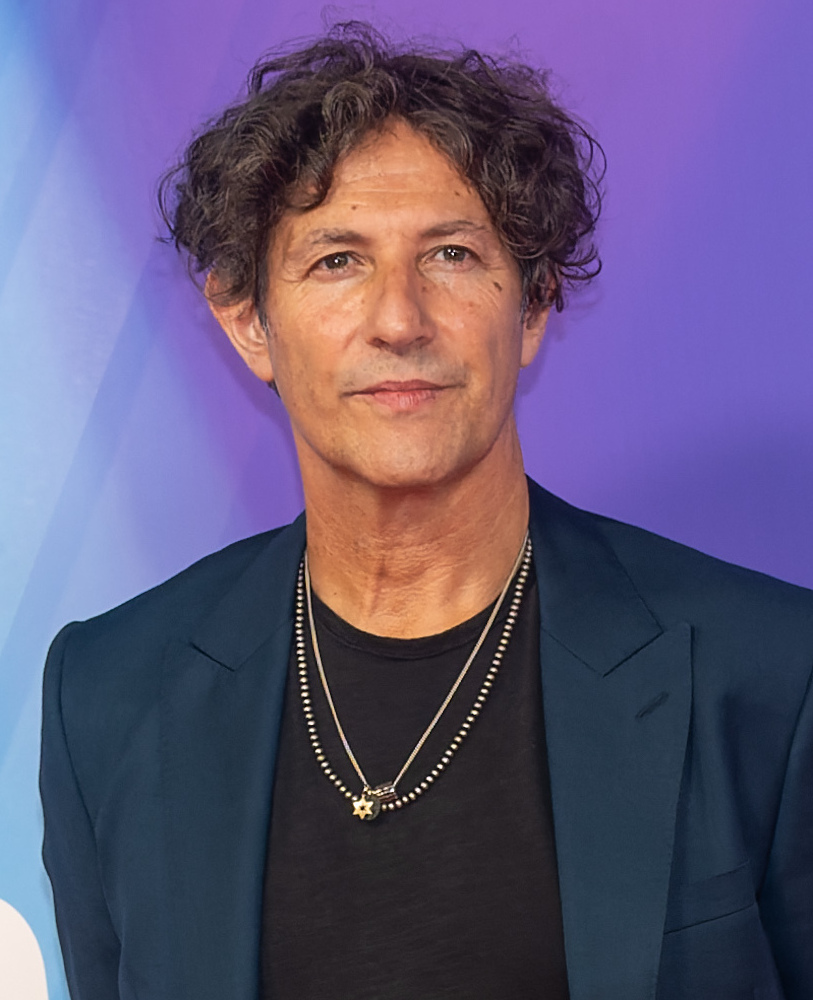
Jonathan Glazer directed the winner The Zone of Interest (2023).

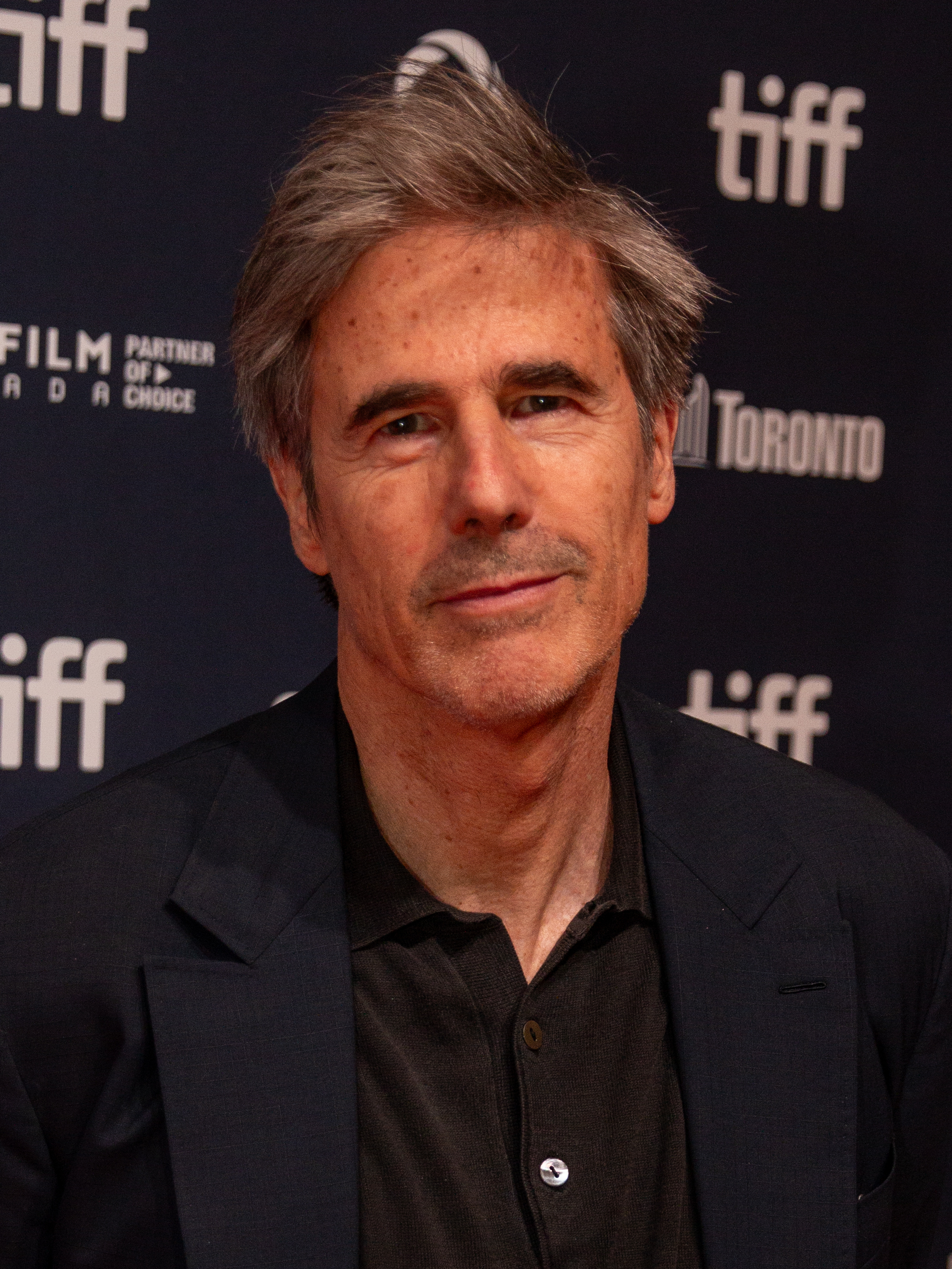
Walter Salles directed the winner I'm Still Here (2024).

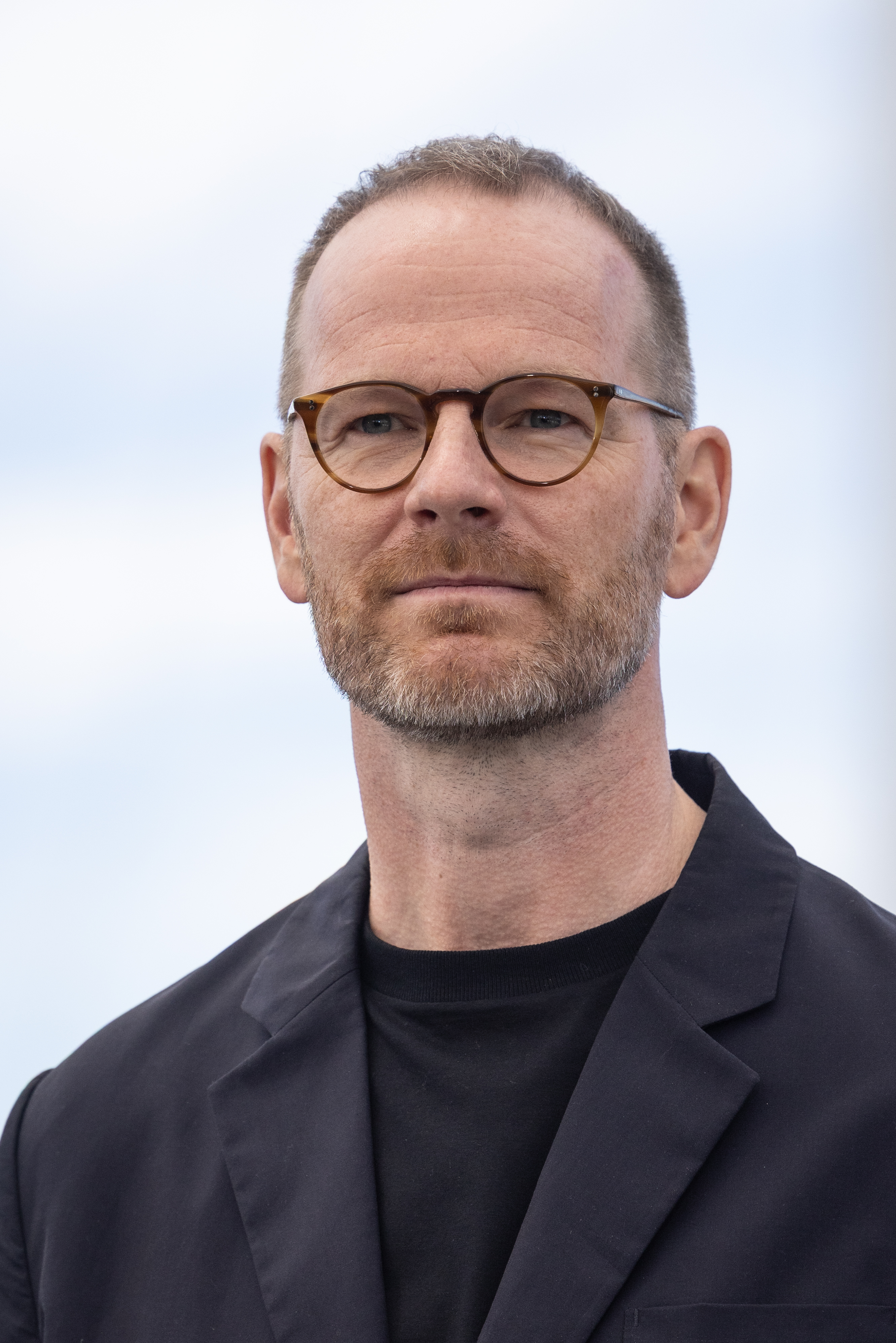
Joachim Trier directed the winner Sentimental Value (2025).

Table key
‡	Special/Honorary Award (1947–1955)

=== 1940s ===
Year	Film Title used in nomination	Original Title	Director(s)	Submitting Countries	Language(s)
1947 (20th)	**Shoe-Shine ‡** ^{[C]}	**Sciuscià**	**Vittorio De Sica**	**Italy**	**Italian, English**
1948 (21st)	**Monsieur Vincent ‡** ^{[D]}		**Maurice Cloche**	**France**	**French**
1949 (22nd)	**Bicycle Thieves ‡** ^{[E]}	**Ladri di biciclette**	**Vittorio De Sica**	**Italy**	**Italian**

=== 1950s ===
Year	Film Title used in nomination	Original Title	Director(s)	Submitting Countries	Language(s)
1950 (23rd)	**The Walls of Malapaga ‡** ^{[F]}	French; **Au-delà des grilles** Italian; **Le mura di Malapaga**	**René Clément**	{co-production} **France**; **Italy**	**French, Italian**
1951 (24th)	**Rashomon ‡** ^{[G]}	**羅生門**	**Akira Kurosawa**	**Japan**	**Japanese**
1952 (25th)	**Forbidden Games‡** ^{[H]}	**Jeux interdits**	**René Clément**	**France**	**French**
1954 (27th)	**Gate of Hell ‡** ^{[I]}	**地獄門**	**Teinosuke Kinugasa**	**Japan**	**Japanese**
1955 (28th)	**Samurai, The Legend of Musashi ‡** ^{[J]}	**宮本武蔵**	**Hiroshi Inagaki**	**Japan**	**Japanese**
1956 (29th)	**La Strada** ^{[K]}		**Federico Fellini**	**Italy**	**Italian**
1956 (29th)	The Captain of Köpenick ^{[K]}	Der Hauptmann von Köpenick	Helmut Käutner	West Germany	German
1956 (29th)	Gervaise ^{[K]}		René Clément	France	French
1956 (29th)	Harp of Burma ^{[K]}	ビルマの竪琴	Kon Ichikawa	Japan	Japanese
1956 (29th)	Qivitoq ^{[K]}		Erik Balling	Denmark	Danish
1957 (30th)	**Nights of Cabiria**	**Le notti di Cabiria**	**Federico Fellini**	**Italy**	**Italian**
1957 (30th)	The Devil Strikes at Night	Nachts, wenn der Teufel kam	Robert Siodmak	West Germany	German
1957 (30th)	Gates of Paris	Porte des Lilas	René Clair	France	French
1957 (30th)	Mother India	मदर इंडिया	Mehboob Khan	India	Hindi
1957 (30th)	Nine Lives	Ni liv	Arne Skouen	Norway	Norwegian
1958 (31st)	**Mon Oncle**		**Jacques Tati**	**France**	**French**
1958 (31st)	Arms and the Man	Helden	Franz Peter Wirth	West Germany	German
1958 (31st)	La Venganza		Juan Antonio Bardem	(Francoist Spain) Spain	Spanish
1958 (31st)	The Road a Year Long	La strada lunga un anno / Cesta duga godinu dana / Цеста дуга годину дана	Giuseppe De Santis	(Socialist Federal Republic of Yugoslavia) Yugoslavia	Italian
1958 (31st)	The Usual Unidentified Thieves	I soliti ignoti	Mario Monicelli	Italy	Italian
1959 (32nd)	**Black Orpheus**	**Orfeu Negro**	**Marcel Camus**	**France**	**Brazilian Portuguese**
1959 (32nd)	The Bridge	Die Brücke	Bernhard Wicki	West Germany	German
1959 (32nd)	The Great War	La grande guerra	Mario Monicelli	Italy	Italian
1959 (32nd)	Paw		Astrid Henning-Jensen	Denmark	Danish
1959 (32nd)	The Village on the River	Dorp aan de rivier	Fons Rademakers	Netherlands	Dutch

=== 1960s ===
Year	Film Title used in nomination	Original Title	Director(s)	Submitting Countries	Language(s)
1960 (33rd)	**The Virgin Spring**	**Jungfrukällan**	**Ingmar Bergman**	**Sweden**	**Swedish**
1960 (33rd)	Kapo		Gillo Pontecorvo	Italy	Italian
1960 (33rd)	La Vérité		Henri-Georges Clouzot	France	French
1960 (33rd)	Macario		Roberto Gavaldón	Mexico	Spanish
1960 (33rd)	The Ninth Circle	Deveti krug / Девети круг	France Štiglic	(Socialist Federal Republic of Yugoslavia) Yugoslavia	Serbo-Croatian
1961 (34th)	**Through a Glass Darkly**	**Såsom i en spegel**	**Ingmar Bergman**	**Sweden**	**Swedish**
1961 (34th)	Harry and the Butler	Harry og kammertjeneren	Bent Christensen	Denmark	Danish
1961 (34th)	Immortal Love	永遠の人	Keisuke Kinoshita	Japan	Japanese
1961 (34th)	The Important Man	Animas Trujano / El hombre importante	Ismael Rodríguez	Mexico	Spanish
1961 (34th)	Plácido		Luis García Berlanga	(Francoist Spain) Spain	Spanish
1962 (35th)	**Sundays and Cybele**	**Les Dimanches de Ville d'Avray**	**Serge Bourguignon**	**France**	**French**
1962 (35th)	Electra	Ηλέκτρα	Michael Cacoyannis	Greece	Greek
1962 (35th)	The Four Days of Naples	Le quattro giornate di Napoli	Nanni Loy	Italy	Italian
1962 (35th)	Keeper of Promises (The Given Word)	O Pagador de Promessas	Anselmo Duarte	Brazil	Brazilian Portuguese
1962 (35th)	Tlayucan		Luis Alcoriza	Mexico	Spanish
1963 (36th)	**8½**		**Federico Fellini**	**Italy**	**Italian**
1963 (36th)	Knife in the Water	Nóż w wodzie	Roman Polanski	Poland	Polish
1963 (36th)	Los Tarantos		Francisco Rovira Beleta	(Francoist Spain) Spain	Spanish
1963 (36th)	The Red Lanterns	Τα κόκκινα φανάρια	Vasilis Georgiadis	Greece	Greek
1963 (36th)	Twin Sisters of Kyoto	古都	Noboru Nakamura	Japan	Japanese
1964 (37th)	**Yesterday, Today and Tomorrow**	**Ieri, oggi, domani**	**Vittorio De Sica**	**Italy**	**Italian**
1964 (37th)	Raven's End	Kvarteret Korpen	Bo Widerberg	Sweden	Swedish
1964 (37th)	Sallah Shabati	סאלח שבתי	Ephraim Kishon	Israel	Hebrew
1964 (37th)	The Umbrellas of Cherbourg	Les Parapluies de Cherbourg	Jacques Demy	France	French
1964 (37th)	Woman in the Dunes	砂の女	Hiroshi Teshigahara	Japan	Japanese
1965 (38th)	**The Shop on Main Street**	**Obchod na korze**	**Ján Kadár and Elmar Klos**	**Czechoslovakia**	**Slovak**
1965 (38th)	Blood on the Land	Το χώμα βάφτηκε κόκκινο	Vasilis Georgiadis	Greece	Greek
1965 (38th)	Dear John	Käre John	Lars-Magnus Lindgren	Sweden	Swedish
1965 (38th)	Kwaidan	怪談	Masaki Kobayashi	Japan	Japanese
1965 (38th)	Marriage Italian Style	Matrimonio all'italiana	Vittorio De Sica	Italy	Italian
1966 (39th)	**A Man and a Woman**	**Un homme et une femme**	**Claude Lelouch**	**France**	**French**
1966 (39th)	The Battle of Algiers	La battaglia di Algeri	Gillo Pontecorvo	Italy	Arabic, French
1966 (39th)	Loves of a Blonde	Lásky jedné plavovlásky	Miloš Forman	Czechoslovakia	Czech
1966 (39th)	Pharaoh	Faraon	Jerzy Kawalerowicz	Poland	Polish
1966 (39th)	Three	Tri / Три	Aleksandar Petrović	(Socialist Federal Republic of Yugoslavia) Yugoslavia	Serbo-Croatian
1967 (40th)	**Closely Watched Trains**	**Ostře sledované vlaky**	**Jiří Menzel**	**Czechoslovakia**	**Czech, German**
1967 (40th)	Bewitched Love	El amor brujo	Francisco Rovira Beleta	(Francoist Spain) Spain	Spanish
1967 (40th)	I Even Met Happy Gypsies	Skupljači perja / Скупљачи перја	Aleksandar Petrović	(Socialist Federal Republic of Yugoslavia) Yugoslavia	Serbo-Croatian
1967 (40th)	Live for Life	Vivre pour vivre	Claude Lelouch	France	French
1967 (40th)	Portrait of Chieko	智恵子抄	Noboru Nakamura	Japan	Japanese
1968 (41st)	**War and Peace**	**Война и мир**	**Sergei Bondarchuk**	**Soviet Union**	**Russian, French, German**
1968 (41st)	The Boys of Paul Street	A Pál-utcai fiúk	Zoltán Fábri	Hungary	Hungarian
1968 (41st)	The Firemen's Ball	Hoří, má panenko	Miloš Forman	Czechoslovakia	Czech
1968 (41st)	The Girl with the Pistol	La ragazza con la pistola	Mario Monicelli	Italy	Italian
1968 (41st)	Stolen Kisses	Baisers volés	François Truffaut	France	French
1969 (42nd)	**Z**		**Costa-Gavras**	**Algeria**	**French, Russian, English**
1969 (42nd)	Ådalen 31		Bo Widerberg	Sweden	Swedish
1969 (42nd)	Battle of Neretva	Bitka na Neretvi / Битка на Неретви	Veljko Bulajić	(Socialist Federal Republic of Yugoslavia) Yugoslavia	Serbo-Croatian, Italian, German, English
1969 (42nd)	The Brothers Karamazov	Братья Карамазовы	Kirill Lavrov, Ivan Pyryev and Mikhail Ulyanov	Soviet Union	Russian
1969 (42nd)	My Night with Maud ^{[L]}	Ma nuit chez Maud	Éric Rohmer	France	French

=== 1970s ===
Year	Film Title used in nomination	Original Title	Director(s)	Submitting Countries	Language(s)
1970 (43rd)	**Investigation of a Citizen Above Suspicion**	**Indagine su un cittadino al di sopra di ogni sospetto**	**Elio Petri**	**Italy**	**Italian**
1970 (43rd)	First Love	Erste Liebe	Maximilian Schell	Switzerland	German
1970 (43rd)	Hoa-Binh		Raoul Coutard	France	French
1970 (43rd)	Peace in the Fields	Paix sur les champs	Jacques Boigelot	Belgium	French
1970 (43rd)	Tristana		Luis Buñuel	(Francoist Spain) Spain	Spanish
1971 (44th)	**The Garden of the Finzi Continis**	**Il giardino dei Finzi-Contini**	**Vittorio De Sica**	**Italy**	**Italian**
1971 (44th)	Dodes'ka-den	どですかでん	Akira Kurosawa	Japan	Japanese
1971 (44th)	The Emigrants	Utvandrarna	Jan Troell	Sweden	Swedish
1971 (44th)	The Policeman	השוטר אזולאי	Ephraim Kishon	Israel	Hebrew
1971 (44th)	Tchaikovsky	Чайковский	Igor Talankin	Soviet Union	Russian
1972 (45th)	**The Discreet Charm of the Bourgeoisie**	**Le Charme discret de la bourgeoisie**	**Luis Buñuel**	**France**	**French**
1972 (45th)	The Dawns Here Are Quiet	А зори здесь тихие	Stanislav Rostotsky	Soviet Union	Russian
1972 (45th)	I Love You Rosa	אני אוהב אותך רוזה	Moshé Mizrahi	Israel	Hebrew
1972 (45th)	My Dearest Señorita	Mi querida señorita	Jaime de Armiñán	Spain	Spanish
1972 (45th)	The New Land	Nybyggarna	Jan Troell	Sweden	Swedish
1973 (46th)	**Day for Night**	**La Nuit américaine**	**François Truffaut**	**France**	**French**
1973 (46th)	The House on Chelouche Street	הבית ברחוב שלוש	Moshé Mizrahi	Israel	Hebrew
1973 (46th)	L'Invitation		Claude Goretta	Switzerland	French
1973 (46th)	The Pedestrian	Der Fußgänger	Maximilian Schell	West Germany	German
1973 (46th)	Turkish Delight	Turks Fruit	Paul Verhoeven	Netherlands	Dutch
1974 (47th)	**Amarcord**		**Federico Fellini**	**Italy**	**Italian**
1974 (47th)	Cats' Play	Macskajáték	Károly Makk	Hungary	Hungarian
1974 (47th)	The Deluge	Potop	Jerzy Hoffman	Poland	Polish
1974 (47th)	Lacombe, Lucien	Lacombe Lucien	Louis Malle	France	French
1974 (47th)	The Truce	La tregua	Sergio Renán	Argentina	Spanish
1975 (48th)	**Dersu Uzala**	**Дерсу Узала**	**Akira Kurosawa**	**Soviet Union**	**Russian**
1975 (48th)	Letters from Marusia	Actas de Marusia	Miguel Littín	Mexico	Spanish
1975 (48th)	The Promised Land	Ziemia obiecana	Andrzej Wajda	Poland	Polish
1975 (48th)	Sandakan No. 8	サンダカン八番娼館 望郷	Kei Kumai	Japan	Japanese
1975 (48th)	Scent of a Woman	Profumo di donna	Dino Risi	Italy	Italian
1976 (49th)	**Black and White in Color**	**La Victoire en chantant** ^{[M]}	**Jean-Jacques Annaud**	**Ivory Coast**	**French**
1976 (49th)	Cousin Cousine		Jean-Charles Tacchella	France	French
1976 (49th)	Jacob the Liar	Jakob der Lügner	Frank Beyer	East Germany	German
1976 (49th)	Nights and Days	Noce i dnie	Jerzy Antczak	Poland	Polish
1976 (49th)	Seven Beauties	Pasqualino Settebellezze	Lina Wertmüller	Italy	Italian
1977 (50th)	**Madame Rosa**	**La Vie devant soi**	**Moshé Mizrahi**	**France**	**French**
1977 (50th)	Iphigenia	Ιφιγένεια	Michael Cacoyannis	Greece	Greek
1977 (50th)	Operation Thunderbolt	מבצע יונתן	Menahem Golan	Israel	Hebrew, English, Arabic, German, French, Spanish
1977 (50th)	A Special Day	Una giornata particolare	Ettore Scola	Italy	Italian
1977 (50th)	That Obscure Object of Desire	Cet obscur objet du désir / Ese oscuro objeto del deseo	Luis Buñuel	Spain	French, Spanish
1978 (51st)	**Get Out Your Handkerchiefs**	**Préparez vos mouchoirs**	**Bertrand Blier**	**France**	**French**
1978 (51st)	The Glass Cell	Die gläserne Zelle	Hans W. Geißendörfer	West Germany	German
1978 (51st)	Hungarians	Magyarok	Zoltán Fábri	Hungary	Hungarian, German, Polish
1978 (51st)	Viva Italia!	I nuovi mostri	Mario Monicelli, Dino Risi, Ettore Scola	Italy	Italian
1978 (51st)	White Bim Black Ear	Белый Бим Чёрное ухо	Stanislav Rostotsky	Soviet Union	Russian
1979 (52nd)	**The Tin Drum**	**Die Blechtrommel**	**Volker Schlöndorff**	**West Germany**	**German**
1979 (52nd)	The Maids of Wilko	Panny z Wilka	Andrzej Wajda	Poland	Polish
1979 (52nd)	Mama Turns 100	Mamá cumple cien años	Carlos Saura	Spain	Spanish
1979 (52nd)	A Simple Story	Une histoire simple	Claude Sautet	France	French
1979 (52nd)	To Forget Venice	Dimenticare Venezia	Franco Brusati	Italy	Italian

=== 1980s ===
Year	Film Title used in nomination	Original Title	Director(s)	Submitting Countries	Language(s)
1980 (53rd)	**Moscow Does Not Believe in Tears**	**Москва слезам не верит**	**Vladimir Menshov**	**Soviet Union**	**Russian**
1980 (53rd)	Confidence	Bizalom	István Szabó	Hungary	Hungarian, German
1980 (53rd)	Kagemusha (The Shadow Warrior)	影武者	Akira Kurosawa	Japan	Japanese
1980 (53rd)	The Last Metro	Le Dernier Métro	François Truffaut	France	French
1980 (53rd)	The Nest	El nido	Jaime de Armiñán	Spain	Spanish
1981 (54th)	**Mephisto**		**István Szabó**	**Hungary**	**German**
1981 (54th)	The Boat Is Full	Das Boot ist voll	Markus Imhoof	Switzerland	German
1981 (54th)	Man of Iron	Człowiek z żelaza	Andrzej Wajda	Poland	Polish
1981 (54th)	Muddy River	泥の河	Kōhei Oguri	Japan	Japanese
1981 (54th)	Three Brothers	Tre fratelli	Francesco Rosi	Italy	Italian
1982 (55th)	**To Begin Again**	**Volver a empezar**	**José Luis Garci**	**Spain**	**Spanish**
1982 (55th)	Alsino and the Condor	Alsino y el cóndor	Miguel Littín	Nicaragua	Spanish, English
1982 (55th)	Coup de Torchon ('Clean Slate')	Coup de torchon	Bertrand Tavernier	France	French
1982 (55th)	Flight of the Eagle	Ingenjör Andrées luftfärd	Jan Troell	Sweden	Swedish
1982 (55th)	Private Life	Частная жизнь	Yuli Raizman	Soviet Union	Russian
1983 (56th)	**Fanny and Alexander**	**Fanny och Alexander**	**Ingmar Bergman**	**Sweden**	**Swedish**
1983 (56th)	Carmen		Carlos Saura	Spain	Spanish
1983 (56th)	Entre Nous	Coup de foudre	Diane Kurys	France	French
1983 (56th)	Job's Revolt	Jób lázadása	Imre Gyöngyössy, Barna Kabay	Hungary	Hungarian
1983 (56th)	Le Bal		Ettore Scola	Algeria	No dialogue
1984 (57th)	**Dangerous Moves**	**La Diagonale du fou**	**Richard Dembo**	**Switzerland**	**French**
1984 (57th)	Beyond the Walls	מאחורי הסורגים	Uri Barbash	Israel	Hebrew
1984 (57th)	Camila		María Luisa Bemberg	Argentina	Spanish
1984 (57th)	Double Feature	Sesión continua	José Luis Garci	Spain	Spanish
1984 (57th)	Wartime Romance	Военно-полевой роман	Pyotr Todorovsky	Soviet Union	Russian
1985 (58th)	**The Official Story**	**La historia oficial**	**Luis Puenzo**	**Argentina**	**Spanish**
1985 (58th)	Angry Harvest	Bittere Ernte	Agnieszka Holland	West Germany	German
1985 (58th)	Colonel Redl	Oberst Redl	István Szabó	Hungary	Hungarian
1985 (58th)	Three Men and a Cradle	Trois Hommes et un couffin	Coline Serreau	France	French
1985 (58th)	When Father Was Away on Business	Otac na službenom putu / Отац на службеном путу	Emir Kusturica	(Socialist Federal Republic of Yugoslavia) Yugoslavia	Serbo-Croatian
1986 (59th)	**The Assault**	**De aanslag**	**Fons Rademakers**	**Netherlands**	**Dutch, English, German**
1986 (59th)	'38 – Vienna Before the Fall	38 – Auch das war Wien	Wolfgang Glück	Austria	German
1986 (59th)	Betty Blue	37°2 le matin	Jean-Jacques Beineix	France	French
1986 (59th)	The Decline of the American Empire	Le Déclin de l'empire américain	Denys Arcand	Canada	French
1986 (59th)	My Sweet Little Village	Vesničko má středisková	Jiří Menzel	Czechoslovakia	Czech
1987 (60th)	**Babette's Feast**	**Babettes gæstebud**	**Gabriel Axel**	**Denmark**	**Danish, Swedish, French**
1987 (60th)	Au Revoir Les Enfants (Goodbye, Children)	Au Revoir les Enfants	Louis Malle	France	French
1987 (60th)	Course Completed	Asignatura Aprobada	José Luis Garci	Spain	Spanish
1987 (60th)	The Family	La famiglia	Ettore Scola	Italy	Italian
1987 (60th)	Pathfinder	Ofelaš / Veiviseren	Nils Gaup	Norway	Northern Sami
1988 (61st)	**Pelle the Conqueror**	**Pelle Erobreren**	**Bille August**	**Denmark**	**Scanian, Danish, Swedish**
1988 (61st)	Hanussen		István Szabó	Hungary	Hungarian
1988 (61st)	The Music Teacher	Le Maître de Musique	Gérard Corbiau	Belgium	French
1988 (61st)	Salaam Bombay!	सलाम बॉम्बे!	Mira Nair	India	Hindi
1988 (61st)	Women on the Verge of a Nervous Breakdown	Mujeres al Borde de un Ataque de Nervios	Pedro Almodóvar	Spain	Spanish
1989 (62nd)	**Cinema Paradiso**	**Nuovo cinema Paradiso**	**Giuseppe Tornatore**	**Italy**	**Italian**
1989 (62nd)	Camille Claudel		Bruno Nuytten	France	French
1989 (62nd)	Jesus of Montreal	Jésus de Montréal	Denys Arcand	Canada	French
1989 (62nd)	Waltzing Regitze	Dansen med Regitze	Kaspar Rostrup	Denmark	Danish
1989 (62nd)	What Happened to Santiago	Lo que le pasó a Santiago	Jacobo Morales	Puerto Rico ^{[N]}	Spanish

=== 1990s ===
Year	Film Title used in nomination	Original Title	Director(s)	Submitting Countries	Language(s)
1990 (63rd)	**Journey of Hope**	**Reise der Hoffnung**	**Xavier Koller**	**Switzerland**	**German, Turkish**
1990 (63rd)	Cyrano de Bergerac		Jean-Paul Rappeneau	France	French
1990 (63rd)	Ju Dou	菊豆	Zhang Yimou, Yang Fengliang	China	Mandarin
1990 (63rd)	The Nasty Girl	Das schreckliche Mädchen	Michael Verhoeven	West Germany	German
1990 (63rd)	Open Doors	Porte aperte	Gianni Amelio	Italy	Italian
1991 (64th)	**Mediterraneo**		**Gabriele Salvatores**	**Italy**	**Italian**
1991 (64th)	Children of Nature	Börn náttúrunnar	Friðrik Þór Friðriksson	Iceland	Icelandic, English
1991 (64th)	The Elementary School	Obecná škola	Jan Svěrák	Czechoslovakia	Czech
1991 (64th)	The Ox	Oxen	Sven Nykvist	Sweden	Swedish
1991 (64th)	Raise the Red Lantern	大紅燈籠高高掛	Zhang Yimou	(British Hong Kong) Hong Kong	Mandarin
1992 (65th)	**Indochine**		**Régis Wargnier**	**France**	**French, Vietnamese**
1992 (65th)	Close to Eden	У́рга — территория любви	Nikita Mikhalkov	Russia	Russian
1992 (65th)	Daens		Stijn Coninx	Belgium	Dutch, French, Latin
1992 (65th)	~~A Place in the World~~	~~Un lugar en el mundo~~	~~Adolfo Aristarain~~	~~Uruguay~~^{[O]}	~~Spanish~~
1992 (65th)	Schtonk!		Helmut Dietl	Germany	German
1993 (66th)	**Belle Époque**		**Fernando Trueba**	**Spain**	**Spanish**
1993 (66th)	Farewell My Concubine	霸王別姬	Chen Kaige	(British Hong Kong) Hong Kong	Mandarin
1993 (66th)	Hedd Wyn		Paul Turner	United Kingdom	Welsh, English
1993 (66th)	The Scent of Green Papaya	Mùi đu đủ xanh	Trần Anh Hùng	Vietnam	Vietnamese
1993 (66th)	The Wedding Banquet	囍宴	Ang Lee	Taiwan	Mandarin, English
1994 (67th)	**Burnt by the Sun**	**Утомлённые солнцем**	**Nikita Mikhalkov**	**Russia**	**Russian**
1994 (67th)	Before the Rain	Пред дождот	Milcho Manchevski	(North Macedonia) Macedonia	Macedonian, English, Albanian
1994 (67th)	Eat Drink Man Woman	飲食男女	Ang Lee	Taiwan	Mandarin
1994 (67th)	Farinelli: Il Castrato	Farinelli	Gérard Corbiau	Belgium	Italian, French
1994 (67th)	Strawberry and Chocolate	Fresa y chocolate	Tomás Gutiérrez Alea, Juan Carlos Tabío	Cuba	Spanish
1995 (68th)	**Antonia's Line**	**Antonia**	**Marleen Gorris**	**Netherlands**	**Dutch**
1995 (68th)	All Things Fair	Lust och fägring stor	Bo Widerberg	Sweden	Swedish
1995 (68th)	Dust of Life	Poussières de vie	Rachid Bouchareb	Algeria	French
1995 (68th)	O Quatrilho		Fábio Barreto	Brazil	Brazilian Portuguese, Italian
1995 (68th)	The Star Maker	L'uomo delle stelle	Giuseppe Tornatore	Italy	Italian
1996 (69th)	**Kolya**	**Kolja**	**Jan Svěrák**	**Czech Republic**	**Czech**
1996 (69th)	A Chef in Love	შეყვარებული კულინარის 1001 რეცეპტი	Nana Jorjadze	(Georgia (country)) Georgia	French, Georgian
1996 (69th)	The Other Side of Sunday	Søndagsengler	Berit Nesheim	Norway	Norwegian
1996 (69th)	Prisoner of the Mountains	Кавказский пленник	Sergei Bodrov	Russia	Russian
1996 (69th)	Ridicule		Patrice Leconte	France	French
1997 (70th)	**Character**	**Karakter**	**Mike van Diem**	**Netherlands**	**Dutch**
1997 (70th)	Beyond Silence	Jenseits der Stille	Caroline Link	Germany	German
1997 (70th)	Four Days in September	O Que é Isso, Companheiro?	Bruno Barreto	Brazil	Brazilian Portuguese
1997 (70th)	Secrets of the Heart	Secretos del corazón	Montxo Armendáriz	Spain	Spanish
1997 (70th)	The Thief	Вор	Pavel Chukhray	Russia	Russian
1998 (71st)	**Life Is Beautiful**	**La vita è bella**	**Roberto Benigni**	**Italy**	**Italian, German**
1998 (71st)	Central Station	Central do Brasil	Walter Salles	Brazil	Brazilian Portuguese
1998 (71st)	Children of Heaven	بچه های آسمان	Majid Majidi	Iran	Persian
1998 (71st)	The Grandfather	El abuelo	José Luis Garci	Spain	Spanish
1998 (71st)	Tango	Tango, no me dejes nunca	Carlos Saura	Argentina	Spanish
1999 (72nd)	**All About My Mother**	**Todo sobre mi madre**	**Pedro Almodóvar**	**Spain**	**Spanish**
1999 (72nd)	East-West	Est-Ouest	Régis Wargnier	France	French, Russian
1999 (72nd)	Caravan	Himalaya, l'enfance d'un chef	Éric Valli	Nepal	Dolpo
1999 (72nd)	Solomon & Gaenor	Solomon a Gaenor	Paul Morrison	United Kingdom	Welsh, Yiddish
1999 (72nd)	Under the Sun	Under solen	Colin Nutley	Sweden	Swedish

=== 2000s ===
Year	Film Title used in nomination	Original Title	Director(s)	Submitting Countries	Language(s)
2000 (73rd)	**Crouching Tiger, Hidden Dragon**	**臥虎藏龍**	**Ang Lee**	**Taiwan**	**Mandarin**
2000 (73rd)	Amores perros		Alejandro González Iñárritu	Mexico	Spanish
2000 (73rd)	Divided We Fall	Musíme si pomáhat	Jan Hřebejk	Czech Republic	Czech
2000 (73rd)	Everybody's Famous!	Iedereen beroemd!	Dominique Deruddere	Belgium	Dutch
2000 (73rd)	The Taste of Others	Le goût des autres	Agnès Jaoui	France	French
2001 (74th)	**No Man's Land**	**Ničija zemlja**	**Danis Tanović**	(Bosnia and Herzegovina) **Bosnia & Herzegovina**	**Bosnian, French, English, Serbian**
2001 (74th)	Amélie	Le fabuleux destin d'Amélie Poulain	Jean-Pierre Jeunet	France	French
2001 (74th)	Elling		Petter Næss	Norway	Norwegian
2001 (74th)	Lagaan	लगान	Ashutosh Gowariker	India	Hindi, English
2001 (74th)	Son of the Bride	El hijo de la novia	Juan José Campanella	Argentina	Spanish
2002 (75th)	**Nowhere in Africa**	**Nirgendwo in Afrika**	**Caroline Link**	**Germany**	**German, English, Swahili**
2002 (75th)	The Crime of Father Amaro	El crimen del padre Amaro	Carlos Carrera	Mexico	Spanish
2002 (75th)	Hero	英雄	Zhang Yimou	China	Mandarin
2002 (75th)	The Man Without a Past	Mies vailla menneisyyttä	Aki Kaurismäki	Finland	Finnish
2002 (75th)	Zus & Zo		Paula van der Oest	Netherlands	Dutch
2003 (76th)	**The Barbarian Invasions**	**Les Invasions barbares**	**Denys Arcand**	**Canada**	**French**
2003 (76th)	Evil	Ondskan	Mikael Håfström	Sweden	Swedish
2003 (76th)	The Twilight Samurai	たそがれ清兵衛	Yoji Yamada	Japan	Japanese
2003 (76th)	Twin Sisters	De tweeling	Ben Sombogaart	Netherlands	Dutch
2003 (76th)	Želary		Ondřej Trojan	Czech Republic	Czech
2004 (77th)	**The Sea Inside**	**Mar adentro**	**Alejandro Amenábar**	**Spain**	**Spanish**
2004 (77th)	As It Is in Heaven	Så som i himmelen	Kay Pollak	Sweden	Swedish
2004 (77th)	The Chorus	Les choristes	Christophe Barratier	France	French
2004 (77th)	Downfall	Der Untergang	Oliver Hirschbiegel	Germany	German
2004 (77th)	Yesterday		Darrell Roodt	South Africa	Zulu
2005 (78th)	**Tsotsi**		**Gavin Hood**	**South Africa**	**Zulu, Xhosa, Afrikaans, Setswana**
2005 (78th)	Don’t Tell	La bestia nel cuore	Cristina Comencini	Italy	Italian
2005 (78th)	Joyeux Noël		Christian Carion	France	French, English, German
2005 (78th)	Paradise Now	الجنة الآن	Hany Abu-Assad	Palestine^{[P]}	Arabic
2005 (78th)	Sophie Scholl – The Final Days	Sophie Scholl – Die letzten Tage	Marc Rothemund	Germany	German
2006 (79th)	**The Lives of Others**	**Das Leben der Anderen**	**Florian Henckel von Donnersmarck**	**Germany**	**German**
2006 (79th)	After the Wedding	Efter brylluppet	Susanne Bier	Denmark	Danish, Swedish, Hindi, English
2006 (79th)	Days of Glory	Indigènes	Rachid Bouchareb	Algeria	Arabic; French
2006 (79th)	Pan's Labyrinth	El laberinto del fauno	Guillermo del Toro	Mexico	Spanish
2006 (79th)	Water	वाटर	Deepa Mehta	Canada	Hindi
2007 (80th)	**The Counterfeiters**	**Die Fälscher**	**Stefan Ruzowitzky**	**Austria**	**German**
2007 (80th)	Beaufort	בופור	Joseph Cedar	Israel	Hebrew
2007 (80th)	Katyń		Andrzej Wajda	Poland	Polish
2007 (80th)	Mongol	Монгол	Sergei Bodrov	Kazakhstan	Mongolian, Mandarin
2007 (80th)	12		Nikita Mikhalkov	Russia	Russian, Chechen
2008 (81st)	**Departures**	**おくりびと**	**Yōjirō Takita**	**Japan**	**Japanese**
2008 (81st)	The Baader Meinhof Complex	Der Baader Meinhof Komplex	Uli Edel	Germany	German
2008 (81st)	The Class	Entre les murs	Laurent Cantet	France	French
2008 (81st)	Revanche		Götz Spielmann	Austria	German
2008 (81st)	Waltz with Bashir	ואלס עם באשיר	Ari Folman	Israel	Hebrew
2009 (82nd)	**The Secret in Their Eyes**	**El secreto de sus ojos**	**Juan José Campanella**	**Argentina**	**Spanish**
2009 (82nd)	Ajami	עג'מי / عجمي	Scandar Copti, Yaron Shani	Israel	Arabic, Hebrew
2009 (82nd)	The Milk of Sorrow	La teta asustada	Claudia Llosa	Peru	Spanish, Quechua
2009 (82nd)	A Prophet	Un prophète	Jacques Audiard	France	French, Arabic
2009 (82nd)	The White Ribbon	Das weiße Band	Michael Haneke	Germany	German

=== 2010s ===
Year	Film Title used in nomination	Original Title	Director(s)	Submitting Countries	Language(s)
2010 (83rd)	**In a Better World**	**Hævnen**	**Susanne Bier**	**Denmark**	**Danish, Swedish, English, Arabic**
2010 (83rd)	Biutiful		Alejandro González Iñárritu	Mexico	Spanish
2010 (83rd)	Dogtooth	Κυνόδοντας	Yorgos Lanthimos	Greece	Greek
2010 (83rd)	Incendies		Denis Villeneuve	Canada	French, Arabic
2010 (83rd)	Outside the Law	Hors-la-loi /خارجون عن القانون	Rachid Bouchareb	Algeria	French, Arabic
2011 (84th)	**A Separation**	**جدایی نادر از سیمین**	**Asghar Farhadi**	**Iran**	**Persian**
2011 (84th)	Bullhead	Rundskop	Michaël R. Roskam	Belgium	Dutch
2011 (84th)	Footnote	הערת שוליים	Joseph Cedar	Israel	Hebrew
2011 (84th)	In Darkness	W ciemności	Agnieszka Holland	Poland	Polish
2011 (84th)	Monsieur Lazhar		Philippe Falardeau	Canada	French
2012 (85th)	**Amour**		**Michael Haneke**	**Austria**	**French**
2012 (85th)	Kon-Tiki		Joachim Rønning and Espen Sandberg	Norway	Norwegian
2012 (85th)	No		Pablo Larraín	Chile	Spanish
2012 (85th)	A Royal Affair	En kongelig affære	Nikolaj Arcel	Denmark	Danish
2012 (85th)	War Witch	Rebelle	Kim Nguyen	Canada	French, Lingala
2013 (86th)	**The Great Beauty**	**La grande bellezza**	**Paolo Sorrentino**	**Italy**	**Italian**
2013 (86th)	The Broken Circle Breakdown		Felix van Groeningen	Belgium	Dutch
2013 (86th)	The Hunt	Jagten	Thomas Vinterberg	Denmark	Danish
2013 (86th)	The Missing Picture	L'image manquante	Rithy Panh	Cambodia	French
2013 (86th)	Omar	عمر	Hany Abu-Assad	Palestine	Arabic
2014 (87th)	**Ida**		**Paweł Pawlikowski**	**Poland**	**Polish**
2014 (87th)	Leviathan	Левиафан	Andrey Zvyagintsev	Russia	Russian
2014 (87th)	Tangerines	მანდარინები / Mandariinid	Zaza Urushadze	Estonia	Estonian, Russian, Georgian
2014 (87th)	Timbuktu		Abderrahmane Sissako	Mauritania	Tamasheq, Bambara, Arabic, French
2014 (87th)	Wild Tales	Relatos Salvajes	Damián Szifron	Argentina	Spanish
2015 (88th)	**Son of Saul**	**Saul fia**	**László Nemes**	**Hungary**	**Hungarian**
2015 (88th)	Embrace of the Serpent	El abrazo de la serpiente	Ciro Guerra	Colombia	Cubeo, Huitoto, Ticuna, Wanano, Spanish, Portuguese, German, Catalan, Latin, English
2015 (88th)	Mustang		Deniz Gamze Ergüven	France	Turkish
2015 (88th)	Theeb	ذيب	Naji Abu Nowar	Jordan	Arabic
2015 (88th)	A War	Krigen	Tobias Lindholm	Denmark	Danish
2016 (89th)	**The Salesman**	**فروشنده**	**Asghar Farhadi**	**Iran**	**Persian**
2016 (89th)	Land of Mine	Under sandet	Martin Zandvliet	Denmark	German, Danish
2016 (89th)	A Man Called Ove	En man som heter Ove	Hannes Holm	Sweden	Swedish
2016 (89th)	Tanna		Martin Butler and Bentley Dean	Australia	Nauvhal
2016 (89th)	Toni Erdmann		Maren Ade	Germany	German, English, Romanian
2017 (90th)	**A Fantastic Woman**	**Una mujer fantástica**	**Sebastián Lelio**	**Chile**	**Spanish**
2017 (90th)	The Insult	قضية رقم ٢٣	Ziad Doueiri	Lebanon	Lebanese Arabic
2017 (90th)	Loveless	Нелюбовь	Andrey Zvyagintsev	Russia	Russian
2017 (90th)	On Body and Soul	Testről és lélekről	Ildikó Enyedi	Hungary	Hungarian
2017 (90th)	The Square		Ruben Östlund	Sweden	Swedish, Danish, English
2018 (91st)	**Roma**		**Alfonso Cuarón**	**Mexico**	**Spanish, Mixtec**
2018 (91st)	Capernaum	کفرناحوم	Nadine Labaki	Lebanon	Lebanese Arabic
2018 (91st)	Cold War	Zimna wojna	Paweł Pawlikowski	Poland	Polish
2018 (91st)	Never Look Away	Werk ohne Autor	Florian Henckel von Donnersmarck	Germany	German
2018 (91st)	Shoplifters	万引き家族	Hirokazu Kore-eda	Japan	Japanese
2019 (92nd)	**Parasite**	**기생충**	**Bong Joon Ho**	**South Korea**	**Korean**
2019 (92nd)	Corpus Christi	Boże Ciało	Jan Komasa	Poland	Polish
2019 (92nd)	Honeyland	Медена земја	Tamara Kotevska and Ljubomir Stefanov	North Macedonia	Macedonian, Turkish, Bosnian
2019 (92nd)	Les Misérables		Ladj Ly	France	French
2019 (92nd)	Pain and Glory	Dolor y Gloria	Pedro Almodóvar	Spain	Spanish

=== 2020s ===
Year	Film Title used in nomination	Original Title	Director(s)	Submitting Countries	Language(s)
2020/21 (93rd)	**Another Round**	**Druk**	**Thomas Vinterberg**	**Denmark**	**Danish, Swedish**
2020/21 (93rd)	Better Days	少年的你	Derek Tsang	Hong Kong	Mandarin, English
2020/21 (93rd)	Collective	Colectiv	Alexander Nanau	Romania	Romanian, English
2020/21 (93rd)	The Man Who Sold His Skin	الرجل الذي باع ظهره	Kaouther Ben Hania	Tunisia	Arabic, English, French, Flemish
2020/21 (93rd)	Quo Vadis, Aida?		Jasmila Žbanić	Bosnia and Herzegovina	Bosnian, English, Serbian, Dutch
2021 (94th)	**Drive My Car**	**ドライブ・マイ・カー**	**Ryusuke Hamaguchi**	**Japan**	**Japanese, English, Korean, Korean Sign Language, Mandarin, Tagalog, German, Indonesian**
2021 (94th)	Flee	Flugt	Jonas Poher Rasmussen	Denmark	Danish
2021 (94th)	The Hand of God	È stata la mano di Dio	Paolo Sorrentino	Italy	Italian
2021 (94th)	Lunana: A Yak in the Classroom	ལུང་ནག་ན	Pawo Choyning Dorji	Bhutan	Dzongkha
2021 (94th)	The Worst Person in the World	Verdens verste menneske	Joachim Trier	Norway	Norwegian
2022 (95th)	**All Quiet on the Western Front**	**Im Westen nichts Neues**	**Edward Berger**	**Germany**	**German, French**
2022 (95th)	Argentina, 1985		Santiago Mitre	Argentina	Spanish
2022 (95th)	Close		Lukas Dhont	Belgium	French, Dutch
2022 (95th)	EO	IO	Jerzy Skolimowski	Poland	Polish, Italian, English, French
2022 (95th)	The Quiet Girl	An Cailín Ciúin	Colm Bairéad	(Republic of Ireland) Ireland	Irish, English
2023 (96th)	**The Zone of Interest**		**Jonathan Glazer**	**United Kingdom**	**German, Polish, Yiddish**
2023 (96th)	Io Capitano		Matteo Garrone	Italy	Wolof, French
2023 (96th)	Perfect Days		Wim Wenders	Japan	Japanese
2023 (96th)	Society of the Snow	La sociedad de la nieve	J. A. Bayona	Spain	Spanish
2023 (96th)	The Teachers' Lounge	Das Lehrerzimmer	İlker Çatak	Germany	German, Turkish, Polish, English
2024 (97th)	**I'm Still Here**	**Ainda Estou Aqui**	**Walter Salles**	**Brazil**	**Portuguese**
2024 (97th)	Emilia Pérez		Jacques Audiard	France	Spanish, English
2024 (97th)	Flow	Straume	Gints Zilbalodis	Latvia	No dialogue
2024 (97th)	The Girl with the Needle	Pigen med nålen	Magnus von Horn	Denmark	Danish
2024 (97th)	The Seed of the Sacred Fig	دانه‌ی انجیر معابد	Mohammad Rasoulof	Germany	Persian
2025 (98th)	**Sentimental Value**	**Affeksjonsverdi**	**Joachim Trier**	**Norway**	**Norwegian, English**
2025 (98th)	It Was Just an Accident	یک تصادف ساده	Jafar Panahi	France	Persian, Azerbaijani
2025 (98th)	The Secret Agent	O Agente Secreto	Kleber Mendonça Filho	Brazil	Portuguese, German
2025 (98th)	Sirāt		Oliver Laxe	Spain	Spanish, French, Arabic
2025 (98th)	The Voice of Hind Rajab	صوت هند رجب	Kaouther Ben Hania	Tunisia	Arabic

== Age superlatives ==
Record	Director	Film	Age
Oldest winner	Luis Buñuel	The Discreet Charm of the Bourgeoisie	73 years, 33 days
Oldest nominee	Jerzy Skolimowski	EO	84 years, 264 days
Youngest winner	Claude Lelouch	A Man and a Woman	29 years, 162 days
Youngest nominee	Tamara Kotevska	Honeyland	26 years, 157 days

== Multiple wins and nominations ==
=== Multiple wins ===
Six directors have won the award more than once.

Wins	Director	Films
4	(Italy) Vittorio De Sica	Shoe-Shine, Bicycle Thieves, Yesterday, Today and Tomorrow and The Garden of the Finzi Continis
4	(Italy) Federico Fellini	La Strada, Nights of Cabiria, 8½ and Amarcord
3	(Sweden) Ingmar Bergman	The Virgin Spring, Through a Glass Darkly and Fanny and Alexander
2	(France) René Clément	The Walls of Malapaga and Forbidden Games
2	(Iran) Asghar Farhadi	A Separation and The Salesman
2	(Japan) Akira Kurosawa	Rashomon and Dersu Uzala

=== Multiple nominations ===
Nominations	Director	Films
5	(Italy) Vittorio De Sica	Shoe-Shine, Bicycle Thieves, Yesterday, Today and Tomorrow, Marriage Italian Style and The Garden of the Finzi Continis
4	(Italy) Federico Fellini	La Strada, Nights of Cabiria, 8½ and Amarcord
4	(Japan) Akira Kurosawa	Rashomon, Dodes'ka-den, Dersu Uzala and Kagemusha (The Shadow Warrior)
4	(Spain) José Luis Garci	To Begin Again, Double Feature, Course Completed and The Grandfather
4	(Italy) Mario Monicelli	The Usual Unidentified Thieves, The Great War, The Girl with the Pistol and Viva Italia!
4	(Italy) Ettore Scola	A Special Day, Viva Italia!, Le Bal and The Family
4	(Hungary) István Szabó	Confidence, Mephisto, Colonel Redl, Hanussen
4	(Poland) Andrzej Wajda	The Promised Land, The Maids of Wilko, Man of Iron and Katyń
3	(Spain) Pedro Almodóvar	Women on the Verge of a Nervous Breakdown, All About My Mother and Pain and Glory
3	(Canada) Denys Arcand	The Decline of the American Empire, Jesus of Montreal and The Barbarian Invasions
3	(Sweden) Ingmar Bergman	The Virgin Spring, Through a Glass Darkly and Fanny and Alexander
3	(France) Rachid Bouchareb	Dust of Life, Days of Glory and Outside the Law
3	(Spain) Luis Buñuel	Tristana, The Discreet Charm of the Bourgeoisie and That Obscure Object of Desire
3	(France) René Clément	The Walls of Malapaga, Forbidden Games and Gervaise
3	(Taiwan) Ang Lee	The Wedding Banquet, Eat Drink Man Woman and Crouching Tiger, Hidden Dragon
3	(Russia) Nikita Mikhalkov	Close to Eden, Burnt by the Sun and 12
3	(Israel) Moshé Mizrahi	I Love You Rosa, The House on Chelouche Street and Madame Rosa
3	(Spain) Carlos Saura	Mama Turns 100, Carmen and Tango
3	(Sweden) Jan Troell	The Emigrants, The New Land and Flight of the Eagle
3	(France) François Truffaut	Stolen Kisses, Day for Night and The Last Metro
3	(Sweden) Bo Widerberg	Raven's End, Ådalen 31 and All Things Fair
3	(China) Zhang Yimou	Ju Dou, Raise the Red Lantern and Hero
2	(Palestine) Hany Abu-Assad	Paradise Now and Omar
2	(France) Jacques Audiard	A Prophet and Emilia Pérez
2	(Tunisia) Kaouther Ben Hania	The Man Who Sold His Skin and The Voice of Hind Rajab
2	(Denmark) Susanne Bier	After the Wedding and In a Better World
2	(Russia) Sergei Bodrov	Prisoner of the Mountains and Mongol
2	(Greece) Michael Cacoyannis	Electra and Iphigenia
2	(Israel) Joseph Cedar	Beaufort and Footnote
2	(Belgium) Gérard Corbiau	The Music Teacher and Farinelli: Il Castrato
2	(Spain) Jaime de Armiñán	My Dearest Senorita and The Nest
2	(Hungary) Zoltán Fábri	The Boys of Paul Street and Hungarians
2	(Iran) Asghar Farhadi	A Separation and The Salesman
2	(Czechoslovakia) Miloš Forman	Loves of a Blonde and The Firemen's Ball
2	(Greece) Vasilis Georgiadis	The Red Lanterns and Blood on the Land
2	(Mexico) Alejandro González Iñárritu	Amores perros and Biutiful
2	(Austria) Michael Haneke	The White Ribbon and Amour
2	(Germany) Florian Henckel von Donnersmarck	The Lives of Others and Never Look Away
2	(Poland) Agnieszka Holland	Angry Harvest and In Darkness
2	(Argentina) Juan José Campanella	Son of the Bride and The Secret in Their Eyes
2	(Israel) Ephraim Kishon	Sallah Shabati and The Policeman
2	(France) Claude Lelouch	A Man and a Woman and Live for Life
2	(Germany) Caroline Link	Beyond Silence and Nowhere in Africa
2	(Chile) Miguel Littin	Letters from Marusia and Alsino and the Condor
2	(France) Louis Malle	Lacombe, Lucien and Au Revoir Les Enfants (Goodbye Children)
2	(Czechoslovakia) Jiří Menzel	Closely Watched Trains and My Sweet Little Village
2	(Japan) Noboru Nakamura	Twin Sisters of Kyoto and Portrait of Chieko
2	(Poland) Paweł Pawlikowski	Ida and Cold War
2	(Socialist Federal Republic of Yugoslavia) Aleksandar Petrović	Three and I Even Met Happy Gypsies
2	(Italy) Gillo Pontecorvo	Kapo and The Battle of Algiers
2	(Netherlands) Fons Rademakers	The Village on the River and The Assault
2	(Italy) Dino Risi	Scent of a Woman and Viva Italia!
2	(Soviet Union) Stanislav Rostotsky	The Dawns Here Are Quiet and White Bim Black Ear
2	(Spain) Francisco Rovira Beleta	Los Tarantos and Bewitched Love
2	(Brazil) Walter Salles	Central Station and I'm Still Here
2	(Switzerland) Maximilian Schell	First Love and The Pedestrian
2	(Italy) Paolo Sorrentino	The Great Beauty and The Hand of God
2	(Czechoslovakia) Jan Svěrák	The Elementary School and Kolya
2	(Italy) Giuseppe Tornatore	Cinema Paradiso and The Star Maker
2	(Norway) Joachim Trier	The Worst Person in the World and Sentimental Value
2	(Denmark) Thomas Vinterberg	The Hunt and Another Round
2	(France) Régis Wargnier	Indochine and East-West
2	(Russia) Andrey Zvyagintsev	Leviathan and Loveless

== Shortlisted finalists ==
Since the 79th Academy Awards (2006), a nine-film shortlist has been announced before the nominations, which then has been reduced to the five official nominees. The shortlist was expanded from nine to ten at the 92nd Academy Awards (2019), and from ten to fifteen at the 93rd Academy Awards (2020).

Year	Finalists	Ref.
2006	Avenue Montaigne – France; Black Book – Netherlands; Vitus – Switzerland; Volver – Spain (nominated for Best Actress)	
2007	Days of Darkness – Canada; The Trap – Serbia; The Unknown Woman – Italy; The Year My Parents Went on Vacation – Brazil	
2008	Everlasting Moments – Sweden; The Necessities of Life – Canada; Tear This Heart Out – Mexico; Three Monkeys – Turkey	
2009	Kelin – Kazakhstan; Samson & Delilah – Australia; Winter in Wartime – Netherlands; The World Is Big and Salvation Lurks Around the Corner – Bulgaria	
2010	Confessions – Japan; Even the Rain – Spain; Life, Above All – South Africa; Simple Simon – Sweden	
2011	Omar Killed Me – Morocco; Pina – Germany (nominated for Best Documentary Feature Film); Warriors of the Rainbow: Seediq Bale – Taiwan; SuperClásico – Denmark	
2012	Beyond the Hills – Romania; The Deep – Iceland; Intouchables – France; Sister – Switzerland	
2013	An Episode in the Life of an Iron Picker – Bosnia and Herzegovina; The Grandmaster – Hong Kong (nominated for Best Cinematography and Best Costume Design); The Notebook – Hungary; Two Lives – Germany	
2014	Accused – Netherlands; Corn Island – Georgia; Force Majeure – Sweden; The Liberator – Venezuela	
2015	The Brand New Testament – Belgium; The Fencer – Finland; Labyrinth of Lies – Germany; Viva – Ireland	
2016	It's Only the End of the World – Canada; The King's Choice – Norway; My Life as a Zucchini – Switzerland (nominated for Best Animated Feature); Paradise – Russia	
2017	Félicité – Senegal; Foxtrot – Israel; In the Fade – Germany; The Wound – South Africa	
2018	Ayka – Kazakhstan; Birds of Passage – Colombia; Burning – South Korea; The Guilty – Denmark	
2019	Atlantics – Senegal; Beanpole – Russia; The Painted Bird – Czech Republic; Those Who Remained – Hungary; Truth and Justice – Estonia	
2020/21	Charlatan – Czech Republic; Dear Comrades! – Russia; Hope – Norway; I'm No Longer Here – Mexico; La Llorona – Guatemala; The Mole Agent – Chile (nominated for Best Documentary Feature Film); Night of the Kings – Ivory Coast; A Sun – Taiwan; Sun Children – Iran; Two of Us – France	
2021	Compartment No. 6 – Finland; The Good Boss – Spain; Great Freedom – Austria; A Hero – Iran; Hive – Kosovo; I'm Your Man – Germany; Lamb – Iceland; Playground – Belgium; Plaza Catedral – Panama; Prayers for the Stolen – Mexico	
2022	Bardo, False Chronicle of a Handful of Truths – Mexico (nominated for Best Cinematography); The Blue Caftan – Morocco; Cairo Conspiracy – Sweden; Corsage – Austria; Decision to Leave – South Korea; Holy Spider – Denmark; Joyland – Pakistan; Last Film Show – India; Return to Seoul – Cambodia; Saint Omer – France	
2023	Amerikatsi – Armenia; Fallen Leaves – Finland; Four Daughters – Tunisia (nominated for Best Documentary Feature Film); Godland – Iceland; The Monk and the Gun – Bhutan; The Mother of All Lies – Morocco; The Promised Land – Denmark; The Taste of Things – France; Totem – Mexico; 20 Days in Mariupol – Ukraine (won Best Documentary Feature Film)	
2024	Armand – Norway; Dahomey – Senegal; From Ground Zero – Palestine; How to Make Millions Before Grandma Dies – Thailand; Kneecap – Ireland; Santosh – United Kingdom; Touch – Iceland; Universal Language – Canada; Vermiglio – Italy; Waves – Czech Republic	
2025	All That's Left of You – Jordan; Belén - Argentina; Homebound – India; Kokuho – Japan (nominated for Best Makeup and Hairstyling); Late Shift – Switzerland; Left-Handed Girl – Taiwan; No Other Choice – South Korea; Palestine 36 – Palestine; The President's Cake – Iraq; Sound of Falling – Germany	

== See also ==
- Academy Award for Best International Feature Film
- List of countries by number of Academy Awards for Best International Feature Film
- List of actors nominated for Academy Awards for non-English performances
- List of Academy Award–winning foreign-language films (in categories other than the International Feature Film category itself)
- Saturn Award for Best International Film

== Notes ==
A: Europe's tally includes three awards won by the Soviet Union and an award won by Russia. It also includes five Special/Honorary Awards: two won by Italy, two won by France and one shared between them for The Walls of Malapaga (1949).
B: Japan's four-award tally includes three Honorary Awards.
C: Shoe-Shine (1946) won a Special Award because "the high quality of this motion picture, brought to eloquent life in a country scarred by war, is proof to the world that the creative spirit can triumph over adversity".
D: Monsieur Vincent (1947) won a Special Foreign Language Film Award. It was voted by the Academy Board of Governors as the most outstanding foreign language film released in the United States during 1948.
E: Bicycle Thieves (1948) won a Special Foreign Language Film Award. It was voted by the Academy Board of Governors as the most outstanding foreign language film released in the United States during 1949.
F: The Walls of Malapaga (1949) won an Honorary Foreign Language Film Award. It was voted by the Board of Governors as the most outstanding foreign language film released in the United States in 1950.
G: Rashomon (1950) won an Honorary Foreign Language Film Award. It was voted by the Board of Governors as the most outstanding foreign language film released in the United States during 1951.
H: Forbidden Games (1952) won an Honorary Foreign Language Film Award. It was named Best Foreign Language Film first released in the United States during 1952.
I: Gate of Hell (1953) won an Honorary Foreign Language Film Award. It was named Best Foreign Language Film first released in the United States during 1954.
J: Samurai, The Legend of Musashi (1954) won an Honorary Foreign Language Film Award. It was named Best Foreign Language Film first released in the United States during 1955.
K^{1} ^{2} ^{3} ^{4} ^{5} : For the 29th Academy Awards, the names of the producers were included in the nominations for the Foreign Language Film category. Dino De Laurentiis and Carlo Ponti won the award for La Strada (1954). Gyula Trebitsch and Walter Koppel were nominated for The Captain of Köpenick (1956), Annie Dorfmann for Gervaise (1956), Masayuki Takagi for Harp of Burma (1956), and O. Dalsgaard-Olsen for Qivitoq (1956).
L: The film received its 1969 nomination under the title My Night with Maud. It had no U.S. distributor at the time. When it was released in Los Angeles on April 15, 1970, it became eligible for consideration for Academy Awards in other categories, and received a 1970 nomination for Writing under the title My Night at Maud's. Today, the latter title is the most commonly used when referring to the film in the English-speaking world.
M: Originally released under the title La Victoire en chantant, the film was reissued in France under the title Noirs et Blancs en couleur (a literal French translation of its English title Black and White in Color) following its 1976 Academy Award win.
N: Although films produced inside the United States are not eligible for consideration for the Best Foreign Language Film Award, those produced in U.S. overseas possessions were eligible at the time. Puerto Rico, an unincorporated territory of the United States, was thus able to receive a nomination for What Happened to Santiago (1989). However, this rule was changed in 2011 barring Puerto Rican submissions.
O: This is not an official nomination. After the nominations were announced, information came to light that showed this film was wholly produced in Argentina, and had insufficient Uruguayan artistic control. The film was declared ineligible and removed from the final ballot.
P: Paradise Now (2005) was initially nominated as a submission from Palestine and presented as such on the "official Academy website". Archived from the original on April 9, 2006. However, following protests from pro-Israeli groups in the United States, the Academy decided to designate it as a submission from the Palestinian Authority, a move that was decried by the film's director Hany Abu-Assad. During the awards ceremony, the film was eventually announced by presenter Will Smith as a submission from the Palestinian Territories.
