= MAMI 21st Mumbai Film Festival =

Film Festival in Mumbai, India

Jio MAMI 21st Mumbai Film Festival with Star
- Opening film: Moothon by Geetu Mohandas
- Closing film: Saand Ki Aankh by Tushar Hiranandani
- Location: Mumbai, India
- Awards: India Gold: Eeb Allay Ooo! by Prateek Vats; International Competition: Honeyland by Ljubomir Stefanov and Tamara Kotevska
- Directors: Anupama Chopra
- Artistic director: Smriti Kiran
- Festival date: Opening: 17 October 2019; Closing: 24 October 2019
- Website: www.mumbaifilmfestival.com

MAMI Mumbai Film Festival
- 22nd (cancelled); 2023 20th

The MAMI 21st Mumbai Film Festival (full title: "Jio MAMI 21st Mumbai Film Festival with Star") took place between 17 and 24 October 2019 in Mumbai, India. It was the only edition of the festival during which actor Deepika Padukone served as the chairperson of the Mumbai Academy of the Moving Image (MAMI).

Over 220 films were screened in this edition of the festival, spread out across eight venues located in both the city's Suburban and City districts.

It was also the final edition of the festival to host the India Gold and International competitions, which were replaced with the South Asia Competition in 2023. In the India Gold competition, Eeb Allay Ooo! by Prateek Vats won the Golden Gateway Award, while Bombay Rose by Geetanjali Rao won the Silver Gateway Award. In the International Competition, the Golden Gateway Award went to Honeyland by Ljubomir Stefanov and Tamara Kotevska, while the Silver Gateway Award went to Buoyancy by Rodd Rathjen.

During this edition, the festival bestowed the Excellence in Cinema Award to veteran Indian actor Deepti Naval and Brazilian filmmaker Fernando Meirelles.

== Juries ==
The following juries were constituted for this edition of the festival:

=== India Gold ===
- Franklin Leonard, American film executive and founder of The Black List (Head of Jury)
- Christian Jeune, French deputy General Delegate at the Cannes Film Festival
- Col Needham, British entrepreneur and founder of IMDb
- Grainne Humphreys, Irish Festival Director at the Dublin International Film Festival

=== International Competition ===
- Hany Abu-Assad, Palestinian-Dutch filmmaker (Head of Jury)
- Zoya Akhtar, Indian filmmaker
- Julie Huntsinger, American Executive Director of the Telluride Film Festival
- Mark Adams, British Artistic Director of the Edinburgh International Film Festival
- Vetrimaaran, Indian filmmaker, film producer, and screenwriter

=== Dimensions Mumbai ===
- Taapsee Pannu, Indian actor (Head of Jury)
- Kanika Dhillon, Indian author and screenwriter
- Shweta Venkat Mathew, Indian film editor
- Avinash Tiwary, Indian actor
- Karan Anshuman, Indian filmmaker and screenwriter

=== Royal Stag Barrel Select Large Short Films ===
- Vinay Pathak, Indian actor (Head of Jury)
- Vijay Varma, Indian actor
- Roshan Mathew, Indian actor

=== Film Critics Guild Award ===
- Shubhra Gupta, Indian film critic at The Indian Express
- Rajeev Masand, Indian film critic at CNN-News18
- Shubha Shetty Saha, Indian film journalist

=== Manish Acharya Award for New Voices in Indian Cinema ===
- Poulomi Das, Indian film critic and editor
- Aadish Keluskar, Indian filmmaker

=== Discovering India ===
- Mike McCahill, British film critic
- Namrata Joshi, Indian film critic

=== Half Ticket ===
The Half Ticket juries were composed of schoolchildren in two age groups, 5-12 years (Aishwarya Venkatesh, Gauri Sajith, Kyathi Kottari, and Saher Sakhpara), and 13-17 years (Amay Doshi, Janice Mistry, Karan Rajput, and Smriti Singh).

== Programmes ==
The Jio MAMI 21st Mumbai Film Festival was organised into the following programmes:

- India Gold – Films from across India (fiction and documentary), competing for the associated Golden Gateway Award, amongst other awards.
- International Competition – Films from debut filmmakers from across the world, competing for the associated Golden Gateway Award, amongst other awards.
- Dimensions Mumbai – Short films from emerging Mumbai-based filmmakers between the ages of 18 and 25, competing for the associated Golden Gateway Award, amongst other awards.
- Royal Stag Barrel Select Large Short Films – Short films, competing for the associated award.
- After Dark – Independent genre films from across the world, out of competition.
- World Cinema – Films from across the world, out of competition.
- Special Presentation: Egyptian Cinema – Three films from alternative Egyptian cinema.
- Special Presentation: Qatar-India Year of Culture 2019 – Three short films from Qatari cinema.
- India Story – Films from across India, out of competition.
- Spotlight – Curated films from across India that 'push boundaries', out of competition.
- Discovering India – Films that either follow an Indian in the West, or a Western film that features Indian cast, crew, or themes; competing for the associated Best Film Award.
- Rendezvous with French Cinema – Contemporary films from French cinema, out of competition.
- Marathi Talkies – Three contemporary films in the Marathi language, out of competition.
- Half Ticket – Feature-length and short films from across the world showcasing children's cinema, competing for the associated Golden Gateway Awards in two age categories.
- Restored Classics – Restored versions of three classic films from across the world.
- Play – Premieres of series from streaming services.
- Tribute – Dedicated in 2019 to Indian filmmaker Mrinal Sen, who died in 2018, represented by his 1969 film Bhuvan Shome.

Apart from these programmes, the festival screened Moothon by Geetu Mohandas as the opening film, and Saand Ki Aankh by Tushar Hiranandani as the closing film. Also screened as a Special Presentation was the 2019 documentary Kaifinama by Sumantra Ghosal, whose subject is the Indian Urdu-language poet Kaifi Azmi.

== Awards ==
=== India Gold ===
- Golden Gateway Award: Eeb Allay Ooo! by Prateek Vats
- Silver Gateway Award: Bombay Rose by Geetanjali Rao

=== International Competition ===
- Golden Gateway Award: Honeyland by Ljubomir Stefanov and Tamara Kotevska
- Silver Gateway Award: Buoyancy by Rodd Rathjen
- Grand Jury Prize: Talking About Trees by Suhaib Gasmelbari
- Special Jury Mentions: You Will Die at Twenty by Amjad Abu Alala and Sole by Carlo Sironi

=== Dimensions Mumbai ===
- Golden Gateway Award: Batti by Akshay Sarjerao Danavale
- Silver Gateway Award: Attention by Shubham Sanap
- Jury Special Mentions: Unsaid by Deeksha Mhaskar and Apna Apna Andaz by Avishkar Bharadwaj

=== Other Awards ===
- Royal Stag Barrel Select Large Short Films Award: Indian Circus by Nikhil Rao
- Special Award for Discovering India: The Illegal by Danish Renzu
- Film Critics Guild Award: Just Like That (Aise Hi) by Kislay
- Film Critics Guild Award - Special Jury Mention: Shut Up Sona by Deepti Gupta
- Manish Acharya Award for New Voices in Indian Cinema: Gamak Ghar by Achal Mishra, and Bombay Rose by Geetanjali Rao
- Young Critics Choice Award: Eeb Allay Ooo! by Prateek Vats
- Half Ticket - Golden Gateway (Age 5-12): Ailo's Journey by Guillaume Maidatchevsky
- Half Ticket - Golden Gateway (Age 13-17): Girl in the Hallway by Valerie Barnhart
