= Groupe Mémoire - Groep Herinnering =

Groupe Mémoire - Groep Herinnering (GM-GH) is a Belgian association set up in memory of the Belgian political prisoners of the Second World War.

== Purpose ==
GM-GH has as its main goal to keep alive the legacy and memory of the Belgian political prisoners and resistance fighters during the Second World War. The association also favors human rights, and respect for human dignity. (Note: article 3 of the GM-GH statute (available in French and Dutch)) The activities of the association include lectures, publications, events, press conferences and educational days.

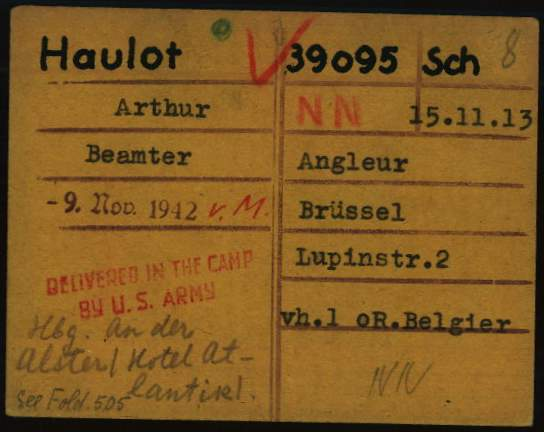
Registration card of Arthur Haulot as a prisoner at Dachau Nazi Concentration Camp

== Historical background ==
The GM-GH was founded in 1993 by two Belgian resistance fighters and political prisoners of the Second World War, (Note: only available in French) .

Baron Arthur Haulot, then-chairman of Vriendenkring Dachau together with his friend Baron Paul Halter, then-chairman of the Auschwitz Foundation. The founding of the association coincided with the fiftieth anniversary of the liberation of the Nazi extermination camps in 1945. Their successors were (in chronological order): André Wynen (former president of the World Medical Association WMA) Paul Baeten (Note: the new GM-GH president; article in La Libre Belgique) and Yves Louis (Belgian delegate to the WMA starting 2022, and as an assessor on the WMA Medical Ethics Committee (2022-2023).

With the death of Philippe Claes and Pieter-Paul Baeten came an end to the era of political prisoners at the helm of the association. (Note: article in La Libre Belgique regarding the history of the GM-GH) The 'children of the second generation' felt there was a need to continue the association's existence and continue the memory of the political prisoners of the Second World War.

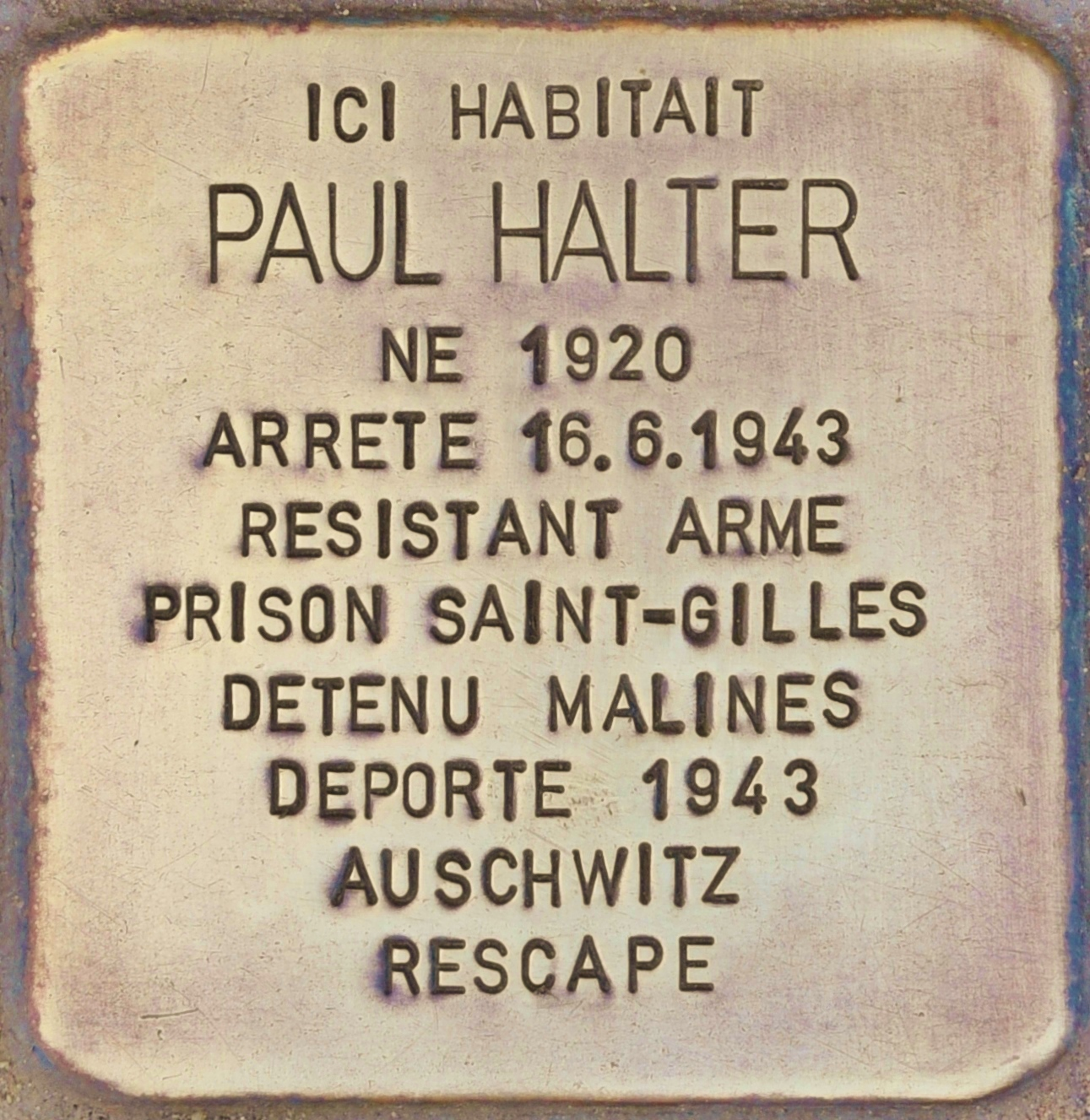
'Stumbling block' (Stolperstein) for Paul Halter

== Activities ==
From its inception, the GM-GH has been active in Belgian society at educational and political level.

=== Educational ===
In 1995, the GM-GH partnered with the King Baudouin Foundation to set up "50 years later", a memory project intended for Belgian school-goers, both in the Dutch and French speaking regions of the country. The project was under the auspices of the then GM-GH president Haulot. It consisted of a 5-day educational trip by train from Brussels to Auschwitz organized for European youngsters.

The 'Train de la démocratie et de la liberté - Buchenwald - Mittelbau-Dora concentration camp (Allemagne)' (the Train of Freedom to Buchenwald - Mittelbau-Dora concentration camp (Germany)) was an educational sponsored journey which took place in 2008 for 1000 youngsters (400 Belgians and 600 other Europeans) to meet at and learn about the Buchenwald Nazi camp and what transpired there. From the Belgian side, the trip was organized by the National Institute of War Invalids (l'Institut National des Invalides de Guerre, Anciens Combattants et Victimes de Guerre) and the International Federation of Resistance Fighters. Pieter-Paul Baeten accompanied the youngsters on this trip as president of the Buchenwald association and president of the GM-GH. (Note: Article by the then President of French speaking Brussels parliament)

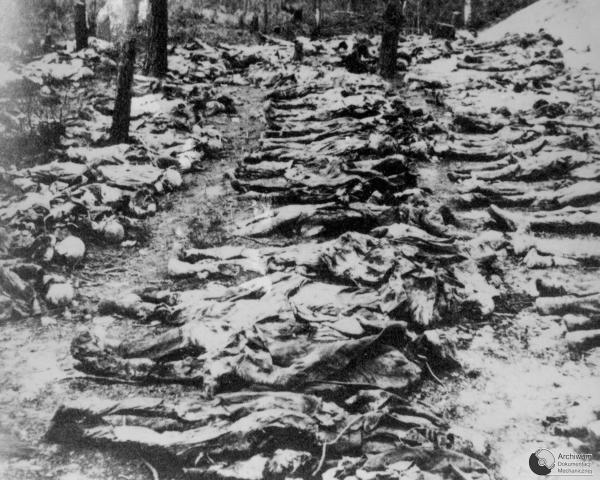
Katyn massacre

The GM – GH organized a symposium entitled "La bioéthique 75 ans après le procès des médecins à Nuremberg" (bio-ethics 75 years after the Nuremberg doctor's trial). It was held in the Tournai town hall, Tournai, Belgium on 26 November 2022 under the chair of Dr Yves Louis, in commemoration of the 75 years of the doctor's Nuremberg trial (following the Second World War). The trial consisted of 12 trials for war crimes of high-ranking German officials and industrialists, which took place from 9 December 1946 until 20 August 1947. Twenty of the twenty-three defendants were medical doctors. The symposium speakers dealt with war crimes, the performance of medical experiments, without the subjects' consent, on prisoners of war. Amongst the subjects discussed were the debilitating and cruel genital experiments, the Auschwitz concentration camp block 10 where men and women used as experimental subjects for Nazi doctors. Sterilization was experimented by the injection of a caustic substance into the cervix in order to obstruct the fallopian tubes, attempted X-ray sterilization of healthy men and women in their late teens or early twenties. Thereafter, the removal of the ovaries and testicles for examination. Demonstration of a short film of Alt Rehse village located in north - East Germany. During the Nazi era this was the site of an Institute of Genetics, run by Dr Hermann Boehm, and the Führerschule der Deutschen Ärzteschaft (Leadership School of German Medicine). At this school, doctors, nurses and midwives attended a six-week course, during which they studied Nazi racial ideology, genetics, "racial science" and eugenics. Dr Yves Ternon, a prolific author and historian, gave an account of aktion T4, a campaign of mass murder by involuntary euthanasia in Nazi Germany. He also gave arguments as to how the medical profession Nazified under the third Reich. The symposium also dealt with aspects of the Nuremberg Code and the set of ethical research principles for human experimentation, how these have evolved and adjustments needed as we go forward.

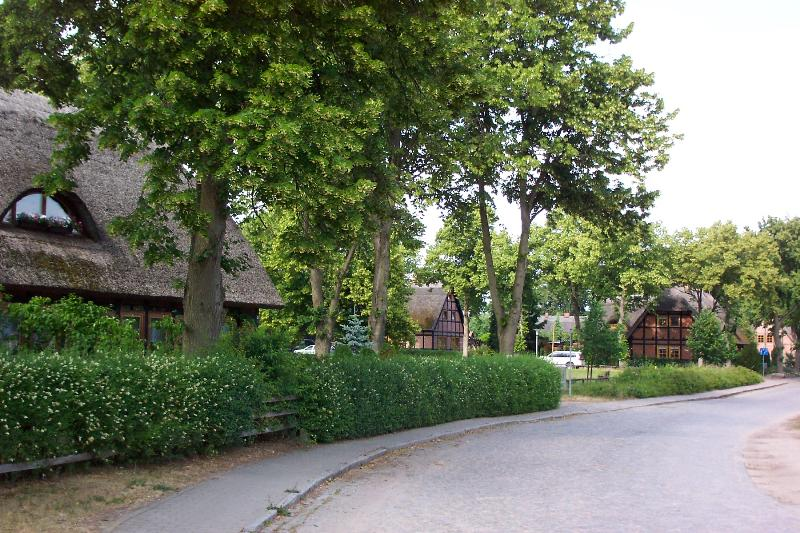
Alt Rhese

Dr. Yves Louis directed a documentary examining the roles of doctors and medical professors at Ghent University during World War II. The film, titled 'Doctors Between Hitler and Hippocrates, Between Ghent and Berlin', premiered on September 12th 2025 at Studio Skoop in Ghent. The documentary, with a script by Dr. Louis, production and editing by Thierry Bonnaffé, and editing by Claudine Leenknecht, explores how medical professionals in Belgium contributed to the implementation of Nazi ideology. The film looks at Belgian doctors and Nazi Germany, cooperation between Belgian doctors, especially in Ghent, and Germany and the Nazis, both between the wars and during the occupation. The influence of Pan-Germanism and Flemish nationalist politics (the “Flamenpolitik”) is addressed. The Jewish presence in Ghent, the local resistance, and the twentieth deportation transport from Mechelen are covered. The documentary also exposes links with the Katyn and Vinnytsia massacres and to the influence of the Conti family. Also covered are the Kaiser Wilhelm Institute for Anthropology in Berlin and the Nazi “Leadership School of German Physicians” in Alt-Rehse. These shaped the training of German doctors and midwives under National Socialism. The screening was organized by Groep Herinnering/Groupe Mémoire.

=== Political engagement ===
In 2007, Wynen, the second president of the GM-GH, filed a motion before the Senate endorsed by Senator Francis Delpérée stating that in order to be able to stand for democratic elections, all political parties and their candidates must openly declare that their programmes are in conformity with the Universal Declaration of Human Rights adopted on 10 December 1948 by the United Nations and that, should this be challenged, they are prepared to answer before the Belgian judicial system (Breendonk Declaration 2007).

In 2014 the Belgian interior minister Jan Jambon, member of the N-VA party, stated that in his view it was a mistake for the Belgians to collaborate with the German army occupier during the Second World War although these citizens had their reasons for so doing. The GM-GH disagreed with minister Jan Jambon's remarks concerning German collaboration in the Second World War in an article published in La Libre Belgique on 14 October 2014 stating that 'Mr Jambon ought not turn his back on history'.

== Parliamentary inquiries ==
=== The classification of the cellars of the Gestapo - Avenue Louise, Brussels ===
During the Second World War, after the invasion of Belgium, the German military occupied Brussels. The Gestapo, which was part of the Nazi security organisation, the Sicherheitspolizei-Sicherheitsdienst (Sipo-SD), set up their Brussels headquarters on Avenue Louise. On 9 January 2014 the Brussels government launched a procedure to classify the cellars of the buildings occupied by the Gestapo, during the Second World War, at 347 and 453 Avenue Louise in Brussels. The interested parties requesting to preserve this heritage site included Auschwitz Foundation President Henri Goldberg, Daniel Weyssow from the same Foundation and for the GM-GH, Roger de Taevernier and historian Claire Pahaut. The provisional classification obliged the owners to open their cellar to expert investigation by the "Commission royale des Monuments, Sites et Fouilles". Following the favorable report by the "Commission royale des Monuments, Sites et Fouilles" the cellars in the two buildings were officially classified on 14 January 2016.

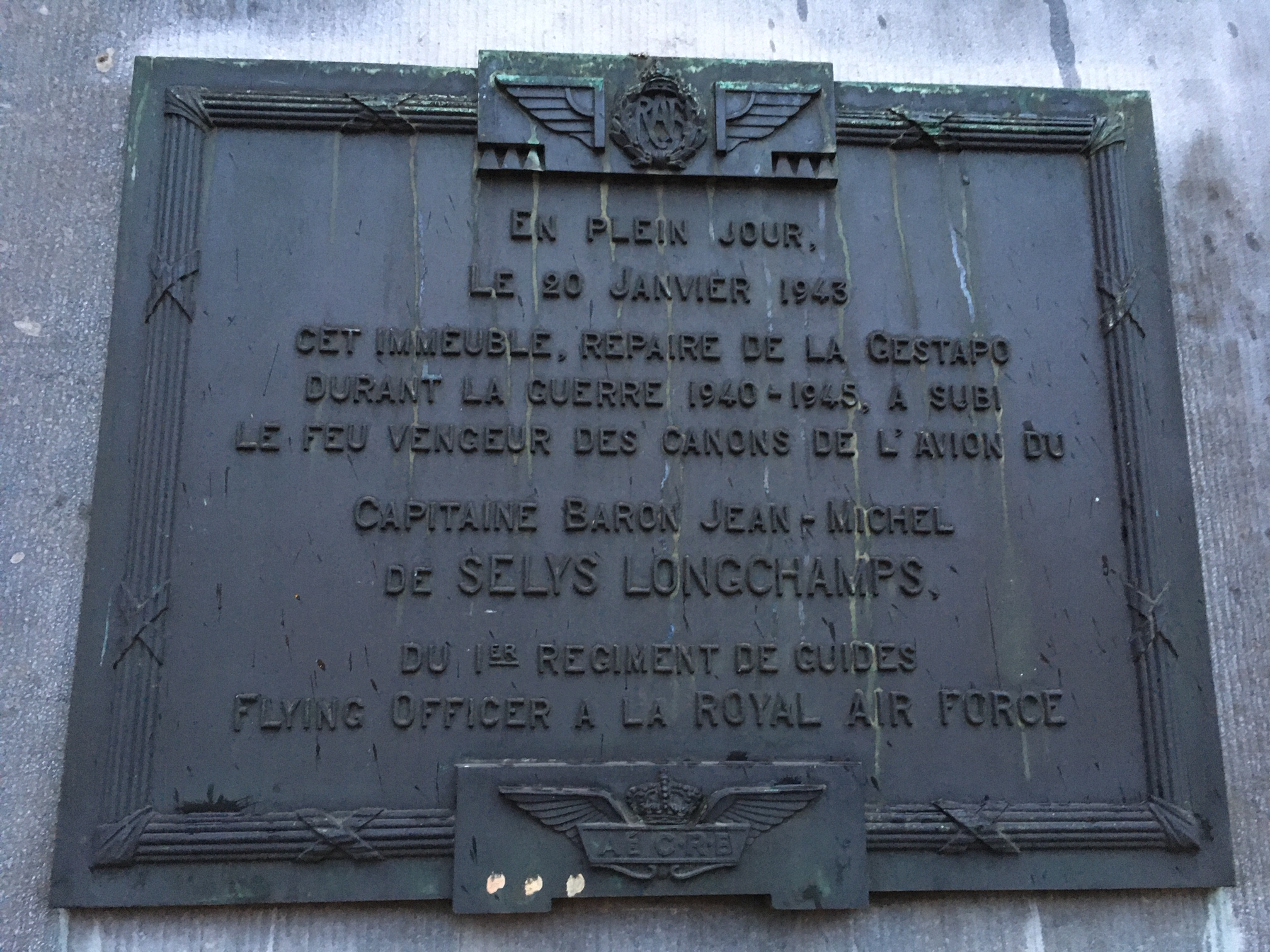
Memorial plaque for the Belgian RAF fighter pilot Baron Jean de Selys Longchamps at the house in Avenue Louise in Brussels where the Gestapo headquarter was located, which he attacked with his fighter aircraft on 20 January 1943

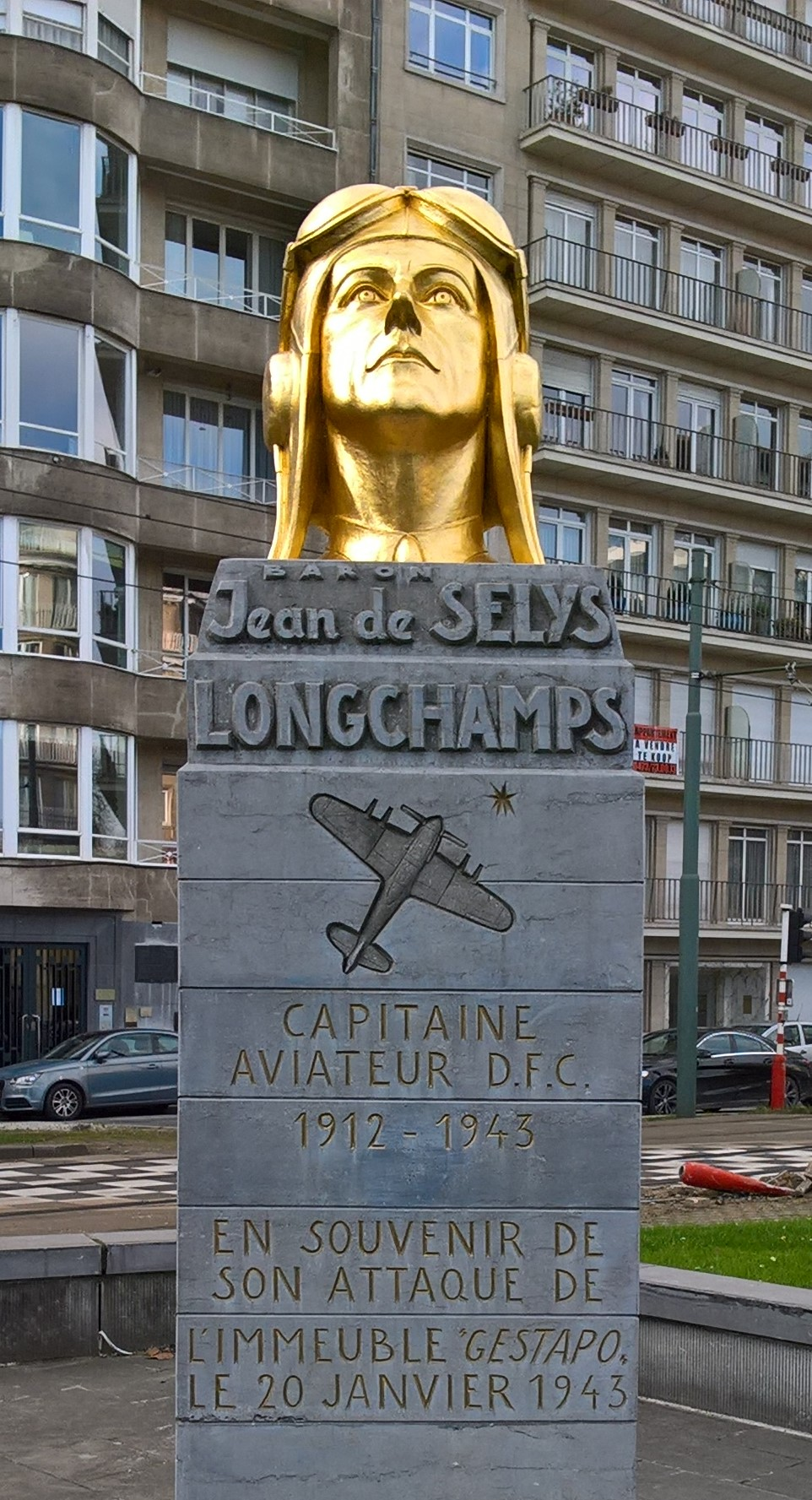
Memorial of the Belgian RAF fighter pilot Baron Jean de Selys Longchamps in front of the house in Avenue Louise in Brussels where the Gestapo headquarter was located, which he attacked on 20 January 1943

=== Controversial ongoing allocation of pensions to Belgian military collaborators of the Waffen-SS during the Second World War ===
Research indicates that a number of Belgians who joined the Waffen-SS during the Second World War received and continue to receive a pension from Germany. At the end of the Second World War, 57,000 Belgians were convicted for collaboration, 30,000 were Flemish and the other 27,000 were Walloons and from the Brussels region. The GM-GH played a pivotal role in lobbying the Belgian government to put an end to German pension payments. The GM-GH voiced concern that former Belgian collaborators were still receiving payments from Germany for their wartime activities. The German government for its part stated in 2012 that it could not confirm the exact number of Belgian ex-collaborators receiving German pensions. They did, however, confirm that 57 Belgians were receiving German BVG ("Bundesversorgungsgesetz") maintenance payments, with no explanation who those Belgians were. Following the work conducted by Alvin de Coninck (son of a resistance fighter) and the GM-GH, deputies from various political parties tabled a motion for a resolution seeking clarification of this issue. As of 2017, 27 people residing in Belgium were receiving this annuity from Germany. A working group will meet under the direction of a representative of the authors of the resolution to submit a proposal to the German authorities. The Belgian parliament's Foreign relations Committee passed a Resolution on 14 March 2019 calling on its government to ask Germany to stop providing this tax-free annuity, whilst emphasizing the injustice of these payments as victims of "Nazism" do not receive comparable allowances.

=== The Zedelgem Monument ===
In September 2018, the municipality of Zedelgem, located in the Belgian West Flanders region, erected a monument paying tribute to 12,000 Latvian soldiers of the Waffen-SS fighters of Nazi Germany, imprisoned in prisoner-of-war camps in Zedelgem during the Second World War. The unveiling of the monument was facilitated by the far-right municipal councilor from Vlaams Belang, Pol Denys. The discovery of the monument triggered strong opposition, disapproval and indignation from the GM-GH and other associations.

The Groupe Mémoire - Groep Herinnering set itself the task of coordinating the opposition to the existence of this monument with other association members, parliamentarians and historians. In late 2021, a group of historians convened to give advice on the monument. In their opinion, 'The Latvian Beehive for Freedom' was far too controversial. The municipal authorities believed the history behind the sculpture had turned out to be more complex than they originally believed. Following a "reflection process", they decided to follow the experts' recommendation to dismantle the sculpture, which occurred on May 31, 2022.

== Historical projects ==
=== Discovery of the Wolvertem Nazi Party Mütterheim ===
A GM-GH member discovered Nazi documents in the war archives in Paris referring to a Mütterheim (maternity hospital) in Wolvertem, Belgium. This German establishment in rural Wolvertem in Flemish Brabant situated north-west of Brussels was hitherto kept a secret. This Mütterheim was set up by the Germans as a branch of the Brussels Brugmann hospital, which the Germans used as a war hospital (Kriegslazarett). Formerly known as castle Levedale in Wolvertem, referred to also as Neromhof, was converted into a maternity hospital in August 1942. The first admissions were in November of the same year. The Mütterheim offered a good level of medical care for both mother and child. Spouses of SS officers benefited from the facilities offered by this maternity hospital.

The Mütterheim in Wolvertem was by strict definition not a Lebensborn clinic and therefore did not come under the jurisdiction of the SS. A genuine Lebensborn maternity was later established at Wégimont Castle near Liège, the Wolvertem clinic just serving as a stepping stone. Nanna Conti, the mother of the SS minister of public health (Reichsgesundheitsführer) Leonardo Conti, oversaw the Mütterheim in Wolvertem. She appointed a Norwegian Lebensborn as head midwife. Dr. Frans Daels, a gynecologist from Ghent University, and his assistant Adèle Vankerckhove, director of the nursing school in Ghent, saw to the appointment of Flemish midwives to the Mütterheim. The clinic was operational for a year before moving its activities to Wégimont castle, a genuine Lebensborn clinic. An estimated 20 to 30 children were born in Wolvertem.

== See also ==
- Belgium in World War II
