= Against the Tide =

Against the Tide may refer to:

- Against the Tide (1937 film), a British drama film
- Against the Tide (2023 film), a documentary film
- Against the Tide (TV series), a Singaporean TV series
- Against the Tide (EP), an EP by Mêlée
- Against the Tide (sculpture), a Dutch monument
