= Hermann Böhm =

Hermann Böhm or Boehm may refer to:

- Hermann Boehm (admiral) (1884–1972), German admiral
- Hermann Boehm (eugenicist) (1884–1962), German doctor and professor of 'Racial Hygiene' under Nazism
