= Honeyland =

2019 Macedonian documentary by Tamara Kotevska and Ljubomir Stefanov

- Theatrical release poster
- Directed by: Tamara Kotevska; Ljubomir Stefanov
- Produced by: Atanas Georgiev
- Starring: Hatidže Muratova
- Cinematography: Fejmi Daut; Samir Ljuma
- Edited by: Atanas Georgiev
- Music by: Foltin
- Production companies: Trice Films; Apolo Media
- Distributed by: Trice Films
- Release date: 28 January 2019 (Sundance)
- Running time: 87 minutes
- Country: North Macedonia
- Language: Balkan Turkish (Note: Other languages spoken in the film include Macedonian and Serbo-Croatian.)
- Box office: $1.3 million

Honeyland (Macedonian: Медена земја, romanized: Medena zemja) is a 2019 Macedonian documentary film that was directed by Tamara Kotevska and Ljubomir Stefanov. It portrays the life of Hatidže Muratova, a lonely beekeeper of wild bees who lives in the remote mountain village of Bekirlija and follows her lifestyle before and after neighbors move in nearby. The film was initially planned as a short film documenting the region surrounding the river Bregalnica but its area of focus changed when the directors met Hatidže. Honeyland received its world premiere at the 2019 Sundance Film Festival on 28 January and it has grossed $1,315,037.

Filming of Honeyland lasted three years, and 400 hours of footage were filmed. Several environmental topics are explored, such as climate change, biodiversity loss, and exploitation of natural resources. The directors primarily focused on the visual aspects and wanted to portray humanity's balance with the ecosystem through Hatidže, and consumerism and resource depletion through her neighbors. The documentary also portrays Hatidže's relationships with her bedridden mother and her neighbors. Honeyland contains elements of several documentary styles, including fly on the wall, direct cinema, and cinéma vérité.

Honeyland received universal critical acclaim from film critics, who praised its attention to detail and applauded its conservationist message. The documentary received numerous awards and nominations at film festivals, including three awards at the 2019 Sundance Film Festival and two nominations at the 92nd Academy Awards in the categories for Best International Feature Film and Best Documentary Feature. Honeyland is the first documentary to receive a nomination in both categories in the history of the Oscars.

== Plot ==
Honeyland documents the life of Hatidže Muratova, a Macedonian beekeeper of Turkish descent, who lives in the village of Bekirlija in the municipality of Lozovo. She is one of the last keepers of wild bees in Europe. Due to its location in a secluded mountain, the village has no access to electricity and running water. Hatidže lives with her 85-year-old, partly blind and bedridden mother Nazife, who is completely dependent on her daughter. Hatidže earns a living by selling honey in the country's capital Skopje, which is four hours away from the village.

The atmosphere in the village changes when the nomadic rancher Hussein Sam arrives with his wife Ljutvie, their seven children, and their imported domestic animals. Initially, Hatidže maintains good relationships with the family and spends time playing with the children. In need of money, and inspired by Hatidže's way of earning money, Sam takes an interest in wild beekeeping himself. Hatidže instructs him on collecting honey and provides him with several bees so Sam can start his own colony. Despite his initial success, one of Sam's customers demands more honey than his bees can produce. Sam disregards Hatidže's advice to always leave half of the honey for his bees and proceeds to sell the entire stock of honey. This leads to Sam's colonies attacking Hatidže's during the resource-scarce winter. Hatidže scolds Sam for ignoring her advice and her bee colony collapses. Soon after, her mother dies. As the nomadic family decides to move to another village, Hatidže remains alone in Bekirlija.

== Conception and development ==
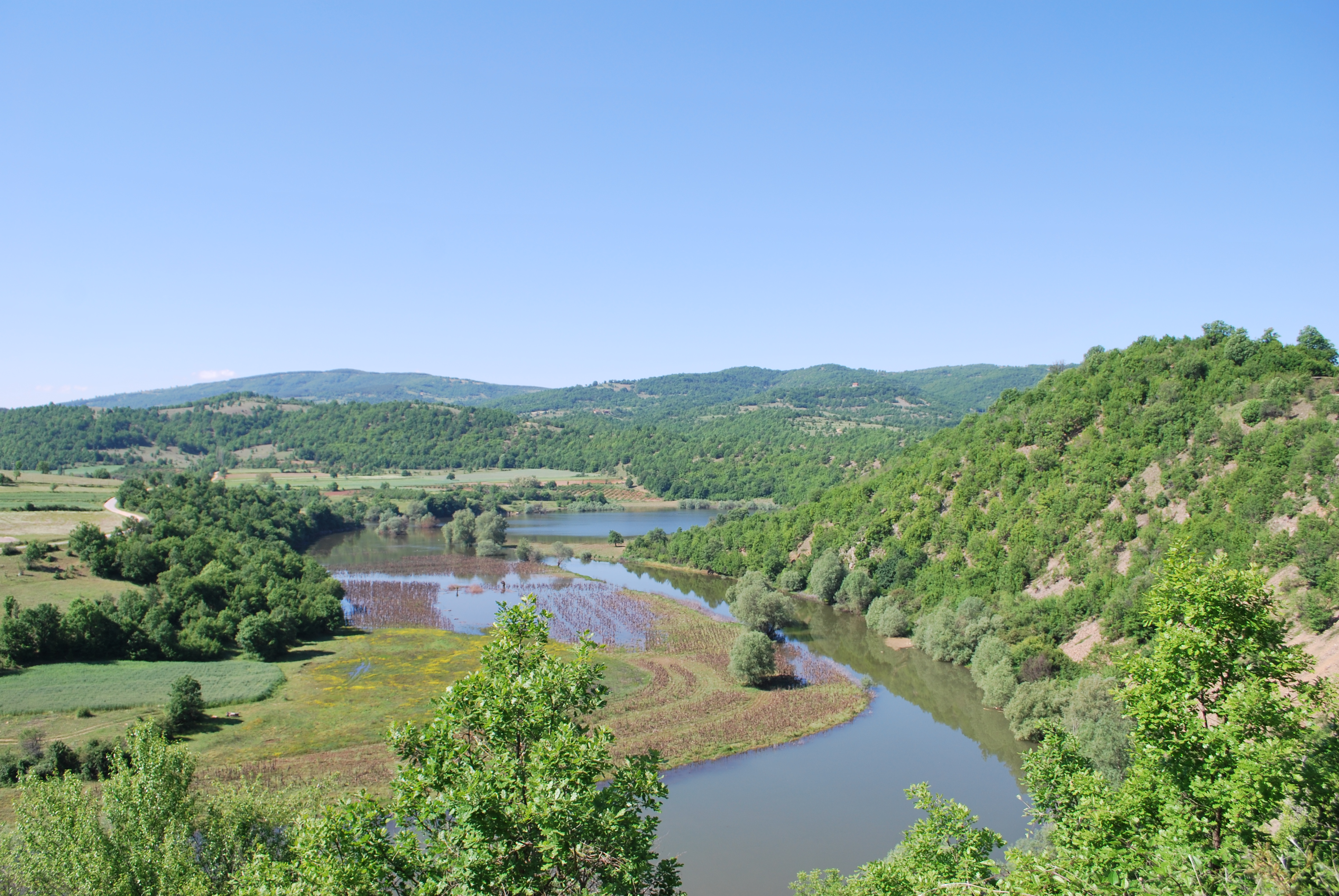
The film was originally planned as a documentary short about preserving the region surrounding river Bregalnica (pictured).

Honeyland is Tamara Kotevska's and Ljubomir Stefanov's second collaboration on a documentary movie after Lake of Apples (2017). The movie was originally intended as a government-funded documentary short focusing on the Bregalnica river and the preservation of the surrounding region in Lozovo municipality, central North Macedonia. The project was also part of the Swiss Agency for Development and Cooperation's program for preservation of North Macedonia's natural resources. Finance came from a $25,000 grant awarded by San Francisco International Film Festival's documentary fund and three million Macedonian denars awarded by North Macedonia Film Agency.

Initially, the directors were planning to focus on the rotational farming practices of villagers inhabiting the area around Bregalnica. They also planned to follow the natural change of the river's flow that takes place every ten years. Upon arriving at the location, the film crew was introduced to Hatidže. Although initially reluctant to participate in the documentary, Hatidže agreed to get involved to send a message of sustainable living to the world. The film was going to focus on Hatidže's relationship with her mother and the directors had no conflict planned until the nomad family arrived sometime later. Hatidže and the nomad family were camera-shy at first but became used to the process as filming progressed. According to Kotevska, virtually none of the film's scenes are inauthentic – the only part that had to be recreated was the Sams' arrival in the village, which the filmmakers had missed during their first year of filming.

== Filming and production ==
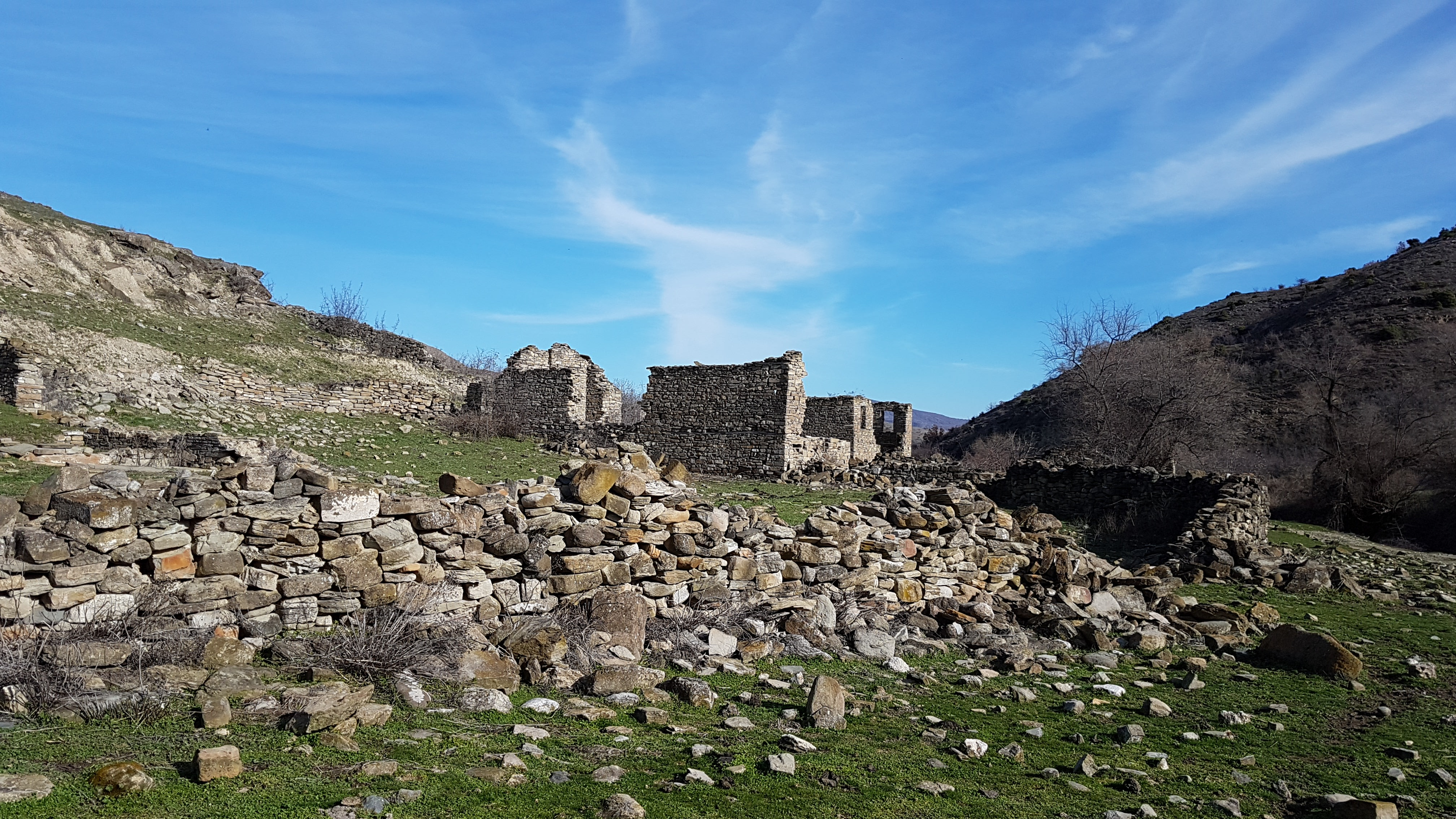
An image of the village Bekirlija in the central region of North Macedonia where filming took place

Starting in 2015, the documentary was filmed over three years and the final version was condensed from more than 400 hours of footage. Due to the remoteness of Bekirlija, the production team stayed there for three-to-four consecutive days before going to nearby towns for supplies and to recharge their filming equipment. They slept in tents and hammocks in front of Hatidže's house. The production involved a crew of six: the two directors, two directors of photography, an editor, and a sound engineer. They spent the better course of three years visiting the families of the film. Fejmi Daut, one of the documentary's cinematographers, said the lack of electricity in the village meant the production crew relied on daylight, candles, gaslight and a fireplace to achieve desired image quality. Each of the directors focused on a different element of the narrative; Kotevska's main role was the portrayal of relationships while Stefanov captured the environmental aspects.

The documentary uses fly on the wall style; it does not use any voice-overs and subjects filmed do not look directly at the camera, which gives it an "invisible" quality. According to Kotevska and Stefanov, during filming they mainly relied on visual observations of their subjects, whose language they did not understand. This approach was followed during the post-production stages and the first six months of the rough cut, which together lasted approximately 12 months. The directors focused only on the visuals without making use of audio recordings or transcripts. According to Kotevska, they wanted to make sure the movie's narrative is completely understandable even if it is followed visually. The filming technique has elements of direct cinema and cinéma vérité. The camerawork, which is steady during the first half of the movie, later becomes less steady with the arrival of the nomadic neighbors.

The film's score was composed and performed by the Macedonian band Foltin under the musical supervision of Rana Eid from the production company DB Studios in Beirut, Lebanon. The directors decided to collaborate with Foltin on the movie's score because they deemed Foltin original and capable of creating music specifically tailored for the documentary.

After the film, the filmmakers bought Hatidže a house close to her brother's family, although she still spends bee season in her old village. They also set up a donation page supporting Sams' children on the film's website.

== Themes ==
According to Stefanov, the directors' main focuses in Honeyland were climate change, biodiversity loss exemplified by the decline of the bee population, and the use of natural resources. Stefanov said, "The point is to take as much as you need, not to take everything, and leave [something] for tomorrow and those who are providing for you". Kotevska said the most suitable description of the documentary's main theme is modern consumerism. She described Hatidže's case as a portrayal of "how consumerism destroys ... natural resources completely". She elaborated that Sam's initial hesitation to sell more honey than he could produce comes from the conflict between his moral values and "the pressures of society". Josh Kupecki from the Austin Chronicle said Honeyland successfully depicts the way "capitalism functions even in the most rural areas". Sheena Scott, writing for Forbes, said Sam's actions were motivated by profit "to the detriment of a more suitable sustainable way of living".

Set in the context of global warming and the rise of contemporary environmental awareness, numerous critics emphasized the message of sustainability. A.O. Scott from The New York Times viewed Hatidže as a "heroic figure" who sends a message to her "wasteful, wanton neighbors". Michael O'Sullivan from The Washington Post also found a prominent, cautionary message about the consequences of disrupting the universe's equilibrium. David Fear writing for Rolling Stone viewed it as a documentary that portrays "rural regionalism and lost art forms", also saying the directors ensured viewers are immersed in Hatidže's way of living during the first half of the movie so they realize what is being lost during the latter half. The documentary's producer Atanas Georgiev said the production team was "very eager" to send the message of sustainability to the citizens and the government of North Macedonia, and to prompt action to improve the country's air quality and reduce pollution.

In an interview, Hatidže said she views her work as a means of restoring the ecosystem's balance. This is exemplified when she chants "half for me, half for you" to her bees when collecting honey. This principle is based on the customs and traditions of her grandfather, who taught her bees need to use their own honey to obtain enough energy to fly and mate. The documentary includes numerous scenes of Hatidže and her neighbors during the beekeeping process, including the handling of the apiaries where the bees are kept, the cutting of honeycombs and the collection of honey in jars.

Critics have viewed it as a film that also explores anthropological topics. Another theme covered in the movie is the mother–daughter relationship between Hatidže and her bedridden mother, which cinematographer Ljuma and Kotevska described as resembling that between a queen bee and a worker bee. The finished film includes six of the twenty-five scenes portraying the relationship between the two. Kotevska and Stefanov stated they tried to reflect the traditions of the region, according to which the last daughter has to take care of her parents until they die, prohibiting the daughter from marrying and establishing her own family.

== Release ==
The world premiere of Honeyland took place at the 2019 Sundance Film Festival on 28 January 2019. Its distributor Neon gave it a theatrical release in the United States, opening on 26 July 2019. In North Macedonia, the film had its premiere at the MakeDox Festival in Kuršumli An on 28 August 2019, which was attended by the film crew and Hatidže, and included a concert by Foltin. In the United Kingdom, Honeyland was released by Dogwoof on 13 September 2019, which was followed by a wider release in most European countries the same month. In Australia and New Zealand, Honeyland was released by the production company Umbrella Films on 5 March 2020. As of July 2021, Honeyland has grossed $815,082 in the US and Canada, and $499,955 in other territories, making a worldwide gross of $1,315,037.

== Reception ==
=== Critical response ===
On the review aggregator website Rotten Tomatoes, Honeyland has an approval rating of 100% based on 135 reviews, and an average rating of 8.4/10. According to the website's critical consensus, "Honeyland uses life in a remote village to offer an eye-opening perspective on experiences that should resonate even for audiences halfway around the world". At Metacritic, which assigns a rating out of 100 to reviews from mainstream publications, the film received an average score of 85 based on 27 reviews, indicating "universal acclaim". A.O. Scott from The New York Times praised the directors for "render[ing] the thick complexity of experience with poignant clarity" and called the film "quiet, intimate and intense, but touched with a breath of epic grandeur. It's a poem including history" and listed the film as best pick for 2019. In a separate year-end review, Scott and Manohla Dargis of the same newspaper named Honeyland the best film of 2019, and called it "nothing less than a found epic". Bob Verini of Variety deemed it a "rare film that would be a strong contender in either [Academy Awards] category, in any year" due to its "strong geopolitical resonance and visual splendor". Guy Lodge, another Variety journalist, wrote in a positive review that in the "painstaking observational documentary, everything from the honey upwards is organic".

Grading Honeyland with four stars out of five, Ty Burr from The Boston Globe said the film's strongest point is that it serves as "both allegory and example, a symbolic tale about the importance of nature's balance and a specific story about these specific lives", and called Hatidže "a figure for the ages". Los Angeles Times journalist Justin Chang described it as one of the rare films that serve as an "intimately infuriating, methodically detailed allegory of the earth's wonders being ravaged by the consequences of human greed". The New Yorker's Anthony Lane identified numerous topics covered in the movie, writing that it "swarms with difficult, ancient truths about parents, children, greed, respect, and the need for husbandry". Writing for The Hollywood Reporter, Sheri Linden called it an "unforgettable vérité character study and an intimate look at an endangered tradition". Ed Potton of The Times, who gave the film four stars out of five, said "[a]lthough it starts as a meditation on the hardship and rhythms of rural life, [the film] becomes something more intimate". Rating it with four stars out of five, Helen O'Hara of Empire magazine, summed up the film as "[s]tunningly beautiful and quietly powerful, this is a portrait of a vanishing way of life and of a determined woman who's just trying to make her way in the world".

David Sims of The Atlantic called Honeyland "a rare nature documentary that's deeply personal". He elaborated, "a sensitivity to both petty human concerns and striking natural beauty is what makes Honeyland a particularly enthralling documentary. Nature filmmaking that focuses only on the environment can feel a little dry, while so-called human-interest storytelling can be cloying; Honeyland succeeds by combining the two." Sheena Scott from Forbes shared Sims's sentiments, writing that "it is the moments of intimacy that make this film so unique and beautiful". Austin Chronicle's Josh Kupecki said the documentary is ultimately a "broader impact of humanity (in all its messy glory), and a document of so many things: grief, loss, happiness, and joy". Rating it with three stars out of four, Michael O'Sullivan from The Washington Post said despite the worthwhile patience it requires from viewers, the film "sneaks up on you in a quiet yet powerful way". David Ehlrich writing for IndieWire gave the film a B+ in his review, calling it "a bitter and mesmerically beautiful documentary that focuses on a single beekeeper as though our collective future hinges on the fragile relationship between her and the hives". One mixed review came from Stephen Whitty writing for Screen Daily, who praised the painstaking filming and imagery but said its "commercial future seems limited" and that it "leaves plenty of questions – and, occasionally, its audience – behind".

Dina Iordanova, an academic of world cinema at the University of St. Andrews criticized the directors' claim that the movie was not scripted or re-enacted and questioned the authenticity of the documentary in her review published in Docalogue. She stated that the movie was too fictionalized to be regarded as a documentary and claimed it was "a bona fide Flahertian re-enacted documentary. One can also call it "fake." She also criticized the alleged romanticization and exploitation of the austere conditions of Hatidže’s circumstance for the political message on sustainability, defining it a "morality tale about environmentalism and sustainability that borders on preaching.".

Honeyland was ranked as the third-best documentary and twelfth-best foreign film of 2019 in a survey of over 300 critics around the world conducted by IndieWire. On Metacritic, it was ranked as the twenty-fourth-best film of 2019. It also appeared on twenty-three critics' year-end top-ten lists, ranking first in three of them.

=== Accolades ===
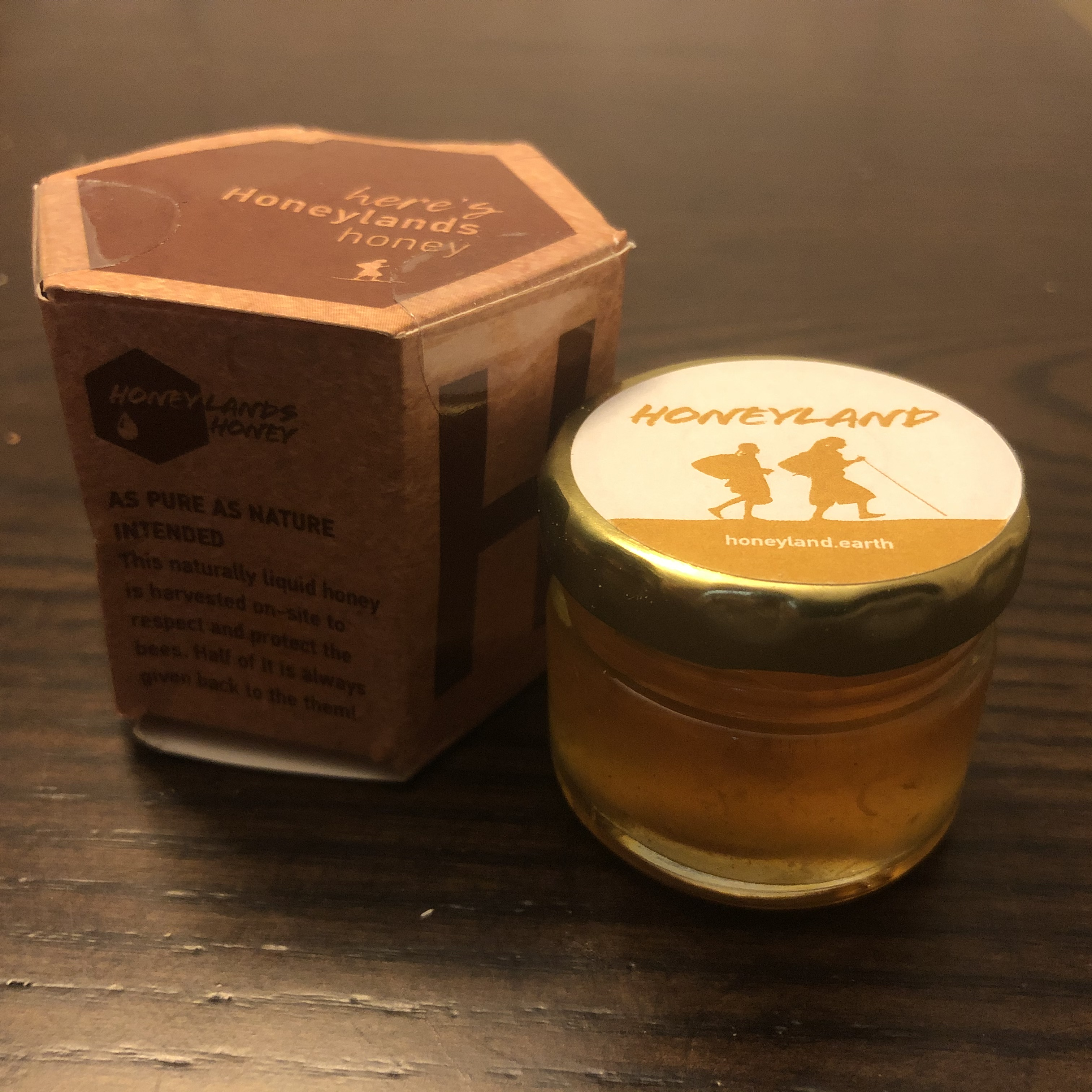
A jar of Honeyland honey from the Donate for the Honeyland Community fundraising campaign

Honeyland received its first monetary award prize of €30,000 from the Turkish Radio and Television Corporation at the 2019 Sarajevo Film Festival in late August 2019. Money received from the award was used to purchase a new house for Hatidže in the nearby village of Dorfulija in Lozovo Municipality, close to her relatives and friends. Kotevska and Stefanov also started a campaign titled Donate for the Honeyland Community that sends jars of natural honey to donors of a fund that benefits Hatidže and her neighbors.

Honeyland was the most awarded movie at the 2019 Sundance Movie Festival, winning awards in three categories, including the Grand Jury Prize, the Special Jury Award for Impact for Change, and the Special Jury Award for Cinematography, all in the World Cinema Documentary Competition category. In February 2020, the documentary won an award in the category of Best International Success at the 23rd Golden Ladybug of Popularity Awards in North Macedonia. Hatidže attended the event and performed two songs after receiving the award.

On 13 January 2020, Honeyland received nominations in the categories for Best Documentary Feature and Best International Feature Film at the 92nd Academy Awards; it was the first documentary in the history of the Oscars to receive a nomination in the both categories. It is also the second Macedonian film to earn an Oscar nomination after Before the Rain (1994). Matilda Coleman of The New York Times dubbed the movie an "Oscar game changer" and stated with its two nominations, it paved the way for more success of the documentary genre in future Academy Award nominations. Jake Coyle writing for the Associated Press deemed the documentary a "quietly revolutionary Oscar nominee" and said it "speaks to ... the increasingly boundless nature of [the] documentary [genre]". Following the movie's dual nomination, several other countries started submitting their documentaries for dual categories at the 2021 Oscar awards.

Award	Category	Recipient	Result	Ref.
Academy Awards	Best Documentary Feature	Ljubomir Stefanov, Tamara Kotevska, Atanas Georgiev	Nominated	
Academy Awards	Best International Feature Film	North Macedonia	Nominated	
Alliance of Women Film Journalists	Best Documentary Feature Film	Honeyland	Nominated	
American Society of Cinematographers Awards	Outstanding Achievement in Cinematography in Documentary	Fejmi Daut & Samir Ljuma	Won	
Boston Society of Film Critics	Best Documentary Film	Honeyland	Won	
Chicago Film Critics Association	Best Documentary	Honeyland	Nominated	
Cinema Eye Honors Awards	Outstanding Achievement in Cinematography	Fejmi Daut & Samir Ljuma	Won	
Cinema Eye Honors Awards	The Unforgettables	Hatidže Muratova	Won	
Cinema Eye Honors Awards	Outstanding Achievement in Direction	Tamara Kotevska & Ljubomir Stefanov	Nominated	
Cinema Eye Honors Awards	Outstanding Achievement in Nonfiction Feature Filmmaking	Atanas Georgiev & Tamara Kotevska & Ljubomir Stefanov	Nominated	
Dallas–Fort Worth Film Critics Association	Best Documentary Film	Honeyland	Nominated	
Directors Guild of America Awards	Outstanding Directing – Documentaries	Ljubomir Stefanov & Tamara Kotevska	Nominated	
Docaviv Film Festival	Best International Film	Honeyland	Won	
European Film Awards	European Film Award for Best Documentary	Honeyland	Nominated	
EBS International Documentary Festival	Grand Prix	Honeyland	Won	
Florida Film Critics Circle	Best Documentary Film	Honeyland	Nominated	
Independent Spirit Awards	Best Documentary Feature	Honeyland	Nominated	
International Documentary Association Awards	Best Cinematography	Fejmi Daut & Samir Ljuma	Won	
International Documentary Association Awards	Pare Lorentz Award	Tamara Kotevska & Ljubomir Stefanov & Atanas Georgiev	Won	
International Documentary Association Awards	Best Director	Tamara Kotevska & Ljubomir Stefanov	Nominated	
International Documentary Association Awards	Best Feature	Tamara Kotevska & Ljubomir Stefanov & Atanas Georgiev	Nominated	
Jio MAMI Mumbai Film Festival	International Competition	Honeyland	Won	
National Society of Film Critics Awards	Best Non-Fiction Film	Honeyland	Won	
New York Film Critics Circle Awards	Best Non-Fiction Film	Honeyland	Won	
Millennium Docs Against Gravity	Grand Prix Bank Millennium Award	Honeyland	Won	
Online Film Critics Society	Best Documentary Film	Honeyland	Nominated	
Producers Guild of America Awards	Best Documentary Motion Picture	Honeyland	Nominated	
Satellite Awards	Best Documentary Film	Honeyland	Nominated	
Seattle Film Critics Society	Best Documentary	Honeyland	Nominated	
St. Louis Film Critics Association	Best Documentary Feature	Honeyland	Nominated	
Sundance Film Festival	World Cinema Grand Jury Prize: Documentary	Honeyland	Won	
Sundance Film Festival	World Cinema Documentary Special Jury Award for Impact for Change	Honeyland	Won	
Sundance Film Festival	World Cinema Documentary Special Jury Award for Cinematography	Honeyland	Won	
Vancouver Film Critics Circle	Best Documentary	Honeyland	Nominated	
Washington D.C. Area Film Critics Association	Best Documentary	Honeyland	Nominated	

== See also ==
- List of submissions to the 92nd Academy Awards for Best International Feature Film
- List of Macedonian submissions for the Academy Award for Best International Feature Film
- List of films with a 100% rating on Rotten Tomatoes
- Macedonian bee
- Cinema of North Macedonia
- Environmental issues in North Macedonia
- Hive (film)
