= Friedrich Ruttner =

Austrian physician (1914–1998)

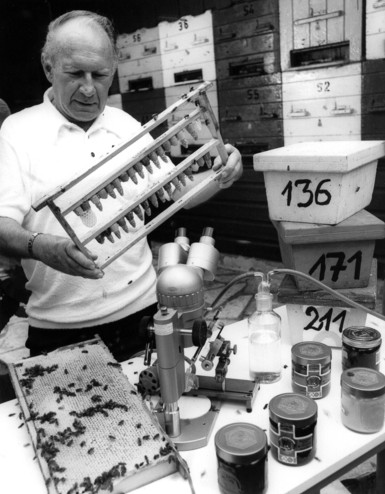
Friedrich Ruttner

Friedrich Ruttner (15 May 1914 – 3 February 1998) was an Austrian SA-member, NSDAP member, SS-physician, neurologist, zoologist and bee expert. He became internationally known for his advances in honey bee breeding, instrumental insemination, classification of various subspecies and as a co-founder of Apidologie.

== Biography ==
Ruttner was born in Eger, Bohemia as the son of a Limnologist, Franz Ruttner. He studied medicine at the University of Vienna, although in 1936 he was temporarily excluded from his studies because of illegal activities for National Socialism (Austria was not annexed by the Third Reich until 1939). He received his doctorate in 1938. From 1939 he was a member of the Erbbiologische Forschungsinstitut (Genetic / Hereditary Biology Research Institute) working under the eugenicist Hermann Boehm a Professor of Racial Hygiene at the Führerschule der Deutschen Ärzteschaft (Leadership School of the German Medical Association) in Alt Rehse, under whose mentorship he would have been taught the genetics of "hereditary biology and racial hygiene" in the context of Nazism and Racial Hierarchy. Membership of the School was restricted to Nazi party members that showed "political reliability", education was focused not on medical training but on ideological training in line with the racial policy of Nazi Germany with a view to achieving racial purity. As a former member of the NSDAP (Nazi Party), membership number 6360728, before and after the Anschluss, the SA (Brownshirts) and the SS, he was dismissed from university service in 1945 by order of the Allies, due to their policy of denazification.

The following year, together with his brother Hans he founded the Institute for Bee Science in Lunz am See in 1946, which soon became part of the Ministry of Agriculture. In 1948 he demonstrated the first proof of the multiple mating of the queen bee during the mating flight. During this time he studied zoology at the University of Vienna. Ruttner became Professor of zoology at the Department of Biology in 1965. Until his retirement in 1981, he also headed the Institute for Bee Science in Oberursel. This institute discovered the first Varroa mites in Germany in 1976. Ruttner cultivated intensive research contacts with scientists and beekeepers from all over the world. Together with his French colleague Jean Louveaux, Ruttner founded the specialist journal Apidologie in 1970, today one of the most important bee science journals. Ruttner's breeding approaches and the introduction of instrumental insemination of the queen had a lasting influence on beekeeping.

Ruttner wrote, among other works, the Natural History of Honeybees He further developed the method of morphometry in order to distinguish between different subspecies of Apis mellifera. Their physical characteristics overlap to such an extent that they can only be distinguished by synchronous measurement and comparison of numerous metrics. In particular, measuring points on the wings and the angles between wing loaders are measured and offset against each other according to certain regulations. However, the morphometric differentiation of the subspecies is difficult and the assignment of many regional forms depends on the exact measuring method.

Ruttner died in 1998 in Lunz am See.
