= Film and Television Institute of India =

Film school in Pune, India

- Type: Film school (Deemed to be University)
- Established: 1960; 66 years ago
- Affiliations: CILECT
- Chancellor: Union Minister of Information and Broadcasting
- Vice-Chancellor: Dhiraj Singh
- President: R. Madhavan
- Location: Pune, Maharashtra, India
- Website: ftii.ac.in

The Film and Television Institute of India (FTII) is a film institute under the Ministry of Information and Broadcasting of the Government of India and aided by the Central Government of India. It is situated on the premises of the erstwhile Prabhat Film Company in Pune. It was established in 1960 and its alumni includes technicians, actors and directors in the film and television industry.

FTII is a member of the International Liaison Centre of Schools of Cinema and Television (CILECT), an organisation of the world's leading schools of film and television.

The centre will set up a new institute in Arunachal Pradesh as part of an initiative to tap the potential of the North-Eastern region, informed by Jitendra Singh Rana, former Union Minister of State for Development of North Eastern Region.

FTII also sponsors a film award show named Global Indie Film Awards Festival or GIFA Festival.

== History ==
The institute was established as the Film Institute of India in Pune in 1960 by the Ministry of Information and Broadcasting on the recommendation of the Film Enquiry Committee. The committee, headed by SK Patil, a cabinet minister in the central government, and comprising prominent film industry figures like BN Sircar and V. Shantaram, recommended the creation of a film school. Courses began in 1961 on the premises of the erstwhile Prabhat Film Company in Pune.Film director, screenwriter, and actor Gajanan Jagirdar served as the first director (then principal) of the institute from 1961 to 1962. In 1967, the institute launched its first film appreciation course, a one-month residential program with Satish Bahadur as course director and Marie Seton as the main instructor. In 1971, the institute was renamed the 'Film and Television Institute of India' (FTII) with the addition of in-service training programs for Doordarshan, India's public service broadcaster. The Television Training wing, which was earlier functioning in New Delhi, shifted to Pune in 1974. Thereafter, the institute became fully aided by the Ministry of Information and Broadcasting. In July 2011, Information and Broadcasting Minister Ambika Soni said that a bill in Parliament to develop the FTII into a 'Centre of Excellence' would be introduced. This would enable the institute to enjoy the academic status and privileges of a university.

In February 2015, Gajendra Chauhan was appointed as the chairman of the institute, which sparked protests by students at the institute.

On 18 August 2015, police — in a night-time crackdown — arrested striking students who confined FTII director Prashant Pathrabe and other staffers in his office for eight hours. The director claimed that students harassed and mentally tortured him. The students were released on bail. A video showing students surrounding the director and shouting was released by the management. In response, the students released an undated video of cops manhandling students and breaking glass in the director's office. The striking students vehemently condemned the act by the Pune police to come and arrest students past midnight.

In 2017, FTII set up its Center for Open Learning (CFOL) with the objective of making quality cinema education accessible to a broader range of people.

== Management ==
The FTII is registered under Societies' Registration Act of 1860. The Society is headed by a president, who also functions as the chairman of the Governing Council, the Academic Council and the Standing Finance Committee. The Governing Council is constituted by election from among the members of the Society. The Governing Council is the apex body of the FTII and is responsible for making all major policy decisions of the institute. The council, in turn, appoints the Academic Council and the Standing Finance Committee, members of both of which are responsible for advising the FTII in policy matters related to academic affairs and financial matters.

A director serves as the institute's executive head and implements its policies and programmes. Prashant Pathrabe, a 1992 batch officer of Indian Information Service (IIS), has been given temporary charge as director following end of the term of DJ Narain. Gajendra Chauhan, the designated chairman of the governing council, is yet to join, owing to protest overs his appointment. The protests have been continuing for over 95 days but the logjam over appointment still remains.

== List of presidents ==
No.	Name	Portrait	Term of office	Refs
1	Roshan Taneja			
2	Anwar Jamal Kidwai		1 November 1974 – 30 September 1977	
3	S. M. H. Burney		25 November 1975 – 30 September 1977	
4	R. K. Laxman		1 November 1977 – 30 September 1980	
5	Shyam Benegal		5 February 1981 – 30 September 1983	
6	Mrinal Sen		9 April 1984 – 30 September 1986	
7	Adoor Gopalakrishnan		1 September 1987 – September 1989	
(5)	Shyam Benegal		September 1989 – 30 September 1992	
(7)	Adoor Gopalakrishnan		21 November 1992 – 30 September 1995	
8	Mahesh Bhatt		20 November 1995 – 30 September 1998	
9	Girish Karnad		16 February 1999 – 10 October 2001	
10	Vinod Khanna		12 October 2001 – February 2002 4 March 2002 – 3 March 2005	
11	U. R. Ananthamurthy		4 March 2005 – 3 March 2011	
12	Saeed Akhtar Mirza		4 March 2011 – 3 March 2014	
13	Gajendra Chauhan		9 June 2015 – 11 October 2017	
14	Anupam Kher		11 October 2017 – 31 October 2018	
15	B. P. Singh		13 December 2018 – 29 September 2020	
16	Shekhar Kapur		30 September 2020 – 1 September 2023	
17	R. Madhavan		1 September 2023 – Incumbent	

== Notable faculty members ==
- David Lean
- Gajanan Jagirdar
- István Gaál
- Mani Kaul
- Ritwik Ghatak
- Roshan Taneja
- Satyajit Ray
- Satish Bahadur
- Tom Alter
- Ramachandra Babu
- Michel Wyn
- Asrani

== Notable alumni ==
- Adoor Gopalakrishnan
- Daman Sood
- Jaya Bachchan
- Shatrughan Sinha
- Vijay Arora
- Raza Murad
- Asrani
- Kanwarjit Paintal
- Danny Denzongpa
- Kumar Shahani
- Mani Kaul
- Rakesh Bedi
- Rakesh Pandey
- Rakesh Ranjan
- Sanjay Leela Bhansali
- Satish Kaushik
- Tom Alter
- K.G.George
- John Abraham (director)
- Vimukthi Jayasundara
- Anupama Srinivasan
- Mithun Chakraborty
- Talluri Rameswari
- Zarina Wahab
- Navroze Contractor
- Girish Kasaravalli
- Naseeruddin Shah
- Mukesh Khanna
- Nimisha Pandey
- P. Kumar Vasudev
- Rajkummar Rao
- Parvathy Thiruvothu
- Gaurav Dwivedi
- Aruna Raje
- Om Puri
- K. U. Mohanan
- Prakash Kutty
- Anurag Sinha
- Gaurav Chakrabarty
- Vijay Verma
- Nipon Goswami
- Jaideep Ahlawat
- Jahnu Barua
- Shabana Azmi
- Sunny Hinduja
- Umesh Vinayak Kulkarni
- Anupam Kher
- Balu Mahendra
- Ranjan Palit
- Anuya Y Bhagwat
- Rasika Dugal
- Triptii Dimri
- Rajat Kapoor
- Sriram Raghavan
- Divyenndu
- Rajkumar Hirani
- Payal Kapadia
- Shakti Kapoor
- Gyan Sahay
- Resul Pookutty
- Jameela Malik
- Sukhdev Singh Sandhu
- Anil Dhawan
- Aakash Kaushik

== Wisdom Tree ==
Wisdom Tree at FTII is an informal masterclass where students discuss topics with Filmmakers. Poet, lyricist and writer G.D. Madgulkar is believed to have given this natural structure the name "Wisdom Tree."
