= 2019 New York Film Critics Circle Awards =

85th New York Film Critics Circle Awards

85th NYFCC Awards
- Date: December 4, 2019

Highlights
- Best Picture: The Irishman
- Best Director: Josh and Benny Safdie
- Website: http://www.nyfcc.com/awards/

The 85th New York Film Critics Circle Awards, honoring the best in film for 2019, were announced on December 4, 2019.

== Winners ==
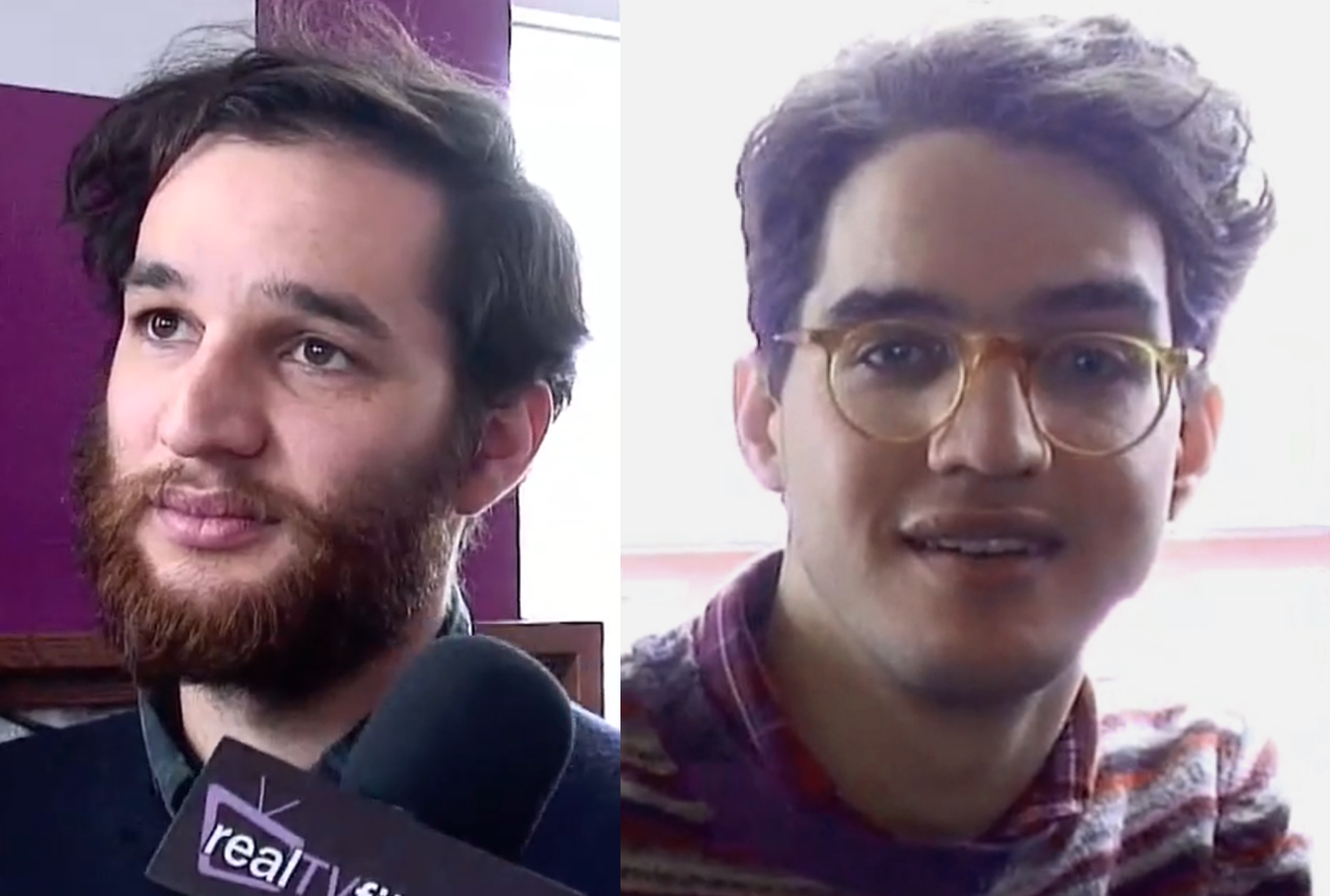
Josh and Benny Safdie won Best Director

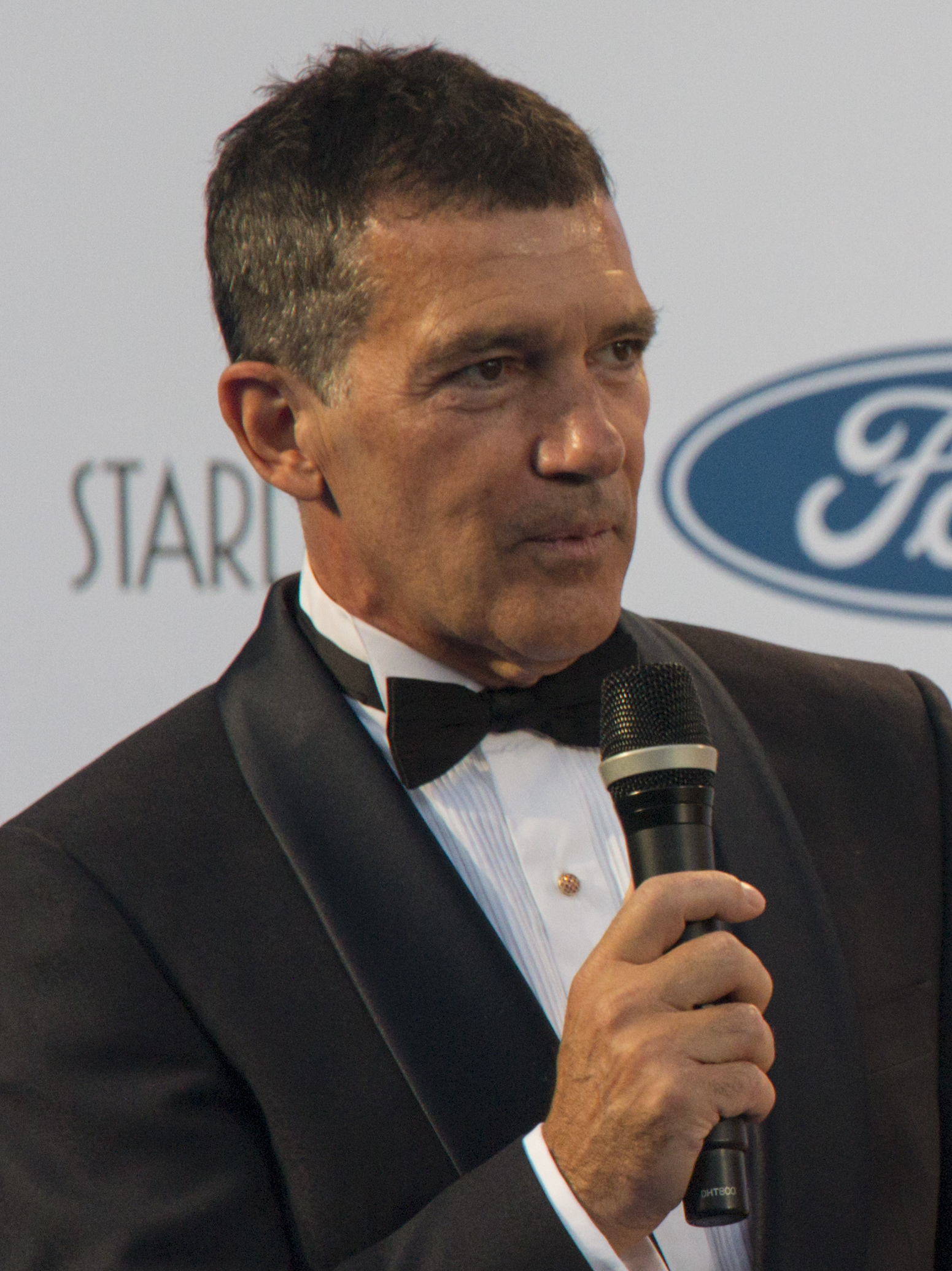
Antonio Banderas won Best Actor

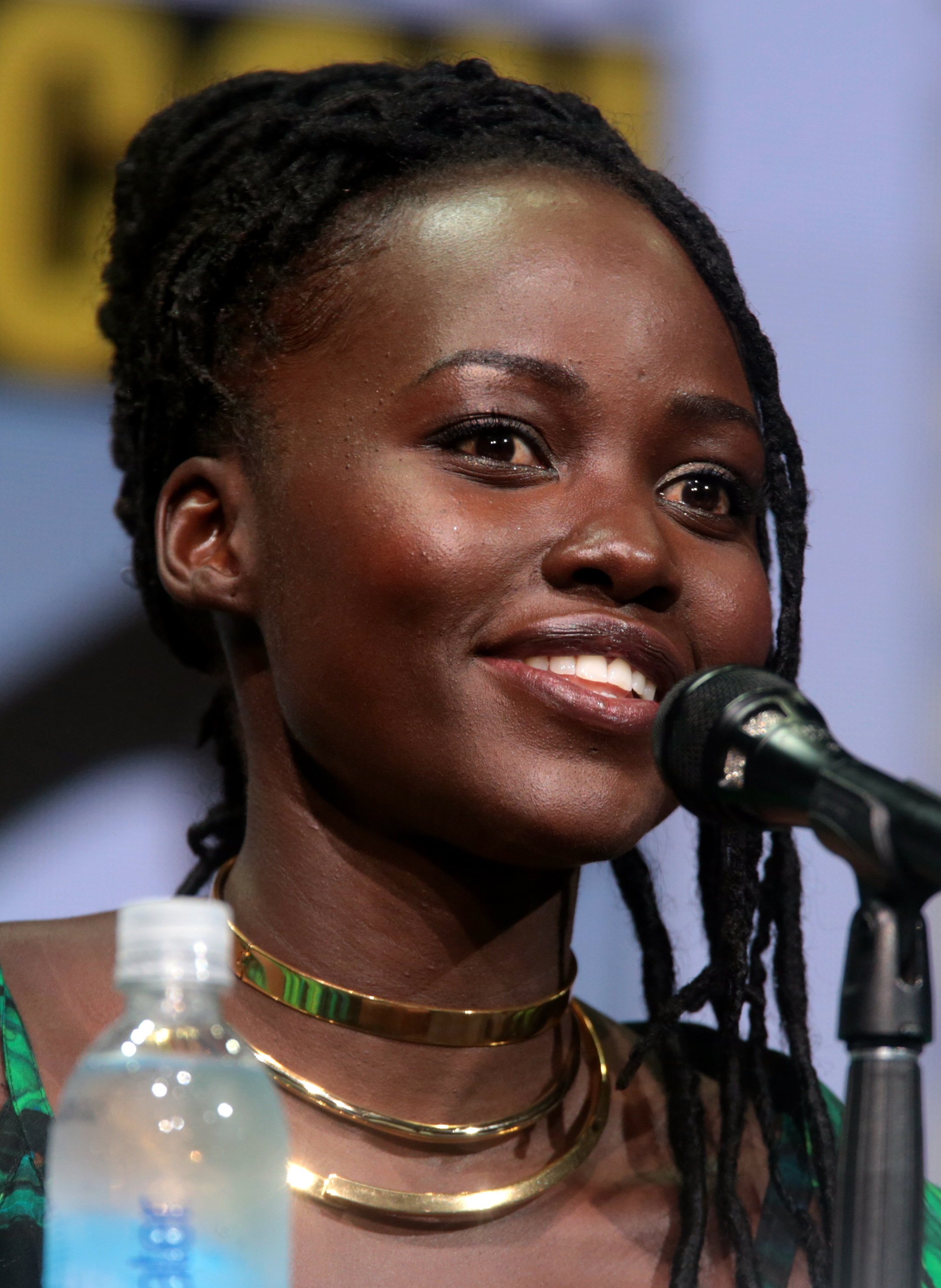
Lupita Nyong'o won Best Actress

- Best Film
  - The Irishman
- Best Director
  - Josh and Benny Safdie – Uncut Gems
- Best Actor
  - Antonio Banderas – Pain and Glory
- Best Actress
  - Lupita Nyong'o – Us
- Best Supporting Actor
  - Joe Pesci – The Irishman
- Best Supporting Actress
  - Laura Dern – Marriage Story & Little Women
- Best Screenplay
  - Quentin Tarantino – Once Upon a Time in Hollywood
- Best Animated Film
  - I Lost My Body
- Best Cinematography
  - Claire Mathon – Portrait of a Lady on Fire
- Best Non-Fiction Film
  - Honeyland
- Best Foreign Language Film
  - Parasite • South Korea
- Best First Film
  - Mati Diop – Atlantics
