= MAMI Mumbai Film Festival 2024 =

Annual film festival

- Opening film: All We Imagine as Light by Payal Kapadia
- Closing film: Anora by Sean Baker
- Location: Mumbai, India
- Awards: Golden Gateway Award: Rhythm of a Flower by Amit Dutta
- Directors: Shivendra Singh Dungarpur
- Artistic director: Deepti Dcunha
- Festival date: Opening: 19 October 2024; Closing: 24 October 2024
- Website: www.mumbaifilmfestival.com

MAMI Mumbai Film Festival
- TBA 2023

The MAMI Mumbai Film Festival 2024 took place between 19 and 24 October 2024 in Mumbai, India. It was the first edition of the festival under interim festival director Shivendra Singh Dungarpur, following the departure of Anupama Chopra from the festival director position. It was also the first edition of the festival since 2014 to not have a title sponsor.

As with the 2023 edition of the festival, the main competition of the festival was limited to filmmakers from South Asia (except Pakistan) and the South Asian diaspora. Netherlands-based film director, lecturer, and film programmer Rada Šešić was named the Head of Jury for this South Asia Competition.

Over 110 films from over 45 countries were screened during this edition of the festival, for which PVR INOX and Regal Cinema continued to serve as screening venue partners.

The animation film Rhythm of a Flower by Amit Dutta won the Golden Gateway Award at the festival, while the documentary Nocturnes by Anirban Dutta and Anupama Srinivasan won the Silver Gateway Award.

== Background ==
The 2023 edition of the MAMI Mumbai Film Festival ("Jio MAMI Mumbai Film Festival 2023") was the first in-person edition of the festival since 2019, as the festival had to go on hiatus from 2020 onwards due to the COVID-19 pandemic, as well as what were described by MAMI as 'logistical and financial challenges'.

The 2024 edition of the festival was announced in May 2024 as a six-day event to be held in October that year. Due to the lack of a title sponsor, the festival's scope was drastically downsized from the previous edition, from over 250 films being screened in 2023 to over 110 films being screened in 2024. Furthermore, the number of festival venues was reduced to three - Soho House Mumbai and PVR Dynamix Mall in Juhu, and Regal Cinema in Colaba. Of these venues, only the latter two were accessible to general delegates.

In an open letter to supporters and delegates of the festival published in October 2024, the MAMI team acknowledged the smaller scale of the festival and described the year as a 'period of transition' during which the organisation has no title sponsor. The letter also clarified that the number of registrations had been capped in order to give every delegate 'a fair chance' to watch the films at the festival.

Delegate registration for the festival began on 6 October 2024, via the festival's long-standing registration partner BookMyShow.

== Juries ==
The following juries were constituted for this edition of the festival:

=== South Asia Competition ===
This jury awarded the Golden Gateway Award and Silver Gateway Award in the South Asia Competition, as well as the Special Jury Prize.

- Rada Šešić, Netherlands-based film director, lecturer, and film programmer (Head of Jury)
- Clarence Tsui, Hong Kong film critic
- Kate Laurie, Australian film producer
- Jérôme Baron, French artistic director of the Three Continents Festival
- Marie Fuglestein Lægreid, Norwegian film producer

=== Dimensions Mumbai ===
This jury awarded the Dimensions Mumbai Gold and Dimensions Mumbai Silver awards.

- Amit V. Masurkar, Indian film director and screenwriter
- Chaitanya Tamhane, Indian filmmaker
- Paromita Vohra, Indian filmmaker and writer

=== Royal Stag Barrel Select Large Short Films ===
This jury awarded the Royal Stag Barrel Select Large Short Films for Best Film award as well as the associated Special Jury Prize.

- Aditi Rao Hydari, Indian actor
- Hansal Mehta, Indian filmmaker
- Rajshri Deshpande, Indian actor and social activist

=== NETPAC ===
This jury awarded the NETPAC (Network for the Promotion of Asian Cinema) award to a film from the South Asia Competition section.

- Dr Ida Yoshinaga, US-based assistant professor at Georgia Institute of Technology
- Dr Tsengel Davaasambuu, Mongolian film producer and distributor
- Upali Gamlath, Sri Lankan filmmaker, writer, and producer

=== Film Critics Guild ===
This jury awarded the Film Critics Guild Gender Sensitivity Award to one South Asian film that 'questions gender norms and challenges stereotypes'.

- Monika Rawal, Indian film critic
- Rohit Khilnani, Indian journalist and film critic
- Sanyukta Thakare, Indian journalist and film critic

=== Best Book on Cinema Award ===
This jury awarded the Best Book on Cinema Award, which celebrates 'unique perspectives and nuanced, immersive film writing on cinema'.

- Deepanjana Pal, Indian journalist and author
- Girish Shahane, Indian writer and curator
- Jerry Pinto, Indian writer, editor, poet, and translator

The shortlist of nominees for this award included non-fiction books by Amitava Nag, Sanjoy Patnaik, Mukesh Manjunath, and Shoma A. Chatterji.

== Programmes ==
The MAMI Mumbai Film Festival 2024 was organised into the following sections:

- South Asia Competition – Films from South Asia and the South Asian diaspora, competing for the Golden Gateway Award, amongst other awards.
- Focus South Asia – Films from South Asia and the South Asian diaspora, not in competition.
- World Cinema – Films from across the world.
- Gala Premieres – Films from India that feature 'popular names' in their cast.
- Dimensions Mumbai – Short films set in the city of Mumbai, competing for the Dimensions Mumbai Gold and Silver Awards.
- Royal Stag Barrel Select Large Short Films – Short films, competing for the associated Best Film and Special Jury Prize awards.
- Restored Classics – Restored classic films from across the world.

Additionally, in the Tribute section, the festival screened the 1984 Hindi film Tarang, paying homage to the film's director Kumar Shahani, who died in February 2024. This screening was followed by a panel discussion moderated by Indian film scholar Ashish Rajadhyaksha.

As part of celebrating the career of Shabana Azmi alongside granting her the Excellence in Cinema award, the festival hosted a masterclass in conversation with Indian actor Vidya Balan, with the intention of offering insight into Azmi's 50 year long career. The festival also held a special screening of the 1982 Hindi film Arth, one of Azmi's most well-known films.

Apart from these sections and special screenings, the festival screened All We Imagine as Light by Payal Kapadia as the opening film on 18 October, and Anora by Sean Baker as the closing film on 24 October.

Although the documentaries Russians at War and No Other Land were selected for the festival programme under the World Cinema section, their screenings were cancelled as the festival did not receive 'the required permissions' in time.

== Awards ==
=== South Asia Competition ===
- Golden Gateway Award: Rhythm of a Flower by Amit Dutta
- Silver Gateway Award: Nocturnes by Anirban Dutta and Anupama Srinivasan
- Special Jury Prize: The Fable by Raam Reddy
- Special Mention: Girls Will Be Girls by Shuchi Talati
- Rashid Irani Young Critics Choice Award: Girls Will Be Girls by Shuchi Talati
- NETPAC Award: Girls Will Be Girls by Shuchi Talati
- NETPAC Special Mentions: Agent of Happiness by Arun Bhattarai and Dorottya Zurbó, and Shambhala by Min Bahadur Bham
- Film Critics Guild Gender Sensitivity Award: Girls Will Be Girls by Shuchi Talati

=== Royal Stag Barrel Select Large Short Film ===
- Special Jury Prize: Coming Back to Life (Et moi, je revis) by Mantra Watsa

=== Dimensions Mumbai ===
- Gold Award: BMCLD by Shreela Agarwal
- Silver Award: A Tale of Two Cities by Sameeha Sabnis

=== Other Awards ===
- Best Book on Cinema Award: The Age of Heroes: The Incredible World of Telugu Cinema by Mukesh Manjunath
- Rashid Irani Best Young Critic Award: Sarth Patel
- Excellence in Cinema Award, which is awarded to one or more individuals 'who have made outstanding, long-lasting contributions to the world of film and cinema'. In 2024, this award was bestowed on Indian actor Shabana Azmi, celebrating 50 years of her career in film.
