= Anupama Srinivasan =

Indian filmmaker

- Occupations: Film director; editor
- Notable work: Flickering Lights (2023); Nocturnes (2024)

Anupama Srinivasan is an Indian film director. She is known for the documentaries Flickering Lights (2023) and Nocturnes (2024), both co-directed with Anirban Dutta.

== Early life and education ==
She received her BA in Applied Mathematics from Harvard University and furthered her studies in film direction at Film and Television Institute of India, Pune.

== Career ==
In 2015, Anupama and Dutta started working on Flickering Lights, a documentary about a village in Manipur awaiting electricity. It was screened at the Busan International Film Festival in South Korea and won the award for best cinematography at the International Documentary Film Festival Amsterdam.

=== Nocturnes (2024) ===
The idea for Nocturnes began when Anirban Dutta and Anupama met Mansi by chance at a restaurant in the western Himalayas. Mansi spoke passionately about her research on moths in the Eastern Himalayas. Intrigued by her stories and the beauty of the forest, Anirban and Anupama decided to change their plans and focus on making a film about Mansi's work with moths.

Nocturnes received acclaim at the Sundance Film Festival, winning the World Cinema Documentary Special Jury Award for Craft. The jury at Sundance said, "The images and sound in this film immediately invoke in the audience a meditative state as they enter the film's world, at the same time bringing a laser focus to the film's main subject. The confidence of the cinematography and sound design in building this story is part of its power and allure".

Nocturnes was also selected for the MAMI Mumbai Film Festival 2024, where it competed in the South Asia Competition and won the Silver Gateway Award., as well as the Thessaloniki Documentary Festival, where it won the WWF Award for Best Film in the Habitat Section.

== Selected filmography ==
- Nocturnes (2024 documentary)
- Flickering Lights (2023 documentary)
- Nirnay (2012)
- I Wonder... (2009)
- On my Own Again (2007)
- On my Own (2002)

== Awards and recognition ==
- Nocturnes – Silver Gateway Award, South Asia Competition at MAMI Mumbai Film Festival 2024
- Nocturnes – World Cinema Documentary Special Jury Award for Craft at Sundance Film Festival (2024)
- Nocturnes – WWF Award for Best Film at Thessaloniki Documentary Festival (2024)
- Flickering Lights – Best Cinematography at International Documentary Film Festival Amsterdam (2023)
- Nirnay – Most Innovative Film Award at Mumbai International Film Festival (2014)
