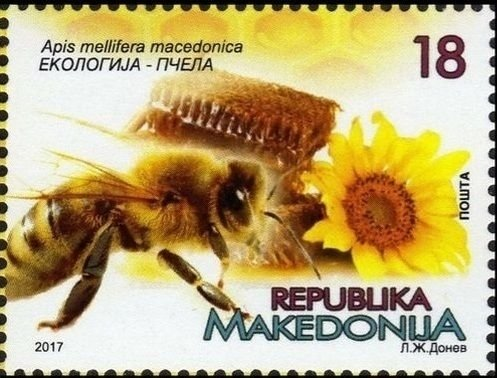

Scientific classification
- Kingdom: Animalia
- Phylum: Arthropoda
- Class: Insecta
- Order: Hymenoptera
- Family: Apidae
- Genus: Apis
- Species: A. mellifera
- Subspecies: A. m. macedonica

Trinomial name
- Apis mellifera macedonica Ruttner, 1988

Synonyms
- Apis mellifera rodopica Petrov, 1991

= Apis mellifera macedonica =

Macedonian bee

Subspecies of Western honey bee

The Macedonian bee (Apis mellifera macedonica) is a subspecies of the western honey bee. It is found mainly in Albania, Bulgaria, North Macedonia, Northern Greece and other places in the Balkans as well. Originally this subspecies was described based on morphological characteristics by Friedrich Ruttner, as were the adami, cecropia and cypria subspecies.

The bee populations of Thrace, Macedonia, Central Greece and the Peloponnese are completely distinguishable from those on the island of Crete. Studies of bee populations in 2005 from various areas of Greece (Ikaria, Kasos, Kythira, Phthiotis, Macedonia) and Cyprus analyzing mitochondrial DNA segments and finding differences in enzymatic restrictions, resulting in Apis mellifera adami, Apis mellifera cecropia and Apis mellifera cypria having a haplotype which differs from the Macedonian Apis mellifera haplotype, this subspecies being the most distant of all.

== Non-recognition of the Ruttner hypothesis ==
Ruttner distinguished A. m. macedonica from A. m. carnica in 1988, assigning a geographical distribution to the subspecies in northern Greece, Bulgaria, Romania and (perhaps) part of the former USSR. Other naturalists recognize Ruttner's subspecies as A. m. rodopica and A. m. carpatica.

== Bibliography ==
- Ifantidis, M.D. (1979). "Morphological characters of the Greek Bee Apis Mellifica Cecropia". XXVII Apimondia Congress, Athens: 271–277.
- Lynch, M.; Crease, T.J. (1990). "The Analysis of Population Survey Data of DNA sequence variation". Molecular Biology and Evolution. 7 (7): 377–394. doi:10.1093/oxfordjournals.molbev.a040607. PMID 1974693.
- Ruttner, Friedrich (2013). Biogeography and Taxonomy of Honeybees. Berlin: Springer Science+Business Media. ISBN 9783642726491.
- Ruttner, Friedrich (2003). Naturgeschichte der Honigbienen [Natural history of the Honey bee] (in German) (2 ed.). Kosmos. ISBN 9783440094778.
- Saiki RK, Gelfand DH, Stoffel S, Scharf SJ, Higuchi R, Horn GT, Mullis KB, Erlich HA (1988). "Primer directed enzymatic amplification of DNA with thermostable DNA polymerase". Science. 239 (238): 487–491. Bibcode:1988Sci...239..487S. doi:10.1126/science.2448875. PMID 2448875.
- Bouga, Maria; Paschalis, C; Kilias Harizanis, George; Alahiotis, Stamatis Nikolaos (2005). "Genetic divergence and phylogenetic relationships of honey bee Apis mellifera (Hymenoptera: Apidae) populations from Greece and Cyprus using PCR - RFLP analysis of three mtDNA segments". Apidologie. 36 (3): 335–344. doi:10.1051/apido:2005021.
- Sheppard, W.S.; Arias, M.C.; Grech, A.; Meixner, M.D. (1997). "Apis mellifera ruttneri, a new honey bee subspecies from Malta". Apidologie. 28 (5): 287–293. doi:10.1051/apido:19970505.
