= Gamak Ghar =

2019 film

- Directed by: Achal Mishra
- Screenplay by: Achal Mishra
- Produced by: Achal Mishra
- Starring: Abhinav Jha; Mira Jha; Satyendra Jha; Bikram Singh; Soniya Jha
- Cinematography: Anand Bansal
- Edited by: Achal Mishra
- Music by: Anshuman Sharma
- Production company: Achalchitra
- Distributed by: Deaf Crocodile Films / Gratitude Films
- Release date: 2019
- Running time: 91 minutes
- Country: India
- Language: Maithili

Gamak Ghar (transl. The Village House) is a 2019 Indian Maithili-language feature film written, edited, produced, and directed by Achal Mishra. The film premiered at 21st MAMI Mumbai Film Festival 2019, where it won the inaugural Manish Acharya Award for New Voices in Indian Cinema.

The film chronicles two decades of a family house in a small village in Darbhanga, Mithila.

== Plot ==
Summer 1998: a family reunites at their ancestral home to celebrate a new birth in the family. It is a joyous, carefree occasion, with trips to the mango grove, games of cards, feasts, and light-hearted conversations.

Autumn 2010: the landscape of the village has changed significantly. Awkward lunch conversations, formal speech, and unspoken decisions reveal that the family is no longer as close as it once was. While the elders struggle with tangled family dynamics, the younger members reminisce fondly about the old days, digging up old family photographs and memorabilia.

Winter 2019: engulfed in a dense fog, the house feels like a ghost of its former self. Nobody visits the house any more, and the neglect is visible in the mouldy walls, flaking plaster, and unhinged doors.

== Cast ==
- Abhinav Jha
- Mira Jha
- Satyendra Jha
- Bikram Singh
- Soniya Jha
- Chandra Mohan Mishra
- Annu Singh
- Satyam Jha
- Prashant Rana

== Reception ==
The film has received largely positive reviews from critics. Mayank Shekhar of Mid-Day wrote, "The beauty of Achal's soft framing/touch is he never lets heaviness of a plot, or clichés of lament, get in the way of what connoisseurs of art will instantly classify as pure impressionism. A lot like Turner; both the painter, and the film!" and crowned the film "the Pather Panchali of Mithila." Namrata Joshi of The Hindu called it "a poignant ode to the village home", further writing, "Gamak Ghar is structured like a tripartite movement of a gentle musical piece that encompasses within it the cycle of life". Writing for Rediff.com, Aseem Chhabra compared the film to the works of Yasujiro Ozu and Hirokazu Kore-eda. In a 4 star review, Pratishruti Ganguly of Firstpost wrote, "Gamak Ghar's brilliance lies in Mishra's masterful manipulation of the craft of cinema. He directs with affection and precision, but his touch is so nimble that sometimes it feels like you're revisiting your family video reels, and not watching a feature film."

Among the overseas reviewers, Glenn Heath Jr. of The Film Stage wrote: "Like master filmmakers Edward Yang and Hou Hsiao-hsien, Mishra understands how cinematic aesthetics can beautifully mirror the invisible momentum of time." The film was included in The Film Stage's list of 'Best Undistributed Films of 2020.' Reviewing the film at San Diego Asian Film Festival 2020, Soham Gadre of Film Inquiry wrote: "Achal Mishra uses nostalgia in an effectively artful way in Gamak Ghar, building a densely layered and brilliantly realized portrait of cultural erosion."

Brazilian filmmaker Fernando Meirelles who saw the film at the Mumbai Film Festival said: "Having a house as a protagonist and building a story around it is remarkable. I thoroughly enjoyed the film." Indian actor Pankaj Tripathi, in an interview with Huffington Post, recommended the film saying, "The film reminded me of my own past. It felt so personal, I was moved to tears."

== Accolades ==
- Manish Acharya Award for New Voices in Indian Cinema, Jio MAMI Mumbai Film Festival 2019
- Best Director, New York Indian Film Festival 2020
- Best Fiction Feature Film, Coalition of South Asian Film Festivals 2020
- Best Feature Film, Indic Film Utsav 2020
- VKAAO Award for Most Anticipated Film by a Debut Director, NFDC Film Bazaar 2019
- Best Indian Film of 2019 Finalist, FIPRESCI India Grand Prix
