= Against the Tide (sculpture) =

Monument in Amsterdam, the Netherlands

Against the Tide (Dutch: Tegen alle stromen in)
- Against the Tide, July 2025
- Artist: Rini Hurkmans
- Year: 2024
- Type: patinated bronze, paint
- Dimensions: 285 cm × 525 cm × 275 cm (112 in × 207 in × 108 in)
- Location: Leidseplein (outdoor) intersection of Leidseplein and Kleine-Gartmanplantsoen, Amsterdam, Netherlands]; 52°21′50″N 4°52′58″E

Against the Tide (Dutch: Tegen alle stromen in), sometimes referred to by its more literal translation as Against All Currents, by Rini Hurkmans, is a memorial sculpture honoring murdered Dutch journalist Peter R. de Vries who was shot on July 6, 2021, and died on July 15, 2021. It was unveiled on July 15, 2024. The sculpture is located in Leidseplein, which is a square in central Amsterdam, Netherlands.

De Vries was the third person slain in connection to the Marengo trial. The unveiling took place exactly three years after his death and just months after De Vries' shooter and several collaborators were sentenced. The sculpture is located just meters from Lange Leidsedwarsstraat, where the shooting took place. The unveiling was presided by Femke Halsema, Mayor of Amsterdam and included four people who had been helped by de Vries' journalistic efforts.

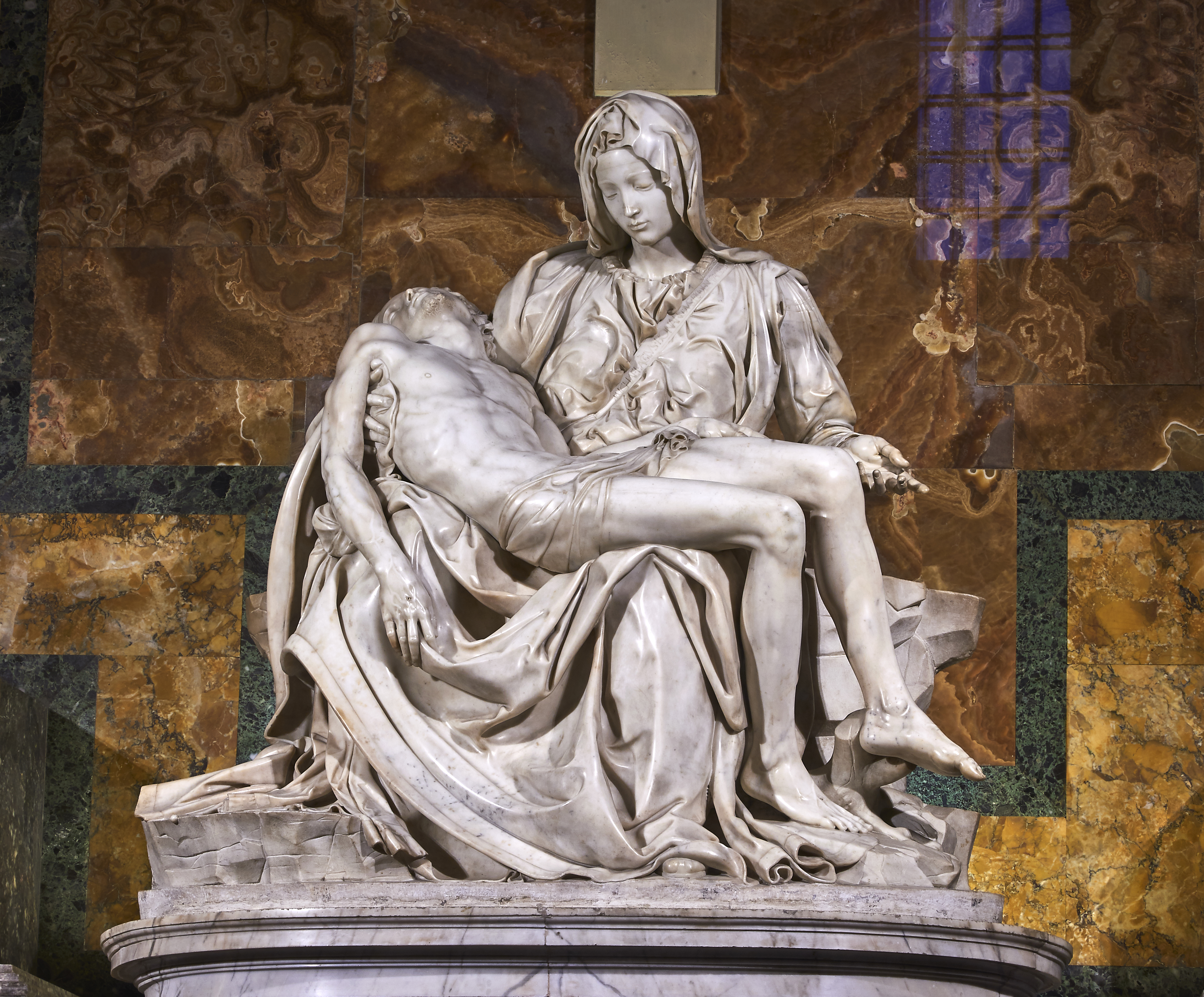
Mary's hand gesture in Pietà was an inspiration for the sculpture

Hurkmans was inspired by a hand gesture in Pietà by the Virgin Mary who was cradling the lifeless body of her son, Jesus. During the unveiling, his daughter, Kelly de Vries, noted that the sculpture symbolized her father by connecting those who engage with it to the rules her father lived by. The sculpture bears the words "be who you are, stand up for minorities and the less fortunate, speak your mind honestly, and listen to your sense of justice." in 41 languages. The quote came from messages de Vries has relayed to his two children. The creation of the sculpture is the subject of a Dutch language documentary film by Nederlandse Publieke Omroep, the Dutch Foundation for Public Broadcasting.
