= Against the Tide (2023 film) =

- Poster
- Directed by: Sarvnik Kaur
- Written by: Sarvnik Kaur
- Produced by: Koval Bhatia; Sarvnik Kaur
- Starring: Rakesh Koli; Ganesh Nakhawa
- Cinematography: Ashok Meena
- Edited by: Atanas Georgiev; Blagoja Nedelkovski
- Music by: Igor Vasilev Novogradska
- Production companies: Snooker Club Films; A Little Anarky Films; Les Films de l'Oeil Sauvage
- Release date: 20 January 2023
- Running time: 97 minutes
- Countries: India; France
- Languages: Marathi; Hindi; English

Against the Tide is a 2023 documentary film directed by Sarvnik Kaur. It is produced by Koval Bhatia and Sarvnik Kaur under the banners of Snooker Club Films, A Little Anarky Films and Les Films de l'Oeil Sauvage. The film got official selections at various film festivals, which include San Francisco International Film Festival 2023, Seattle International Film Festival 2023, 2023 Sundance Film Festival, Sheffield DocFest 2023, Dharamshala International Film Festival and 2nd Eikhoigi Imphal International Film Festival.

== Synopsis ==
The film details the lives of two fishermen from the Koli community of Mumbai. One fisherman, Ganesh follows modern practices and owns a crewed fishing boat, has a modern apartment, but is saddled with debt, while the other, Rakesh, follows the traditional practices of the community and lives in a modest way. The film contrasts the two men while exploring the larger currents at play in 21st century India.

== Reception ==
Devika Girish of The New York Times opined, "Sarvnik Kaur's breathtaking documentary about indigenous fishermen in Mumbai brings to life an ecosystem wrecked by corporate greed and climate change." Siddhant Adlakha of IndieWire said it was "a film concerned with conveying blockades — both logistical and emotional — more than solutions."

== Accolades ==
Festival	Award	Result	Ref.
Seattle International Film Festival 2023	Documentary Competition Award	Won	
2023 Sundance Film Festival	Grand Jury Prize: World Cinema - Documentary	Won	
2023 Sundance Film Festival	Vérité Filmmaking	Won	
Sydney Film Festival 2023	Sustainable Feature Award	Won	
Asia Pacific Screen Awards 2023	Best Documentary Film	Won	
MAMI Mumbai Film Festival 2023	Golden Gateway Award: International Competition	Won	
Gotham Independent Film Awards 2023	Best Documentary	Nominated	
International Documentary Association Awards 2023	Best Feature Documentary	Nominated	
International Documentary Association Awards 2023	Best Director	Nominated	
Munich International Documentary Festival 2023 (DOK.fest)	Viktor Award DOK.horizons	Nominated	
Bergen International Film Festival 2023	Documentaire Extraordinaire	Nominated	
Visions du Réel International Film Festival Nyon 2023	Audience Award: Grand Angle Competition	Nominated	
Cinema Eye Honors Awards 2024, USA	Spotlight Award	Nominated	
DocsBarcelona, ES 2023	Best Documentary: DocsBarcelona TV3 Award	Nominated	
