= MAMI Mumbai Film Festival 2023 =

- Opening film: The Buckingham Murders by Hansal Mehta
- Closing film: Priscilla by Sofia Coppola
- Location: Mumbai, India
- Awards: Golden Gateway Award: Against the Tide by Sarvnik Kaur
- Directors: Anupama Chopra
- Artistic director: Deepti Dcunha
- Festival date: Opening: 27 October 2023; Closing: 5 November 2023
- Website: www.mumbaifilmfestival.com

MAMI Mumbai Film Festival
- 2024 21st 22nd (cancelled)

The MAMI Mumbai Film Festival 2023 took place between 27 October and 5 November 2023 in Mumbai, India. It was the first in-person edition of the MAMI Mumbai Film Festival since the outbreak of the COVID-19 pandemic, and it was also the final edition with Anupama Chopra serving as the Festival Director. Indian-American filmmaker Mira Nair was named the Head of Jury for the South Asia Competition.

Over 250 films were screened during this edition of the festival, with the Nita Mukesh Ambani Cultural Centre serving as the festival hub, and PVR INOX and Regal Cinema serving as the screening venue partners.

The documentary Against the Tide, directed by filmmaker Sarvnik Kaur, won the Golden Gateway Award, while the feature film Bahadur: The Brave by Diwa Shah won the Silver Gateway Award in the South Asia Competition at the festival.

== Background ==
Following the 21st edition of the festival ("Jio MAMI 21st Mumbai Film Festival with Star"), the COVID-19 pandemic prevented the in-person hosting of the 22nd Mumbai Film Festival in 2020. The in-person event was postponed to 2021, then March 2022, and was eventually cancelled due to 'logistical and financial challenges'.

A number of filmmakers whose films had been chosen for the 22nd edition of the festival protested the cancellation of the event and demanded in-person screenings of their films. However, films from the official selection for this edition of the Mumbai Film Festival were eventually screened online from 24 February to 16 March 2022, in partnership with Shift72.

In February 2023, it was announced that the film festival would be returning as an in-person event later that year, backed by long-standing title partner Jio. This was notably the first edition of the festival not to have the edition number in its title, using the year of the festival instead.

The main competition for this year was limited to filmmakers from South Asian countries (excluding Pakistan) and the South Asian diaspora.

This edition of the festival, which spanned 10 days, also featured more screening venues than previous editions of the festival, expanding from mainstay venues in Andheri, Juhu, Bandra, and Colaba, to multiplexes in Ghatkopar, Malad, and Goregaon.

== Opening and closing ceremonies ==
The festival's opening ceremony took place on 27 October at the Nita Mukesh Ambani Cultural Centre. It was attended by stars from across Indian film industries, including MAMI chairperson Priyanka Chopra Jonas, who presented the Excellence in Cinema Award (International) award to Italian filmmaker Luca Guadagnino. Indian director Mani Ratnam received the Excellence in Cinema (South Asia) award.

In the opening ceremony, Chopra Jonas championed female filmmakers, describing their contribution to cinema as "unparalleled". The Buckingham Murders by Hansal Mehta was screened during the opening ceremony.

The closing ceremony was held on 3 November, and was hosted by India-based French actor Kalki Koechlin. The South Asia Competition Jury awarded the Golden Gateway Award to Against the Tide by Sarvnik Kaur, a documentary about the Koli fishing community in Mumbai. The jury also awarded the Silver Gateway Award to Bahadur: The Brave by Diwa Shah, a feature film about Nepali migrant workers in India; and the Special Jury Award was given to Agra by Kanu Behl.

Priscilla by Sofia Coppola was screened during the closing ceremony. Although the closing ceremony marked the end of the festival's main programming, the most popular titles of the festival continued to be screened on 4 and 5 November.

== Juries ==
The following juries were constituted for this edition of the festival:

=== South Asia Competition ===
- Mira Nair, Indian-American filmmaker (Head of Jury)
- David Michôd, Australian film director
- Edouard Waintrop, French film critic
- Isabel Sandoval, Filipino filmmaker and actress

=== Dimensions Mumbai ===
- Anvita Dutt, Indian filmmaker
- Shahana Goswami, Indian actress
- Shriya Pilgaonkar, Indian actress

=== Royal Stag Barrel Select Large Short Films ===
- Anurag Kashyap, Indian filmmaker
- Paolo Bertolin, Italian film critic and festival programmer
- Sobhita Dhulipala, Indian actress

=== NETPAC Award ===
- Gulnara Abikeyeva, Kazakh film critic (Head of Jury)
- Latika Padgaonkar, Indian writer, editor, and translator
- Nashen Moodley, Australian-South African film festival director

=== Film Critics Guild Gender Sensitivity Award ===
- Bharathi Pradhan, Indian film critic and author (Head of Jury)
- Aditya Shrikrishna, Indian film critic and journalist
- Stutee Ghosh, Indian film critic and radio jockey

== Programmes ==
The Jio MAMI Mumbai Film Festival 2023 was organised into the following sections:

- South Asia Competition – Films from South Asia and the South Asian diaspora, competing for the Golden Gateway Award, amongst other awards.
- Focus South Asia – Films from South Asia and the South Asian diaspora, not in competition.
- Icons: South Asia – Films from South Asia and the South Asian diaspora, from established filmmakers.
- Gala Premieres – Films from South Asia and the South Asian diaspora, that are expected to see wider, mainstream release in the future.
- World Cinema – Films from across the world.
- Filmmakers' Programme – Debut and second international films, screened exclusively to filmmakers participating in the festival, at the Nita Mukesh Ambani Cultural Centre.
- After Dark – Independent genre films from across the world.
- Dimensions Mumbai – Short films set in the city of Mumbai, competing for the Dimensions Mumbai Gold and Silver Awards.
- Royal Stag Barrel Select Large Short Films – Short films, competing for the associated Best Film and Best Actor awards.
- Play – Premieres of series from streaming services.
- Marathi Talkies – Feature-length and short films in the Marathi language.
- Restored Classics – Restored classic films from across the world.
- Retrospective – Dedicated in 2023 to select films starring Indian actor Bharat Gopy, and to films directed by French filmmaker duo Jean-Marie Straub and Danièle Huillet.
- Tributes – Films associated with filmmakers, actors, and other film-related individuals who died in 2022 or 2023.
- Recap – Films selected for the 2020 and 2022 editions of the festival, which did not see theatre screening due to festival cancellation or online screening.

== Awards ==
=== South Asia Competition ===
- Golden Gateway Award: Against the Tide by Sarvnik Kaur
- Silver Gateway Award: Bahadur: The Brave by Diwa Shah
- Special Jury Prize: Agra by Kanu Behl
- Rashid Irani Young Critics Choice Award: Kayo Kayo Colour? (Which Colour?) by Shahrukhkhan Chavada
- NETPAC Award: Rimdogittanga (Rapture) by Dominic Sangma

=== Royal Stag Barrel Select Large Short Film ===
- Royal Stag Barrel Select Large Short Film for Best Film: Summer of Soul by Sanjib Gogoi
- Royal Stag Barrel Select Large Short Film for Best Actor: James Elia, for Vakuppu (The Clause) by Jayaraj R

=== Dimensions Mumbai ===
- Dimensions Mumbai Gold Award: Nightingales in the Cocoon by Praveen Giri
- Dimensions Mumbai Silver Award: Halfway by Kumar Chheda

=== Film Critics Guild Gender Sensitivity Award ===
- Barir Naam Shahana (A House Named Shahana) by Leesa Gazi

=== IMDb Audience Choice Award ===
- The Monk and the Gun by Pawo Choyning Dorji

=== Best Book on Cinema Award ===
- The Mahatma on Celluloid: A Cinematic Biography by Prakash Magdum
