= Tamara Kotevska =

Macedonian filmmaker (born 1993)

- Тамара Котевска
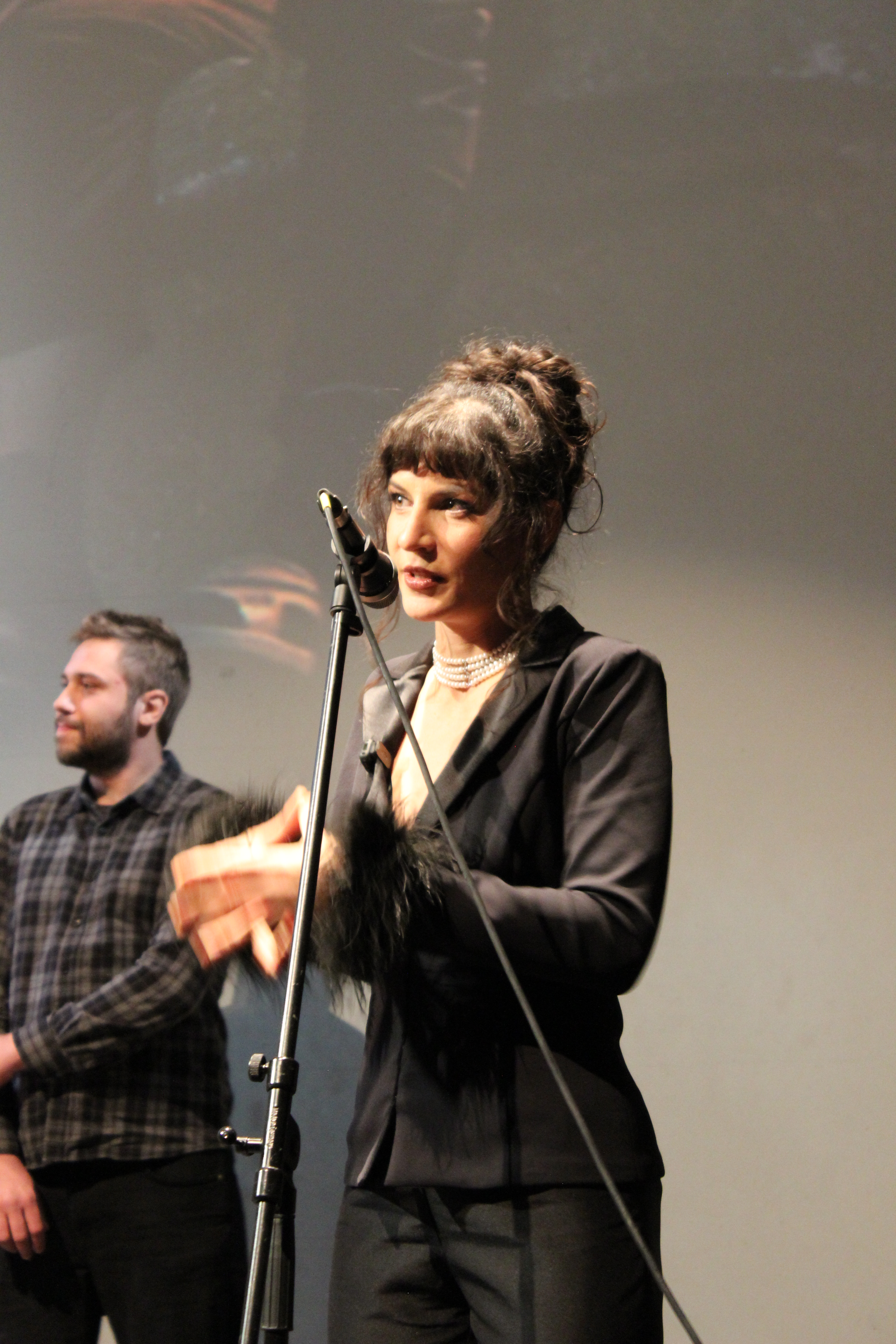
- Kotevska in 2025
- Born: 9 August 1993 (age 33); Prilep, Macedonia
- Education: Ss. Cyril and Methodius University of Skopje
- Occupation: Filmmaker
- Known for: Honeyland (2019)

Tamara Kotevska (Macedonian: Тамара Котевска; born 9 August 1993) is a Macedonian filmmaker best known for her 2019 documentary Honeyland.

== Early life ==
Kotevska was born in Prilep, Republic of Macedonia (now North Macedonia). She earned a scholarship to study abroad in Tennessee for her junior year in high school. She graduated from the Faculty of Dramatic Arts at the Sts. Cyril and Methodius University in Skopje, with an emphasis in documentary film.

== Career ==
Together with Ljubomir Stefanov, Kotevska spent three years in Bekirlija, North Macedonia filming the documentary about a female wild beekeeper, Hatidze. The film was originally going to be a documentary short about the Bregalnica river region when they came across the beekeeper. Kotevska and Stefanov previously worked together on another documentary, Lake of Apples (2017).

Honeyland won three awards at the 2019 Sundance Film Festival and received two nominations at the 92nd Academy Awards: Best Documentary Feature and Best International Feature Film. It is the second Macedonian film to earn an Oscar nomination after Before the Rain (1994).

In 2025, Kotevska directed The Tale of Silyan revolving around a farmer forming a bond with a White stork he rescued. It had its world premiere at the 82nd Venice International Film Festival.

== Filmography ==
=== Documentaries ===
Year	English Title	Original Title	Notes
2019	Honeyland	Медена земја	Co-directed with Ljubomir Stefanov
2023	The Walk	Патување пеш	
2025	The Tale of Silyan	Приказната за Силјан	
TBA	The Mammoths That Escaped the Kingdom of Erlik Khan		In production

=== Feature films ===
Year	English Title	Original Title	Notes
TBA	Man vs Flock	Човек против јато	Post-production

=== Short films ===
Year	English Title	Original Title	Notes
2017	Lake of Apples	Езеро од јаболка	Co-directed with Ljubomir Stefanov
2019	Paw Law		
2021	Solo Mode	Соло Мод	
