= Ljubomir Stefanov =

Macedonian filmmaker (born 1975)

- Љубомир Стефанов
- Born: 1975 (age 50–51); SR Macedonia, Yugoslavia
- Occupation: Filmmaker
- Known for: Honeyland (2019)

Ljubomir Stefanov (Macedonian: Љубомир Стефанов; born 1975) is a Macedonian filmmaker best known for co-directing the 2019 documentary Honeyland with Tamara Kotevska. The documentary received two nominations at the 92nd Academy Awards: Best Documentary Feature and Best International Feature Film.

Stefanov had previously collaborated with Kotevska on the environmental film Lake of Apples (2017). His expertise within the filming field is in environmentalism and ecology. He has worked in the documentary field for approximately 20 years, mainly working on communication concepts and documentaries related to environmental issues for agencies from the United Nations, Euronatur and Swisscontact among others.

== Awards and nominations ==
As the director of Honeyland, Stefanov received two nominations for Outstanding Achievement in Cinematography and Outstanding Achievement in Nonfiction Feature Filmmaking at the Cinema Eye Honors Awards and a nomination in Outstanding Directing – Documentaries at the Directors Guild of America Awards. Stefanov won the Pare Lorentz Award at the International Documentary Association Awards while receiving two other nominations along with Kotevska.

== Filmography ==
- The Noisy Neighbours (2005)
- Lake of Apples (2017)
- Honeyland (2019)
