= Mumbai Academy of the Moving Image =

Public trust

Mumbai Academy of Moving Image
- Abbreviation: MAMI
- Formation: 1997
- Type: Not for profit
- Legal status: Trust
- Headquarters: Mumbai, India
- Region served: India
- Chairperson: Priyanka Chopra Jonas
- Website: www.mumbaifilmfestival.com

The Mumbai Academy of Moving Image (MAMI) is a public trust that organises the MAMI Mumbai Film Festival in the city of Mumbai, India. Priyanka Chopra Jonas is the chairperson of the trust while Shivendra Singh Dungarpur serves as the interim Festival Director.

Apart from the film festival, MAMI also organises the Year Round Programme, under which MAMI holds various activities and workshops throughout the year.

Director Shyam Benegal was the first chairperson of MAMI starting with the 1999 edition of the festival and he remained the chairperson through the 2014 edition of the festival. In 2015, he was replaced by director Kiran Rao, who would go on to serve as the chairperson until 2019, when she was replaced by actor Deepika Padukone. Padukone was then replaced by Priyanka Chopra Jonas in 2021.

== MAMI Mumbai Film Festival ==
MAMI Mumbai Film Festival
- Location: Mumbai, India
- Founded: 27 November 1997; 28 years ago
- Most recent: 2024
- Directors: Shivendra Singh Dungarpur (Interim)
- Artistic director: Deepti DCunha
- Language: International (with English subtitles)
- Website: www.mumbaifilmfestival.com

The MAMI Mumbai Film Festival is organised by the Mumbai Academy of Moving Image, which was founded by a group of Indian film industry stalwarts in 1997 and was created with the aim to "engage film lovers from all walks of life, and to foster an ideal climate of good cinema across the country by presenting the best of global and Indian cinema". The Academy’s stated vision is to celebrate cinema by hosting the annual international film festival in Mumbai, widely regarded as India's film and entertainment capital.

=== 1997 to 2014 ===
From its inception in 1997 through the 2008 edition, the festival underwent several name changes and was known at various times as the 'Festival of Films - Mumbai', 'International Film Festival - Mumbai', and 'MAMI's International Film Festival - Mumbai'. It was finally branded as the 'MAMI Mumbai Film Festival' in 2009 and has retained that name since (along with any title sponsors as available).

The festival was prominently sponsored by Reliance Entertainment from the 2008 edition of the festival through the 2013 edition. Following the end of its sponsorship in 2014, the festival was on the verge of closure due to financial struggles. Nevertheless, a 2014 edition was put together 'at the last hour' thanks to financial contributions from a vast variety of companies and Indian film industry figures, among them actor Aamir Khan, and filmmakers Vidhu Vinod Chopra, Hansal Mehta, and Rajkumar Hirani.

Following this edition of the festival, chairperson Shyam Benegal stepped down from the position, citing 'a generation gap between the board and the audience'. Long-standing Festival Director Srinivasan Narayanan also stepped down, after confirming that a 10-year business plan had been prepared, which would go into effect starting with the 2015 edition of the festival.

=== 2015 to 2023 ===
In 2015, board member Anupama Chopra (one of the financial contributors for the 2014 edition) took over as Festival Director, while convincing filmmaker Kiran Rao to become the chairperson of MAMI. That year, the festival also gained two title sponsors in the form of telecommunications giant Jio and media conglomerate Star India. The festival would hence be branded as the 'Jio MAMI Mumbai Film Festival with Star' through the 2019 edition, following which the festival lost Star India as a title sponsor.

Following on the heels of the 21st edition of the festival in 2019, the 22nd edition was scheduled to take place in 2020, but it was eventually postponed to 2021 due to the COVID-19 pandemic. It was then cancelled in 2021 due to 'logistical and financial challenges'. In February and March 2022, films selected for the 22nd edition were screened online, even as filmmakers whose films had been chosen for the festival demanded physical screenings for their films.

The festival returned in 2023 as a 10-day physical event to be held in October and November that year. It dropped the edition number from the title, instead using the year of the edition.

The Jio MAMI Mumbai Film Festival 2023 introduced the South Asia Competition as its main competition, inviting films from filmmakers of South Asia (with the exception of Pakistan) and the South Asian diaspora. Over 250 films were screened during this edition of the festival, and a special section of the programme was dedicated to screening films that had been selected for the cancelled 22nd edition of the festival.

=== 2024 to present ===
Jio's sponsorship of the festival ended with the 2023 edition, and in June 2024, Festival Director Anupama Chopra stepped down from her position, making way for filmmaker and archivist Shivendra Singh Dungarpur who took over as interim Festival Director. 2024 was hence described by MAMI as a 'period of transition'.

Despite the lack of a title sponsor, the 2024 edition of the festival was scheduled as a six-day event from 19 to 24 October 2024. This edition of the festival was planned to be drastically smaller in scale compared to previous editions.

In July 2025, the Mumbai Academy of Moving Image announced that the 2025 edition of the MAMI Mumbai Film Festival was cancelled due to an ongoing organisational restructuring.

== Year Round Programme ==
The Year Round Programme is a series of activities hosted by MAMI, which take place across the year and are open to members who have registered on the MAMI website. Some of the organised activities include:

- Previews@MAMI, under which the organisation hosts special screenings of domestic and international films.
- Word to Screen Market, which is hosted to encourage collaborations between the publishing and filmmaking industries, such as cinematic adaptations.
- Rashid Irani Young Critics Lab, which enables film critics from the ages of 18 to 25, and assists them in developing their skills in film analysis and writing.
- The Colorists Workshop, a program to develop skills among colorists through masterclasses and job shadowing.

== Controversies ==
=== Seeing Red plagiarism controversy ===
In 2025, as part of the Year Round Programme, MAMI held the "MAMI Select: Filmed on iPhone 2025" programme, under which four filmmakers from across India were provided grants and mentorship to create one short film each. One of the short films created under this programme, the Tamil-language Seeing Red by Shalini Vijayakumar, was alleged to have a storyline plagiarised from the short story Sevvarali Poocharam, written by Tamil writer Jeyarani and published in her short story collection Sennilam in December 2024. Apart from the alleged plagiarism, the film was criticised for cultural appropriation by changing the original Dalit identity of characters in the short story to upper-caste Brahmins in the film.

Director Shalini Vijayakumar rejected the accusations of plagiarism and stated that 'any resemblance to other stories is purely coincidental'. As of 3 May 2025, there were no public responses from either MAMI or the programme mentor assigned to Shalini Vijayakumar, filmmaker Vetrimaaran. Jeyarani has since sent a legal notice to both MAMI and Shalini Vijayakumar, as well as requesting MAMI to take the film off of all platforms and to halt future screenings of the film.

== Board of trustees ==
MAMI is chaired by Indian actress Priyanka Chopra Jonas. The board members of MAMI are:

- Shivendra Singh Dungarpur, filmmaker, film producer, archivist, and restorer. Also the currently interim festival director at MAMI.
- Anupama Chopra, film critic and former festival director at MAMI.
- Vikramaditya Motwane, filmmaker, film producer, and screenwriter.

Apart from the chairperson and board members, other members of the General Body are:

- Ajay Bijli, businessman and managing director of cinema chain PVR INOX.
- Anjali Menon, film director and screenwriter.
- Farhan Akhtar, actor, filmmaker, and singer.
- Kabir Khan, filmmaker and screenwriter.
- Kaustubh Dhavse, joint secretary in the Government of Maharashtra.
- Rana Daggubati, filmmaker and actor.
- Riteish Deshmukh, actor and film producer.
- Rohan Sippy, filmmaker and film producer.
- Siddharth Roy Kapur, film producer.
- Vishal Bhardwaj, filmmaker, film producer, screenwriter, and composer.
- Zoya Akhtar, filmmaker and screenwriter.

During Jio's sponsorship of MAMI from 2015 to 2023, philanthropist and businesswoman Nita Ambani was also a member of the board of trustees, along with her daughter, businesswoman Isha Ambani.
