= Alt Rehse =

- Village of Penzlin
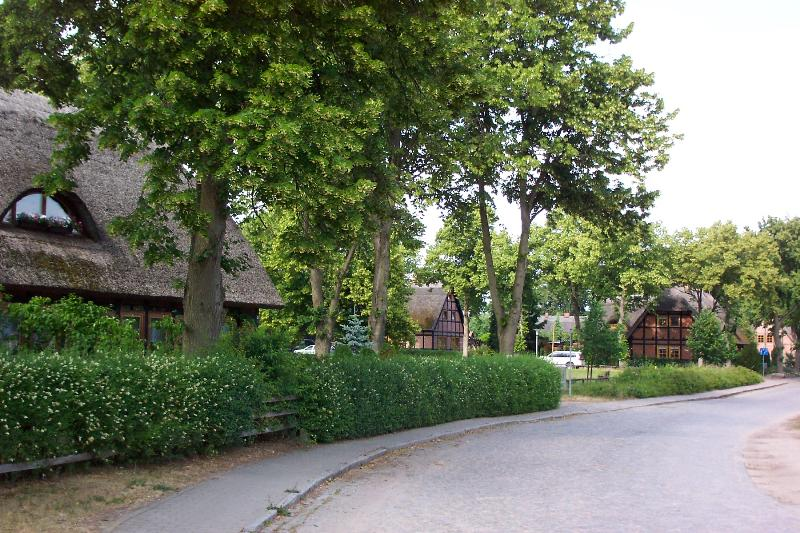
- Street in Alt Rehse (2003)

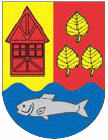
- Coat of arms
- Interactive map of Alt Rehse
- Location within Germany Location within Mecklenburg-Vorpommern
- Coordinates: 53°30′N 13°10′E
- Country: Germany
- State: Mecklenburg-Vorpommern
- District: Mecklenburgische Seenplatte
- Town: Penzlin

Area
  - Total: 9.11 km^{2} (3.52 sq mi)
- Elevation: 17 m (56 ft)

Population (2006-12-31)
  - Total: 334
  - Density: 36.7/km^{2} (95.0/sq mi)
- Time zone: UTC+01:00 (CET)
  - Summer (DST): UTC+02:00 (CEST)
- Postal codes: 17217
- Dialling codes: 03962
- Vehicle registration: MÜR
- Website: www.altrehse.de

Alt Rehse is a village and a former municipality in the Mecklenburgische Seenplatte district, in Mecklenburg-Vorpommern, Germany. On 1 July 2008, it was incorporated into the town Penzlin.

During the Nazi era it was the site of an Institute of Genetics, run by Dr Hermann Boehm, and the Führerschule der Deutschen Ärzteschaft (Leadership School of German Medicine). At this school, doctors, nurses and midwives attended a six-week course, during which they studied Nazi racial ideology, genetics, "racial science" and eugenics under Boehm. Students wore uniforms and were expected to participate in sports as well as hard daily exercise and to carry out physical labour. It was the eventual intention that all German medical professionals would pass through the school.

Buildings that accommodated the students were built in the style of traditional, rural thatched cottages. The majority still carry inscriptions indicating when they were built: "Year 3,4,5", i.e. 1936, the third year of the new, Nazi era.
