= Hermann Boehm (eugenicist) =

German eugenicist (1884–1962)

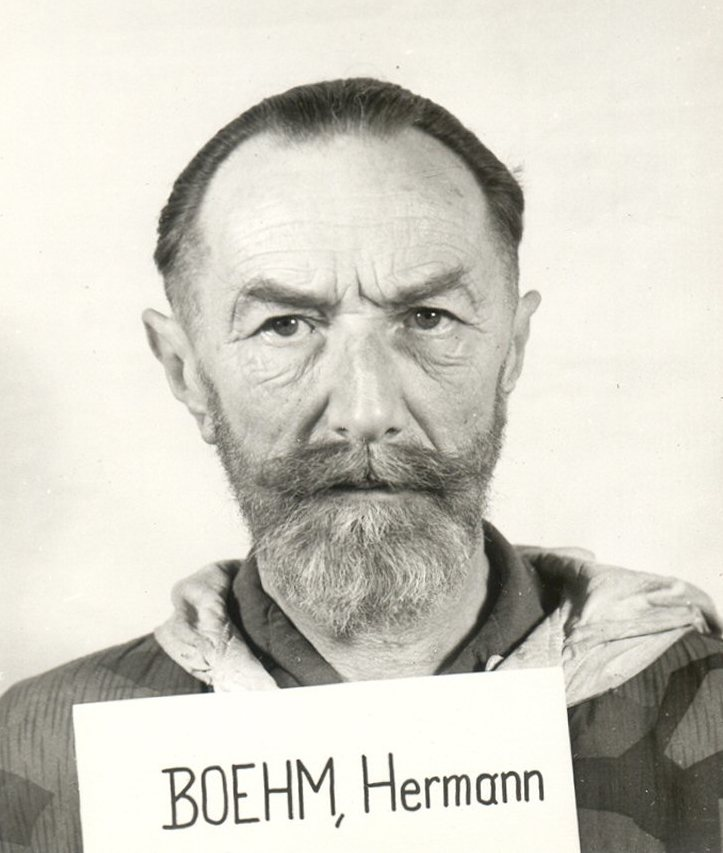
- Boehm at the Doctors' Trial in 1947

Personal details
- Born: 27 October 1884 Fürth, Kingdom of Bavaria, German Empire
- Died: 7 June 1962 (aged 77) Giessen, West Germany
- Education: Ludwig-Maximilians-Universität München
- Profession: Physician
- Known for: Racial hygiene
- Awards: Blood Order; Golden Party Badge

Military service
- Allegiance: German Empire
- Branch/service: Imperial German Army
- Years of service: 1915–1919
- Rank: Medical officer
- Battles/wars: First World War

Hermann Alois Boehm (27 October 1884 – 7 June 1962) was a German eugenicist, physician, and professor of "racial hygiene" in Nazi Germany. He was an early member of the Nazi Party and its paramilitary organization, the Sturmabteilung (SA), rising to the rank of SA-Gruppenführer. He held many important administrative, educational and clinical research posts dealing with Nazi eugenics. After the end of the Second World War, he testified at the Doctors' Trial in Nuremberg against the defendants involved in the Nazi euthanasia program but was not himself prosecuted.

== Early life and education ==
Boehm was born in Fürth, the son of a physician. He attended the prestigious humanistic Wilhelmsgymnasium in Munich and then studied medicine at the Ludwig-Maximilians-Universität München. He passed his state medical examination in 1909, received his license to practice medicine in 1910 and completed his doctorate in medicine in 1911. From July of that year, he worked in the Pathological Institute at the University of Jena. In December 1913, he transferred to the Pathological Institute at the University of Göttingen. He served as a medical officer in the Imperial German Army during the First World War between January 1915 and February 1919. After his discharge from the army, he returned to Göttingen until July 1921. From April 1922 through March 1932, he worked at the Pathological Institute at the Rechts der Isar Hospital in Munich, eventually advancing to the post of Assistant Medical Superintendent.

== Nazi Party career ==
Drawn to German nationalist causes, Boehm from 1921 to 1922 was a member of the Pan-German League and, from 1923, of the Deutsch-Völkischen Offiziersbund (German Ethnic Officers League). He joined the Nazi Party paramilitary organization, the Sturmabteilung (SA) in September 1923. In November 1923, he took part in Adolf Hitler's failed Beer Hall Putsch in Munich, for which he later would be awarded the Blood Order. The Party and the SA were outlawed for over a year but, upon the lifting of the ban, Boehm joined the Party on 24 March 1925 (membership number 120). As a very early Party member, he later would be awarded the Golden Party Badge. He rejoined the SA in 1931 and rose through its ranks, serving in the Supreme SA Leadership and in 1942 attaining the rank of SA-Sanitäts-Gruppenführer (Medical Group Leader).

=== Role in eugenics and racial hygiene ===
Boehm began early to expand his research into racial hygiene. Regarded within the Party as an expert in this field, he served in many positions dealing with race and heredity. He was a founding member and consultant for racial hygiene at the National Socialist German Doctors' League from 1931. From June 1933 through July 1934, he was the scientific director for heredity and race hygiene at the Reich Committee on Public Health in Berlin. He also served on the Expert Advisory Board for Population and Racial Policy in the Ministry of the Interior. From 1 August 1934 to March 1937, he served as the director of the Rudolf Hess Hospital in Dresden (today, the Universitätsklinikum Carl Gustav Carus Dresden). On 19 November 1934, he was appointed honorary professor of racial improvement at the University of Leipzig.

The main focus of Bohme's scientific publishing activities until 1934 was mainly on racial hygiene issues, and he later advanced into the first rank of race hygienists. In March 1937, Boehm was appointed by Reichsärzteführer (Reich Health Leader) Gerhard Wagner as educational director of the Führerschule der Deutschen Ärzteschaft (Leadership School of German Medicine) in Alt Rehse. The focus of Boehm's work was the teaching of genetics and racial improvement. At the same time, Boehm was given the opportunity to set up his own genetic engineering research institute and was one of the few independent experts to compile hereditary biological assessments. The Führerschule was primarily intended to introduce the course participants to the basics of genetics and to indoctrinate them in Nazi ideology on eugenics. The training laid the intellectual foundation and provided the impetus to ensure the "purity of the Aryan race" that ultimately allowed doctors to end a "life unworthy of life" by lethal injection, food deprivation or gas. Many of the physicians who went through the school were later involved in enforcing the Law for the Prevention of Hereditarily Diseased Offspring and in carrying out a program of euthanasia.

Boehm remained in Alt Rehse until just before the outbreak of the Second World War in September 1939. From 1938, he was also an honorary professor at the University of Rostock. From September through December 1939, he served as a camp doctor at an officer's prisoner of war camp in Prenzlau. In January 1940, he returned to Alt Rehse and Rostock and remained there for the next three years. In 1942, Wagner's successor as Reich Health Leader, Leonardo Conti, told Boehm that he no longer saw a future for his hereditary biological research institute as part of the Führerschule. This prompted Boehm to seek an association with a university for his institute, and he accepted an appointment as a professor ordinarius of racial improvement at the University of Giessen from January 1943 until the end of war in May 1945. He was also the co-editor of the journal Der Biologe (The Biologist), which was taken over in 1939 by the Ahnenerbe, an SS-affiliated pseudoscientific association.

== Post-war life ==
After the end of the war, Boehm ran a private medical practice in Giessen. In January and February 1947, Boehm was questioned as part of the investigation into the so-called Doctors' Trial in Nuremberg. In an affidavit dated 28 February 1947, he identified one of the defendants, Karl Brandt, as the "responsible authority" and "leading personality" of the Nazi euthanasia program. He also took the opportunity to register his opposition and objections to the way the program was carried out.

In the 1950s, Boehm's pension claims from the Giessen professorship were rejected by the Hessian State Personnel Office on the grounds that his appointment was invalid due to his close ties to the Nazi regime. The Giessen faculty members defended the legality of the appointment, in which they themselves had participated, and Boehm was granted the post of an emeritus professor of human genetics with full pension benefits. He continued to reside in Giessen until his death in June 1962.

== Sources ==
- "Affidavit of Hermann Boehm Concerning the Administration of the Euthanasia Program". Evidence Code: NO-3059; Item No.:2358: Harvard Law School Library Nuremberg Trials Project. 28 February 1947.
- "Die Führerschule der deutschen Ärzteschaft in Alt Rehse". ns-eugenik.de.
- Klee, Ernst (2007). Das Personenlexikon zum Dritten Reich. Wer war was vor und nach 1945. Frankfurt-am-Main: Fischer-Taschenbuch-Verlag. ISBN 978-3-596-16048-8.
