= People's Romeo =

2010 play by Mukul Ahmed

- Written by: Mukul Ahmed
- Original language: English, Bengali
- Genre: Drama

Premiere
- Date premiered: 6 October 2010

People's Romeo is a play by British playwright Mukul Ahmed based on William Shakespeare's Romeo and Juliet.

== Cast ==
- Delwar Hossain Dilu as Romeo / Narrator
- Caitlin Thorburn as Juliet / Friar Laurence / Tybalt
- Leesa Gazi as Juliet's Nurse / Lady Montague
- Swagata Biswas as percussionist
- Sohini Alam as singer

== Themes ==
Performed in both English and Bengali it blends William Shakespeare's words with Bengali poetry and the Pala Gaan theatrical tradition of song, music, dance and story-telling is used. The original text, alongside modern English, is also used.

== Production ==
The People's Romeo was developed across a two-year period by Wandsworth-based theatre company Tara Arts. The production's name – People's Romeo – reflects the sub-continent's traditions of People's Theatre, where performers tour with a minimum of props and a small cast.

The cast of three actors; Delwar Hossain Dilu, Caitlin Thorburn and Leesa Gazi play multiple roles, transitioning from one character, although the story has been pared down. Characters such as Mercutio and Count Paris have been left out all together. Several important parts have been left out, notably, the reason for Romeo not knowing that Juliet has faked her death was omitted. The company of five also includes singer Sohini Alam joining in traditional and modern Bengali folk songs, and percussionist Swagata Biswas provides us with a live musical score. The set was designed by Sophie Jump's and the lighting designed by Howard Hudson.

== Tour ==
The People's Romeo opened at Greenwich Theatre in September 2010, as part of a UK tour. Prior to a UK tour, it played five performances at TARA Studio ahead of visits to Greenwich, Plymouth, Wolverhampton, Crawley, London's Asia House and Waterman's Hull, Darlington and Birmingham. The show was also staged at Hull Truck Theatre as part of Black History Month.

== Reception ==
Deborah Klayman of The Public Reviews rated People's Romeo it 3/5 called it "is energetic and entertaining with moments that are exciting, moving, and humorous." Matthew Jenkin of News Shopper said, "Both charming and moving, People's Romeo is a brave attempt to try something genuinely new and makes for a culturally enriching and entertaining two hours."

The Stage said, "Director Mukul Ahmed may have taken several liberties with Shakespeare's original but the important elements remain and his cast of five performers, including a percussionist and vocalist create an utterly absorbing piece of theatre. OffWestEnd.com said, "The People's Romeo is a dynamic cross-cultural performance made for our time that uses Pala Gaan, a popular Bengali folk theatre style that combines music, dance and storytelling to re-invent this classic of English theatre.

== See also ==
- Nemesis by Natyaguru Nurul Momen
- Nondito Noroke by Humayun Ahmed
- NityaPurana by Masum Reza
- Che'r Cycle by Mamunur Rashid
- British Bangladeshi
