= Sohini Alam =

British singer of Bangladeshi descent

Sohini Alam সোহিনী আলম
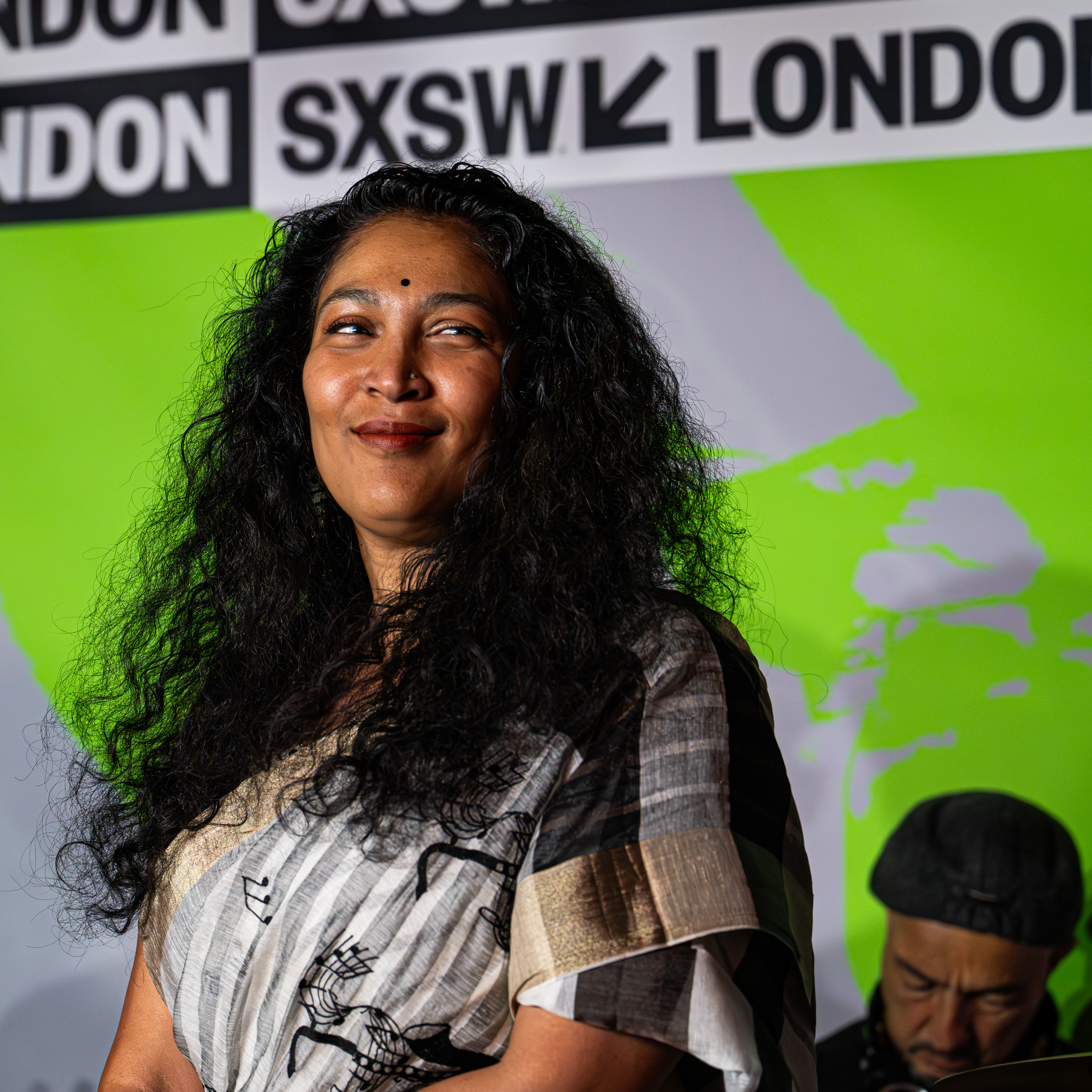
- Performing with Lokkhi Terra at SXSW London, June 2025

Background information
- Born: London, England
- Occupation: Singer
- Instrument: Vocals
- Member of: Khiyo; Lokkhi Terra; Komola Collective; GRRRL

Sohini Alam (Bengali: সোহিনী আলম) is a British singer of Bangladeshi descent who sings in the bands Khiyo, Lokkhi Terra, and GRRRL. She has performed internationally on stage, radio, and television and worked on music for dance, theatre, and film. Alam is a founding member of the arts company Komola Collective and co-music director of the documentary film Rising Silence. After providing vocals for dancer/choreographer Akram Khan's DESH, she spent three years touring internationally with his show Until the Lions.

== Early life ==
Alam was born in London, England and was brought up there and in Dhaka, Bangladesh. She comes from a musical family and was trained by her mother Hiron Alam and by her aunts Jannat Ara and Ferdous Ara, leading Bangladeshi exponents of Nazrul Sangeet. She graduated summa cum laude with a bachelor's degree and a master's degree from Angelo State University in the United States.

== Career ==
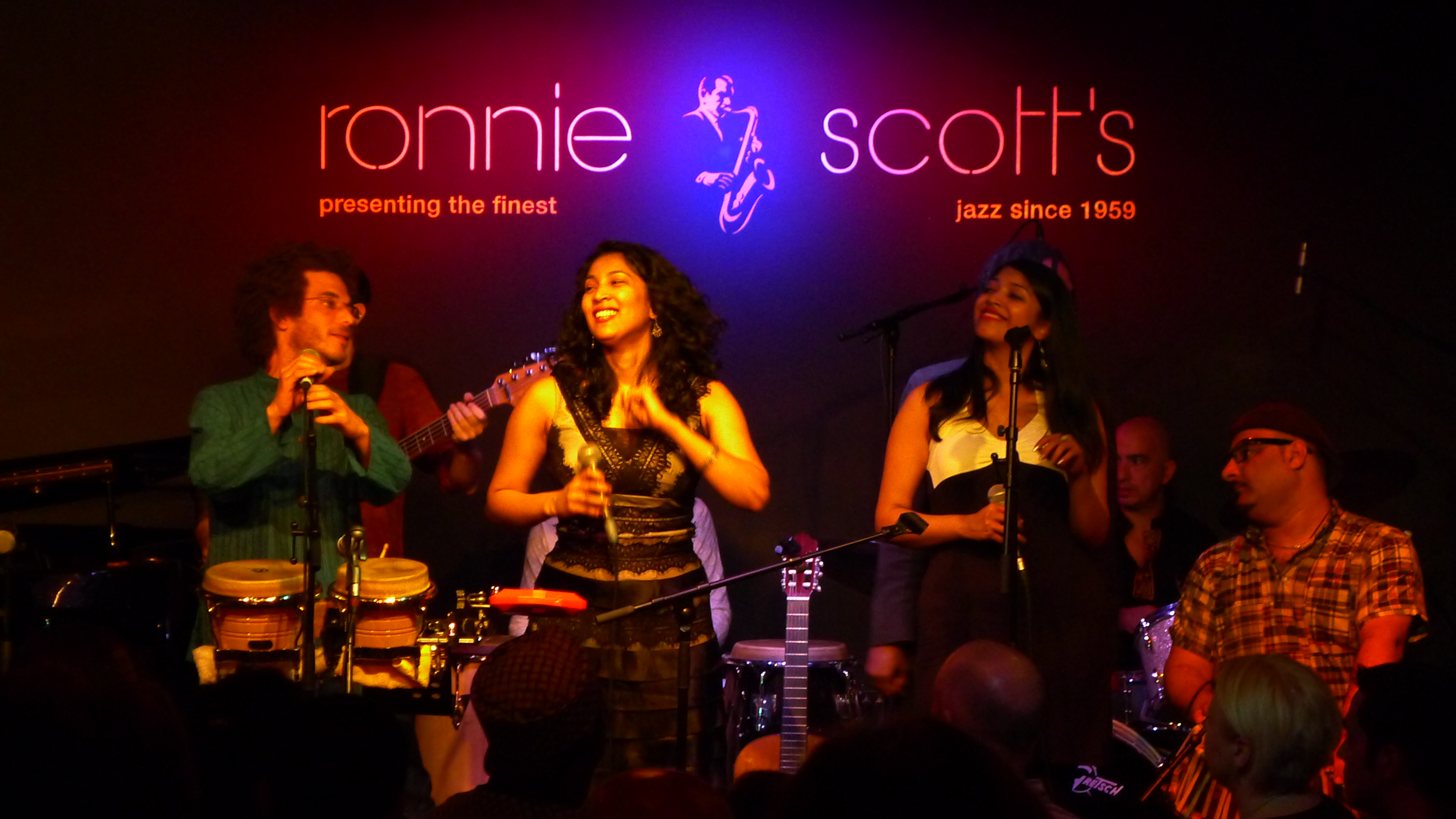
Sohini Alam (2nd from left) on stage at Ronnie Scott's Jazz Club

Alam is trained primarily in Nazrul Sangeet but has since branched out into folk, Rabindra Sangeet and contemporary music. While she sings mainly in Bengali, she has also sung in English, Spanish, Hindi, and Urdu. She sang in Tamil and Roma for a collaboration with the Mongooses Musical Playbox and in Yoruba for Lokkhi Terra's CubAfrobeat collaboration with Dele Sosimi. In Until the Lions, she sang in multiple languages including Tagalog, Azerbaijani, and Old French. In 2018, Alam appeared on the British Bangladeshi Power and Inspiration list of influential British Bangladeshis.

=== Bands ===
As lead singer of Kishon Khan's Afro-Cuban-Bengali band Lokkhi Terra, Alam sang at the closing ceremony of the South Asian Games in Dhaka in 2010 and at the Dhaka World Music Festival in 2011. With Lokkhi Terra, she performed at WOMAD in 2011 and 2015, played twice on the main stage of Ronnie Scott's Jazz Club in Soho, and opened for the Afro-Cuban All Stars at the Barbican Centre in 2012. Alam is featured on Lokkhi Terra's albums, and in a review of Che Guava's Rickshaw Diaries, the world music magazine Songlines wrote: "This good-natured London-based collective are now widely acknowledged as an international force to be reckoned with."

Alam formed the band Khiyo with Oliver Weeks in 2007. Other band members include Ben Heartland. Khiyo gives traditional Bengali music a contemporary London sound. The band's first album received critical acclaim and international radio airplay. Khiyo opened for Shayan Chowdhury Arnob at his 2008 concert in London, organised by human rights charity Drishtipat. Khiyo's first release was its version of Rabindranath Tagore's Amar Shonar Bangla in March 2012. Release of the song's music video in December 2012 made the band national news in most major Bangladeshi newspapers, on TV channels and radio as some of the country's leading musicians began to discuss the band's interpretation of the song, which is also the national anthem of Bangladesh. In April 2013, Khiyo performed at the Southbank Centre's Purcell Room as part of the Alchemy Festival.

In 2016, she was part of Voices of the Revolution. This project was put together by In Place of War (IPOW), a global organisation that supports artistic creativity as a tool for positive change. The following year, IPOW created GRRRL, an electronic music collaboration directed by Laima Leyton. Besides Alam, GRRRL's eclectic mix of influential artists includes Mercury Prize-winning rapper Speech Debelle, Queen of Brazilian Dancehall Lei Di Dai, Zimbabwean rapper AWA, Noella Wiyaala, and electronic artist/synth player Afrodeutsche. GRRRL was voted Best Live Act of Shambala Festival 2017 and performed at the closing celebrations of the 2018 Commonwealth Games in Australia's Gold Coast.

=== Music for dance, film, and theatre ===
Alam worked with composer Jocelyn Pook for Akram Khan, recording vocals for his Olivier Award-winning dance piece DESH. Her work on the DESH soundtrack was reviewed favourably, and she then went on to provide live vocals for composer Vincenzo Lamagna in Khan's show Until the Lions. The celebrated show premiered at the Roundhouse in London in January 2016 before touring internationally. Her other work for dance includes "haunting vocals" for Akademi's Song of the City and The Curse with Kuchipudi dancer Arunima Kumar.

She was co-music director of the documentary film Rising Silence (2018), which told the stories of survivors of sexual violence during the 1971 Bangladesh Liberation War. The film won many awards including 2019 Best Documentary at the Dhaka International Film Festival, 2019 Best Investigation at the UK Asian Media Awards, and 2019 Feature Documentary at the Moondance International Film Festival. She sang for the soundtracks of the films: The Last Thakur (2008) and Life Goes On (2009).

Alam has been involved in several theatre productions as a vocalist, notably:

- Birangona: Women of War, an Offie-nominated Komola Collective production featuring testimonies of the survivors of wartime rape during the Bangladesh War of Independence
- Kanjoos, Hardeep Singh Kohli and Tara Arts' adaptation of Molière's The Miser, which premiered at Tara in 2012 before touring in the UK in 2013
- Dick Whittington Goes Bollywood, Harvey Virdi and Tara Arts' Christmas pantomime, staged at Tara in 2012
- Bollywood Cinderella, Hardeep Singh Kohli and Tara Arts' Christmas pantomime, staged at Tara in 2011
- The People's Romeo, an adaptation of William Shakespeare's Romeo and Juliet, which premiered at Tara in 2010 before touring the UK

Alam was acclaimed for her work in almost every review of each of these four productions. In its review of Dick Whittington Goes Bollywood, the Stage wrote: Alam creates a transcendent soundscape that taps as much into the spirituality as the silliness of this time of year."

UK Theatre Network described her performance in Kanjoos – The Miser: "singer Sohini Alam takes us to a different level as her rich voice encompasses everything from jazz and scat singing and pop to traditional Indian songs."

The Public Reviews wrote of her in Bollywood Cinderella: "the key person in all of this was the singer...Sohini Alam, who sang for every single character as they mimed the words. What a powerful voice and what great use of styles, tone and register."

=== Radio, TV, stage shows, and other collaborations ===
Alam has been featured on BBC Radio a number of times, on programmes such as World on 3, The Verb, Introducing with Tom Robinson, and Woman's Hour. She has also appeared on BBC London and on BBC 5 during their coverage of the London 2012 Olympics.

She has appeared in television programmes in the UK and Bangladesh including The Curry House Kid, a documentary on Akram Khan, on Channel 4 and Khan's episode of Move on Netflix. Her performance with Lokkhi Terra during the South Asian Games was broadcast across South Asia.

As part of the musical group Amra Kojon, she performed in two major concerts in Boston in 2003 and 2008 and in their London show in 2007. In 2010, she performed at the annual Boishakhi Mela, London's biggest celebration of Bengali culture. In 2012, she sang on the album Nari released by the world's largest NGO BRAC. In 2017, Alam performed with Mercury Prize-winning musician Talvin Singh at the Jazz Cafe in London. Alam has collaborated with British-Asian clarinettist Arun Ghosh, worked on an electro-acoustic project After Art, and was collaborating with State of Bengal on a new album until the death of Sam Zaman.

== Personal life ==
In December 2015, Alam married lyricist and guitarist, Asif Asgar Ranjan, of popular Bangladeshi band Arbovirus at Dhaka's Rose Garden Palace.

== Discography ==
Alam is featured on the following albums and compilations:

| Album | Project | Year |
|---|---|---|
| Cubangla | Lokkhi Terra | 2020 |
| Rising Silence | Soundtrack | 2018 |
| Khiyo | Khiyo | 2015 |
| Che Guava's Rickshaw Diaries | Lokkhi Terra | 2012 |
| London's Calling | Lokkhi Terra | 2012 |
| Nari | BRAC | 2012 |
| Desh | Soundtrack | 2011 |
| Life Goes On | Soundtrack | 2010 |
| A Beginner's Guide To India | Lokkhi Terra | 2010 |
| No Visa Required | Lokkhi Terra | 2010 |

== See also ==
- British Bangladeshi
- List of British Bangladeshis
