= Theatre technique =

Theatre techniques facilitate presentation of performances by actors. Improvisational theatre techniques involve spontaneous enactment of stories on the spot.

== The playwright's craft ==
Theatre technique is part of the playwright's creative writing of drama, as a kind of mimesis rather than mere illusion or imitation of life, in that the playwright is able to present a reality to the audience that is different, yet recognisable to that which they usually identify with in their everyday lives.

Another aspect of this is that of creating the kind of dialogue that makes the playwright's characters come alive and allows for their development in the course of his dramatization.

The playwright's art also consists in the ability to convey to the audience the ideas that give essence to the drama within the frame of its structure. Finally, the feeling for the natural divisions of a play—including acts, scenes, and changes of place—its entries and exits, and the positioning of the cast are integral to playwriting technique.

One of the playwright's functions is that concerned with adaptations of existing traditional drama, such as Charles Marowitz’s collages of Hamlet and Macbeth and other re-interpretations of Shakespeare's works, as well as Tom Stoppard’s approaches in Rosencrantz & Guildenstern Are Dead, Dogg's Hamlet, and Cahoot's Macbeth.

== The director’s craft ==
The director these days is responsible for the actual production of a play, as opposed to earlier days when it was the producer who, at least in Britain until the 1950s, had this task. In earlier centuries it was the author, an actor-manager, or a leading actor with whom the responsibilities of staging a drama were invested.

The director produces the play in the way he envisages how it ought to be seen as he interprets what the playwright intended within the drama; he takes care of the effectiveness of the rehearsals of the actors; and coordinates the work of designers and technicians in the production.

However, the playwright's work is still reflected in the director's prompt copy, a separate form of stage instructions worked out in detail by the director, in which each actor is given details as to what is happening onstage, where exactly he has to be in relation to the back, front, left, or right of the stage, and what he is to do at any one time during the play.

== Stage management and stagecraft ==
The stage manager has to work with the director, and ascertain whether both the director's objectives and the perceptions of the stage designers are compatible and realistic. They are usually the link between the director and the rest of the company, and are responsible for the director's visions being passed down to each actor and member of the running crew. They are also responsible for safety and running an orderly backstage area. They maintain the prompt book and the call board, to which rehearsal schedule notes are affixed for the cast.

Stagecraft overall has to address the various shortcomings of the stage's spatial and physical limitations. For example, the stage alone cannot be expected to provide wide and distant vistas, or vast spaces where armies gather or huge masses of people congregate. Natural phenomena such as thunderstorms or winds, that are often part of the drama, cannot be recreated in their original form. Furthermore, because of the distance involved, it is difficult for actors to portray the feelings, tensions and passions of their characters to the audience with much distinctiveness.

It is for these reasons that special technologies and techniques have been developed from classical times onward to supplement and augment the effects that are to be realised. Technical specialists help to implement these techniques by providing expertise in various areas of the production. The stage manager and their team must ultimately draw all these separate techniques together to create an effective and successful stage production.

- Sets and sceneries have to be designed and created in the workshop. They include outdoor and indoor scenes, or special types of constructions, and must also usually achieve the appearance of depth and distance within the spatial limitations of the stage.
- Stage lighting has to be provided to set the moods and sensitivities of the play, and to permit the showing of the emotional charge in the face of the actors, possibly reinforcing the pallor or vividness of their faces.
- Costumes have to typify characters from the moment they appear on stage and signify the period or the social milieu in which the characters are to be seen. They can also indicate the characters' circumstances (whether they should appear rich or poor) or even whether they should be seen as comic or tragic personae.
- Sound effects have to convey natural phenomena, such as wind or storm. However, it is also their function to call forth moods and feelings the audience will recognise.
- Special effects have to deliver the imitations of physical actions on stage, such as explosions, fireworks, fog, or even earthquakes that are often part of the story.
- Rigging is an important aspect that is not often visible. All sound and lighting features and their cabling and wiring have to be held in a safe position, above both the stage and the auditorium, and therefore require specialist temporary and permanent fittings to be installed.
- The technical director, especially in larger theatres, has the responsibility of overseeing the rigging and construction of the stage scenery. They create working drawings from the scenic designer's drawings in order to pass on the designs to the scene shop.

== Trends and movements ==
=== The three unities ===
The Classical unities of time, action and place were the main principles of French neo-classical drama during part of the 17th century.
They were introduced by Jean Mairet after a misreading of Aristotle's Poetics, and the critic Castelvetro insisted that playwrights and directors adhere to the unities. In the Poetics Aristotle had merely recommended that action should consist only of the main plot without any subplots, and that the time represented by action should not stretch beyond the length of one day. Time merely entered into his recommendations as a hint as to the limits of the attention span the audience could be expected to have. The unity of place, that of the confinement of the action in a play to one locality only, was not mentioned at all.
The effect of the three unities on French drama during this period was that their presentation became very restrictive, and it was only when later dramatists began to avoid mentioning specific times and places that the presentation of plays became more creative again.

=== The Fourth Unity ===
In 1944, the Bengal playwright Natyaguru Nurul Momen, introduced the fourth unity in his pioneering tragedy play, Nemesis. In this epoch-making one character play (in other words, Monodrama), Nurul Momen immaculately maintained all the three Aristotelian unities of classical Greek theatre --- and added the fourth unity for the first time in world theatre.

In the preface of Nemesis the Natyaguru wrote, "In this play a fourth Unity is added to the traditional three unities of The Greek Tragedies -- Time, Place & Action. A new experimentation has been done by introducing a new unity --- 'Unity of Person' despite maintaining the format of The three unities."

== Theatre presentation ==
Some dramatists and dramaturgists try to achieve particular effects that are not normally sought in a theatre presentation.

=== Defamiliarization effect (Verfremdungseffekt) ===
Bertolt Brecht coined the term "defamiliarization effect" (sometimes called "estrangement effect" or "alienation effect"; German Verfremdungseffekt) for an approach to theater that focused on the central ideas and decisions in the play, and discouraged involving the audience in an illusory world and in the emotions of the characters. Brecht thought the audience required an emotional distance to reflect on what is being presented. See epic theater.

== Teichoscopy ==
One of the oldest techniques that has been used often, is that of teichoscopy or the "viewing from the wall", in which actors observe events beyond the confines of the stage, such as a distant battle, and discuss it on stage while the battle is taking place, as opposed to the event being reported by messengers at a later time after the event has happened. Shakespeare uses this technique in the final scenes of the play The Tragedy of Julius Caesar.

== See also ==
- Literary technique
- Classical unities
- Theatre
