= Dhaka World Music Festival =

Music festival in Dhaka, Bangladesh

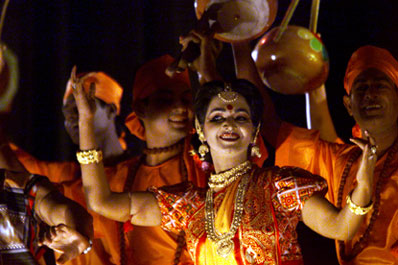
- Genre: World music
- Dates: February
- Locations: Dhaka, Bangladesh
- Years active: 2011-2019
- Founded: 2011
- Patrons: Grameenphone; Culturepot Global

The Dhaka World Music Festival, also referred to as Dhaka World Music Fest, is an international music festival held in Dhaka, Bangladesh, featuring national and international musicians from different genres. The festival covers an extensive scope of performances from local folk and traditional music genres to world fusion and contemporary world music across the globe.

== Making ==
Inspired by the socio-political impact of music through the Concert for Bangladesh, Runi Khan (the founder of Culturepot Global, a UK based cross-cultural event management organization) intended to stage a major event that would remark the 40th anniversary of the concert. Believing Bangladesh to be absent in the global cultural scene, she wanted to bring attention to Bangladeshi music, where Bangladeshi artists could display their culture. Farhan Quddus, head of Excalibur Entertainment, Bangladesh, who was also planning to hold an annual world music programme, joined her. Around the same time, the Bangladesh telecommunication giant, Grameenphone, was looking for events that would emphasize the celebration of International Mother Language Day on February 21. The company agreed with the idea of having a festival where musicians from all over the world could showcase traditional music in their mother tongues. The idea also had the potential of marking Dhaka as a global cultural city.

Kishon Khan, a London-based British Bangladeshi pianist and composer and band leader of Lokkhi Terra, took on the role of Music Director. His relationships with other internationally acclaimed musicians allowed him to draw in exponents of African and Latin music. Another British Bangladeshi musician, Idris Rahman, also played an important role in interacting with some world-reputed bands and musicians to perform at the event. The event began on 4–5 February 2011.

== Events ==
The inaugural edition of the festival took place in 2011 at Sultana Kamal Mohila Krira Complex, in Dhanmondi. It was jointly organized by Culturepot Global UK, Jatrik Travels, Excalibur Entertainment and Symbiance Partners and sponsored by Grameenphone. International music artists like Tunde Jegede, Dele Sosimi, Julia Biel and others, along with local stars like Ajob, Porobashi, Band Lalon, Shah Jahan Munshi, Rob Fakir and others, performed in the event. The Festival ended with a grand finale where all eight bands came together on stage. The event proved to be successful, being popular in Bangladesh.

Subsequent editions were held till 2019. A later edition for January 2025 was postponed.
