= Birangona: Women of War =

Play written by Leesa Gazi

- Promotional poster
- Written by: Leesa Gazi; Samina Luthfa

Premiere
- Date: 1 March 2014

Birangona: Women of War is a British one-act play by Leesa Gazi about the untold true stories of female survivors and sufferers, Birangona, of the Bangladesh Liberation War, during which over 200,000 women were raped and tortured. The theatrical production is dedicated to narrating the stories of war heroines from their perspective.

== Cast ==
- Leesa Gazi as Moroyom
- Amith Rahman as multiple shadow characters
- Director: Filiz Ozcan
- Designer and illustrator: Caitlin Abbott
- Lighting designer (English version): Salvatore Scollo
- Lighting designer (Bengali version): Nasirul Haque Khokon
- Videographer: Fahmida Islam
- Sound design: Ahsan Reza Khan
- Artwork: Caitlin Abbott (from an original photo by Naib Uddin Ahmed)
- Producer: Buffy Sharpe for Komola Collective
- Vocals: Sohini Alam
- Voice artist: Faisal Gazi
- Original poem: Tarfia Faizullah

== Development ==
"My play gives a voice to the many thousands of women systematically raped and tortured. Society rejected these women, silenced their stories and denied their existence.

The stigma of rape and collective shame was so huge in a socially conservative society. These women could not disclose the attacks they had suffered, and if they tried they were treated with contempt by their own people.

The play is not only culturally important but also educationally important. These Birangona Women are elderly and dying now, and when they die their stories die with them.

They have been silenced for too long – it's important the world hears their stories now."

— Leesa Gazi, actress in and writer of Birangona: Women of War

Birangona: Women of War was based on the concept and research by Leesa Gazi, who is also the central actor as well as one of the playwrights of the play. In 2010, Gazi met 21 Birangona women in Sirajganj, Bangladesh and filmed their accounts.

In August 2013, Gazi went back to the women with her theatre company Komola Collective, a London-based theatre and arts company,. to develop an R&D theatrical piece based on their testimonies. Their accounts were interwoven into the play. The play is the Komola Collective's debut production.

== Production ==
Birangona: Women of War is directed by Filiz Ozcan and written by Samina Lutfa and Leesa Gazi.

== Tour ==
An R&D show of Birangona: Women of War was held in Dhaka to get feedback from a select audience in 2013.

The production was first staged by Komola Collective in Dhaka at the Liberation War Museum in March 2014. The play premiered in London on 9 April of the same year.

Shows of the production were staged at the Gulshan Club, Central Shaheed Minar, the National Museum Auditorium, the Experimental Theatre Hall of Bangladesh Shilpakala Academy, the Mansur Hall in Sirajgonj and at the Theatre Institute Chattagram in December 2014.

== Awards ==
Birangona: Women of War was nominated for an Offie for play in the productions that defy traditional categories.

== Reception ==
Redhotcurry.com said, "'Birangona: Women of War' production gives a powerful and necessary platform to the many hundreds of thousands of women systematically raped and tortured during that time." Akram Khan said, "The play is not only culturally important but also educationally important - revealing atrocities which have been swept aside over the course of history."

Christopher Hong of The Public Reviews rated the play 3.5/5 and said, "...it does not apportion blame but simply focuses on telling the stories as they are achieving what it sets out to do."

Saurav Dey of The Daily Star said, "The 60-minute play is powerful; no artificial or unnecessary elements distracted the audience at any point in the performance. More such productions need to be staged across different parts of the country so that Birangonas get their due honour. Komola Collective certainly deserves a tip of the hat for bringing forth the ignored part of history in the form of a piece of art."

Tahmima Anam of The Guardian called it "A powerful new play... groundbreaking production." The Stage called it "...an illuminating and affecting piece." Daniel Nelson of One World said, "It is an intelligently conceived and executed tale."

== See also ==
- Rape during the Bangladesh Liberation War
- Nemesis by Natyaguru Nurul Momen
- Nondito Noroke by Humayun Ahmed
- NityaPurana by Masum Reza
- Che'r Cycle by Mamunur Rashid
