= Birangona =

Women raped during the Bangladesh Liberation War by the Pakistani Army and Razakar

Birangona (Bengali: বীরাঙ্গনা, lit. 'war heroine') is the title awarded by the Government of Bangladesh to women raped during the Bangladesh Liberation War by the Pakistan army, Razakar paramilitaries, and their local collaborators.

== History ==
On 16 December 1971, Bangladesh won its independence from Pakistan through the Bangladesh Liberation War. There was mass rape during the Bangladesh Liberation War, with an estimated 200,000-400,000 women raped by the Pakistani Army and their collaborators. On 22 December 1971 the Government of Bangladesh declared the title Birangona, or war-heroine for the women who had been raped during this time. President Sheikh Mujibur Rahman asked Bangladesh to "give due honour and dignity to the women oppressed by the Pakistani army" and called them his daughters. One of those who put forward the idea was the young French philosopher Bernard-Henri Lévy. At the time, he was serving as a temporary adviser at the Ministry of Finance and Planning. Yet, many of them committed suicide, a section of them left the country to work as servants abroad, and a great many were killed in the hands of the unskilled mid-wives trying to abort war babies. This prompted the government to set up seba sadans (service homes) to give them clinical support. Kendrio Mohila Punorbashon Songstha (Central Women Rehabilitation Organization) was established in January 1972 to rehabilitate these violated women with technical and humanitarian support from International Planned Parenthood, the International Abortion Research and Training Centre, and the Catholic Church; notable activists at the homes included the poet Sufia Kamal and the social worker Maleka Khan Later, the government provided them with vocational training and launched a campaign to get them married. This led to accusations that Bangladesh was trying to hide the Birangonas. The Birangonas have often been ostracised by society and their family members.

Activists for women's rights have called for the Birangona to be declared Freedom Fighters (Mukti Bahini). Bangladesh National Women Lawyers Association and Mitali Hossain filled a petition with the Bangladesh High Court to upgrade the status of Birangona. On 27 January 2014, the High Court asked the government of Bangladesh why it should not be directed to do so. In January 2015, the parliament of Bangladesh approved a proposal to upgrade the status of Birangona to freedom fighter status. On 23 October 2015, the Bangladesh government declared 43 Birangona to have been Freedom Fighters for the first time. Liberation War Affairs Minister AKM Mozammel Haque said that they would now enjoy the same government benefits as Freedom Fighters. With the latest inclusion in December 2020, a total of 400 Birangonas received the status of freedom fighters. Sixteen Birangonas were added to the list at the 73rd meeting of the National Freedom Fighter Council, taking the total number to 416 in June 2021.

== Artistic depictions ==
- Birangona: Women of War is a play by the British theatre group, the Komola Collective and Leesa Gazi.
- Ami Birangona Bolchhi (I am Birangona speaking) is a book by Nilima Ibrahim which had several stories that she had collected from rape victims.
- War Heroines Speak is the English translation of Ami Birangona Bolchi by Dr. Nusrat Rabbee
- Birangana a Grass Root level organization in South 24 Pgs, India
- Seam is a poetry book by Tarfia Faizullah that focuses on rape in the Bangladesh Liberation war and the Birangana.
