= Oliver Weeks =

English composer

Oliver Weeks (born in Gloucester, Gloucestershire) is an English composer, arranger, and guitarist.

== Early life and education ==
Weeks grew up in Frome, Somerset, and developed an early interest in classical music and '50s and '60s rock 'n' roll. He attended Frome Community College and then Clare College, Cambridge, where he read music and received a starred First.

A school visit to Kolkata in 1996 led to a deep engagement with Bengali poetry and music. Weeks wrote his undergraduate dissertation on baul music and Rabindra Sangeet. He also created classical works based on original Bengali source material. He remained at Cambridge to complete an MPhil under Robin Holloway, and subsequently received his PhD in composition from the Royal Academy of Music, London, studying with Simon Bainbridge and Philip Cashian.

== Career ==
=== Compositions ===
Orchestras and ensembles who have performed his work include the London Philharmonic Orchestra, the Philharmonia, the ensemble Endymion, the Royal Academy Soloists, and the City of London Sinfonia.

=== Non-classical work and collaborations ===
After fieldwork on the Baul musicians (mystic poets and singers) of Bengal, Weeks collaborated with the Bengali singer Moushumi Bhowmik to form the syncretic group Parapar. He also plays in the instrumental metal band Astrohenge and formed the band Khiyo with singer Sohini Alam in 2007.
