= Classical unities =

16–19th-century prescriptive theory of dramatic tragedy

The classical unities, Aristotelian unities, or three unities represent a prescriptive theory of dramatic tragedy that was introduced in Italy in the 16th century and was influential for three centuries. The three unities are:

1. unity of action: a tragedy should have one principal action.
2. unity of time: the action in a tragedy should occur over a period of no more than 24 hours.
3. unity of place: a tragedy should exist in a single physical location.

== History ==
=== Italy ===
In 1514, author and critic Gian Giorgio Trissino (1478–1550) introduced the concept of the unities in his blank-verse tragedy, Sofonisba. Trissino claimed he was following Aristotle. However, Trissino had no access to Aristotle's most significant work on the tragic form, Poetics. Trissino expanded with his own ideas on what he was able to glean from Aristotle's book, Rhetoric. In Rhetoric Aristotle considers the dramatic elements of action and time, while focusing on audience reception. Poor translations at the time resulted in some misreadings by Trissino.

Trissino's play Sofonisba followed classical Greek style by adhering to the unities, by omitting the usual act division, and even introducing a chorus. The many Italian playwrights that came after Trissino in the 16th century, also wrote in accordance to the unities. However, according to The Cambridge Guide to Theatre, the imitation of classical forms and modes had a deadening effect on Italian drama, which became "rhetorical and inert". None of the 16th century tragedies that were influenced by the rediscovery of ancient literature have survived except as historic examples. One of the best is Pietro Aretino's Orazia (1546), which nevertheless is found to be stiff, distant and lacking in feeling.

In 1570 the unities were codified and given a new definition by Lodovico Castelvetro (c. 1505–1571) in his influential translation and interpretation of Aristotle's Poetics, Poetica d'Aristotele vulgarizzata e sposta ("The Poetics of Aristotle translated in the Vulgar Language and commented on"). Though Castelvetro's translations are considered crude and inaccurate, and though he at times altered Aristotle's meanings to make his own points, his translations were influential and inspired the vast number of scholarly debates and discussions that followed all through Europe.

=== France ===
One hundred and twenty years after Sofonisba introduced the theory to Italy, it then introduced the concept once again, this time in France with a translation by Jean Mairet. Voltaire said that the Sophonisba of Mairet had "a merit which was then entirely new in France, — that of being in accordance with the rules of the theatre. The three unities of action, time, and place are there strictly observed, and the author was regarded as the father of the French stage." The new rules caught on very quickly in France. Dramatist Pierre Corneille became an ardent supporter of them, and in his plays from Le Cid (1636) to Suréna (1674) he attempted to keep within the limits of time and place. In 1655 he published his Trois Discours, which includes his arguments for the unities. Corneille's principles drew the support of Racine and Voltaire, and for French playwrights they became hard rules, and a heresy to disobey them. Voltaire said:

All nations begin to regard as barbarous those times when even the greatest geniuses, such as Lope de Vega and Shakespeare, were ignorant of this system, and they even confess the obligation they are under to us for having rescued them from this barbarism. . . . The fact that Corneille, Racine, Molière, Addison, Congreve, and Maffei have all observed the laws of the stage, that ought to be enough to restrain any one who should entertain the idea of violating them.

However, in France opposition soon began to grow in the form of the Romantic movement, that wanted freedom from the strictures of the classical unities. It turned into a fierce literary conflict. The opposition included Victor Hugo, Alexandre Dumas, and others. Hugo, in the preface to his play, Cromwell, criticizes the unities, saying in part,

Distinguished contemporaries, foreigners and Frenchmen, have already attacked, both in theory and in practice, that fundamental law of the pseudo-Aristotelian code. Indeed, the combat was not likely to be a long one. At the first blow it cracked, so worm-eaten was that timber of the old scholastic hovel!

Hugo ridicules the unities of place and time, but not the unity of action, which he considers "true and well founded". The conflict came to a climax with the production of Victor Hugo's play Hernani at the Theatre Francais, on 21 February 1830. It was reported that the two sides, the "Classicists" and "Romanticists", both full of passion, met as on a field of battle. There was a lot of clamor in the theatre at each performance, even some fist fights. The newer Romantic movement carried the day, and French playwrights no longer had to confine their plays to one location, and have all of the action packed into one day.

=== England ===
The Classical Unities seem to have had less impact in England. It had adherents in Ben Jonson and John Dryden. Examples of plays that followed the theory include: Thomas Otway's Venice Preserv'd (1682), Joseph Addison's Cato, and Samuel Johnson's Irene (1749). Shakespeare's The Tempest (1610) takes place almost entirely on an island, during the course of four hours, and with one major action—that of Prospero reclaiming his role as the Duke of Milan. It is suggested that Prospero's way of regularly checking the time of day during the play might be satirizing the concept of the unities. In An Apology for Poetry (1595), Philip Sidney advocates for the unities, and complains that English plays are ignoring them. In Shakespeare's The Winter's Tale the chorus notes that the story makes a jump of 16 years:

Impute it not a crime
To me or my swift passage, that I slide
O'er sixteen years and leave the growth untried
Of that wide gap

John Dryden discusses the unity of time in this passage criticizing Shakespeare's history plays:

... they are rather so many Chronicles of Kings, or the business many times of thirty or forty years, crampt into a representation of two hours and a half, which is not to imitate or paint Nature, but rather to draw her in miniature, to take her in little; to look upon her through the wrong end of a Perspective, and receive her Images not onely much less, but infinitely more imperfect then the life: this instead of making a Play delightful, renders it ridiculous.

Samuel Johnson in the preface to his edition of Shakespeare in 1773 rejects the previous dogma of the classical unities and argues that drama should be faithful to life:

The unities of time and place are not essential to a just drama, and that though they may sometimes conduce to pleasure, they are always to be sacrificed to the nobler beauties of variety and instruction; and that a play written with nice observation of the critical rules is to be contemplated as an elaborate curiosity, as the product of superfluous and ostentatious art, by which is shown rather what is possible than what is necessary.

After Johnson's critique interest seemed to turn away from the theory.

John Pitcher, in the Arden Shakespeare Third Series edition of The Winter's Tale (2010), suggests that Shakespeare was familiar with the unities due to an English translation of Poetics that became popular around 1608.

== Excerpts of Aristotle's Poetics ==
Aristotle's Poetics may not have been available to Trissino when he formulated the unities, and the term "Aristotelian unities" is considered a misnomer, but in spite of this, Aristotle's name became attached to the theory from the beginning. As translations became available, theorists have looked to the Poetics retrospectively for support of the concept. In these passages from the Poetics, Aristotle considers action:

Tragedy, then is a process of imitating an action which has serious implications, is complete, and possesses magnitude. ...A poetic imitation, then, ought to be unified in the same way as a single imitation in any other mimetic field, by having a single object: since the plot is an imitation of an action, the latter ought to be both unified and complete, and the component events ought to be so firmly compacted that if any one of them is shifted to another place, or removed, the whole is loosened up and dislocated; for an element whose addition or subtraction makes no perceptible extra difference is not really a part of the whole.

Aristotle considers length of time in a distinction between the epic and tragedy:

Well then, epic poetry followed in the wake of tragedy up to the point of being a (1) good-sized (2) imitation (3) in verse (4) of people who are to be taken seriously; but in its having its verse unmixed with any other and being narrative in character, there they differ. Further, so far as its length is concerned tragedy tries as hard as it can to exist during a single daylight period, or to vary but little, while the epic is not limited in its time and so differs in that respect.

== See also ==
- History of theatre
- Theatre technique
- List of narrative techniques
