= Khiyo =

English fusion band of British and Bengali descent

Khiyo ক্ষ
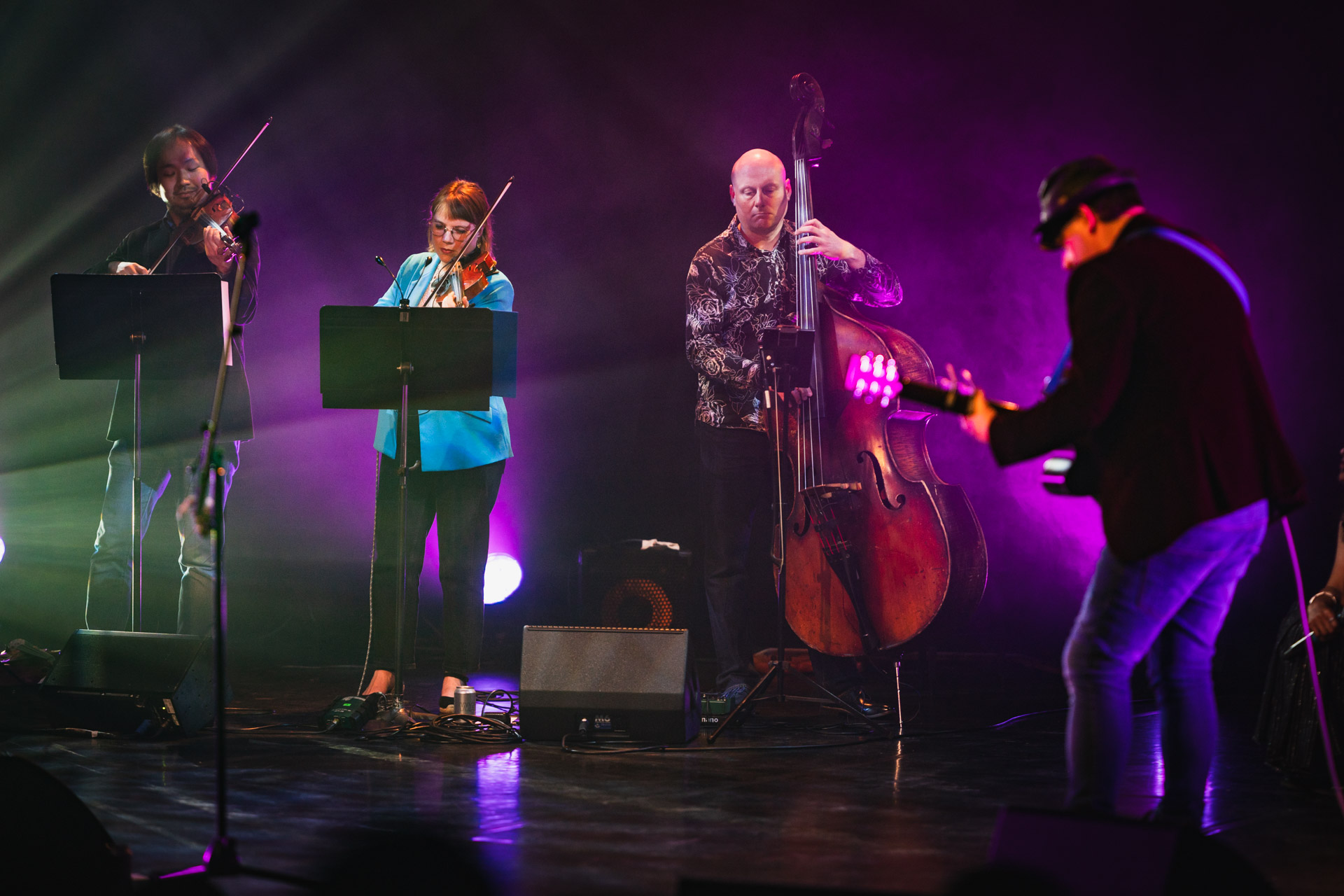
- in 2024 (by Paul Hudson)

Background information
- Origin: London, England
- Genres: Classical; rock; jazz; blues; Nazrul Sangeet; Rabindra Sangeet; Bengali folk; Indian classical
- Years active: 2007–present
- Label: ARC Music
- Members: Oliver Weeks; Sohini Alam; Ben Heartland; Hassan Mohyeddin (guest); Derek Scurll (guest); Danyal Dhondy (guest)
- Website: khiyo.com

Khiyo (Bengali: ক্ষ) are an English fusion band of British and Bengali descent formed in London, England in 2007. The three core members of Khiyo are Sohini Alam on vocals, Oliver Weeks on guitar and piano, and Ben Heartland on bass.

== History ==
Khiyo is named after a letter of the Bengali alphabet, the 'Khiyo'. It is a unique letter that, whilst being a combination of two letters, has an identity of its own. The name reflects the band's members drawing on different musical backgrounds, amalgamating into a singularly identifiable sound. Alam met Weeks in 2007 when she was understudy for the Bengali singer Mousumi Bhowmik, with whom Weeks was working in the band Parapar. They later brought in Weeks' friend Heartland, who he knew from studying together at Cambridge University.

== Style ==
The band combines and mixes interpretations of traditional Bangladeshi songs with original modern arrangements. They draw influence from classical, rock, jazz, blues, Nazrul Sangeet, Rabindra Sangeet, Bengali folk and Indian classical.

== Recording and performances ==
In December 2012, Khiyo released the music video for its version of Rabindranath Tagore's song "Amar Sonar Bangla". In September 2013, they headlined at the Purcell Room as part of the Southbank Centre's Alchemy festival.

In August 2014, the band self-released their Khiyo|self-titled debut album with a launch at the Forge in Camden Town, London. The album (which was recorded over seven years) combines grungy rhythm-section and acoustic guitars to classic Bangladeshi melodies. In September of the same year, they performed songs from their album live on BBC Asian Network, hosted by Nadia Ali. In August 2015, the album was re-launched by ARC Music.

== Discography ==
=== Albums ===
Title	Album details	Peak chart positions	Certifications
Khiyo	Released: 28 August 2015; Label: ARC Music; Formats: CD, Digital Download		

== See also ==
- British Bangladeshi
- List of British Bangladeshis
