= Mahesh Elkunchwar =

Indian dramatist

- Born: 9 October 1939 (age 86); Parwa, Maharashtra
- Occupation: Playwright
- Known for: Yugant; Party; Holi; Sonata; Wada chirebandi Magna Talyakathi; Maunraag

Mahesh Elkunchwar (born 9 October 1939) is an Marathi playwright, screenwriter and actor. In addition to the over 20 plays he has written, Elkunchwar has also authored theoretical writings and critical works.

He is credited as one of the most influential and progressive playwrights not only just in Marathi theatre, but also in Indian theatre. In 2014, he was awarded the Sangeet Natak Akademi Fellowship.

== Early life and education ==
Born to a 9th generation Telugu Brahmin migrant family in the Vidarbha region of Maharashtra, Elkunchwar left home at the age of four to be raised outside of Indian urban centres. As films and theatre were taboo in his family, he saw his first play when he moved to Nagpur for his matriculation.

He studied at Morris College, and went on to do a Master of Arts in English at Nagpur University. While still in college, he saw veteran theatre director Vijaya Mehta's production of Vijay Tendulkar's Mee jinkalo mee Haralo (I Won, I Lost) in 1965. Deeply influenced by the play, he went to watch the play again the following day and decided to begin writing plays himself. He devoted the next year to reading plays of all kind.

== Career ==
He taught English literature at Dharampeth Arts, Commerce College, Nagpur and M. P. Deo Memorial Science College, Nagpur, until retiring as its Head in 1999. He was a guest professor of screen play-writing at the Film and Television Institute, Pune in 2000–2001. He taught as a visiting professor at the National school of Drama, New Delhi for a number of years.

Elkunchwar has experimented with many forms of dramatic expression, ranging from the realistic to symbolic, expressionist to absurd theatre with theme ranging from creativity to life, sterility to death and has influenced modern Indian theatre for more than three decades. Elkunchwar emerged onto the national theatre scene with the publication of his one-act play Sultan in 1967 in noted literary magazine Satyakatha. This play was immediately noticed by Vijaya Mehta; she went on to direct four of his early plays, including Holi and Sultan in 1969 and 1970 for Rangayan. A number of commercial hits followed such as Holi (1969), Raktapushpa (1971), Party (1972), Virasat (1982), and Atamkatha (1987).

Considered a successor to Vijay Tendulkar, Elkunchwar's plays are written in Marathi, the Indian language that is spoken by approximately 90 million people. The plays have been subsequently translated into multiple Indian and Western languages (including English, French and German).

In 1984, his play Holi was made into the film Holi by Ketan Mehta, for which he wrote the screenplay. In the same year, Govind Nihalani directed a film, Party, based on his eponymous play. Sonata (2017), a film starring Aparna Sen, Shabana Azmi and Lilette Dubey was based on Elkunchwar's eponymous play.

Elkunchwar has also written essays, collected in a volume titled Maunraag. The collection has been noted for its contributions to the genre and was cited as the book of the decade in 2012. The essays combine autobiographical and meditative elements.

In 2026, Elkunchwar's play Eka Natacha Mrityu, written in 2005, received its first stage production after remaining unstaged for over two decades. Directed by Atul Pethe and featuring Abhay Mahajan in the title role, the production premiered at The Box in Pune from 9 to 12 July 2026, with Elkunchwar in attendance. It was subsequently presented from 24 to 26 July 2026 as the inaugural production at the newly established Rangmandap theatre in Nagpur.

== Works ==
=== Plays ===
- Rudravarsha (The Savage Year), 1966
- Holi (one act)
- Sultan (one act), 1967
- Zumbar (one act), 1967
- Eka Mhatarachya Khoon (An Old Man's Murder; one act), 1968
- Kaifiyat (one act), 1967
- Ek Osad Gaon (one act), 1969
- Yatanaghar (The Chamber of Anguish), 1970
- Garbo, 1970
- Raktapushpa (Flowers of Blood), 1971
- Vasanakand (The Episode of Lust), 1972
- Party, 1976
- Wada Chirebandi (Old Stone Mansion), 1985
- Pratibimb (Reflection), 1987
- Atmakatha (Autobiography), 1988
- Magna Talyakathi (The Pond), 1991
- Yuganta (The End of an Epoch/Apocalypse), 1994
- Wasansi Jeernani (Tattered Clothes), 1995
- Dharmaputra (Godson), 1998
- Sonata, 2000
- Eka Natacha Mrityu (An Actor's Death), 2005

=== Other works ===
- Maunraag: collection of essays, Mouj Prakashan
- Paschimprabha: collection of essays, Chakshu prakashan
- Baatcheet: Interviews, Rajhans Prakashan
- Saptak: lectures, Rajhans prakashan
- Tribandh: Three essays, Mouj Prakashan
- Vinashavela (translation), Mouj Prakashan

=== Translated works ===
- Manjula Padmanabhan
- The Wada Trilogy, published by Seagull Books in 2004 ISBN 978-81-7046-159-3
- Collected Plays of Mahesh Elkunchwar Volume I. Oxford University Press, 2008
- Collected Plays of Mahesh Elkunchwar Volume II. Oxford University Press, 2011

== Awards and recognition ==
- Sangeet Natak Academi Award, 1989
- Nandikar, 1989
- Maharashtra Gaurav, 1990
- Maharashtra Foundation for "Yugant”, 1997
- Sahitya Akademi Award for his Trilogy Yugant
- Saraswati Samman, 2002
- Janasthan, 2011
- Brittingham Visiting Scholar, University of Wisconsin, Madison, USA, 2005
- Sangeet Natak Akademi Fellowship, 2013
- Kalidas Samman, 2014-2015
- Go. Ni. Dandekar Puraskar, 2016
- Vinda Karandikar Jeevan Gaurav Puraskar, 2018
