= Kishon Khan =

Bangladeshi-British jazz pianist, composer, arranger and music producer (born 1970)

Kishon Khan কীশোন খান
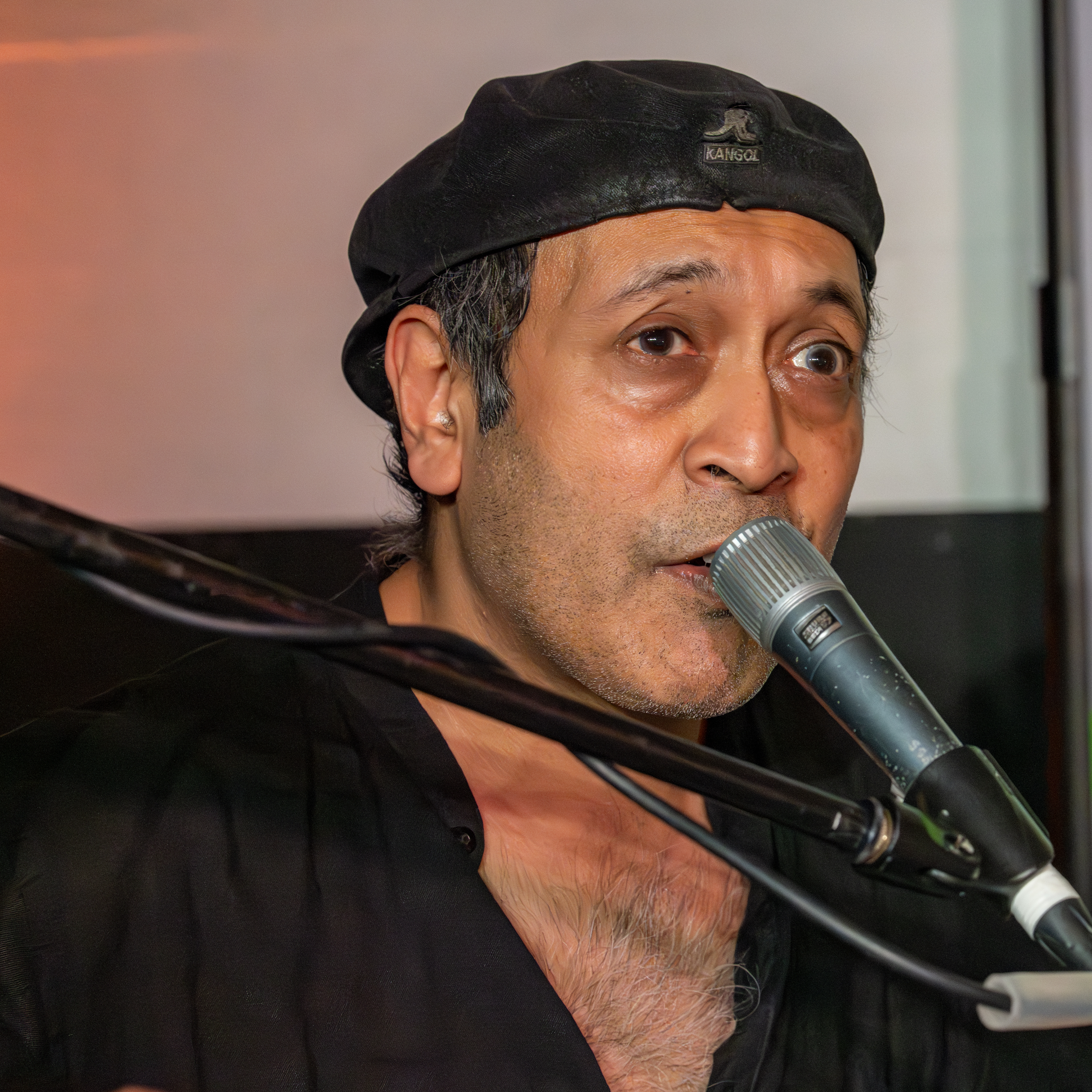
- Performing with Lokkhi Terra at SXSW London, June 2025

Background information
- Born: 1 August 1970 (age 56); Bangladesh
- Origin: London, England
- Genres: Afro-Cuban; Jazz
- Occupations: Pianist; composer; arranger; music producer
- Instrument: Piano
- Years active: 1999–present

Kishon Khan (Bengali: কীশোন খান; born 1 August 1970) is a Bangladeshi-born British award-winning jazz pianist, composer, arrangermusic producer, and Professor of Practise at the SOAS University of London

== Early life ==
Khan grew up in North London and was classically trained in piano from age 4, but turned to jazz as a teenager. After graduating from the University of East Anglia, Khan travelled to Cuba, where he ultimately lived on and off. In Cuba, Khan became interested in Afro-Cuban music, stating in an interview that musical dialogue between countries can be ‘truly incredible’. He noted that Cuban bass player Enrique Diaz was a critical inspiration for him, as Diaz and Khan would work together to combine African, South Asian, and Cuban musical traditions.

== Career ==
Khan has worked as a bandleader, composer, and arranger for various groups, as well as being an in-demand session pianist in London.

In 1999, Khan set up the Afro-Cuban funk jazz band Motimba, representing a fusion of the newly developing musical movement of ‘Timba’ in Cuba as well as the London-based Latin music scene. The lineup of Motimba included Justin Thurgur (trombone), Graeme Flowers (trumpet), Oreste Noda (percussion), Jimmy Martinez (bass), Javier Camillo (vocals), Phil Dawson (guitar), and Tansay Ibrahim (drums). The quick popularity of Motimba led the band to be signed by the independent French label, Iris Music, and the release of their first album, Monkey Vibrations, in 2003. The band was described by Straight No Chaser Magazine as ‘ground-breaking’. Motimba’s notable gigs included supporting the Spanish Harlem Orchestra and the Gipsy Kings.

In 2006, Khan established the critically acclaimed world music group, Lokkhi Terra. Fusing Bangladeshi music traditions with those from Africa and Latin America, Songlines magazine described Lokkhi Terra as ‘the world’s best Afrobeat-Cuban-Bangladeshi group’. A few members of the Motimba crew also play for Lokkhi Terra; in addition, the band features the Bengali vocalists Sohini Alam, Aanon Siddiqua and Aneire Khan. After playing its first gig in 2006 at London’s Queen Elizabeth Hall, Lokkhi Terra have performed at WOMAD, Ronnie Scott's, Barbican Centre, and the opening ceremony of the South Asian Games amongst other venues.

In 2010, Lokkhi Terra released their debut album, No Visa Required. This album was produced by Funkiwala Records, a label established by Khan with composer and trombonist Justin Thurgur in the same year. In 2012, they released their second album, Che Guava’s Rickshaw Diaries, which received widespread critical acclaim. The Sunday Times Magazine wrote of the album that ‘the multicultural settings effortlessly encapsulate 21st-century London’. The band have since released two EPs and two studio albums: Bangla Rasta (2016), Introducing Baby Akhtar: Lokkhi Terra meets Shikor Bangladesh All Stars (2017), CUBAFROBEAT: Lokkhi Terra meets Dele Sosimi (2018), and CUBANGLA (2020). Founder and presenter of BBC Radio 2’s Viva Latino, John Armstrong, wrote that CUBANGLA was ‘their crowning glory to date… as well as being one of the outstanding albums of the year so far for me". In 2022, Lokkhi Terra released a single, ‘Kande Revisited’, a reworking of a Bangla folk song which was initially released in their debut album.

Forming out of the album CUBAFROBEAT, the collaboration between Lokkhi Terra and Dele Sosimi evolved into an independent group by the same name, CubAfrobeat. The band released their first single, ‘Eni Agee’, in 2022.

Khan’s other contemporary collaborations include the Soothsayers, a London-based Afrobeat and reggae-influenced band, and Gilles Peterson’s Havana Cultura, a collection of hand-picked Latin productions.

== Discography ==
=== Albums ===
- Motimba, Monkey Vibrations (2003)
- Dadi, Dadi (2007)
- Kingpin, Out The Box (2010)
  - Tracks 1, 5, and 14
- Lokkhi Terra, No Visa Required (2010)
- Lokkhi Terra, Che Guava’s Rickshaw Diaries (2012)
- Various, London’s Calling (2012)
  - Tracks 3 and 4
- Bukky Leo & Black Egypt, Anarchy (2012)
- Cornell Campbell Meets Soothsayers, Nothing Can Stop Us (2013)
- Justin Thurgur, No Confusion (2016)
- Shikor Bangladesh All Stars, Soul of Bengal (2017)
- Bukky Leo & Black Egypt, Tribute To Fela (2017)
- Lokkhi Terra, CUBAFROBEAT: Lokkhi Terra meets Dele Sosimi (2018)
- Lokkhi Terra, CUBANGLA (2020)
- Justin Thugur, Many Faces (2022)
  - Tracks 1, 3, 4, 5
- Eparapo, Take To The Streets (2023)
  - Tracks A1, A2, and B3

=== EPs ===
- Lokkhi Terra, Bangla Rasta (2016)
- Lokkhi Terra, Introducing Baby Akhtar: Lokkhi Terra meets Shikor Bangladesh All Stars (2017)
- Cornell Campbell Meets Soothsayers, Ode To Joy (Babylon Can't Control I) (2019)
- Telephone Man, Angel (2022)

=== Singles ===
- Bukky Leo & Black Egypt, ‘Dem Go Shout’ (2005)
- Free Hold Negro, ‘Guaguanco Pa'l Bruce’ (2001)
- Lokkhi Terra, ‘Kande Revisited’ (2012)
- Nick Smart’s Trogon, ‘Todi or Not Todi’ (2013)
- Justin Thurgur, ‘NuOracle’ (2018)
- CubAfrobeat, ‘Eni Agee’ (2022)

== See also ==
- British Bangladeshi
- List of British Bangladeshis
- List of jazz musicians
