= A House Named Shahana =

2025 Bangladeshi drama film

- Theatrical release poster
- Bengali: বাড়ির নাম শাহানা
- Literally: The name of the house is Shahana.
- Directed by: Leesa Gazi
- Screenplay by: Leesa Gazi; Aanon Siddiqua
- Produced by: Arifur Rahman
- Starring: Aanon Siddiqua; Lutfur Rahman George
- Cinematography: Xoaher Musavvir
- Edited by: Alex Unai Arrieta
- Music by: Sohini Alam; Oliver Weeks
- Production companies: Komola Collective; Goopy Bagha Productions Limited
- Release dates: 28 October 2023 (MAMI); 19 September 2025 (Bangladesh)
- Running time: 120 mins
- Countries: Bangladesh; United Kingdom
- Language: Bengali

A House Named Shahana (Bengali: বাড়ির নাম শাহানা, romanized: Bāṛir nām śāhānā) is a 2023 Bengali-language drama film directed by Leesa Gazi. The film is adaption of her own 2011 novella as her debut feature. Set in 1990s rural Bangladesh, the film follows a divorcee who defies social stigma and the burden of family honour to live on her own terms.

The film had its world premiere at the South Asia Competition section of the MAMI Mumbai Film Festival 2023 on 28 October 2023, where it won the Film Critics Guild Gender Sensitivity Award. It was theatrically released in Bangladesh on 19 September 2025.

It was selected as the Bangladeshi entry for the Best International Feature Film at the 98th Academy Awards, but it was not nominated.

== Synopsis ==
The film follows defiant journey of Dipa, a young woman navigating societal constraints in 1990s rural Bangladesh. Raised in a household overshadowed by domineering relatives and emotionally absent parents, Dipa is hastily married to a widower in England via a trunk-call ceremony in an attempt to suppress her adolescent desires. The marriage proves traumatic, marked by sexual violence and emotional isolation. She flees back to Bangladesh, where as a divorcee, she confronts societal stigma and family dishonor. Gradually rebuilding her life and career in medicine, she emerges as a confident professional.

The narrative centers on her journey toward self-determination, resilience, and liberation within a patriarchal society.

== Cast ==
- Aanon Siddiqua as Shahrin Munshi Dipa
- Lutfur Rahman George as Forhad Munshi
- Iresh Zaker as Shukhomoy Haldar
- Kazi Ruma as Dilruba
- Kamrunnahar Munni as Julekha
- Mugdhota Morshed Wriddhi as Pori
- Amirul Haque Chowdhury as Sirajur (Uncle)
- Naila Azad as Sajeda (Aunt)
- Arif Islam
- Naimur Rahman Apon as Sohrab
- Jayanto Chattopadhyay as Kobiraj

== Production ==
The concept for the film originated around 2011, based on Leesa Gazi's own novella, published in Daily Prothom Alo. It was produced by Komola Collective in association with Goopy Bagha Productions Limited. Cinematography was led by Xoaher Musavvir, with editing by Alex Unai Arrieta. The musical score was composed by Sohini Alam and Oliver Weeks. Notably, the film employed live sound recording during production, foregoing traditional post-production dubbing.

== Release ==
A House Named Shahana had its premiere at the Mumbai Film Festival on 28 October 2023 in South Asia Competition, where it won the Gender Sensitivity award. It was showcased in the Strand: Young Rebels at the London Indian Film Festival on 23 November 2023.

It was screened at the Dhaka International Film Festival on 23 January 2024.

It was also screened at the 2024 Kolkata People's Film Festival, and at the Asian Film Festival Barcelona in Panorama on 30 October 2024.

== Reception ==
Debanjan Dhar, reviewing the film for High on Films at the IFFLA, awarded the film 3.5 out of 5 stars, and praised it as a nuanced and powerful depiction of female agency and determination. Dhar highlighted the film's central character, Dipa, as an unapologetic and assertive figure whose courageous pursuit of her own path leaves a lasting and deeply inspiring impression. Praising Aanon Siddiqua, Dhar wrote, "Siddiqua brings both steeliness and a sense of lightness to the role [of Dipa]."

== Accolades ==
Award	Date of ceremony	Category	Recipient	Result	Ref.
MAMI Mumbai Film Festival	3 November 2023	Film Critics Guild Gender Sensitivity Award	A House Named Shahana	Won	

== See also ==
- List of submissions to the 98th Academy Awards for Best International Feature Film
- List of Bangladeshi submissions for the Academy Award for Best International Feature Film
