= Maleka Khan =

Bangladeshi social worker (born c. 1943)

Maleka Khan (Bengali: মালেকা খান; born c. 1943) is a Bangladeshi social worker and activist for the rights of the Birangana, women raped during the Bangladesh Liberation War in 1971.

== Early life and career ==
Khan trained as a social worker, and later served as the secretary of the East Pakistan branch of the Pakistan Girl Guides Association, and subsequently the Bangladesh Girl Guides Association following Bangladesh's independence.

== Activism ==
=== Bangladesh Liberation War (1971) ===
In 1971, a revolution and armed conflict emerged in East Pakistan, sparked by the rise of Bengali nationalism and a subsequent self-determination movement. After the Pakistani military junta, based in West Pakistan, launched a military assault to suppress the nationalist movement, an underground resistance movement, the Mukti Bahini, started a guerrilla war against the Pakistan Armed Forces.

When hostilities broke out, Khan was working for the Bangladesh Girls Guide Association in Dhaka. She fled with her husband to stay with his family in Narsingdi, though she continued visiting Dhaka weekly, where she trained girl guides with skills to utilise as part of the war effort; her in-laws' home also served as a secret support base for freedom fighters during the war.

Khan's brother, Atiqur Rahman, was killed by members of the Pakistan Army while stationed at Comilla Cantonment in Mainamati, Comilla District; his body was recovered in a mass grave in 1972.

=== Bangladesh Central Women's Rehabilitation Centre (1972–1975) ===
In December 1971, the war came to an end with the Pakistani Armed Forces surrendering and East Pakistan seceding from Pakistan as the People's Republic of Bangladesh. Following this, Khan returned to Dhaka permanently, where she was asked to help mobilise female volunteers to support with war recovery efforts.

Soon afterwards, Khan heard rumours that the Pakistan Army had raped women and kept them captive in underground bunkers located around the city. Khan located one such bunker at the Nakhal Para MP Hostel near Jahangir Gate, and rescued the women, providing them with clothing and taking them to government-run safe houses. It was estimated that between 200,000 and 400,000 women were raped by the Pakistan Army and its collaborators during the war. On 22 December 1971, the government of Bangladesh declared the women to be Birangana (lit. 'war-heroine'), with the country's president, Sheikh Mujibur Rahman, calling them his "daughters" and urging Bangladeshis to treat them with "honour and dignity". Khan worked closely with Sufia Kamal, a poet who established Kendriya Mahila Punarbashan Shanshta, an organisation to support female survivors of rape and torture during the war; in 1972, Khan became the executive director of the Bangladesh Central Women's Rehabilitation Centre (CWRC), established at 20 New Eskaton Road, Dhaka.

The CWRC provided shelter, counselling, and training for Biranganas, many of whom were socially rejected due to their status. Khan publicly called on the Bangladeshi government to permit abortions for Biranganas pregnant as a result of rape, as well as to legalise adoption for babies born as a result; she criticised the lack of support given to Biranganas by Sheikh Mujibur Rahman, particularly after he said publicly that "we do not want Pakistani blood" in reference to babies fathered by Pakistani soldiers. Khan particularly promoted and utilised the use of crafting as a way for Biranganas to process their trauma, and utilised this at the CWRC.

Khan remained the director of the CWRC until 1975 when it was closed down following Sheikh Mujibur Rahman's assassination.

=== Subsequent activism (1976–present) ===
Despite being an advocate for the rights of Biranganas, Khan was herself critical of the term, and long called for the term to be officially replaced with Mukti Bahini (lit. 'freedom fighters'). Khan publicly praised the prime minister of Bangladesh, Sheikh Hasina in 2015 when her government approved a proposal to upgrade the status of Biranganas to Mukti Bahini. By June 2021, 416 Biranganas had officially been recognised as Mukti Bahini, entitling them to additional government benefits.

Khan has also called on the international community to put the perpetrators of the Bangladesh genocide on trial.
