= Monodrama =

Piece performed by a single actor

A monodrama is a theatrical or dramatic piece played by a single actor or performer, usually portraying one character.

== In opera ==
In opera, a monodrama was originally a melodrama with one role such as Jean-Jacques Rousseau's Pygmalion, which was written in 1762 and first staged in Lyon in 1770, and Georg Benda's work of the same name (1779).

The term monodrama (sometimes mono-opera) is also applied to modern works with a single soloist, such as Arnold Schoenberg's Die glückliche Hand (1924), which besides the protagonist has two additional silent roles as well as a choral prologue and epilogue. Erwartung (1909) and La voix humaine (1959) closely follow the traditional definition, while in Eight Songs for a Mad King (1969) by Peter Maxwell Davies, the instrumentalists are brought to the stage to participate in the action. Twenty-first century examples can be found in Émilie (2008) by Kaija Saariaho and Four Sad Seasons Over Madrid (2008) or God's Sketches (2011) both of them by Jorge Grundman.

== In spoken drama ==
In England the first example of monodrama was on a mythological theme, in this case Frank Sayers' Pandora (1790), in the form of a recitation with off-stage voices. Robert Southey took up the new form, producing eleven pieces so titled between 1793 and 1804; so did Matthew Lewis in his publicly performed and highly melodramatic The Captive. Few others actually appeared on stage and monodrama soon lost its connection with music. The term "dramatic monologue" came to be applied to such works, although the term "monodrama" remained in critical currency. Half a century later Tennyson himself referred to his Maud (1855) as a monodrama, and William Lancaster (John Warren, 3rd Baron de Tabley) published a verse collection titled Eclogues and Monodramas in 1864.

Nevertheless, Nurul Momen (Nemesis, 1944), Samuel Beckett (Krapp's Last Tape, 1958) and Anton Chekhov (On the Harmful Effects of Tobacco, 1886, 1902), among others, have written monodramas in this sense. Patrick Süskind has one person speak to the audience in Der Kontrabaß (1981). A more recent example is A Night in November (1994) by Irish playwright Marie Jones.

As developed by Russian symbolist Nikolai Evreinov (1879–1953) and encapsulated in his book The Theatre in Life (1927), it is a dramatic representation of what passes in an individual mind. Everything one witnesses on stage is portrayed from the mental state of the given protagonist.

The largest solo theatre festival in the world, United Solo takes place annually in New York City at Theatre Row. In 2013 it featured over 120 productions. In Kiel, Germany, an international theatre festival for monodramas takes place regularly, the Thespis International Monodrama Festival.

== See also ==
- Stand Up Comedy
