= Lokkhi Terra =

London based world music collective

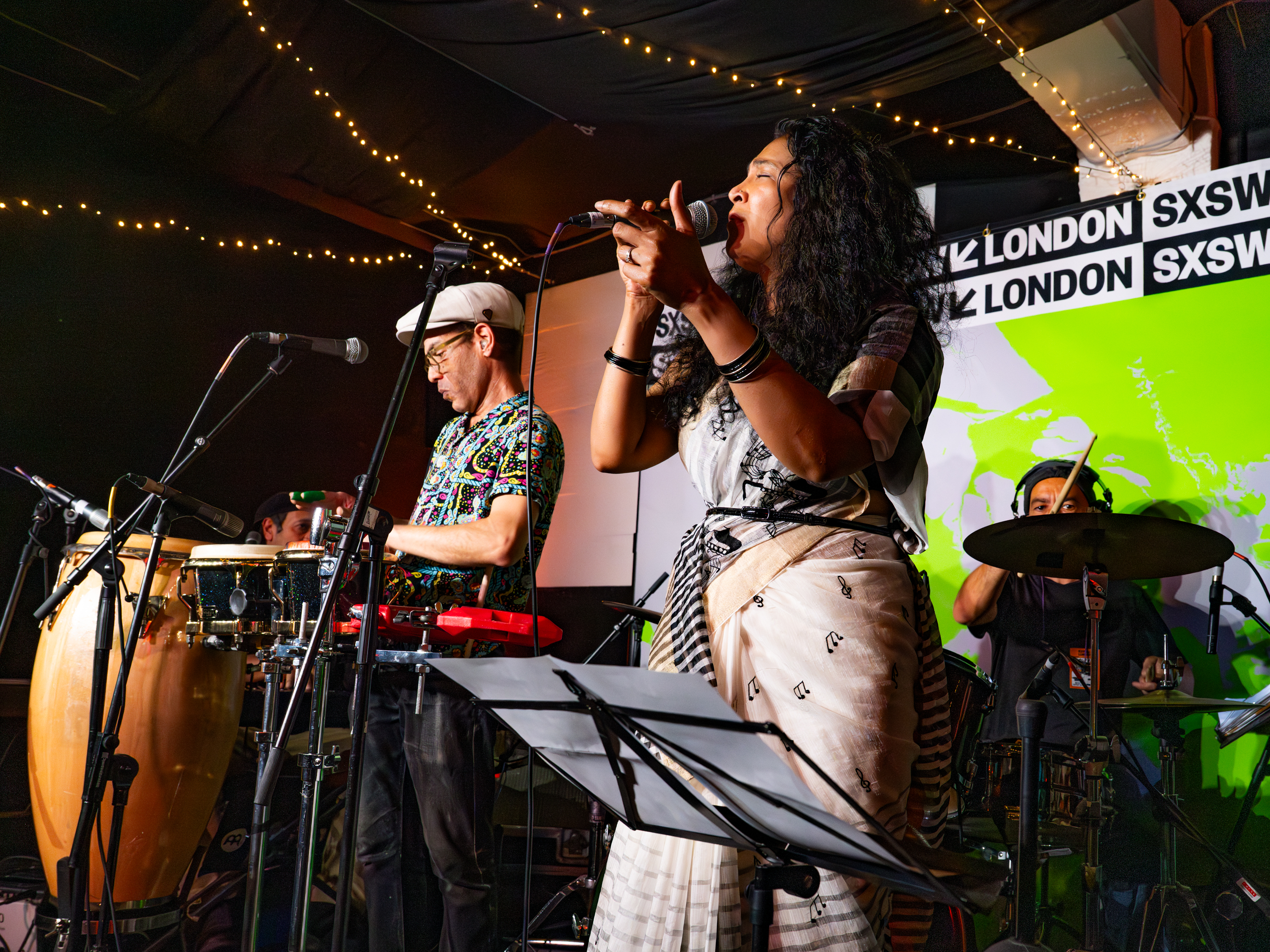
At SXSW London, 6 June 2025

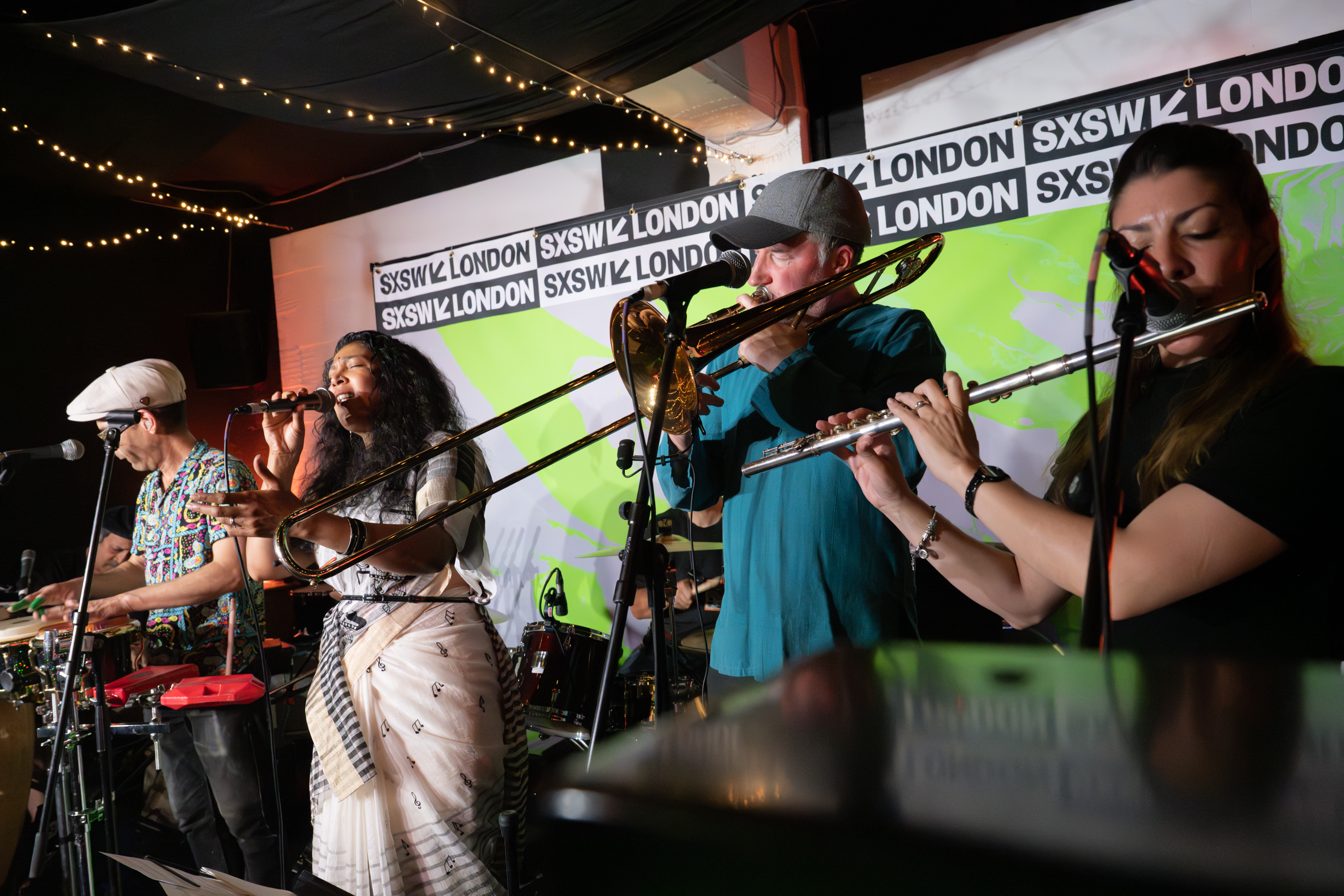
At SXSW London, 6 June 2025

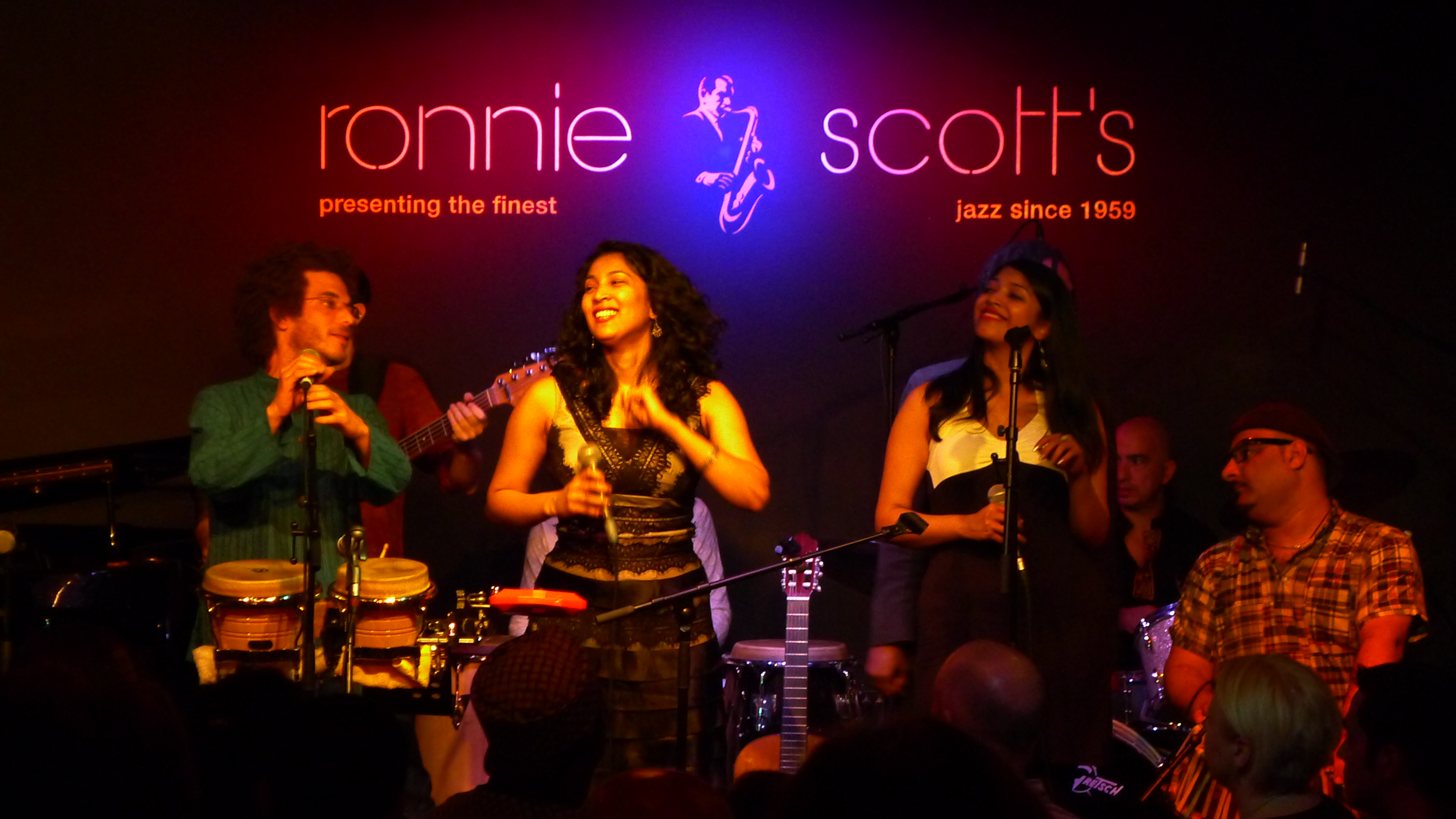
Lokkhi Terra at Ronnie Scott's, London, March 2012

Lokkhi Terra is a London-based world music collective known for mixing the different traditions that surround them in London – whether it's Cuban rumba with Bengali folk, or Afro-beat played on Asian and Latin instruments, or South African township mixed with Indian classical and funk. Established by pianist Kishon Khan, the band played its first gig at London's Queen Elizabeth Hall in 2006. They have performed at numerous venues since then, including WOMAD, Ronnie Scott's, Barbican Centre, and the opening ceremony of the South Asian Games.

Band members include Justin Thurgur on trombone, Graeme Flowers on trumpet, Phil Dawson on guitar, Tansay Omar on drums, Jimmy "Patrick Zambonin" Martinez on bass, Javier Camilo on bongos and vocals, Hassan Mohyeddin on tabla and vocalists Sohini Alam, Aanon Siddiqua, and Aneire Khan. Their albums also feature additional artists including Nazrul Islam on dhol, Pandit Dinesh on tabla, Haider Rahman on bansuri, and Finn Peters on flute.

Lokkhi Terra has released four albums to date: No Visa Required, Che Guava's Rickshaw Diaries, Cubafrobeat, and Cubangla. In a review of the second album, the world music magazine Songlines wrote: "this good-natured London-based collective are now widely acknowledged as an international force to be reckoned with". Lokkhi Terra also featured on the compilation albums, London's Calling and A Beginner's Guide to India.

== Discography ==
Studio albums

- No Visa Required (2010)
- Che Guava’s Rickshaw Diaries (2012)
- Cubafrobeat, with Dele Sosimi (2018)
- Cubangla (2020)

EPs

- Bangla Rasta (2016)
- Introducing Baby Akhtar (2017)
