= Leesa Gazi =

Bangladeshi writer and actress (born 1969)

- লিসা গাজী
- Born: 14 August 1969 (age 57); East Pakistan
- Occupations: Writer, playwright, theatre director, actress, television presenter
- Years active: 2008–present
- Title: Co-founder of Komola Collective
- Children: 2

Leesa Gazi (Bengali: লিসা গাজী; born 14 August 1969) is a Bangladeshi-born British writer, playwright, theatre director, and actress based in London. Her 2023 film A House Named Shahana was selected as the Bangladeshi entry for the Best International Feature Film at the 98th Academy Awards.

== Background ==
Gazi's father fought during the Bangladesh Liberation War.

== Career ==
Gazi is the co-founder of theatre and arts company Komola Collective. She was the script-writer and performer of Six Seasons and Tahmima Anam's A Golden Age at the Southbank Centre. Her theatrical credits include: Birangona: Women of War, Sonata, Rokey's Dream, Demon's Revenge, Ponderful People, and Bonbibi. She also wrote the script for Bonbibi: Lady of the Forest in 2012. She performed in People's Romeo, which had an eight-week nationwide tour with Tara Arts. Sonata, adapted and performed by Gazi, was invited to Bangladesh in 2010 by the British Council. She performed in a serialised adaptation of A Golden Age. She worked as the cultural coordinator and as a voice artist for Akram Khan's Desh.

In 2012, she worked as a script interpreter for the Globe to Globe Festival at the Globe Theatre on The Tempest. She acted in a play about domestic violence called Whisper Me Happy Ever After. She works for Train4change as an actor as well, and worked on a project with them on a film for the charity WaterAid. Between May and August 2014, she worked as an actor in a series of BBC educational films.

Gazi hosts Aei Jonopode, a weekly live-phone-in show on Bangla TV. In 2010, her first novel, Rourob, was published.

Gazi was awarded the Grants for the Arts by the ACE for the Birangona: Women of War theatre project by Komola Collective. She is the concept developer, co-writer and the performer of this theatre production.

In May 2014, Gazi was interviewed by Nadia Ali on BBC Asian Network.

== Personal life ==
Gazi and her husband have two children: one born in 2004 (named Sreya), the other in 2006 (named Orion).

== Filmography ==
=== Film ===
Year	Title	Role	Notes
2009	Life Goes On		Actor
2019	Rising Silence	director, documentary	directorial debut
2025	A House Named Shahana	Writer, director, feature debut	Oscar entry

=== Stage ===
Year	Title	Credit	Theatre
2008–2010	Sonata		Tara Arts
2010	Rokeya's Dream		Tara Arts
	Ponderful People		Face Front
2010	Bonbibi		Culturepot Global
2012	Bonbibi: Lady of the Forest		Culturepot Global
2015	Birangona: Women of War		Tara Arts

== See also ==
- British Bangladeshi
- List of British Bangladeshis
