= Khiyo (album) =

Studio album by Khiyo
- Released: 28 August 2014
- Recorded: 2007 – 2014
- Genres: Classical; rock; jazz; blues; Nazrul Sangeet; Bengali folk; Indian classical
- Length: 57:06
- Language: Bengali
- Label: ARC Music

Khiyo is the debut studio album by Khiyo, released on 28 August 2014.

== Background and release ==
The album was recorded over seven years. It was launched at the Forge in Camden Town, London on 28 August 2014 and re-released a year later by ARC Music.

== Track listing ==
No.	Title	Length
1.	"Akashta Kanpchhilo Kyan?"	5:04
2.	"Doyal Tomaro Lagiya"	4:09
3.	"Rum Jhum Rumu Jhumu"	5:20
4.	"Nishi Raat"	2:40
5.	"Amar Protibaader Bhasha"	1:46
6.	"Murshidi (Kachhe Nao Na Dekha Dao Na)"	4:07
7.	"Koi Jao Rey"	4:51
8.	"O Ke Udashi Benu Bajayey"	4:42
9.	"Purbo Digontey"	3:21
10.	"Hai Rey Amar Mon Matano Desh"	3:57
11.	"Amar Desher Matir Gondhey" (Abdul Ahad)	3:57
12.	"Ek Shagori Rokter Binimoyey"	3:29
13.	"Kotobaaro Bhebechhinu"	3:31
14.	"Bareer Kachhe Arshinogor"	6:12
Total length:		57:06

== Critical response ==
Songlines magazine's Amardeep Dhillon wrote, "An album of covers, Khiyo's self-titled debut is nevertheless a refreshing, original collection and is a fitting testament of Bengali identity."

Tim Chipping in fRoots said, "What's striking about Khiyo is the way each seemingly disparate element is played with the same conviction. They are as much a viceral rock band as they are intrepid interpreters of traditional Bengali songs."

In World Music Central, Arthur Shuey wrote: "In brief, this CD sounds like what would have happened if Pete Townshend had gone to India with the Beatles. It is full of power chords and passion...Now invest in it."

Adam Barnett of Newham Recorder and East London Advertiser said, "Khiyo's eclectic first album marries a grungy rhythm-section and dreamy acoustic guitars to classic Bangladeshi melodies in a way that feels natural and fresh."The Daily Ittefaq described it as an "Exceptional presentation and intelligent musical arrangement." RemoteGoat called it "Something different and altogether more interesting." Sangeeta Datta of Pulse Connects described it as "lucid and evocative". Arman R. Khan of Bangladesh's largest English newspaperThe Daily Star said, "Very potent, and can give you goosebumps."

== See also ==
- British Bangladeshi
- List of British Bangladeshis
