= Nemesis (Momen play) =

Bengali play

Nemesis (Bengali: নেমেসিস)
- Author: Nurul Momen
- Language: Bengali
- Genre: play
- Publisher: Momen Publishing House
- Publication date: 1948
- Media type: Book
- Pages: 64+7
- ISBN: 978-984-8261-32-3 (2009 edition)
- Preceded by: Rupantor
- Followed by: Yadi Emon Hoto

Nemesis (Bengali: নেমেসিস) is a play written by Natyaguru Nurul Momen, considered one of the most successful experimental plays in Bengali theatre. It is a play with only one character, written in 1944 and published in the acclaimed literary journal Shonibarer Chithi in 1945 and as a book in 1948. Nemesis, a tragedy, set a milestone in the history of Bengali literature because of its unique feature and modern plot. National professor of Bangladesh Kabir Chowdhury explains, "Nemesis is his (Nurul Momen's) most famous work. It is an experimental drama where through dialogues the main and only character remembers his past. It shows how a promising personality falls prey to greed and loses his morality. Though it is a play based on one actor, the scope of the plot is wide and a number of other characters come in through the main character's reminiscences."

It was also the first experimental Bengali play, as Nemesis contains only one character. This experiment was done earlier than Nurul Momen only by Eugene O'Neill and Jean Cocteau in the entire history of world theater.

== The Fourth Unity ==
In 1944, the Bengal playwright Natyaguru Nurul Momen, introduced the fourth unity in Nemesis. In this one-character play (monodrama), Nurul Momen immaculately maintained all the three Aristotelian unities of classical Greek theatre, and added a fourth unity.

In the preface of Nemesis the Natyaguru wrote, "In this play a fourth Unity is added to the traditional three unities of The Greek Tragedies -- Time, Space & Action. A new experimentation has been done by introducing a new unity --- "Unity of Person" despite maintaining the format of The three unities."

In fact, the two plays Rupantor and Nemesis by Nurul Momen, ushered in the modernism of theatre of East Bengal, subsequently called East Pakistan and finally becoming the independent Bangladesh.

Before Nemesis only a few playwrights had attempted a one-character play, but none had the full form of a play continuing for one and a half hours without break. Nurul Momen did not only adorn the play with witty dialogues, but also made the character recite poems and even sing. His conversations over the phone, with neighbours, with his conscience and lastly with his murderer is drawn in such a way that the absence of these characters on the stage is never felt.

Written against the backdrop of Bengal famine of the early 1940s, Nemesis depicts the moral predicaments of a middle-class schoolteacher Surojit Nandi. Surojit married Sulota, daughter of the dishonest, affluent Nripen Bose. Nripen gives Surojit an ultimatum that if he [Surojit] can not earn five hundred thousand Taka within three months, he won't accept the latter's marriage to his daughter. Surojit is left with no other option but to undertake several unethical actions. Eventually he wants to break free from the wrong path but he is denied by Nemesis, the Greek goddess of retribution and vengeance.

== See also ==
- Nondito Noroke by Humayun Ahmed
- NityaPurana by Masum Reza
- Che'r Cycle by Mamunur Rashid
