= Dele Sosimi =

Nigerian-British musician (born 1963)

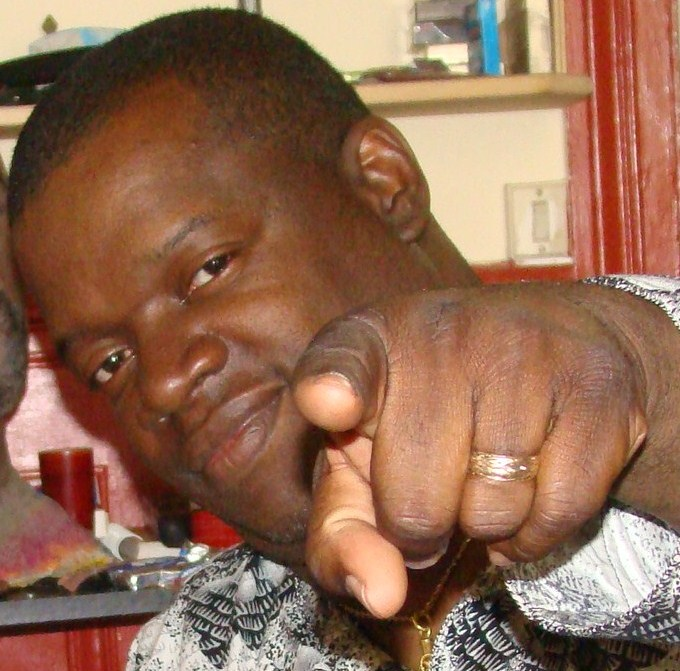
- Sosimi in Paris, 2009

Background information
- Born: 22 February 1963 (age 63)
- Origin: Hackney, London, England
- Genres: Afrobeat
- Occupation: Musician
- Instruments: Vocals, keyboard
- Years active: 1979–present
- Labels: Wah Wah 45s; Helico; Eko Star Music
- Website: delesosimi.org

Bamidele Olatunbosun Sosimi (born 22 February 1963), known as Dele Sosimi, is a Nigerian-British musician.

== Biography ==
Sosimi was born in Hackney, London, England.

His career began when he joined Fela Anikulapo-Kuti's Egypt 80 (1979–86). Sosimi then created Positive Force band with Femi Kuti, with whom he performed from 1986 to 1994. In both bands he was keyboard player, also musical director taking care of re-orchestrating and arranging music as well as handling the recruiting and training of new musicians.

Based on Afrobeat, Dele's music is a blend of complex funk grooves, Nigerian traditional music, and African percussion, underpinning the jazz horns and solos from other instruments, as well as rhythmical singing.

His keyboard work can be heard on several of Fela's albums, as well as some of Femi's. Dele has also performed often with Tony Allen.

Following his first solo album, Turbulent Times, he was invited to select the tracks for the 3-CD compilation Essential Afrobeat (Universal, 2004). He was producer and co-writer of "Calabash Volume 1: Afrobeat Poems" by Ikwunga, the Afrobeat Poet (2004). He is a central member of the Wahala Project. He has also featured on British rapper TY's album Closer and his "Turbulent Times" is featured on The Afrobeat Sudan Aid Project (2006). His album Identity has been described by Songlines magazine as “A sizzling set from London’s Afrobeat leader”.

His performances include the Montreux Jazz Festival, Joe Zawinul's Birdland (Vienna) the Treibhaus (Innsbruck ), Paradiso and Bimhuis in Amsterdam, Oerol Festival at Terschelling, also in the Netherlands, the Ollin Kan Festival (Mexico City), Canada Afrobeat Summit (Calgary, Canada), Sensommer Int Musikkfestival (Oslo, Norway), Festival Musicas Do Mar and Festival Musicas do Mundo (Portugal), Festival Art des Ville - Arts des Champs (France) and the London African Music Festival, Hot Club in Lyon and Cave à Musique in Mâcon (France). In November 2010, Sosimi was appointed Afrobeat music consultant for the London production of Fela! at the National Theatre, London, in which he also plays keyboard.

Based in London, Sosimi is an educator and instructor in Afrobeat (via his Dele Sosimi Afrobeat Foundation, and as a visiting lecturer in Music and Media, London Metropolitan University). He performs in one of three formats – a 15-piece Afrobeat Orchestra (featuring a five-piece horn section and dancers), a six- to nine-piece band (the most frequently used format) or a trio/quartet (with bass and drums/percussion).

The core group of Sosimi's musicians is Femi Elias (bass), Kunle Olofinjana (drums), Phil Dawson (rhythm guitar), Maurizio Ravalico (percussion), Justin Thurgur (trombone), Tom Allan (trumpet) and Eric Rohner (tenor saxophone).

== Discography ==
Studio albums

- Turbulent Times (2002)
- Identity (2007)
- You No Fit Touch Am (2015)
- Cubafrobeat (with Lokkhi Terra) (2018)
- Take to the Streets (with Eparapo) (2023)

Remix albums

- You No Fit Touch Am In Dub (with Prince Fatty and Nostalgia 77) (2016)

EPs

- Too Much Information (Remixes) (2015)
- You No Fit Touch Am Retouched (2015)
- You No Fit Touch Am Retouched 2 (2017)
- State of Play (with Medlar) (2022)
- The Confluence (with The Estuary 21) (2023)

Singles

- "Too Much Information" (2013)
- "Sanctuary" (2014)
- "Full Moon" (2020)
