= NityaPurana =

2001 play by Masum Reza

Nityapurana
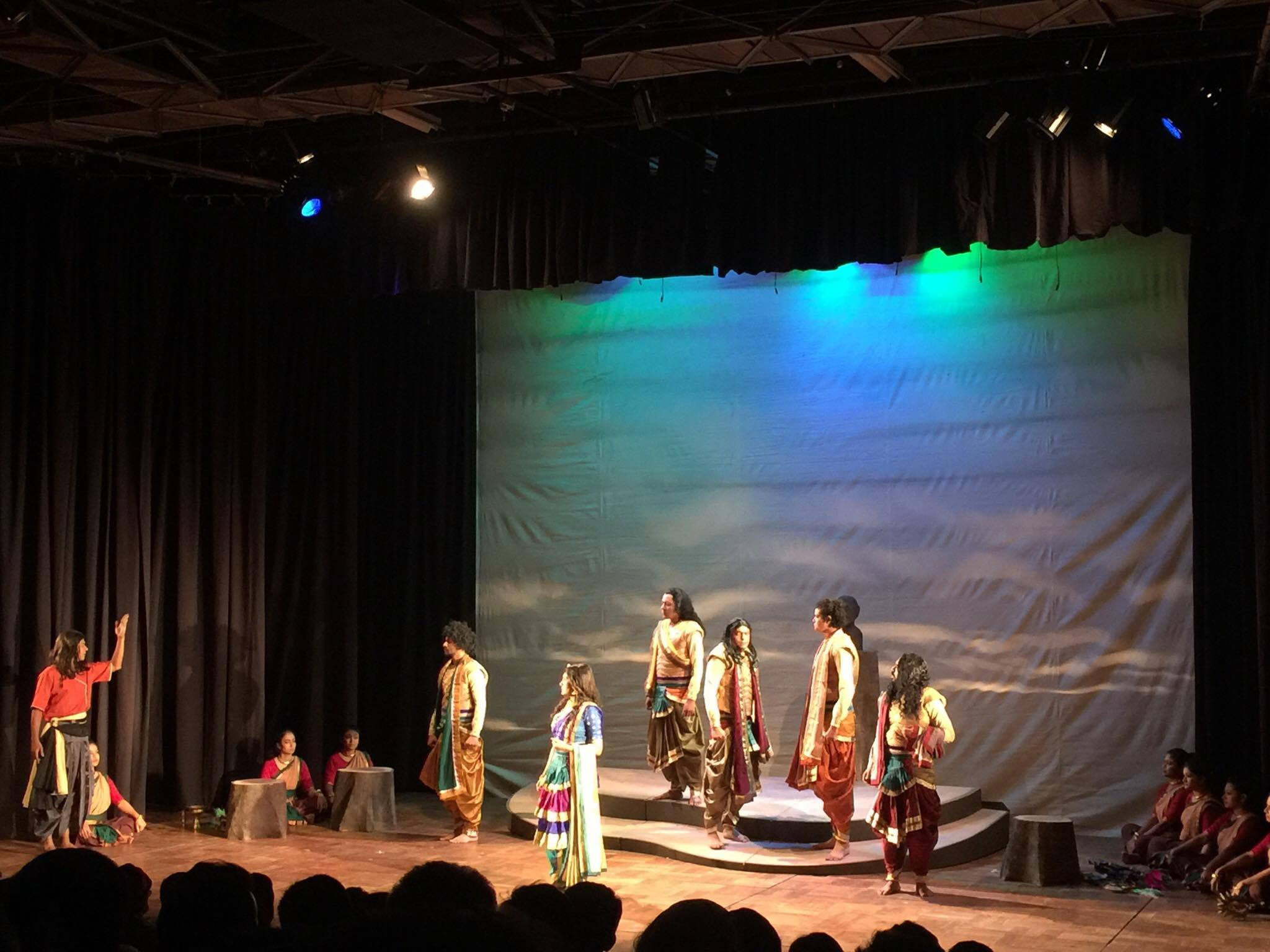
- Nityapurana 87th stage on Dhaka
- Original language: Bengali
- Written by: Masum Reza
- Characters: Ekalabya, Yudhishthira, Bhima, Arjuna, Nakula Sahadeva and Draupadi

Premiere
- Date: January 14, 2001
- Place: Shilpakala Academy

NityaPurana (Bengali: নিত্যপুরাণ) is a play by Masum Reza. The play is set on Baily Road Mohila Samity Manch, as are Reza's other plays, Birsha Kabbo, Aroj Coritamritya, Shamukbash, Jol Balika (2004), Baghal (2004), Surgaon (2017), Kuhokjal (2014). Most of this play premiered at Baily Road Mohila Samity Manch and Shilpakala Academy.

== Productions ==
On January 14, 2001, the first exhibition of the play was held on the Baily Road Mohila Samity Manch in the Dhaka city. After the 86th stage of 2005, the staging of Nityapurana was postponed. After 12 years later this play again shows 87th stage on November 10, 2017.

== Characters ==
- Ekalabya
- Yudhishthira
- Bhima
- Arjuna
- Nakula
- Sahadeva and
- Draupadi
