= Nurul Momen =

Bangladeshi playwright (1908–1990)

- নুরুল মোমেন
- Born: 25 November 1908; Alphadanga, Jessore District, Bengal Presidency, British India
- Died: 16 February 1990 (aged 81); Gulshan, Dhaka, Bangladesh
- Other name: Natyaguru
- Citizenship: British Indian (1908–1947) Pakistani (1947–1971) Bangladeshi (After 1971)
- Education: University of Dhaka; University of Calcutta University of London
- Occupations: Playwright; writer; educationist; theatre director
- Notable work: Nemesis · Rupantor
- Spouse: Amena Momen (d. 1993)
- Children: 4
- Awards: Bangla Academy Literary Award (1961); Ekushey Padak (1978)
- Website: tukunmomen.wixsite.com/natyaguru

Nurul Momen (25 November 1908 – 16 February 1990) was a Bangladeshi playwright, educator, director, broadcast personality, orator, humorist, dramatist, academician, satirist, belletrist, essayist, columnist, translator and poet. He served as a faculty member in the capacities of professor and dean at the Faculty of Law in the University of Dhaka. He also served as a lawyer. He is called "Father of Bangladeshi theatre" and "Natyaguru" (or Natyo Guru or Natto Guru) of Bangladesh (The Grand Teacher of Drama and Theatre). He was awarded the Bangla Academy Award in 1961. He was also honoured by the People's Republic of Bangladesh with the Ekushey Padak in 1978.

== Early life and education ==
Momen was born on 25 November 1908. His father was Nurul Arefin, a physician and Zamindar (landlord) in Alfadanga, of the then Jessore district. (After the partition of India, from 1947, Alphadanga is in Faridpur district.) He went to primary school in Calcutta and was admitted in 1916 into Khulna Zila School. At the age of ten he wrote his first poem, Shondhya (Evening), in the same verse as Tagore's Shonar Tory. In 1919 it was published in the journal Dhrubotara. In 1920, he was enrolled in the Dhaka High School where he resided in the Dafrin Hostel. After matriculation in 1924 he studied at Dhaka Intermediate College. Passing intermediate, he enrolled for a BA at the newly established Dhaka University in 1926.

While he was residing at "Muslim Hall" of Dhaka University, the various halls staged the then new play Muktadhara by Rabindranath Tagore. After some initial resistance, Momen received the main role of "Botu". This ignited his passion for drama and even earned him the first prize, but it was also the first time that he performed as actor himself.

After receiving his B.A. from Dhaka University in 1929, he studied law at the Department of Law, University of Calcutta. Upon completing his B.L. examinations in 1936 he started practicing at the Calcutta High Court.

== Career ==
=== Radio work ===
After the foundation of All India Radio in Dhaka, 1939, Momen picked up on the opportunity of the new medium and became its first Muslim author. In 1941 he wrote and directed the comedy Rupantor (Transformation) for the radio. With its progressive plot and a female main character it differed vastly form traditional Muslim plays and was actually the first modern drama of Bangladesh. Upon initiative of the critic, the poet and literary critic Mohitlal Majumder, the play was also published in the yearly Puja issue of the newspaper Anandabazar.

The second play written by him was the epoch-making Nemesis (Momen play). In fact, the two plays Rupantor and Nemesis by Nurul Momen, ushered in the modernism of theatre of East Bengal, subsequently called East Pakistan and finally becoming the independent Bangladesh.

While he was in London for higher studies from 1948 on, Nurul Momen and his friend Nazir Ahmed started a BBC Bengali program, a weekly one-hour format called Anjuman where Momen was responsible for the literary content.

=== Teaching career ===
Rather than continuing to practice law even before the partition of India, Momen joined the faculty of Law at the Dhaka University in 1945. There he was known for including elements from literature and music into the law classes. Sheikh Mujibur Rahman was one of his favourite students, who enrolled in that department in 1948. Nurul Momen encouraged Sheikh Mujibur Rahman to read the works of George Bernard Shaw and Bertrand Russell. He encouraged Munier Chowdhury to get interested in theater and become a playwright. Momen encouraged him to read George Bernard Shaw and got many other students interested in theatre. He later translated You Never Can Tell. From 1948 until 1951 Momen was on leave from the university, undergoing higher studies in England and graduating in law from London University. Upon his return, he found the language movement at its height. He encouraged the students to demand for the Bangla language. On 21 February 1952, Nurul Momen and his student Mohammad Toaha was in the DU playground, when the shooting took place & martyrs were fired upon. When the second Shaheed Minar was constructed in 1954, Nurul Momen was the prominent intellectual, who inaugurated the monument.

In 1961 he, along with his friend Justice Syed Mahbub Morshed, celebrated the birth centenary of Rabindranath Tagore.

In 1964 he organised the quarter centenary or, in other words, quadricentennial birth celebration of William Shakespeare.

=== Pseudonyms ===
Natyaguru Nurul Momen sometimes contributed two articles for the same newspaper at the same time using the penname "Magus".

He wrote the satirical post-editorial "Lest We Forget" as Nurul Momen, spanning 5 years for The Bangladesh Times; while he wrote for the literary magazine the series, "Forbidden Pleasure" under the pseudonym "Magus".

=== Theatre theory ===
Nurul Momen has devised a new theory in dramaturgy.

=== Fourth Unity ===
In 1944, the Bengal playwright Natyaguru Nurul Momen, introduced the fourth unity in Nemesis. In this one-character play (monodrama), Nurul Momen immaculately maintained all the three Aristotelian unities of Time, place & action. Moreover, he introduced the Fourth Unity in the history of dramaturgy.

In the introduction of his 1944 one character play Nemesis, he wrote, "In this play a fourth Unity is added to the traditional three unities of The Greek Tragedies -- Time, Place and Action. A new experimentation has been done by introducing a new unity --- ‘Unity of Person’ despite maintaining the format of The three unities."

== Literary works ==
- Rupantor (first written & directed by him for All India Radio in 1942.)
- Nemesis
- Yadi Emon Hoto (1961)
- Naya Khandan (1961)
- Alochhaya (1962)
- Shatkara Ashi
- Ainer Antorale
- Rupolekha
- Bhai Bhai Shobai
- Eituku ei Jibontate
- Underneath the Law
- We are Brothers All
- Is Law An Ass
- At the Altar of the Law
- Huckleberry Finner Dushshahoshik Ovijan (The First & foremost translation of Mark Twain's Adventures of Huckleberry Finn)
- Oporajito (First translation of Howard Fast's The Unvanquished)
- Ekti Moddhogrishsho Raater Shopno (Literal translation of William Shakespeare's A Midsummer Night's Dream in Bangla, maintaining the iambic pentameter)
- Jeman Ichchha Temon
- Adikkheta
- London Probashe
- Ha-jo-bo-ro-la
- Lest We Forget
- Forbidden Pleasures
- Andhokartai Alo (1964)
- Thik Cholar Poth
- As You Like It

== Awards ==
- Bangla Academy Award best Playwright and litterateur, 1961
- Ekushey Padak for drama and literature, 1978
- Sitara-e-Imtiaz, 1967 (which he renounced and destroyed in 1971)

== Personal life ==
In 1936 Momen married Amena Momen, née Khatun (died 1993). They had four children – Momena Momen Saara (died 1995), Ahmad Nurul Momen (died 2009), Hammad Nurul Momen and Faisal Mahmud Tukun Nurul Momen.

== Legacy ==
On 25 November 2008, his birth centenary was celebrated at the Bangladesh Shilpakala Academy (BSA). His 102nd birthday was celebrated in November 2010 with a week-long festival, organized again by the BSA together with the Aurony Mohona International Foundation (AMIF). Natyaguru Nurul Momen's legacy remains carried on by his students & disciples Munier Chowdhury, Syed Waliullah, Ashker Ibne Shaikh, Sayeed Ahmed, Momtazuddin Ahmed, Syed Shamsul Haq, Abdullah Al Mamun, Humayun Ahmed, Selim Al Deen and others who followed Momen.
