= History of Stroud Green =

History of Stroud Green, London

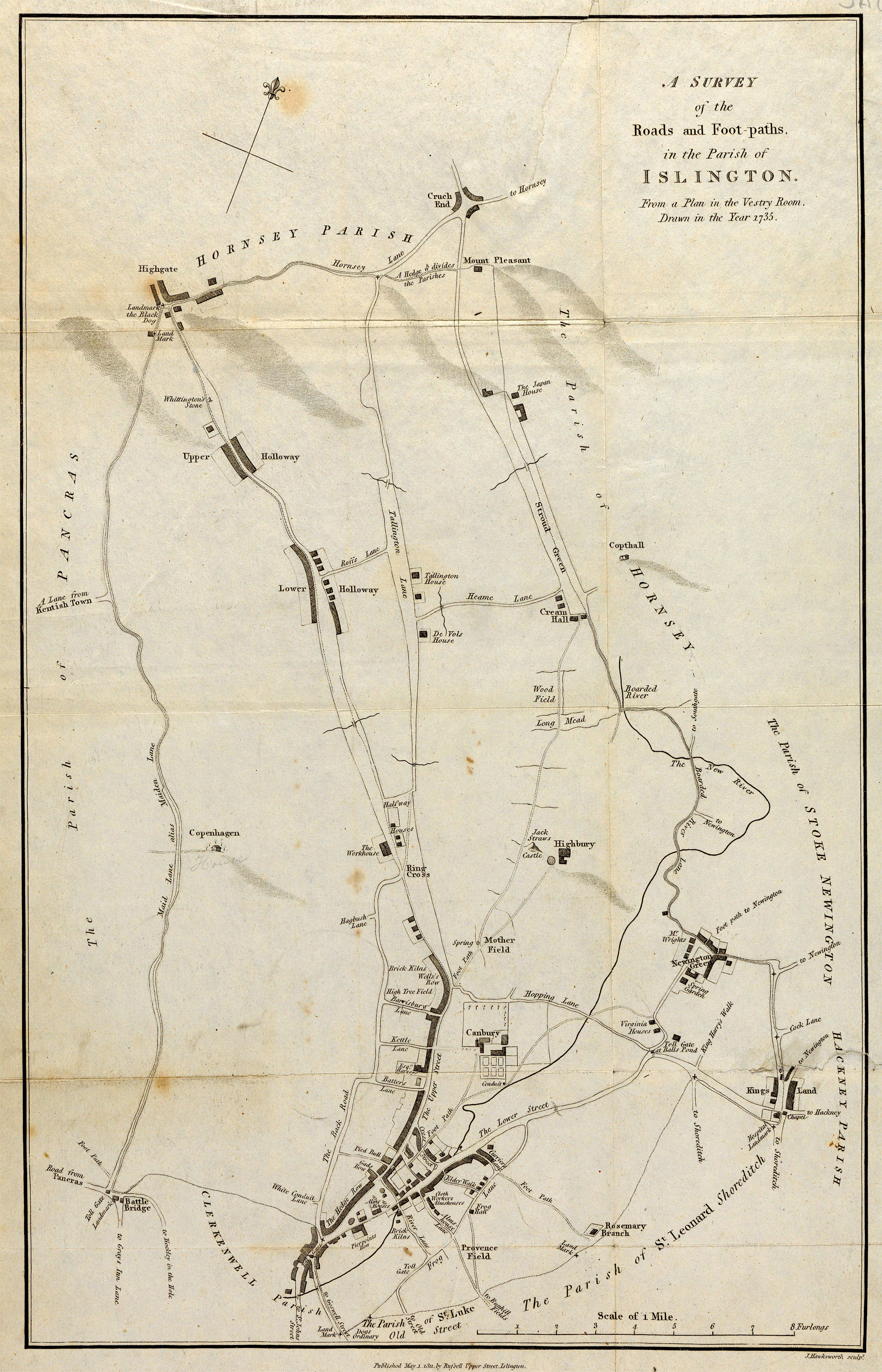
A plan of footpaths and roads in the parish of Islington (1735) showing the topography of Stroud Green.

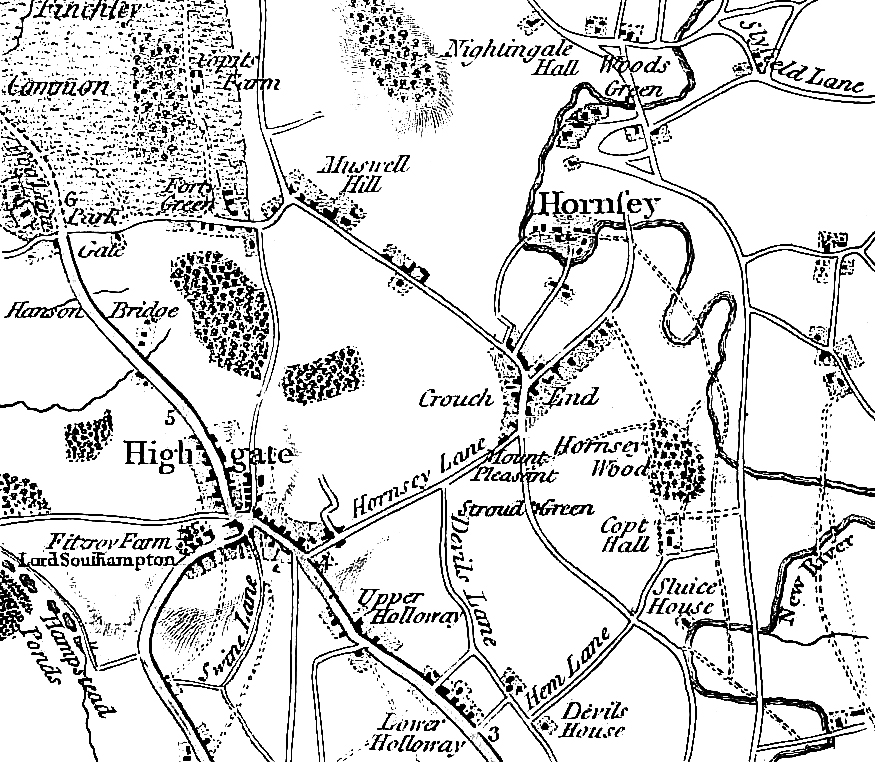
The context of Stroud Green, London, in its immediate region in 1786

Stroud Green in London, England, is a suburb adjacent to Finsbury Park in the northern part of Greater London. While most of the area (east and north) is in the London Borough of Haringey, a very small part (west and south) is in the London Borough of Islington. The A1201 Stroud Green Road (running WNW-ESE) not only forms the boundary between the two boroughs but is also the area's principal thoroughfare and a busy local shopping street, with many popular restaurants and bars.

The Stroud Green Road (the A1201) also represents a border between the ancient ecclesiastical parishes of Islington and Hornsey. At one time, this part of Hornsey parish, and thus Stroud Green, stretched into what is now Hackney, following the present-day Blackstock Road as far as the junction with Mountgrove Road, all beyond the Seven Sisters Road (created c. 1832) that today forms Stroud Green's eastern boundary. Here in that former part of Stroud Green was the site of the Eel Pie House, a tavern on the New River (approximately the site of Number 41 Wilberforce Road. When this was demolished in the 1870s another inn, now the Arsenal Tavern took on the name) then the New River ran above ground at this point. This was originally in a wooden, lead-lined aqueduct - known locally as the Boarded River - but eventually that wooden construction was replaced by a raised earth embankment, atop which the river ran. Nowadays the New River runs underground in this area.

Records for Stroud Green date back to the start of the 15th century, but today it seems that nothing remains as physical evidence of Stroud Green's distant past, and the area is now dominated by housing that dates from the late-nineteenth century. Destruction of some parts of Stroud Green was caused by aerial bombing during the Second World War, and this led to the creation, by the then Hornsey Borough Council, of several zones of public housing. Since c. 2003 much of Stroud Green has been designated as a conservation area under the Planning (Listed Buildings and Conservation Areas) Act 1990, defining the areas as: "the triangular area enclosed by Stroud Green Road and the Haringey/Islington border to the south and west, Mount View Road to the north, and the railway line to the east" (see the full rationale below: Twenty-first-century appreciation). This geographical zone seems to mirror the area referred to as Stroud Green throughout the Victoria County History of Middlesex (1980), which, unless otherwise indicated, is used as the basis for much of the historical data provided here.

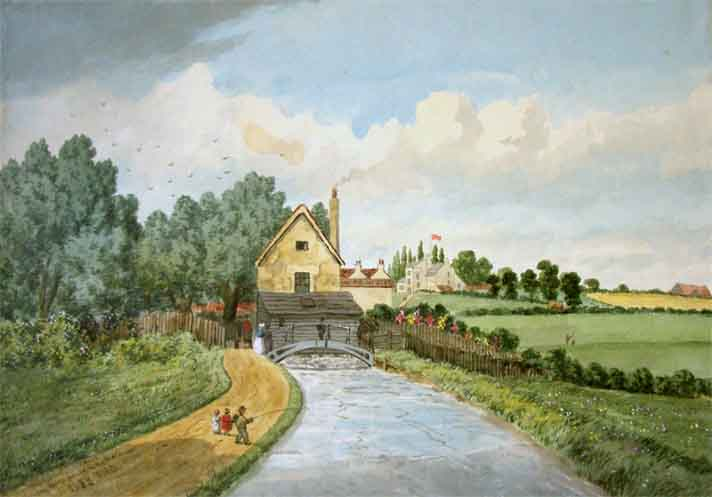
Eel Pie House (c.1844), once located near the New River Sluice House at the south-western edge of Stroud Green. Source: origin unknown

== Toponymy ==
In 1407 this once empty southeastern corner of Hornsey parish was called Strode, which is formed from the Old English 'stōd' and means 'marshy ground covered with brushwood'. It is recorded as Stowde Grene in 1546, the 'grene' suffix is Middle English and means 'village green'. Stroud Green brook flowed from Islington across the southern tip of the area.

== Land ownership ==
The records are sparse. In 1811 it was said that Stroud Green, which lies to the North-west of the situation formerly occupied by the Boarded River, is a long piece of common land belonging to the copyholders of Highbury Manor. As this article will show, details do exist of some named 'owners', but it is not entirely clear to the legal layman the exact status of their possession.

In the 16th century, part of Stroud Green was owned by John Draper (d. 1576), brewer of London. At his death in 1576 John Draper's estate consisted of 73 acres (300,000 m^{2}) between Stroud Green Road and Brownswood (the area around present-day Brownswood Road, south of Finsbury Park) and 32 acres (130,000 m^{2}) between the latter and Green Lanes. It was held variously by his heirs, presumably his sons in 1577, descending by his eldest son Thomas (d.1612), to the latter's sons Thomas (d. 1631), Robert (d.1642), and Roger. In 1636 it was held jointly by Thomas's widow Lady (Sarah) Kemp, Robert, and Roger and by 1656 by Roger alone. It was apparently among the lands that he devised to his brother Robert's son Thomas (d.1703), later a baronet, who apparently alienated it.

Sir William Paul of Bray (Berks.), Bt. (d. 1686), owned 110 acres (0.45 km^{2}) . This portion of Stroud Green was then held by his widow, who married Sir Formedon Penystone, Bt., c.1709, and it passed under Sir William's will to the Paul family. It was presumably among the property inherited from William Paul before 1727 by his daughter Catherine, wife of Sir William Stapleton, 4th Baronet (d. 1740), which apparently then descended to her son Sir Thomas Stapleton, Bt. (d. 1781). By 1796, however, the western portion of 81 acres (330,000 m^{2}) was held by a Mr. Lucas, who was succeeded in 1808 by John Lucas, who was the owner in 1822. It belonged to a William Lucas in 1823 and was enfranchised for James Lucas in 1856. It was owned by Joseph Lucas between 1861 and 1876 and was finally built over by 1880.

=== The Corporation of Stroud Green ===
18th-century London newspapers record details of a group known as the Corporation of Stroud Green.

On Monday the Ancient Corporation of Stroud Green held the annual feast at Mr. Dobney's near the New-river-head, at which were present upwards of two hundred members; after which Mr Kelly of Chancery-lane was elected Mayor for the year ensuing, and an elegant entertainment was provided on the occasion.
(Gazetteer and New Daily Advertiser (London) Thursday 2 August 1764; Issue 11 042)

Other newspaper reports show that such so-called Corporations were not unusual at this time, and indeed formed something of an informal regional network, for in 1754 the following item was reported in the London press:

Last Monday evening the Mayor, Sheriffs and Aldermen of Stroud Green paid their annual Visit to the Mayor, Sheriffs and Aldermen of Kentish Town, at their Council-Chamber at the Bell in Little Shire-lane, near Temple Bar; when the Healths of his Majesty, and all the Royal family, were drank, under a triple Discharge of their Canon, and the night was concluded with the greatest Demonstrations of joy and Friendship by the Gentlemen of both of the loyal Corporations.

(Public Advertiser (London) Wednesday 20 November 1754; Issue 6259)

Their purpose seems to have been (at least in part) an annual beating of bounds relating to the establishment of property ownership. Thus, the Corporation may be a manifestation of the copyholders of Highbury Manor (already mentioned). The establishment of property rights, even today, is an important and serious matter for those concerned, but in Stroud Green it seems that its undertaking was (occasionally) not without a funny side, as is apparent from an account of the following year's meeting:

On Monday last, according to annual Custom, the Mayor, and Aldermen of the respectable Corporation of Stroud Green held their Court of Conservancy at Stapleton Hall (the capital Mansion on what is humorously called their Estate) near Mount Pleasant, where a sumptuous Repast was prepared for their reception of their present Sheriffs. After Dinner several loyal Healths were drank, and the Hall resounded with the names of Granby and Pitt. The whole was conducted with all [reasonable] Decorum; but what contributed in a great Measure to damp their Satisfaction was the lnebriety of his Worship's Sword-Bearer, who having imbibed large Drenches of Claret and Hock, was rendered unfit to scale the Gates and Stiles belonging to their Grounds, which, in a formal Procession, they yearly Survey, and by tumbling over Neck and Heels, unhappily lost the Insigne of his Office, viz. a Gold Sword about four inches long, of no inconsiderable Value.

(Public Advertiser (London) Friday 5 July 1765; Issue 9624)

Whatever the Corporation's official tasks might have been, they always seem to have had a good time:

On Monday last the mayor, aldermen and recorder of Stroud Green, assisted by the sheriffs, held a court of conservancy, according to ancient custom, at the Green Man on Stroud Green, known by the name of Stapleton Hall, where an elegant entertainment was provided by the mayor, and many loyal toasts were drank in honour of his Majesty's birthday. After dinner they returned to their mansion house, the Crown, in the lower-street, Islington, and the evening concluded with a ball, and every demonstration of joy suitable to the happy occasion.
(Middlesex Journal or Chronicle of Liberty (London) Tuesday 6 June 1769; Issue 29)

The last evidence of the Corporation (at least in newspaper sources) shows that c.1775-76 the organisation was meeting at the London Spaw tavern in Clerkenwell, followed by an evening at the nearby Sadlers Wells theatre. The move was probably the result of the sale of the Green Man tavern at Stapleton Hall in August 1769, when it seems to have reverted to use as a farm house. (See Stapleton Hall in the section Interesting Buildings, below)

==== The Corporation's badge ====
The Victoria and Albert Museum, London, owns an enamelled badge of The Corporation, dated 1773, showing St George slaying the dragon.

==== The Corporation's Song ====
The Song for the Ancient Corporation of Stroud Green appears in Fraternal Melody a song book of 1773, by a certain William Riley also containing, among many others, 'A Song for the Corporation of Grays inn Lane', and 'An Ode for the Corporation of Southwark'.

Among the subscribers to this song book are: Robert Grant, jun, Recorder of the Ancient Corporation of Stroud Green; Sheriff Richardson of the Ancient Corporation of Stroud Green; Sheriff Whittow of the Ancient Corporation of Stroud Green.

Song for the Ancient Corporation of Stroud Green

Set to Music by the Author

Ye Sons of Jollity and Mirth
Of each denomination,
Attend, while I declare the worth,
Of Stroud Green Corporation:
Tho' weak my Verse, 'tis strictly true,
And Free from adulation,
The praises then let me pursue
Of Stroud Green Corporation.

To fair *ASTREA's name we pay
Respect and veneration,
Of her we tune the vocal Lay
At Stroud Green Corporation
Long may She here with us reside,
And know none alteration
+May She still flourish far, and wide,
Like Stroud Green Corporation.
_{* Justice
+ from the motto of the Corporation
Justitia floreat, ut noi ab origine}

When met to take a cheerful Glass
In mutual recreation,
How sweetly do the minutes pass
With Stroud Green Corporation:
Each Alderman his quota pays
And that's in moderation,
No longer than he like, he stays
With Stroud Green Corporation.

For Albion, happy would it be,
Were those in higher station,
From Brib'ry, and Corruption, free
At Stroud Green Corporation;
But such high Crimes we're taught to shun
At out Initiation,
Which, brighter than meridian Sun,v Makes Stroud Green Corporation.

The mirthful Scenes we here enjoy
Exceed all expectation,
And Pleasure, which do never cloy,
Attend out Corporation;
For to improper Company
We ne'er give invitation,v Lest they disturb the Harmony
Of Stroud Green Corporation.

What *ORDER can with this compare,
And boast such regulation?
Or such immunities does share As Stroud Green Corporation?
In Brimmers since there's no deceit,
Take each a fit Potation,
'Twill make our happiness complete
At Stroud Green Corporation.
_{*or Society}

May Peace and Plenty ever smile
Throughout the British Nation,
And Pleasure all our cares beguile
At Stroud Green Corporation;v Here's Health, Success, prosperity,
To this Association,
Fill ev'ry Glass, and drink with me

To Stroud Green Corporation.

== Urban development ==
=== 19th-century growth ===
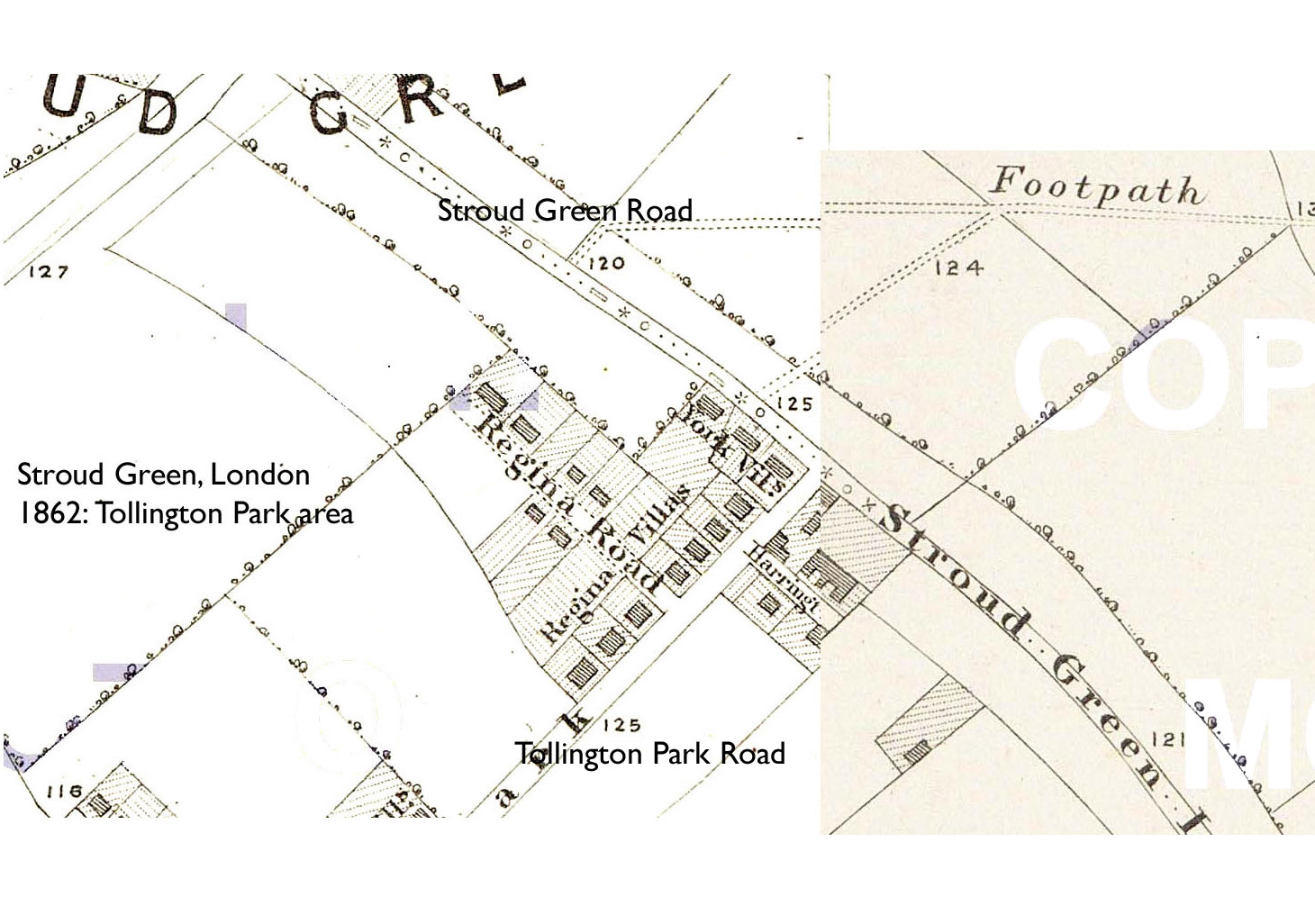
The junction of Tollington Park Road and Stroud Green Road in 1862, from the map by Edward Stanford

Until the mid-19th century, in this part of Hornsey parish, there were no houses between Crouch End and Archway Road to the west and only the huge Harringay House between Crouch End and Green Lanes. To the south, Stapleton Hall stood alone at Stroud Green, near to recently enclosed common land, and Hornsey Wood House (in what is now the park of Finsbury Park). Several cottages were in Wood Lane, near the present day Seven Sisters Road. A path led south-west to a bridge over the New River. Here, facing Blackstock Road, had stood since before 1804 the old Eel-Pie house, later (by 1847) the Highbury Sluice House tavern, with riverside gardens and the sluice-house itself immediately to the south. Other than those, and houses in 'South Hornsey detached' (now the area of Brownswood Road, south of Finsbury Park), there was nothing else south of the so-called 'Northern Hog's Back', a ridge of land that runs roughly west south-west to east north-east from Highgate to the present-day Harringay (West) station, the highest part of Stroud Green that borders Crouch End.

In effect, modern-day Stroud Green dates from the 19th century. New building at first was slow, perhaps partly because of poor sewerage, until the 1860s. Stapleton Hall remained the only house in Hornsey between Crouch End and Seven Sisters Road as late as 1861, but the streets of Islington were fast approaching towards Stroud Green Road, along the east side of which now stood several large houses. Rapid growth followed the opening of local stations at Seven Sisters Road (Finsbury Park), Crouch Hill, and Crouch End, as well as the new Stroud Green station.

In 1863 Joseph Lucas of Stapleton Hall leased land for building and in 1868 Mount Pleasant Road (now Mount Pleasant Crescent and Mount Pleasant Villas) had been built from the Stroud Green Road along the western edge of the Stapleton Hall farmyard, and over the Tottenham & Hampstead Junction Railway. In due course the Edgware, Highgate & London Railway would traverse that part of the road that is now Mount Pleasant Villas (see 'Railways', below).

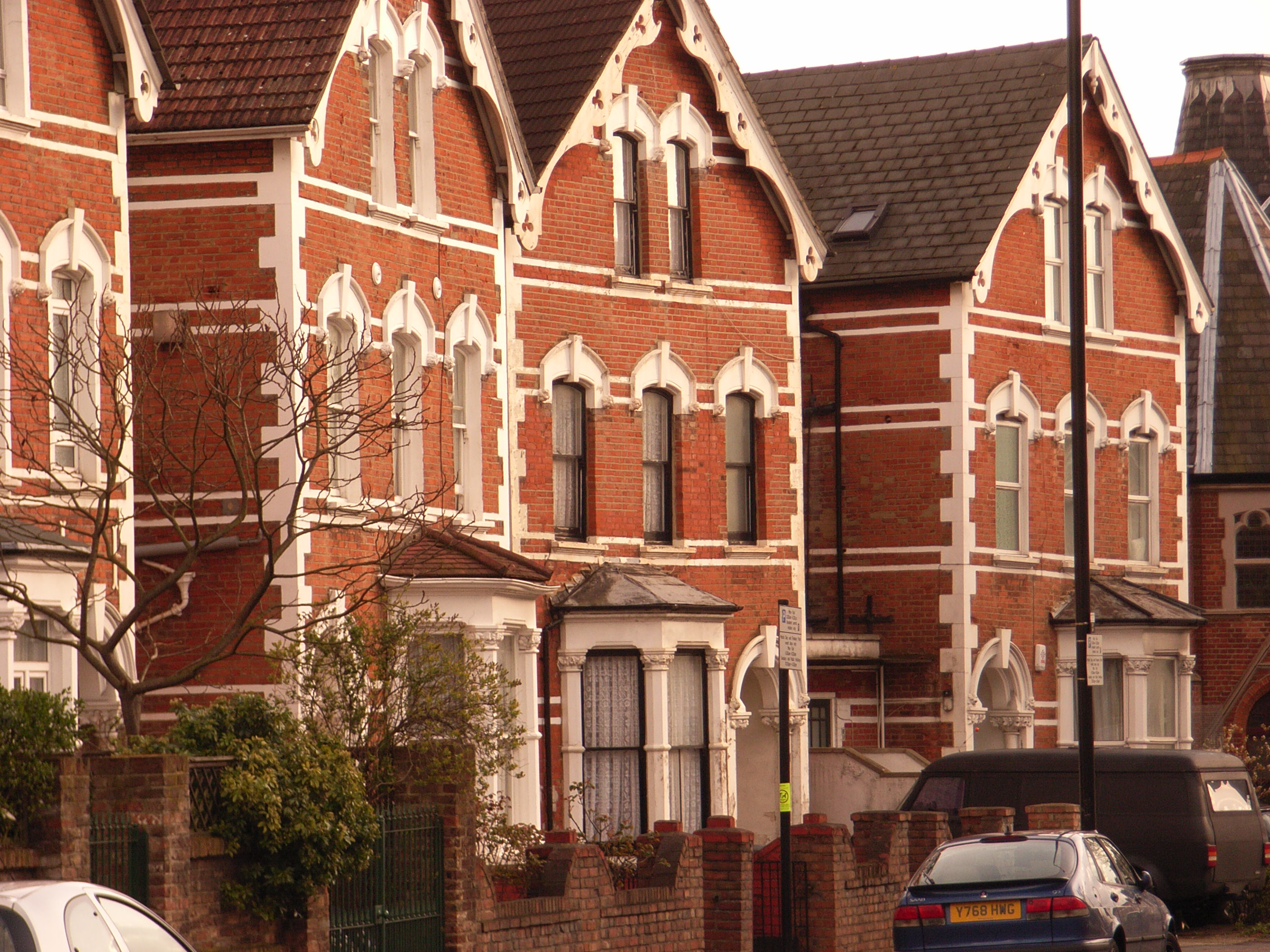
Houses on Stapleton Hall Road, in March 2008

Building development in Stroud Green was so rapid that the 1871 census was already considered unreliable by 1875, yet country houses were still being built in other parts of Hornsey parish until the 1880s; Muswell Hill and Fortis Green were still little altered by 1891.

It was during the building boom of the 1870s that Stroud Green had started to become part of an (even today) ill-defined urban area called Finsbury Park, which included Brownswood Park and parts of Islington.

There were 25 houses in Mount Pleasant Road in 1871. To the south, a grid of streets was already planned in 1868 and Osborne Road and Albert Road and Upper Tollington Park contained 49 houses in 1871, by which time the roads in the angle of land bordered by Stroud Green Road and the Great North Railway were largely built up. Stapleton Hall Road had been laid out by 1876 and Ferme Park Road was driven over the 'Northern Hog's Back' ridge towards Tottenham Lane in 1880.

By 1877 Stroud Green was a new and fast-growing neighbourhood with a strong community feeling and its own newspaper. It was now inhabited mainly by commuters with third- and second-class season tickets.

Stroud Green Road c.1910

The adjacent area of Harringay was built-up in the 1880s, while nearby Ferme Park and the Crouch Hall estate were partly built up by 1894. By 1894 there was a street fire station in Stapleton Hall Road, Stroud Green, and there were 26 alarm posts throughout the district. Building continued as late as 1893 in Stapleton Hall Road and in 1896 the area was virtually built up. No more building was possible.

=== 20th-century decline ===
In Stroud Green between 1901 and 1911, the population steadily fell. The declining size of families, however, permitted multiple occupation of houses and the provision of flats, which were associated with lower standards as early as 1900. Subdivision of houses caused concern by 1911, not only in Stroud Green but also in North and South Harringay. In 1921 1.35 families on average lived in each house, the trend being especially marked in the south and east and in 1923 linked to working-class immigration from Islington and correlated with a recent increase in poor-law cases. At Stroud Green houses were heavily divided and the district was in decay by c.1925.

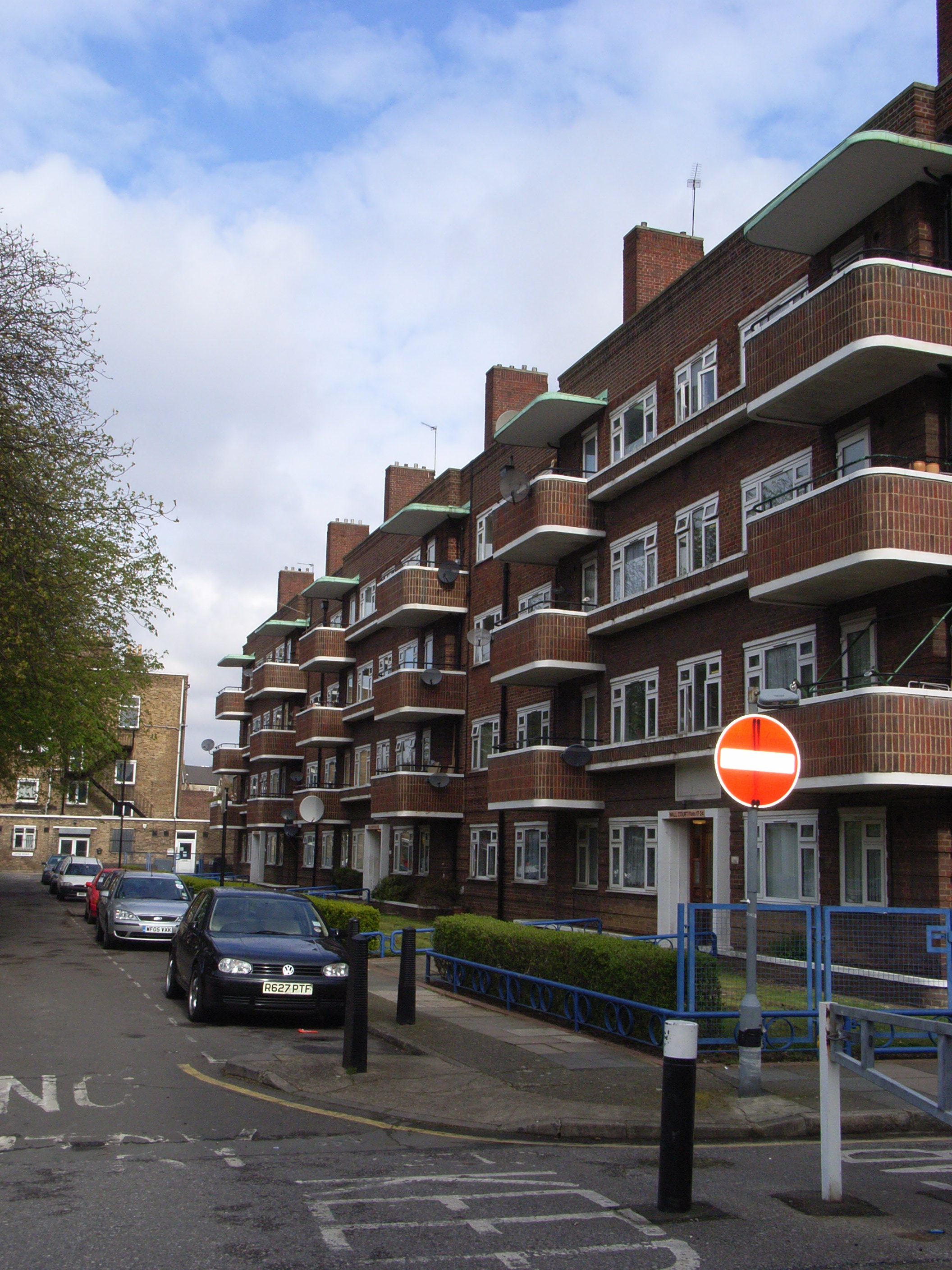
Wall Court (built 1947), facing Stroud Green Road, in April 2008

Hornsey as a whole was heavily bombed during the Second World War, when over 80 per cent of the houses suffered damage. Hornsey Council's first major post-war rebuilding was at Stroud Green, where most of the land between Victoria Road, Stroud Green Road, and Lorne Road and Upper Tollington Park was cleared. Facing the main road Wall Court, a balconied block much admired when new, was completed in 1947, Lawson, Wiltshire, and Marquis courts and Brackenbury were built in Osborne Road in 1948, and flats in Nichols Close between 1948 and 1952. Wisbech and Fenstanton date from 1953, the flats and shops of Charter Court from 1954, and Hutton Court from 1960. In 1948 Ronaldshay and Wallace Lodge, on opposite corners of Florence and Wallace roads, and Ednam House facing them were built and in 1952 an extension to Ronaldshay was finished. Carlton Court, 64 flats in Carlton Road, dates from 1947. On opposite corners of Oakfield and Connaught roads Connaught Lodge and Churchill Court were completed in 1949 and on the corner of Oakfield and Stapleton Hall roads Norman Court was completed in 1947. The cul-de-sac Osborne Grove was replaced by an old people's home by 1973. In 1974 Ennis and Woodstock roads were reprieved from demolition and in 1976 several yellow-brick terraced houses were being renovated.

=== 21st-century appreciation: a conservation area ===
In 2003 Haringey Council designated Stroud Green as a Conservation Area. Stroud Green is now regarded as an area of "special character or historic interest, the character and appearance of which it is desirable to preserve or enhance", Section 69 (1)(a) of the Planning (Listed Buildings and Conservation Areas) Act 1990.

The rationale for this decision was as follows:

The late 19th-century residential development in Stroud Green represents Haringey's most diverse examples of Victorian domestic architecture concentrated in any one area. The triangular area enclosed by Stroud Green Road and the Haringey/Islington border to the south and west, Mount View Road to the north-west, and the railway line to the east, includes a significant variety of 19th-century house types. These range from elegantly crafted artisans cottages to Gothic-revival and Italianate-renewal terraces, to Queen Anne style semi-detached houses.

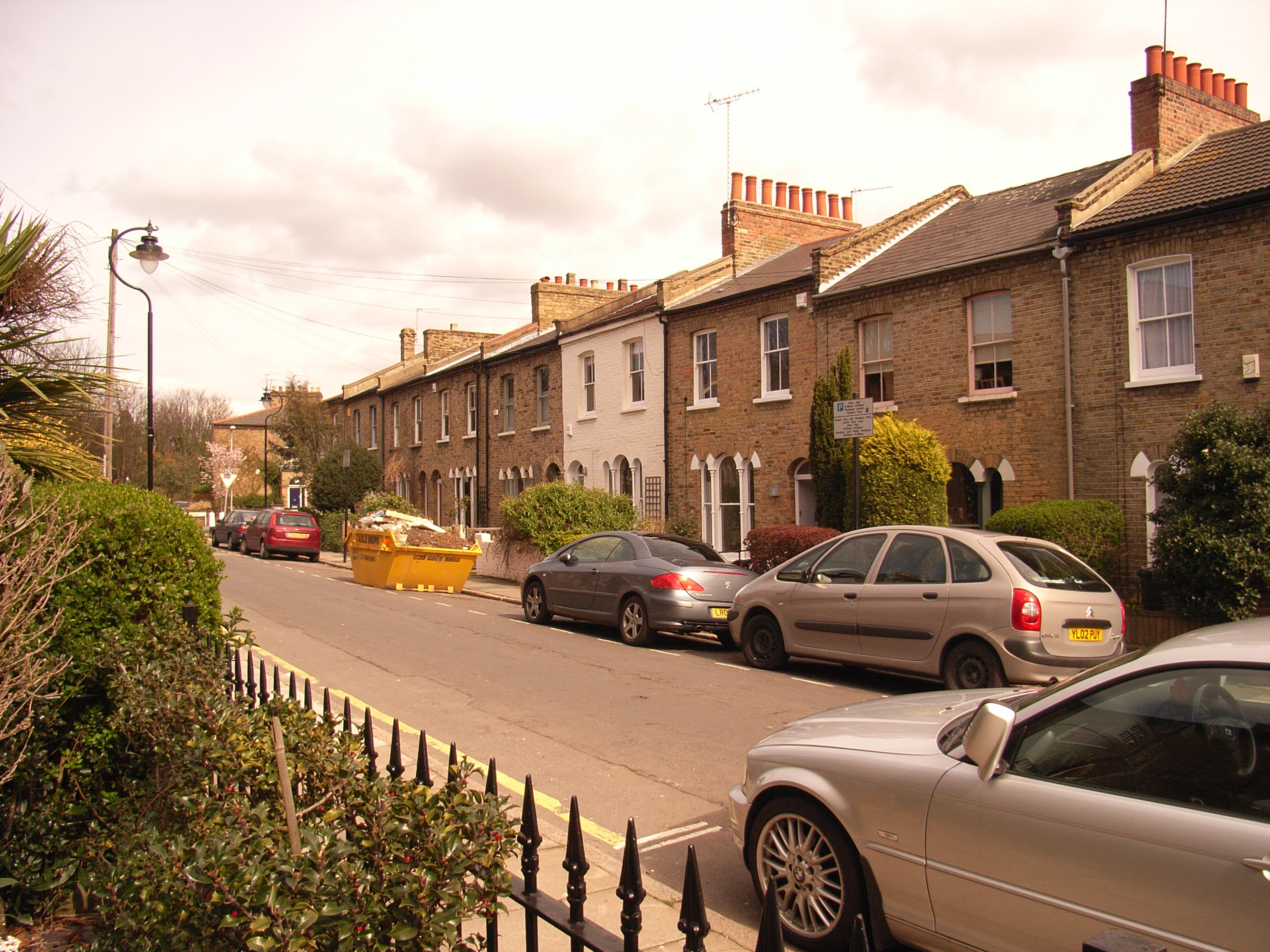
Mount Pleasant Crescent, in March 2008.

The architecture of the initial phases of development varies to reflect the Victorian styles in vogue at the time. The early three-storey 1870s houses along Upper Tollington Park, Florence Road, Victoria Road, and Mount Pleasant Villas, for example, are predominantly Gothic. They display pointed or round arch windows with Venetian carved foliage, polychromatic brickwork and prominent gables with ornamental bargeboards. Other houses from the same period, and in the same streets, are plainer and combine more subtle Gothic detailing with classically inspired features such as Italianate eaves. A particularly attractive street from the first phase of development is Mount Pleasant Crescent, which is lined by two-storey terraces. These compact dwellings are exceptional for their attractive tri-partite Venetian-style windows with contrasting red brick arcades, and slender cast-iron columns.

The second phase of building, along the south-eastern slopes of the Hog's Back ridge, was delayed for several years by the landowner, Charles Turner of Stapleton Hall who strongly resisted development near his estate. When building finally began after Turner's death in 1882, the prominent house style in England has moved away from the Gothic-inspired houses of the 1870s towards the Norman Shaw influenced 'Queen Anne' style that would dominate the 1890s and early 20th century. The change in style is evident along the north part of Stapleton Hall Road, and in the streets beyond, where the houses are characterised by the use of red brick throughout, simple canopied porches, and multi-panelled decorative sash windows. The open setting of the Hog's Back ridge is used to its full advantage and development here is generally less dense than in the first phase. Trees, hedges, and planting add considerably to the setting of the houses and are in the spirit of the 'Sweetness and Light' philosophy behind the Queen Anne style.

In general the architecture of Stroud Green remains intact and has survived the damaging changes that have eroded the character of other neighbourhoods in the borough, e.g. replacement windows, loss of boundary walls, unsympathetic cladding &c. It is a unique example of a small area exhibiting the full range of domestic building styles from around 1870 to the end of the 19th century.

== Transport ==
=== Roads ===
The principal thoroughfare through the area is Stroud Green Road. It has ancient origins, and formed part of an ancient route out of London, which forks east of Stroud Green at Clissold Park. The fork to the right (known as Green Lanes) extended along the whole eastern edge of Hornsey parish towards Bush Hill, Enfield and was turnpiked in 1789 in spite of Hornsey's opposition. The left fork followed the 'old' road which stretched north-westward to Crouch End via Mountgrove Road (Gipsy Lane in 1872), Blackstock Road (still called Boarded River Lane in 1849), Stroud Green Road, and Crouch Hill. These last two were known as Tallingdon Lane between 1593 and 1795. In 1795, Tallingdon Lane was noted as a rough track, which Blackstock Road apparently still was in 1832.

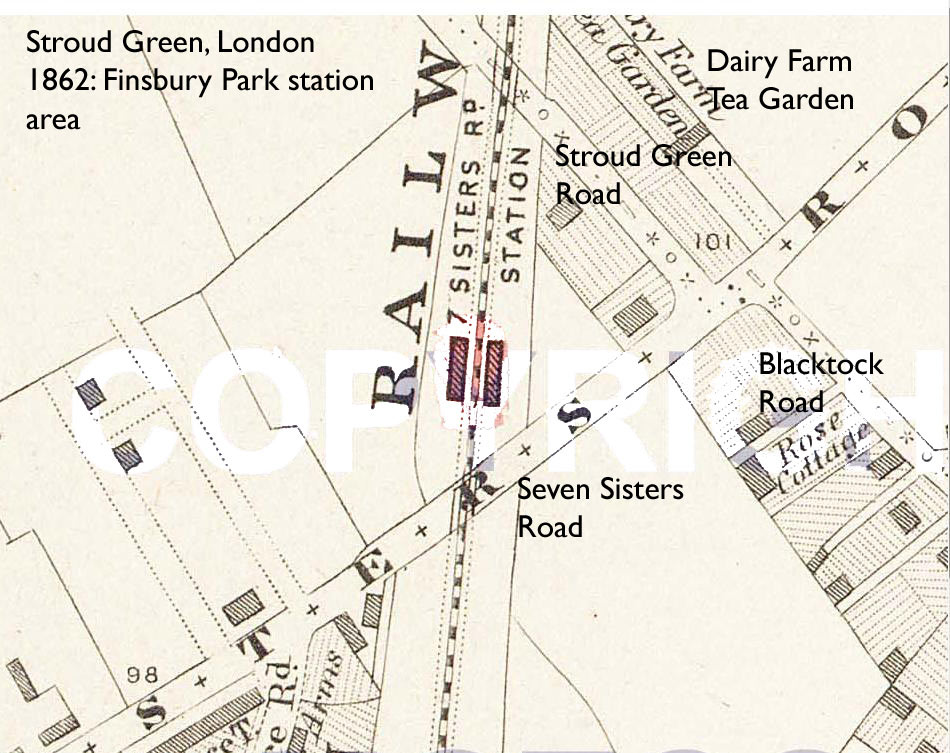
The junction of Stroud Green Road with Seven Sisters Road in 1862, from a map by Edward Stanford.

Given the low-lying nature of the area, and the heavy London-clay soil, it is not surprising that roads were susceptible to bad weather. In the 14th century roads in Hornsey parish were said to be impassable in winter. There were legacies towards maintaining main routes through the area, such as Brokhersthill (perhaps Crouch Hill), and the way from Highgate to St. Mary's church, and other local byways. However, in general it seems that maintenance suffered because Hornsey shared the responsibility for many of its far-flung roads with other authorities; not least, in the case of Stroud Green Road, with the neighbouring parish of Islington, which shared a border here.

Repairs to Stroud Green Road, were remembered as bad in 1593, while statute duty was often neglected in the 17th and 18th centuries, particularly in the period 1679 to 1686, and in 1792 another attempt was made to exact labour rather than money to try to improve the situation. Thus, for example, in March 1764, it was reported:

The inhabitants of Crouch End, Mount Pleasant and Stroud Green, have come to a resolution, by a voluntary subscription, to repair the roads from the first-mentioned place to the last, which at present are in a very ruinous condition, a great number of men being employed for that purpose.
(Lloyd's Evening Post (London) Monday 12 March 1764; Issue 1041)

In 1811 it was noted that the road was well made with 'quickset hedges on both sides', but such positive reports seem to be few.

Throughout the 19th century disputes continued between the parishes of Hornsey and Islington over the maintenance of the Stroud Green Road. It is still the case today that confusion, delays, and occasional wrangles arise over jurisdiction and maintenance of the Stroud Green Road, with the eastern side the responsibility of Haringey Council, and the western side that of Islington Council. `

In 1832 the Seven Sisters Road was built as a turnpike from Islington in a north-easterly direction across the junction of Stroud Green Road with Blackstock Road, towards Tottenham.

Some of the other new streets built in the 19th century were also important lines of communication. Endymion Road, built c. 1875 under the Finsbury Park Act 1857 (20 & 21 Vict. c. cl), connected Stroud Green and Green Lanes north of Finsbury Park, while the new Ferme Park Road, c. 1885, joined Tottenham Lane and Stroud Green.

An interesting survival from an earlier age is the 19th-century, brick-cobbled road surface comprising the first 50 yards (46 m) of Mount Pleasant Crescent, at the junction with the Stroud Green Road, and seemingly as good now as the day it was first laid.

=== Railways ===
Stroud Green is currently served by two railway stations: at the south-east end of Stroud Green is Finsbury Park station and at the north-western end Crouch Hill station. The now defunct Stroud Green railway station is discussed below, in the section Interesting (but absent) Buildings.

== Education ==
=== Education of yesteryear ===
In 1659 Roger Draper of Stroud Green left £120 to apprentice six poor boys of Hornsey to freemen of London in trades other than those of silk-weaver, tailor, and vintner; premiums of £15 for the master and £5 for clothing and equipping the boy were to be paid, not more than two each year.

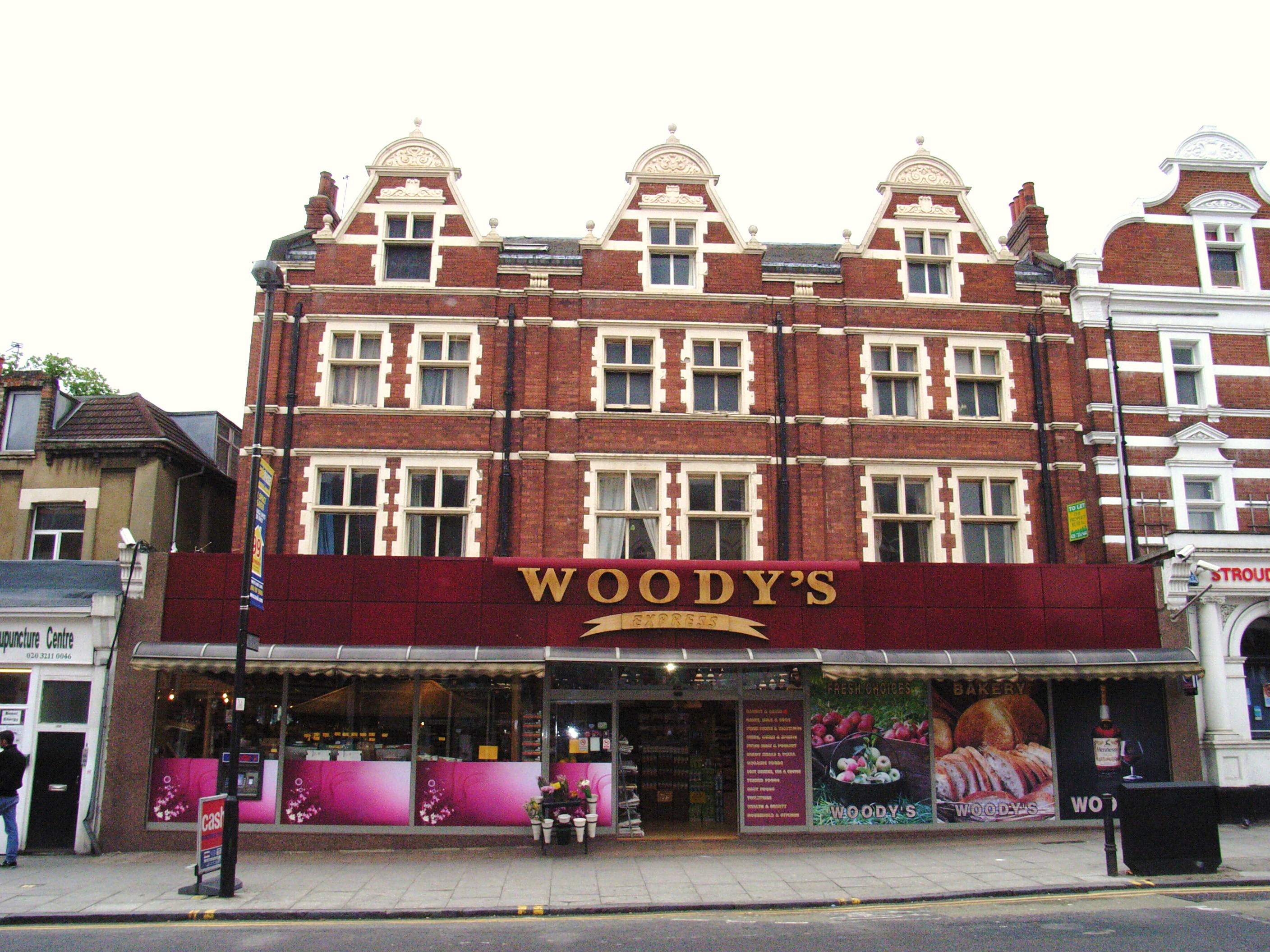
175 Stroud Green Road (centre), in May 2008

No 175 Stroud Green Road, built in the 1860s, began life as a girls school, although by the 1880s it had become the home of George Osborne Barratt, founder of the famous brand of sweets and liquorice made nearby in Wood Green. By 1899 it had been bought by a local draper, a Welshman called David Hall, who soon acquired the two adjacent properties (173 and 177), to create a large shop on the ground floor.

In 1890, Stroud Green had at least 21 private schools, including the forerunners of St. Aidan's Primary School and Hornsey High School for Girls, and there were two denominational grammar schools for boys.

The Anglo-French high school, established c.1884, had 100 pupils of all ages in Ferme Park Road in 1889 and opened a girls' branch in Ridge Road in 1890.

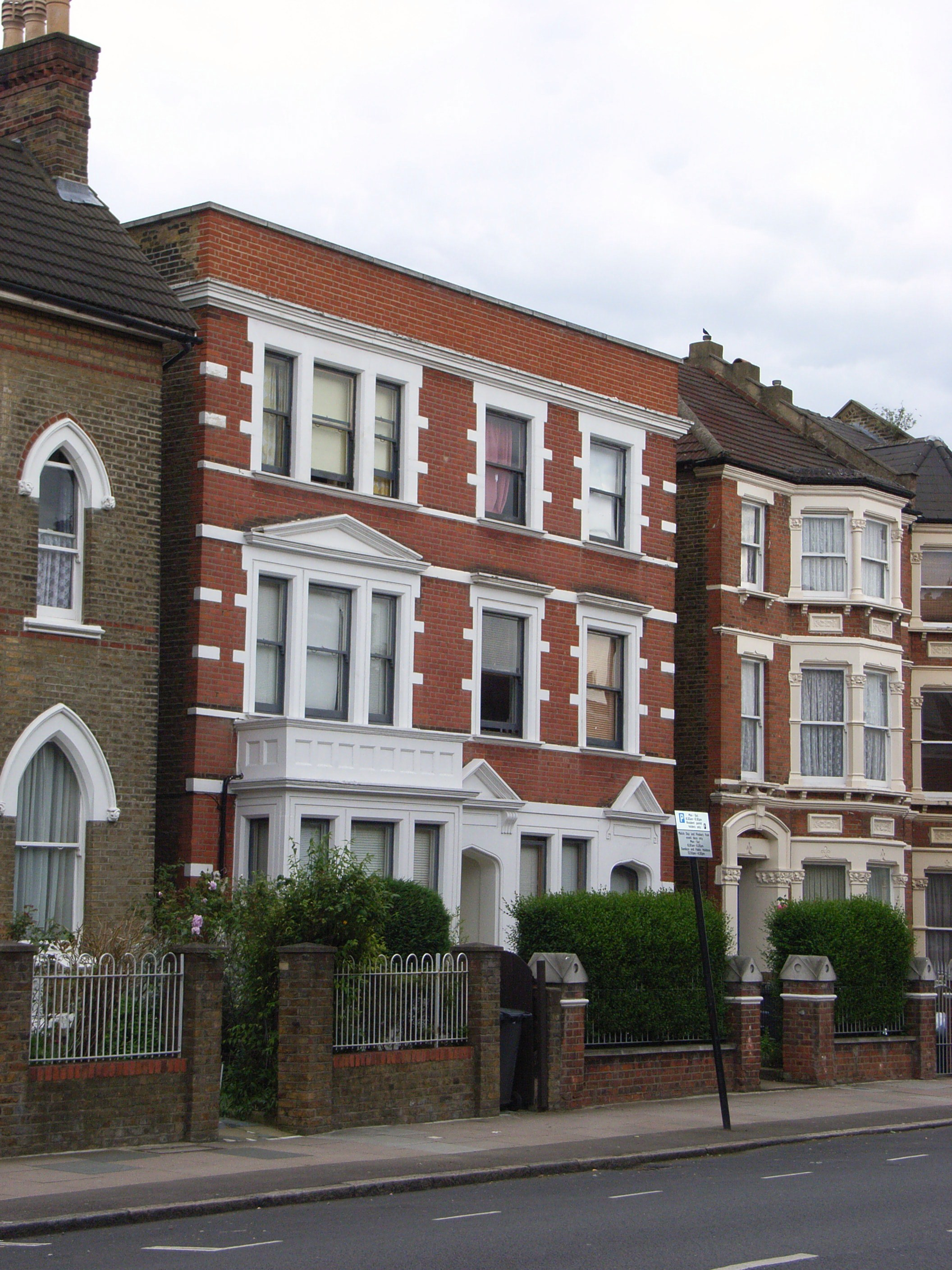
34 Stapleton Hall Road, once home to part of the Stapleton Hall Road School for Girls, as seen in May 2008

Stapleton Hall School for Girls, at no. 54 and later also at no. 34 Stapleton Hall Road, was run by the Misses Elfick from 1898 or earlier, until 1935. It seems reasonable, therefore, to conjecture that this school had moved to Stapleton Hall Road from 175 Stroud Green Road (see above).

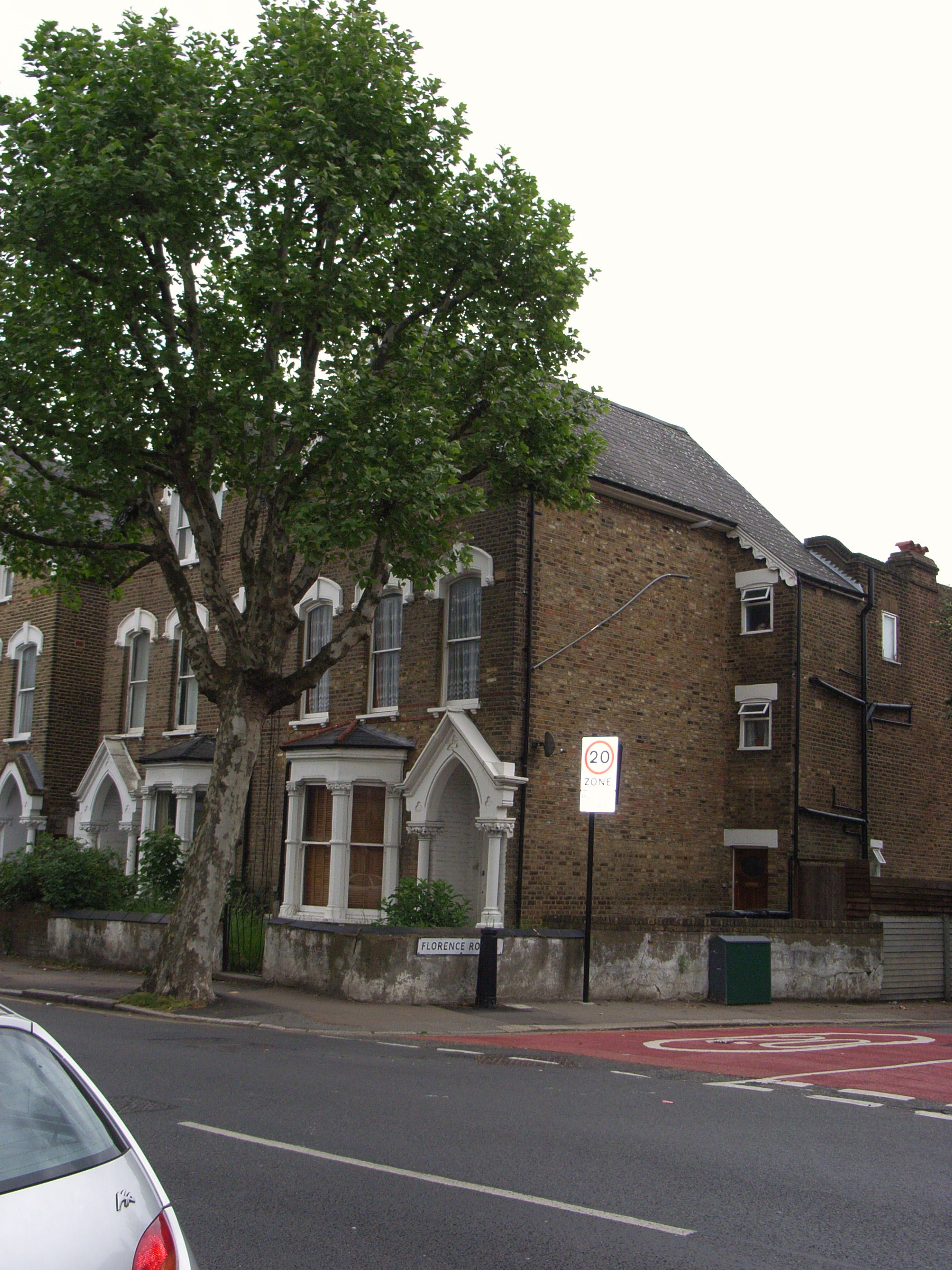
54 Stapleton Hall Road, once home to part of the Stapleton Hall Road School for Girls, as seen in May 2008.

At the northern end of Crouch Hill by 1898 there were schools at nos. 102 and 104, called Durham House and Cecile House, no. 110, preparatory and kindergarten departments of Cecile House, and no. 112, Darra House. Other schools in Stroud Green included Hornsey Rise College, Victoria Road, in 1872, Rothbury House college, for day-boys, in 1879, and Victoria College, Florence Road, in the 1880s. Frederick Newcombe, who conducted a collegiate school in Muswell Hill Road, apparently had moved from Stroud Green.

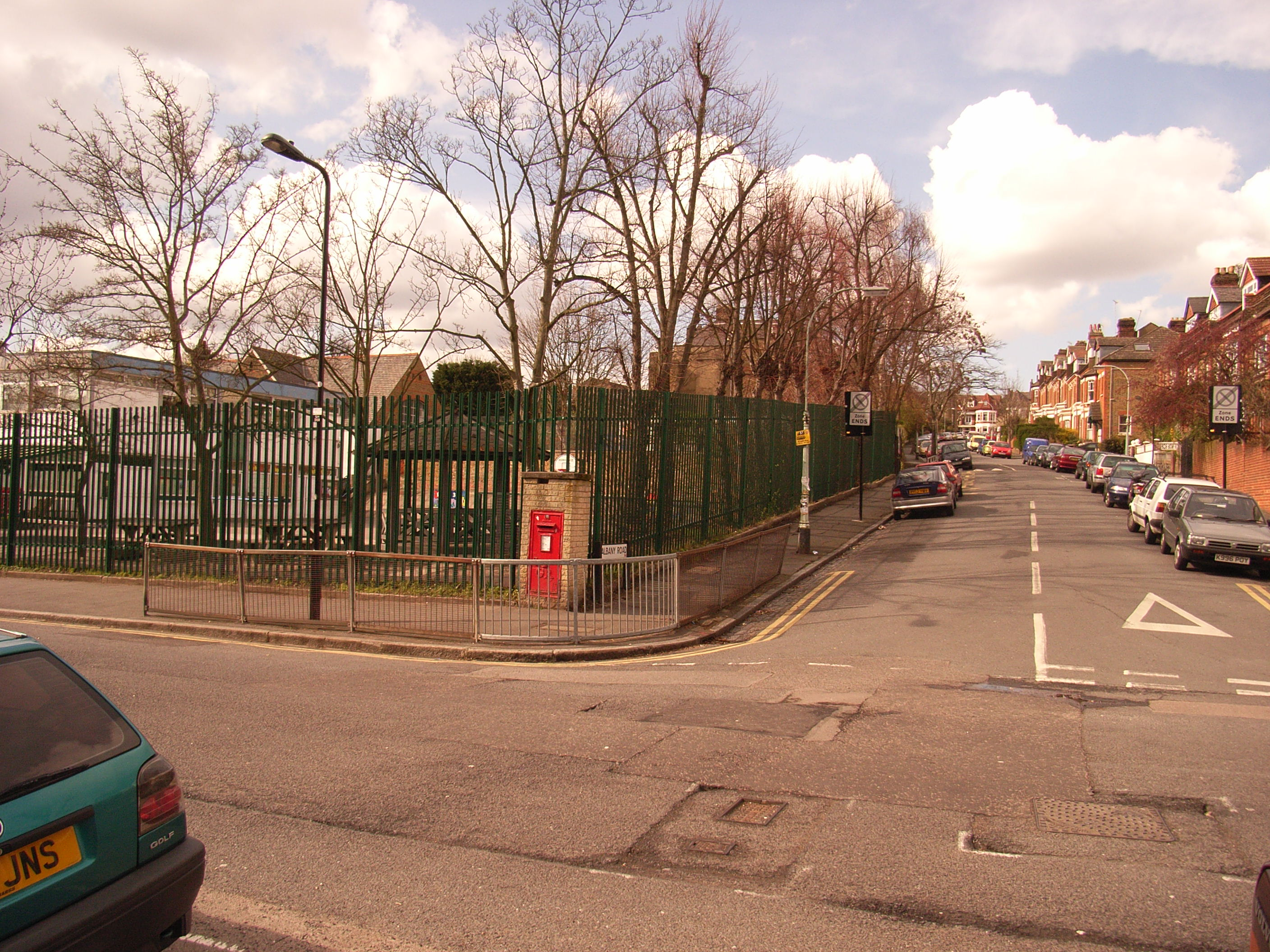
The site of the original Stroud Green and Hornsey High School for Girls is now the playground of St Aidan's primary school, as seen in March 2008

Stroud Green and Hornsey High School for Girls, was opened by the Church Schools' Co. in 1887. It occupied a cramped site, on the corner of Stapleton Hall and Albany roads, and had no playground in 1906, when there were 150 places and 111 pupils. The school, subsidized by the company to supplement the fees, was taken over by local governors in 1919 and grant aided by Middlesex County Council from 1928. It became an elementary, Voluntary Controlled school in 1948 on the removal of older girls to Hornsey High School for Girls, and was renamed St. Aidan's. A new building was opened in 1972 but the old yellow-brick hall was retained.

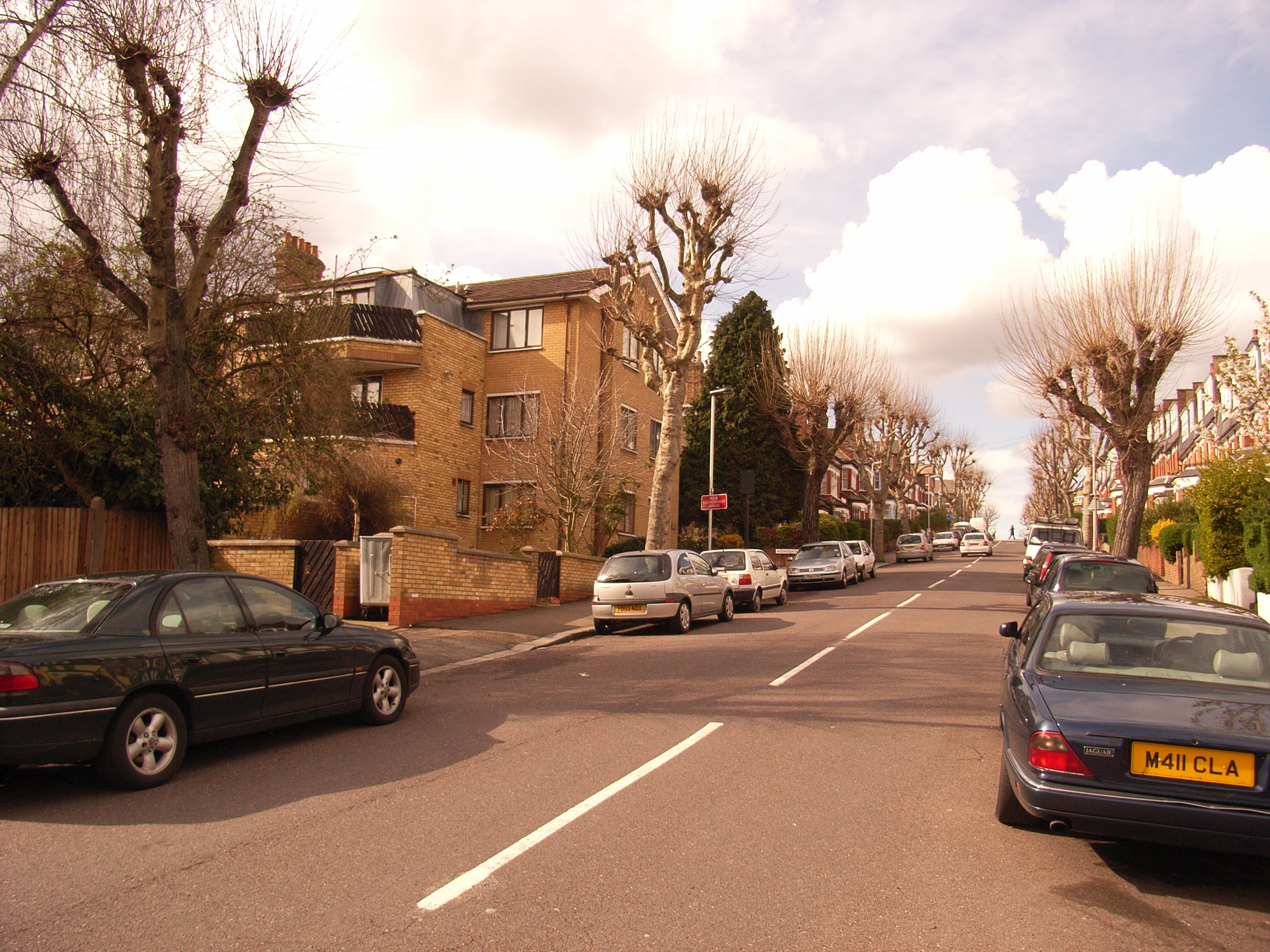
The site of the original Stroud Green (Girls) High School is now an apartment block, as seen in March 2008

The nearby Stroud Green (Girls) High School (c.1887) was a private venture established by a Mrs. Mills-Carver and comprised a new building at the corner of Addington and Oakfield roads, with its grounds backing those of the teachers' and boarders' houses. In 1906 there were 150 places and 130 pupils of all ages, including six boarders whose payments were needed for solvency. Competition with the nearby Stroud Green and Hornsey High School for Girls was mutually damaging but plans for amalgamation had to wait until 1948. Meanwhile, in 1908 Stroud Green (Girls) High School was taken over by Middlesex County Council to become Hornsey High School for Girls, a counterpart to the Stationers' (boys) School and in 1915 it moved to new buildings nearby its new partner. In 1948 it eventually succeeded in absorbing the Stroud Green and Hornsey High School for Girls, whose former site became St Aidan's primary school. In 1972 Hornsey High School for Girls became a girls comprehensive school located in entirely new premises in Crouch End, its former premises were acquired by the Stationers' school.

St. Peter-in-Chains Roman Catholic school for infants was open by 1959 in Elm Grove, close to St. Gilda's junior school. Originally independent, it was Voluntary Aided in 1969 and had 206 infants on the roll in 1975.

The position for those reliant on free education was more precarious. A report of 1890 showed that secondary education for the sons of the poor of Stroud Green was being provided by local churches. A grammar school for 'sons of parents of limited means' occupied an iron room adjoining Holy Trinity church, Stroud Green, in 1890. It had a junior department in 1909, when prospectuses were available at the Vicarage. A Baptist grammar school used the Victoria Hall, Stapleton Hall Road, also in 1890.

Until the end of the 19th century there was no free, State provision in Stroud Green for younger children. Indeed, in 1890 middle-class families around Oakfield Road opposed any public elementary school. Similar hostility was later shown on the Harringay Park estate, where house purchasers were not told by the British Land Co. that the local school board as early as 1883 had bought a site between Falkland and Frobisher roads. Attacked by builders and householders in both areas and by the vicars of St. Paul's and Holy Trinity, the board wavered throughout the 1880s. Meanwhile, elementary-age Stroud Green children were forced to attend schools in neighbouring education authorities, becoming known as 'border children'. Tottenham had over 100 Hornsey pupils in 1889 the problem of 'border children' grew worse, and the London board eventually refused admission to 200 Stroud Green pupils in 1892, prompting the Education Department to remonstrate with Hornsey.

Stroud Green Board School eventually opened in temporary buildings in Stroud Green Road in 1894. From 1896 it used a new building in Woodstock Road, with accommodation for 1,351 boys, girls, and infants on separate floors. It was designed by Arnold Mitchell and A. M. Butler and built by Kirk & Randall building contractors. There were 1,052 places by 1932, when the school was reorganized into a senior mixed or secondary modern school with 346 places, a junior mixed with 408, and an infants' with 344. The seniors were later absorbed into Bishopswood, leaving the board's building to Stroud Green junior and infants' schools, with 320 and 180 children on their rolls in 1975.

Under the Education Act 1902 Hornsey became a Part III authority, responsible for elementary education. The new education committee, met from 1903 until 1920 at no. 206 Stapleton Hall Road. The committee took pride in relatively small classes, taught only by qualified teachers with good salaries. It vainly sought responsibility for secondary education in 1904 and conducted its own census into the needs of children beyond the age of 15 in 1905–6. Finding that provision was dependent on private schools, Hornsey co-operated closely with Middlesex County Council in taking over and enlarging the poorer ones. Funds from the Pauncefort charity were available from 1903 to support three, later five, girls at secondary schools and a further income was derived from the Hornsey educational foundation. Advanced courses were introduced at elementary schools, Stroud Green and South Harringay, in 1920 and extended in 1923.

=== Education today ===
For details of education in Stroud Green, London see the London Borough of Haringey article.

== Religion ==
=== Anglicans ===
The first Anglican church of Holy Trinity, Stroud Green, was built in stages between 1880 and 1885 on the corner of Granville and Stapleton Hall roads, and replaced a crowded temporary hall. Holy Trinity, Stroud Green had become a separate district in 1881, assigned from the chapelries of Holy Innocents and St. John and from Hornsey parish.

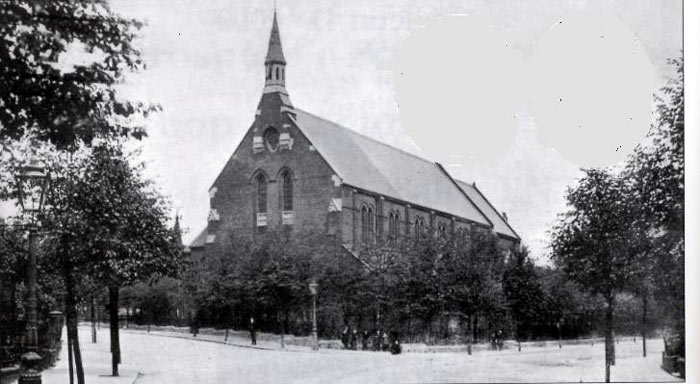
The original Holy Trinity, Stroud Green

Designed in a 13th-century style by B. E. Ferrey (son of the more well known architect Benjamin Ferrey), it was of brick with stone dressings and had a nave, south aisles, transepts, vestry, south porch, and west spirelet.

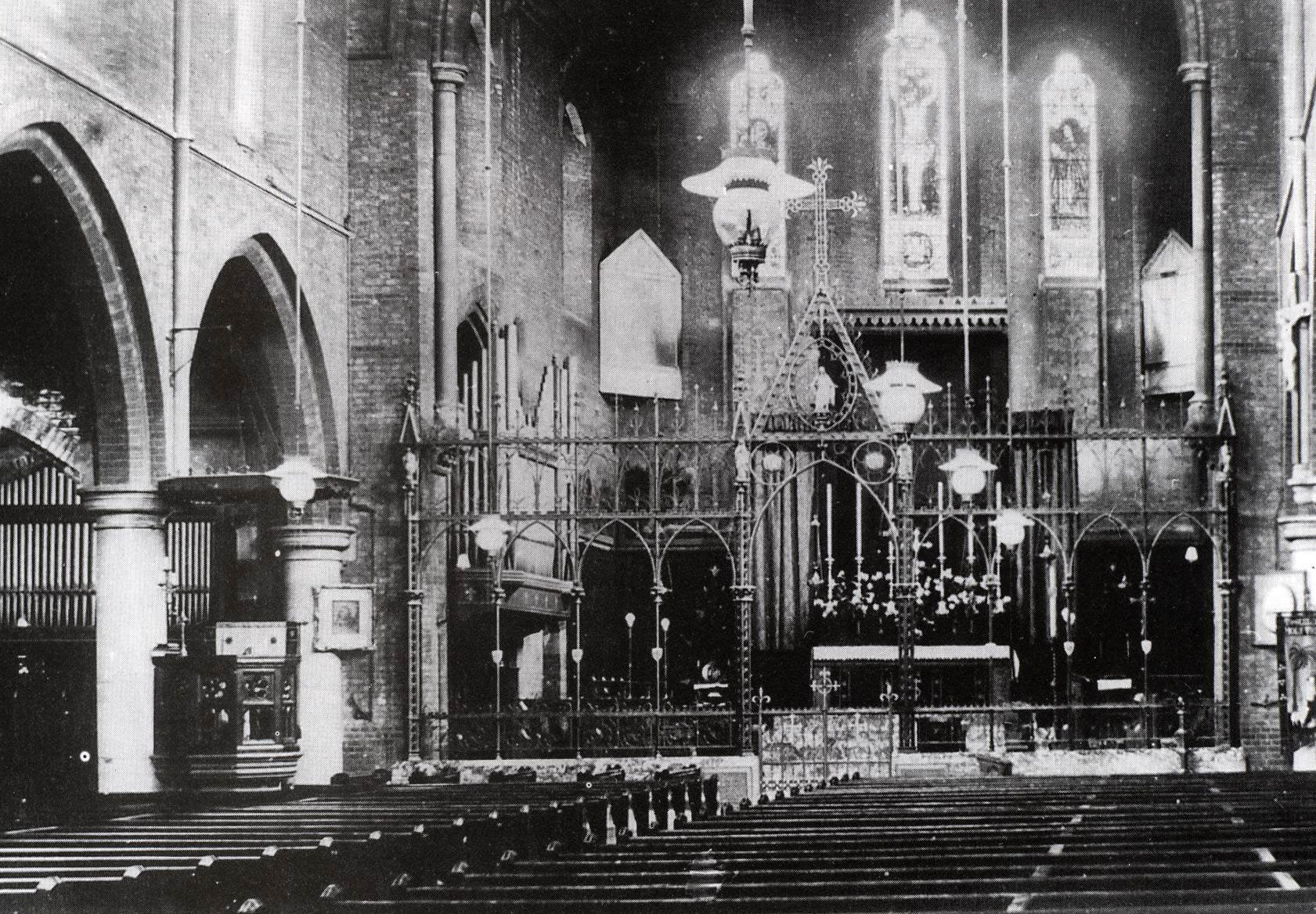
Interior view of the west end of the original Holy Trinity, Stroud Green

Although built at only moderate cost, the interior was dignified and spacious. There were 1,200 seats in 1903, when a morning service was attended by 1,051 and an evening service by 1,210. Following war damage the church was declared unsafe c.1951 and pulled down in 1960. The site was re-used for a hall, Vicarage, and public garden.

The adjoining red-brick hall (1913) by J. S. Alder, in Granville Road, was adapted as the church, with a western portico and spirelet. The church's organ went to Saint Andrew's, Surbiton.

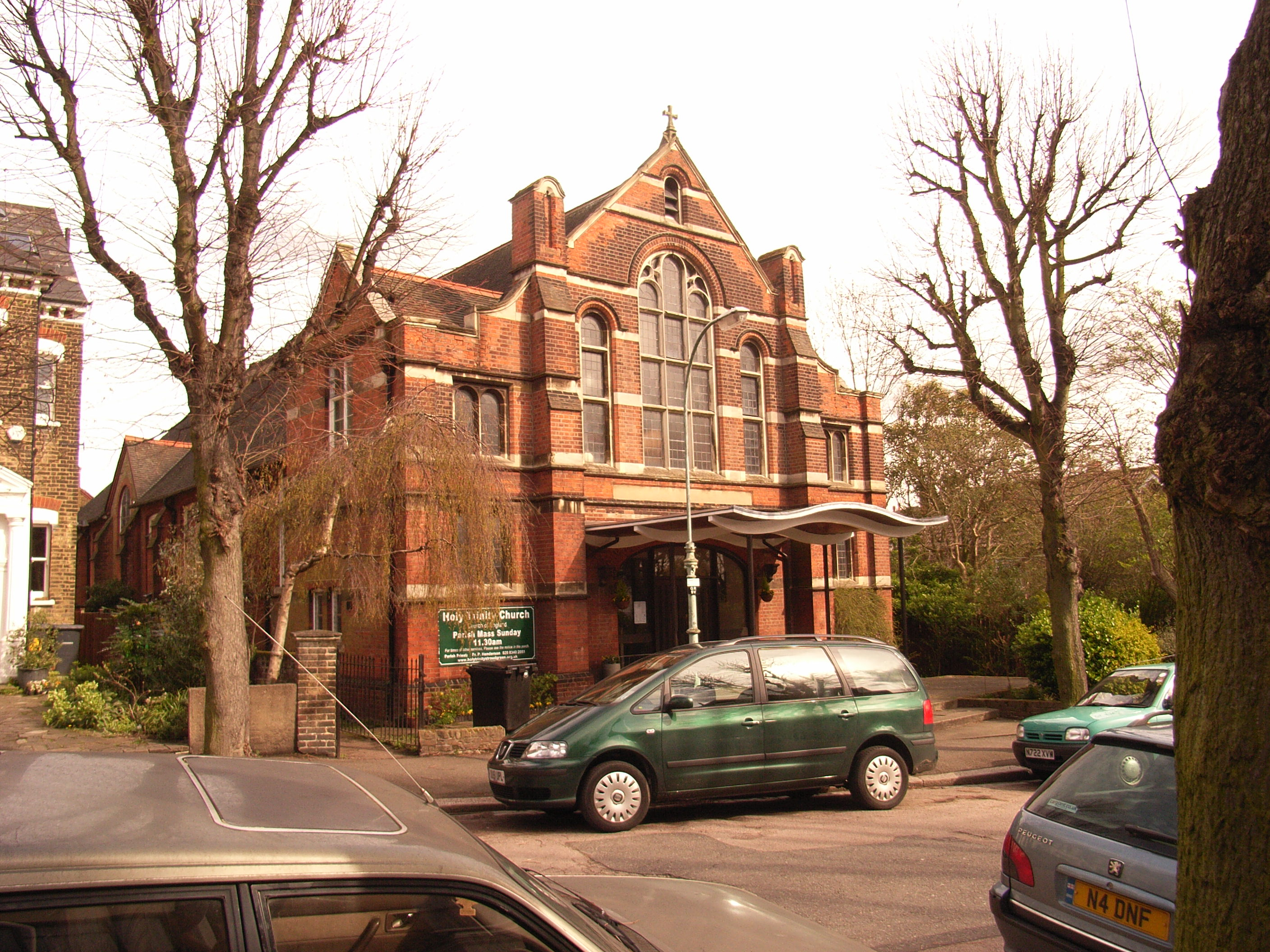
Holy Trinity church, Granville Road, as seen in March 2008

The congregation was evangelical in 1885, when 2,266 signatories opposed the presentation of the ritualist, Dr. Robert Linklater, vicar 1885–1911. By 1888, however, Holy Trinity was the only Hornsey church with Anglo-Catholic services. The church continues to be firmly within the catholic tradition of the Church of England, as to which see the church's website (below).

The current parish boundaries were fixed in the 1980s when the benefice of Holy Trinity, Stroud Green was merged with that of the now defunct St Luke's, Hornsey.

The patron is the Bishop of London.

=== Baptists ===
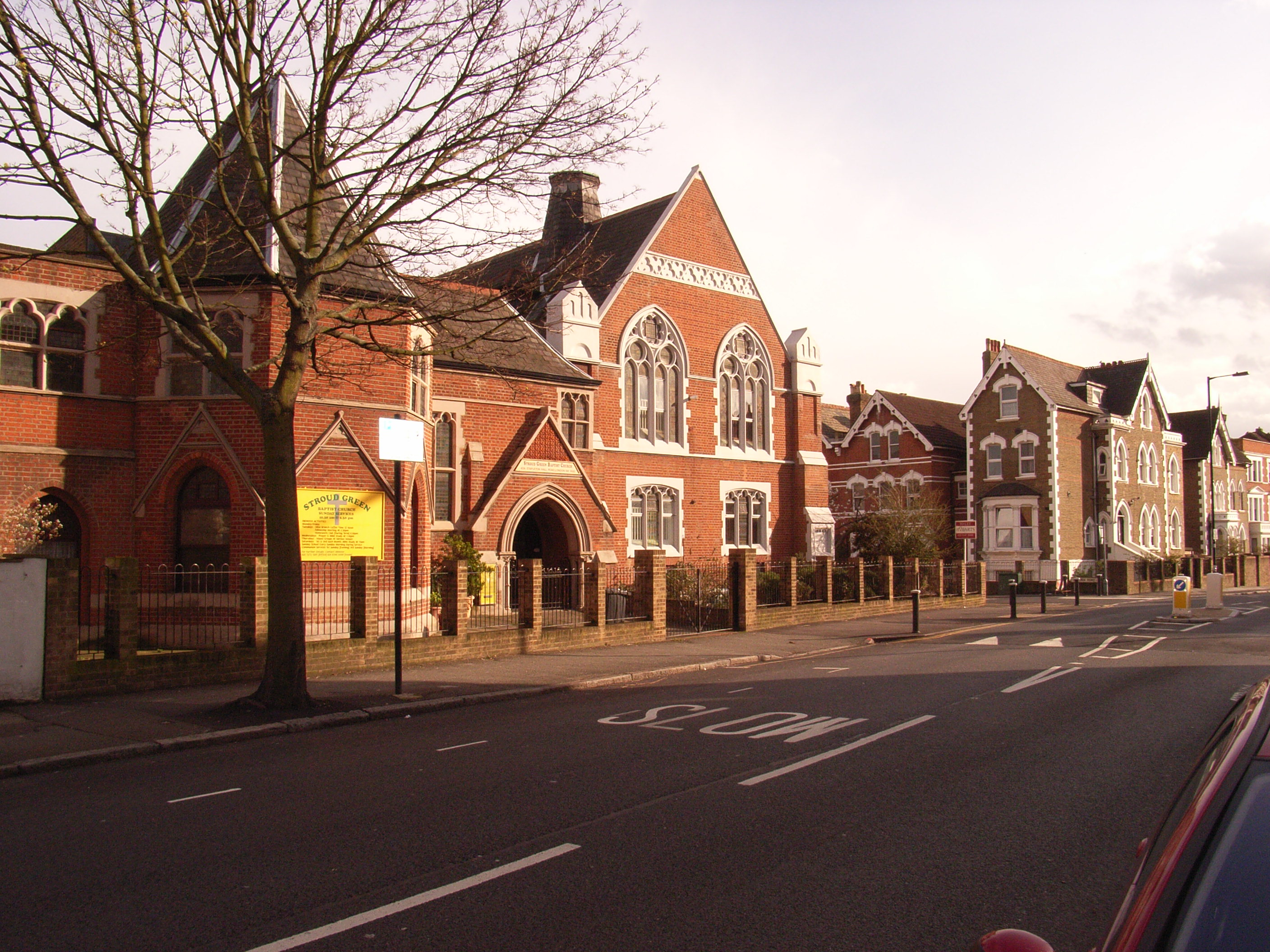
Stroud Green Baptist chapel, Stapleton Hall Road, as seen in March 2008

The Stroud Green Baptist chapel, in Stapleton Hall Road, was established in 1878 and registered as Crouch Hill Chapel by Particular Baptists in 1884. A red-brick building designed by J. Wallis Chapman in the Early Geometric style, with adjoining halls, was opened in 1889. There were 280 worshippers in the morning and 396 in the evening on one Sunday in 1903. There were 475 seats in 1928, by which date the church had joined the London Baptist Association, and 460 in 1975. The chapel has since been converted into leasehold apartments known as Old Church Court, with the chapel having moved its worship into what was once the chapel's hall.

=== Roman Catholics ===
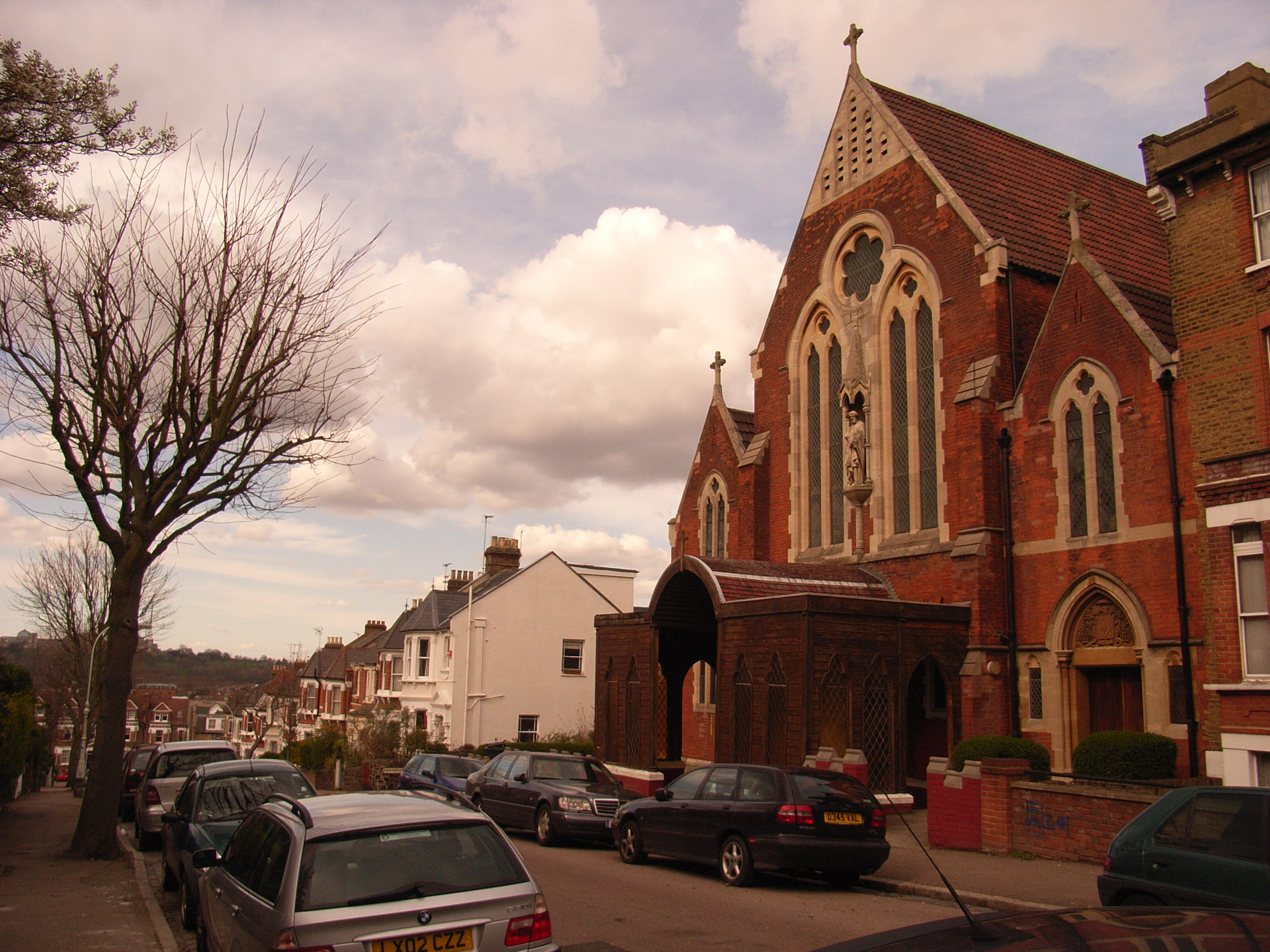
St Peter-in-Chains Catholic church, Womersley Road, as seen in March 2008

In 1893 some Roman Catholic residents of Stroud Green formed the Stroud Green Catholic Association, and began to raise funds for a church. Coombe House, at the corner of Womersley and Dashwood roads, was bought in 1894, when mass was celebrated there. It was designated St. Augustine's, since canons regular of St. Augustine were intended to serve the mission, but was soon committed to canons regular of the Lateran, who changed the name to St. Peter-in-Chains. A red-brick church, in a Gothic style, was founded in 1898 and completed in 1902. There were attendances of 473 in the morning and 125 in the evening on one Sunday in 1903. The church was still served by canons regular of the Lateran in 1976. The parish is now served by Westminster diocesan clergy.

=== Ceylon and India General Mission ===
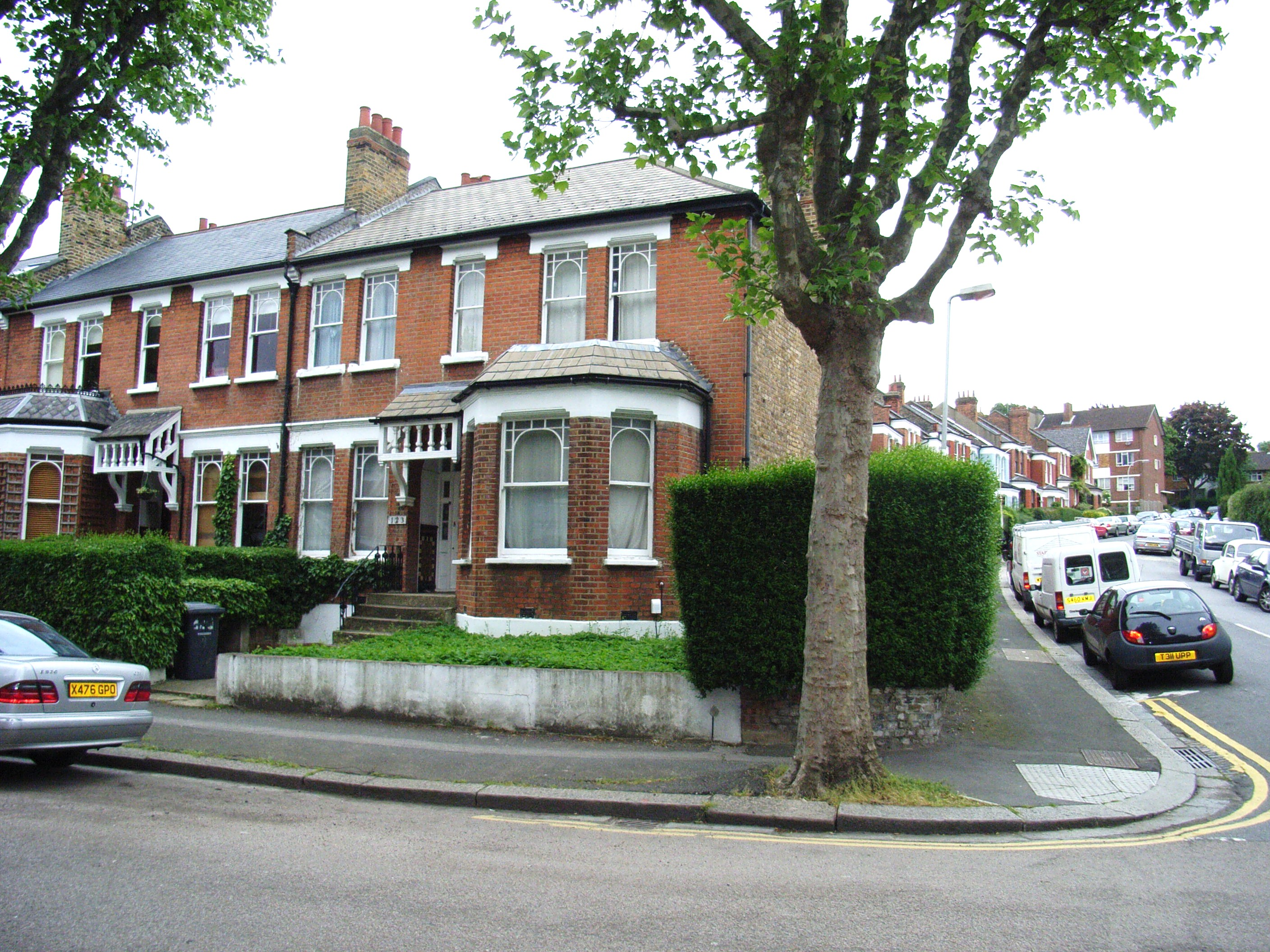
The former offices of the Ceylon and India General Mission, as seen in May 2008

In 1912, no. 121 Stapleton Hall Road, at the junction with Elyne Road, was a registered office of the Ceylon and India Mission (Secretary, David Gardiner).

=== Christian Scientists ===
Christian Scientists were meeting at no. 137 Stroud Green Road from c.1912 until 1923.

After this date, and until the Second World War, they seem to have met at nos. 60 or 58 Crouch Hill .

In 1936 there was also a Christian Scientist reading room at no. 13 Topsfield Parade, Crouch End.

=== Congregationalists ===
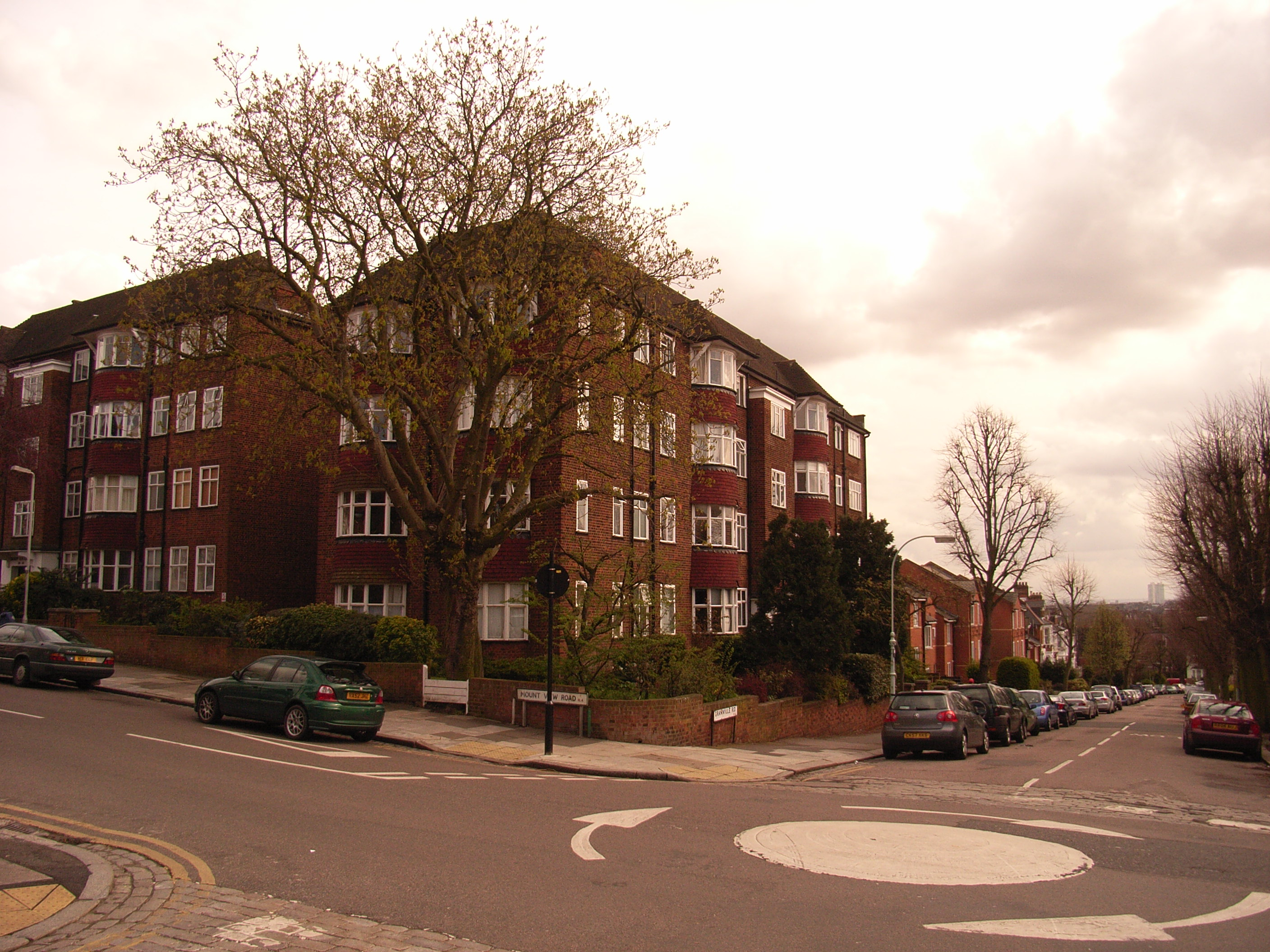
The site of the Stroud Green Congregational church at the crossing of Granville Road and Mount View Road, as seen in March 2008

A Congregational church was founded to serve Stroud Green, on land at the corner of Mount View Road and Granville Roads, which was acquired with help from the local Park, Highgate, and Tollington Park Congregational chapels.

A hall was opened in 1887 and used for worship until the completion of a building in the Decorated style, of red brick faced with terracotta, which in 1893 was to seat 1,000.

The pastorate was said to be prosperous and on one Sunday in 1903 there were attendances of 330 in the morning and 231 in the evening. The church was closed and demolished in 1935.

=== Plymouth Brethren ===
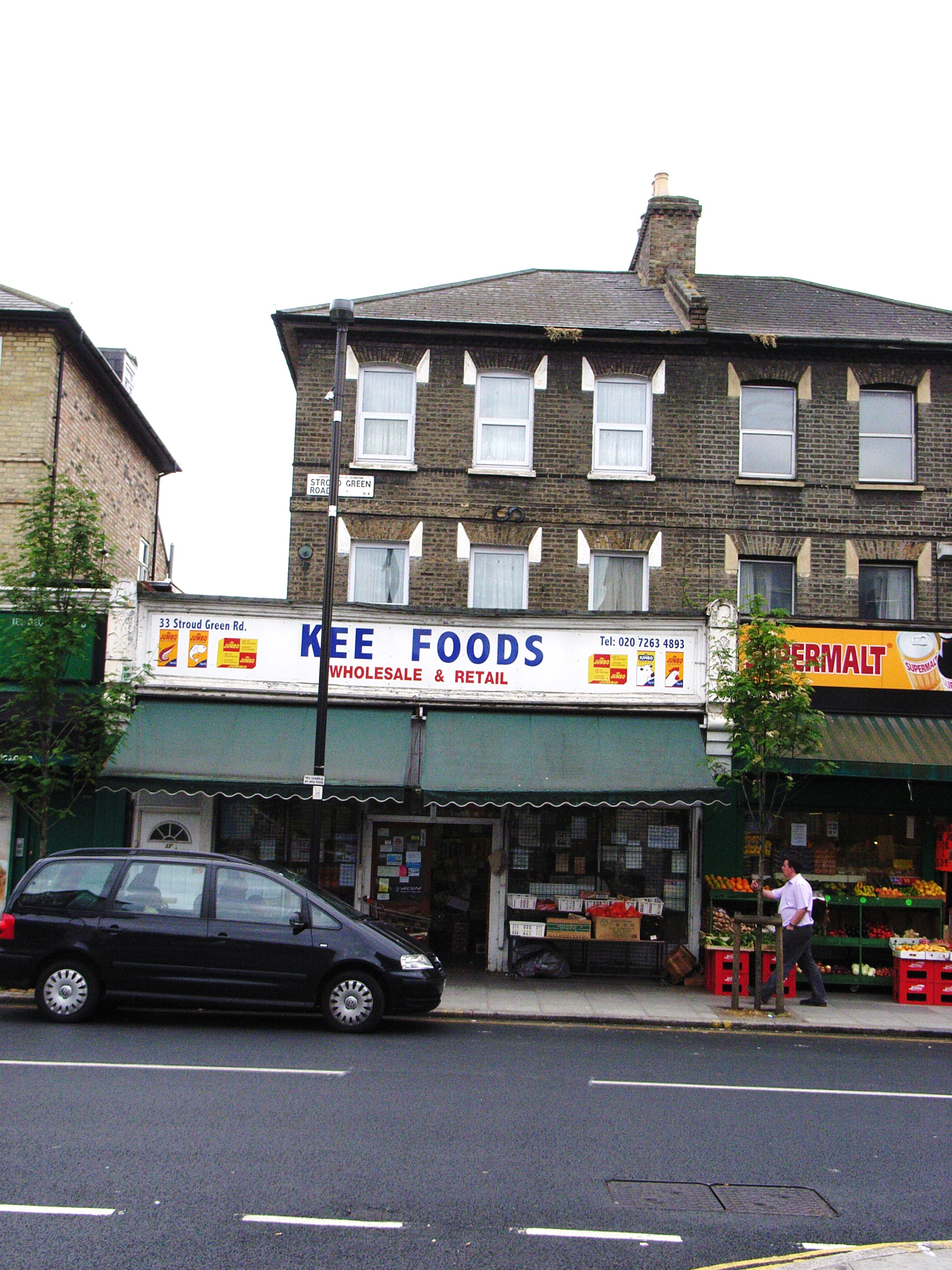
The location of the former Plymouth Brethren Finsbury Park Mission, as it appeared in May 2008

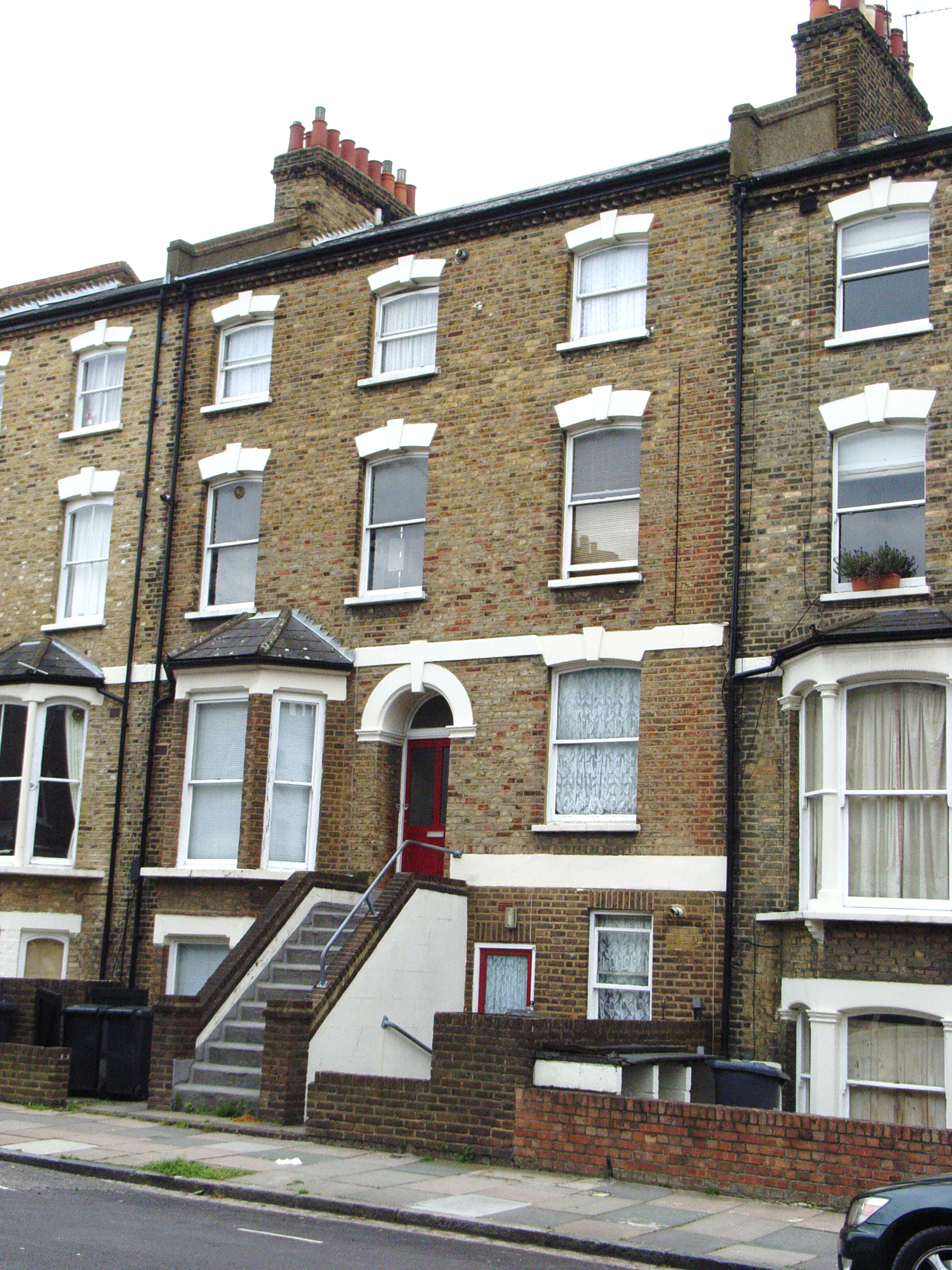
The location of the former Plymouth Brethren meeting place, in Woodstock Road, as seen in May 2008

In 1903 Plymouth Brethren met at no. 45 Woodstock Road, with morning attendances of 85 and 43 and evening attendances of 68 and 32 respectively.

Smaller groups worshipped at no. 33 Stroud Green Road, in premises occupied by a Mrs Harding, and recorded in the census of 1911 as the Finsbury Park Mission.

== Interesting buildings ==
=== Coal Office ===
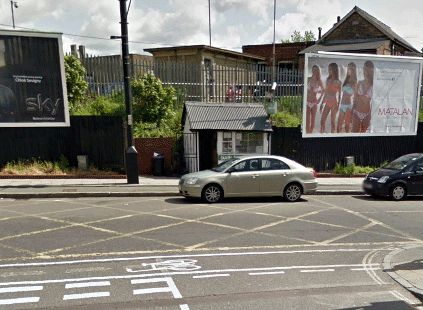
The last surviving coal office on the Stroud Green Road, opposite Wells Terrace, as seen in autumn 2012

In the days before gas and electric central heating, when coal fires were the principal source of heating, local householders and businesses could place orders for coke and coal at small offices like this, which were once a common sight near railway stations and railway yards. This former coal office is now (2013) the office for a local minicab business.

=== Covered Reservoir ===
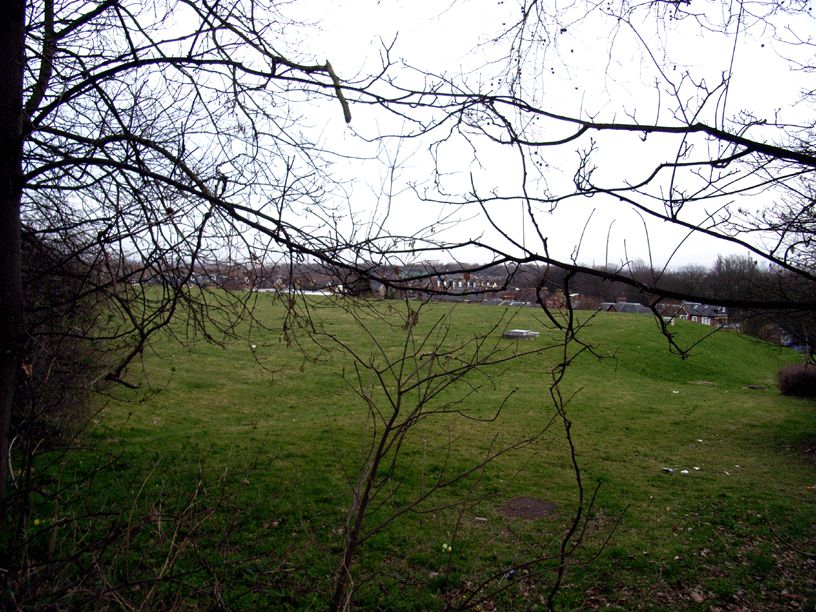
Looking south-east across London from above the Stroud Green covered reservoir, as seen in March 2009.

Datable roughly from its first known reference in a local directory in 1885, the covered reservoir that abuts the Hog's Back ridge, just below its crest at Mount View Road, provides Stroud Green with a fantastic vantage point to look out high over London, eastwards towards the Thames estuary and south towards Crystal Palace. In recent times (March 2007) the space has been the subject of (ultimately unsuccessful) attempts to place a mobile-phone mast on it.

=== Dairy ===
This building on the corner of Hanley Road and Crouch Hill, now a pub, was once owned by the Friern Manor Dairy Company as a development of the site that they already owned.

The minutes of the London County Council's Building Act Committee record:

That the application of Mr J Young & Co, on behalf of the Friern Manor Dairy Farm Co Ltd, for the consent of the Council for the erection of an addition to the rear of number 127 Hanley Road, Stroud Green, to abut on Crouch Hill, be granted subject to the condition that the addition therein referred to be commenced within six months and completed within 18 months from the 30 day of September 1890.

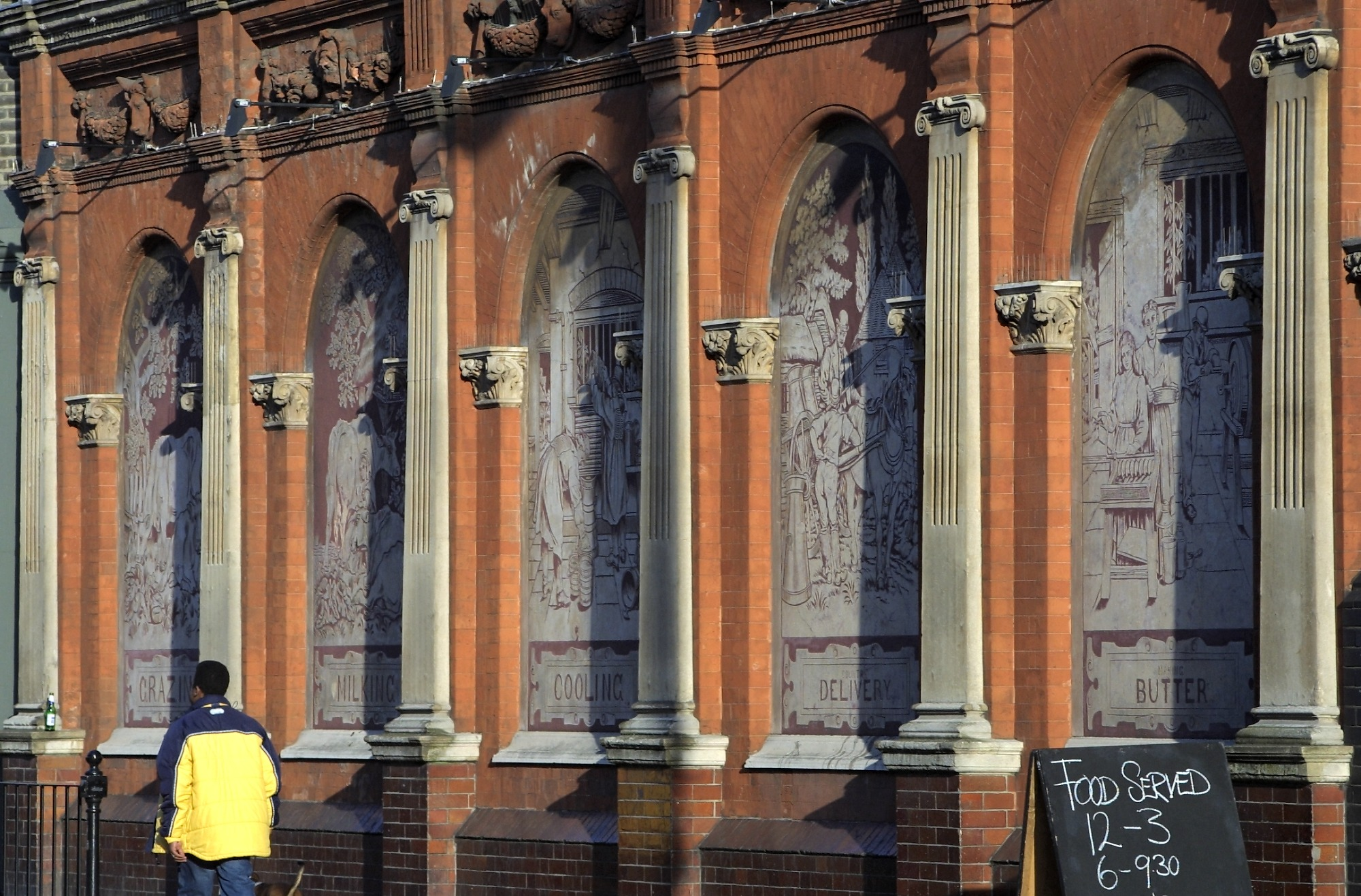
The Old Dairy, Stroud Green, as seen in the summer of 2006

The exterior wall that faces onto Crouch Hill, comprises a remarkable set of seven, unique, anonymous sgraffito panels (c.1890), with picturesque illustrations of: Milk Delivery (ancient); Milk Delivery (modern); In the Country; Milk Cooling; Making Butter; Milling; Grazing.

=== Stapleton Hall ===
Stapleton Hall is situated on Stapleton Hall Road near the junction with Hanley Road, Stroud Green Road, Mount Pleasant Crescent and Crouch Hill.

There are two quite different opinions about the ownership of this building. The older opinion, first published in the Gentleman's Magazine of November 1784 states that the Stapeleton Hall took its name from having been the property of and residence of Sir Thomas Stapleton.

A subsequent history of Islington published in 1811, elaborates this notion, stating:

there is an old farm house called Stapleton Hall, and which was formerly the property and residence of Sir Thomas Stapleton, of Grey's Court, in the county of Oxon, Bart. an antient family, remarkable for the number of eminent men it has produced. In the building are his initials, with those of his wife, and the date 1609.

This story is further explored in the Victoria County History (op.cit), which states that the building was first mentioned in 1577, and was extended or rebuilt in 1609 by Sir Thomas Stapleton whose initials appeared on date stones and panelling. The Victoria County History also asserts that a Sir William Stapleton, Bt., was the landowner until his death in 1745, and the property then apparently passed to Sir Thomas Stapleton, Bt. (d. 1781).

A more recent opinion, expressed in the March 2010 Bulletin of the Hornsey Historical Society, using more archival and architectural evidence, makes a compelling case that the original owners of the property were in fact the Draper family, already local landowners (see the section on Local landownership, above).

As has been shown in the section above, about the Corporation of Stroud Green, by the 1760s the building was in use as a tavern, sometimes known as The Green Man.

In 1759 the death of the landlord was reported:

Mr Rogers, master of the Green Man at Stroud Green. As he was riding thro' Islington he dropt from his horse, and expired immediately.
Universal Chronicle or Weekly Gazette (London) Saturday 9 June 1759; Issue 63)

In August 1769 it was announced that the tenant, a Mrs. Rogers (who was presumably the widow of Mr Rogers), was to auction the contents, which gives us a nice impression of the place:

All the genuine Household Furniture, Fixtures &c, belonging to Mrs. Rogers, at the Green Man at Stroud Green, near Mount Pleasant, in the parish of Hornsey; consisting of 14 bedsteads with furnitures, featherbeds and bedding to ditto, two eight-day clocks, a large quantity of kitchen furniture, a brewing copper, and the utensils of the brew-house, sundry ranges, and other fixtures, two carts, three fine cows, two pigs and sundry other effects.
(Gazetteer and New Daily Advertiser (London) Saturday 26 August 1769; Issue 12 632)

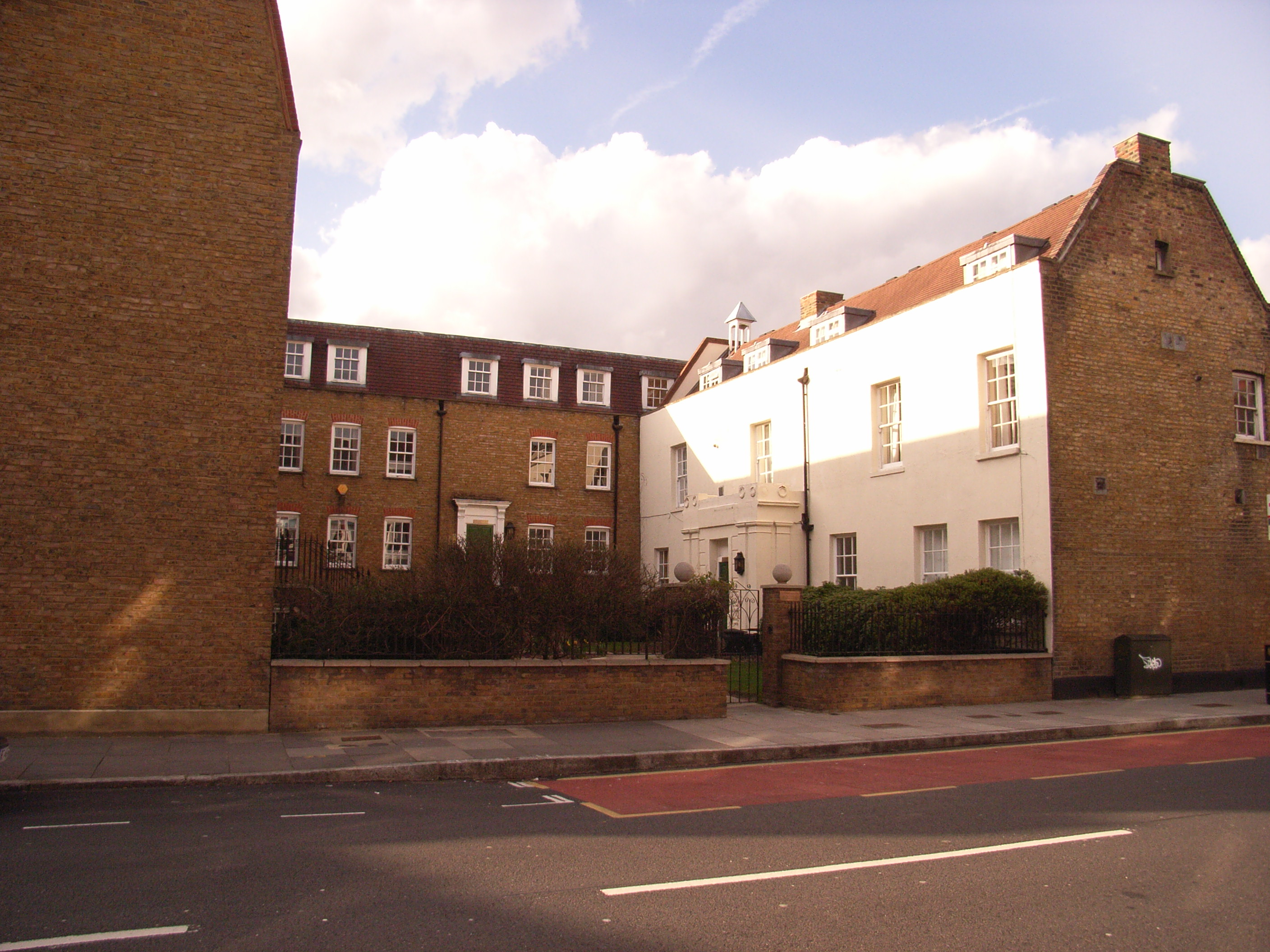
Stapleton Hall as it appeared in April 2008, the original building now painted white.

At some point before 1776 it appears to have been functioning as a farm for then a sale notice states:

Messr ELDERTON give notice, that the Lease of the Farm, late Mr Seddon's, jun. known by the name of Stapleton Hall at Stroud Green near Holloway, between Islington and Highgate, will be put up for sale [...] after which will follow the dispersal of the horses, cows, hogs, farming utensils, and three very large ricks of extraordinary fine hay. The sale of furniture will begin precisely at 11 o'clock.
(Morning Chronicle and London Advertiser (London) Thursday, 7 November 1776; Issue 2330)

This history is reflected in the 1811 history of Islington which states that at Stroud Green:

an old farm house called Stapleton Hall [...] was afterwards converted into a publick house, and within memory had in front the following inscription: Ye are welcome all To Stapleton Hall. Mr. William Lucas is the present occupier of the house, together with a farm of more than 80 acres (320,000 m^{2}) of land contiguous thereto.

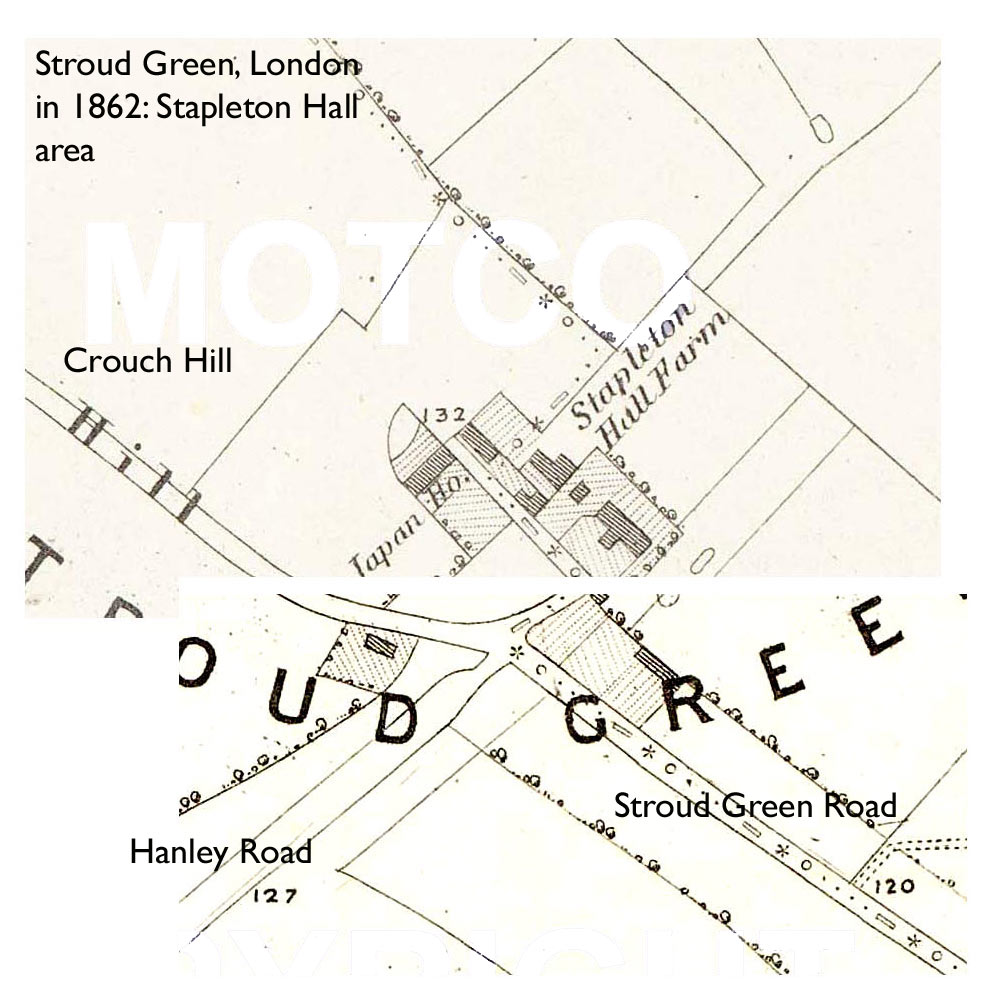
The Stapleton Hall area of Stroud Green in 1862, from the map by Edward Stanford

Certainly, press announcements in the later 18th century indicate that Stapleton Hall farm was the venue for a number of agricultural auction sales, mostly of hay and field crops such as oats and barley, and occasionally of farm equipment and furniture. However, from these references it is not possible to know if these last items were the property of the tenants of Stapleton Hall or of nearby properties.

Between 1856 and 1884 Stapleton Hall was occupied by Charles Turner (d.1892), member of a prominent farming family and later of nearby Womersley House. The hall had become the Stroud Green Conservative club by 1888, and in 1962 was bought by the club, which still occupied it in 1978. In the 1980s it was noted that early-17th century panelling had been reset in a short back wing, and parts of the building may be of that date. The main range is probably 18th-century but was re-fronted in the early- or mid-19th century. More recent alterations have included the demolition of an annexe towards the street and the addition of a modern clubroom at the rear.

The house has since been much altered and converted into leasehold apartments, with more newly built in the grounds. Gillian Tindall's book Three Houses, Many Lives (2012) describes the history of the house in detail.

=== The telephone exchange ===
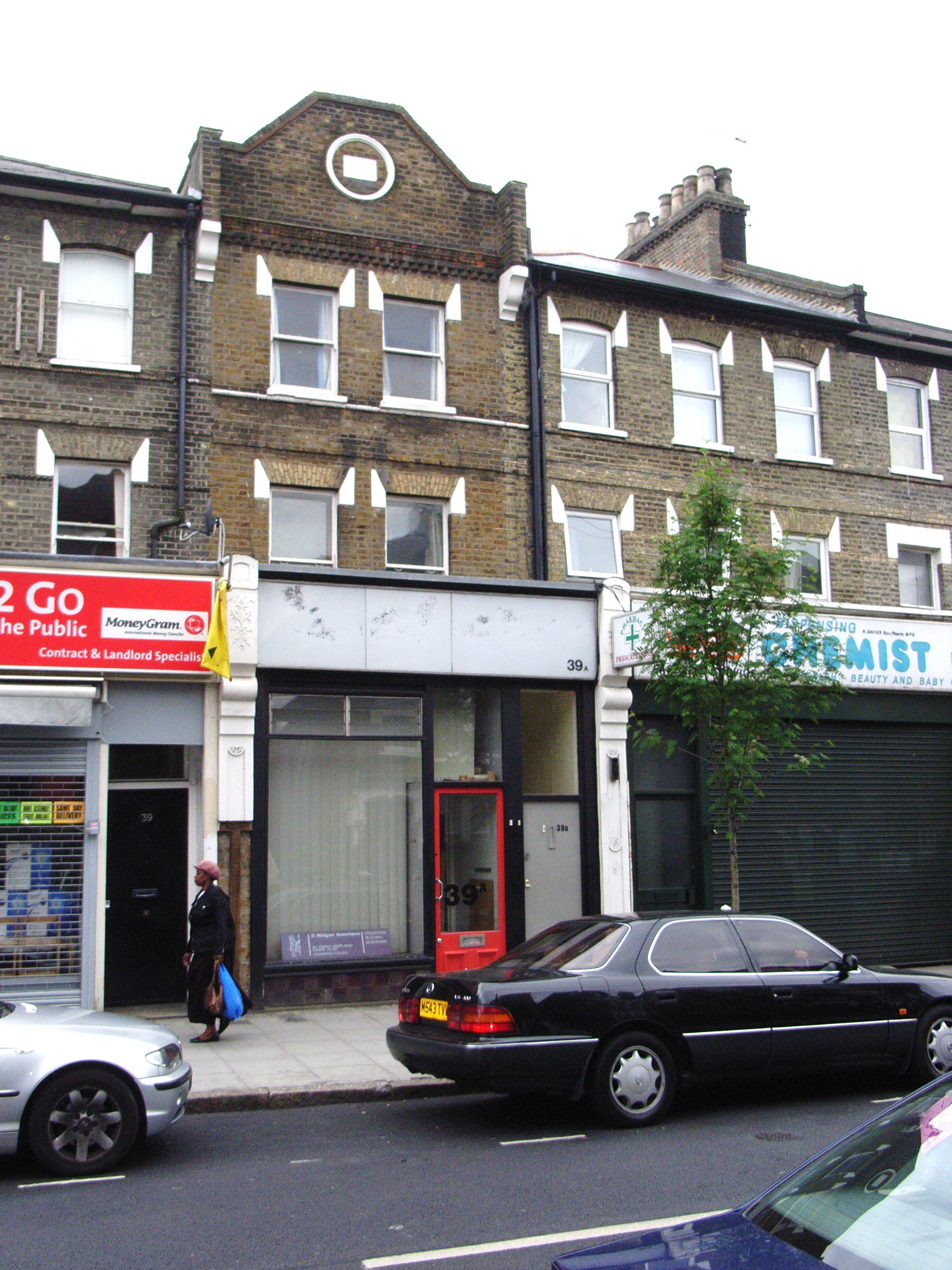
The old Stroud Green telephone exchange (1911) as it appeared in May 2008

No 39^{A} Stroud Green Road, despite the fact that it bears the date 1896, was actually built in 1911, filling a gap between the adjacent, previously detached buildings. It is the site of the former National Telephone Company's local exchange, and public call office; an essential public amenity in the days before widespread domestic telephone ownership.

== Interesting (but absent) Buildings ==
=== 1 Ferme Park Road ===
The former Triangle Restaurant as seen early 2016, prior to the site's redevelopment after October 2016. The history of this building is unclear, but may relate to the adjacent (now defunct) railway; see above 'Railways'.

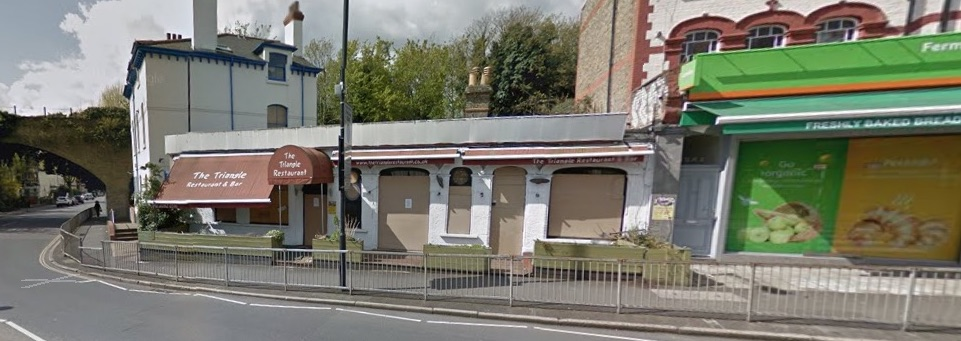
1 Ferme Park Road as seen prior to the site being redeveloped from October 2016 onwards.

=== Scala Cinema ===
North of the present-day Wells Terrace bus terminus at Finsbury Park station, is a small industrial estate that replaced the former Great Northern Railway Coal and Goods depot.

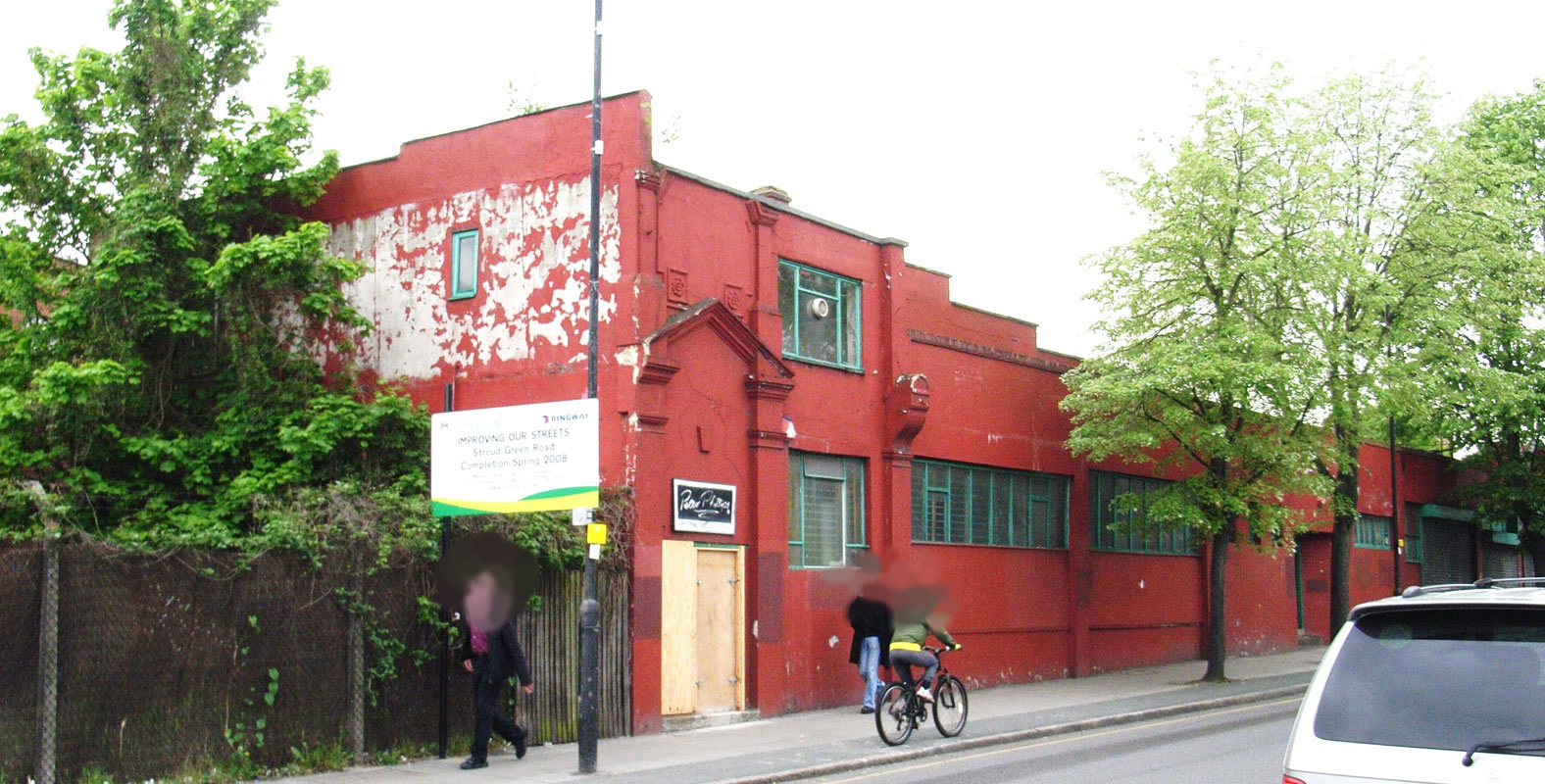
The Scala Cinema (1914), Stroud Green, as it appeared in April 2008.

The old brick building that was immediately on Stroud Green Road (officially 15 The Parade) and until 2008 in use as a factory trading under the name Peter Phillips, was the Scala Cinema (architect H. W. Horsley). It opened in 1914 (replacing the former Stroud Green Hall), and sat 700 people. The auditorium ran parallel with the road, with the rake provided by the gentle, natural drop of the land. In 1920 it was renamed the New Scala Cinema, but closed in 1924.

Since closing as a cinema the building had a chequered history: billiard hall, wartime factory, Irish dancing school, and whist hall, before being turned to light industrial use. It was suddenly demolished without any "fuss" in June 2008. The site is now (April 2013) a block of flats with a Sainsbury's supermarket beneath.

=== Stapleton Hall Road Coal Offices ===
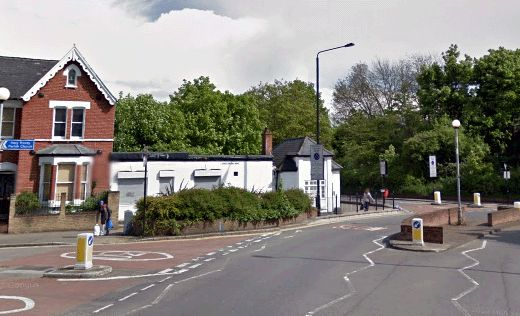
Seen from Ferme Park Road

These former coal offices on a railway bridge over the Gospel Oak to Barking railway (at the junction of Stapleton Hall Road and Ferme Park Road) were in use until recently as a small dwelling house and a cobblers' shop. They were demolished in autumn 2012 to be replaced by new housing.

=== Stroud Green Assembly Rooms ===
On 19 November 1895, the London County Council Committee for Theatres and Music Halls refused an application from a Mr A. Bedborough, on behalf of Mr W. Andrews, to build:

a concert hall in Stroud Green, on the north-west side of Stapleton-hall-road, Stroud Green, with three shops at the rear to abut upon Mount Pleasant road [...] as no open spaces are shown to be provided at the rear of the intended shops [...] but that the applicant be informed that a further application for consent to the frontage only of the building might be favourably considered.
The Era (London) Saturday 30 November 1895; Issue 2984)

It would seem that nothing more was heard until 17 March 1896 when, at a meeting of the same committee, several sets of drawings were submitted as plans for the 'assembly rooms or concert hall' to be built:

at Stroud Green between Stapleton Hall road and Mount Pleasant road. The premises would consist, on the ground floor of four shops, and on the first floor of a hall for which it was intended to apply for a music and dancing licence. The shops would have fireproof ceilings constructed of rolled iron joist and concrete separating them from the hall, which would have seating capacity for 280 persons. There would be two staircases delivering from the hall, one into Stapleton Hall road, and the other into Mount Pleasant road.
The Era (London, England), Saturday, 21 March 1896; Issue 3000

A similar notice appeared in the same newspaper, shortly afterwards, on 4 April 1896. On both occasions it was clear that the building works were to be carried out within six months.

It is evident from the plans, now in the London Metropolitan Archives, Clerkenwell, EC1. that the still-standing, gabled building with the ground-floor curved shop front was already in existence at the time of the proposed development, shown as belonging to Mr Tanner. However, the red brick buildings immediately behind do seem from the plans, to be part of the eventually incomplete development of the Assembly Rooms.

==== Plans for the Stroud Green Assembly Rooms ====
Proposed plan of first floor, c.1895

Proposed plan of ground floor, c.1895

Proposed elevation behind Mr Tanner's building

Block plan of the proposed site for the Assembly Rooms, c.1895

Proposed elevation facing Stapleton Hall Road, c.1895

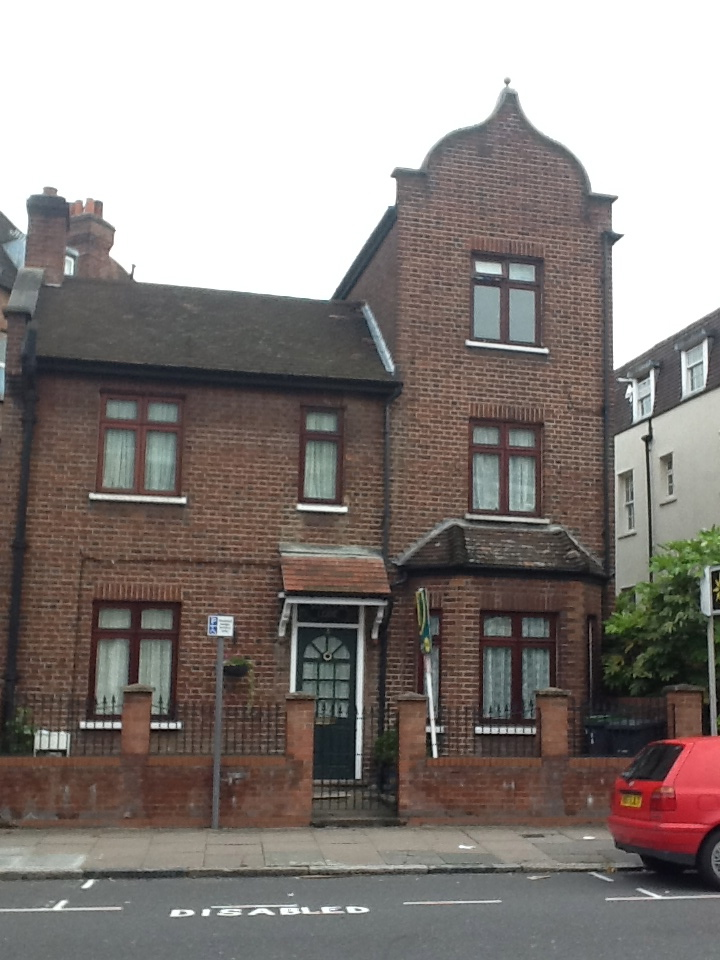
Elevation facing Stapleton Hall Road, 5 June 2012

Proposed elevation facing Mount Pleasant Crescent, c.1895

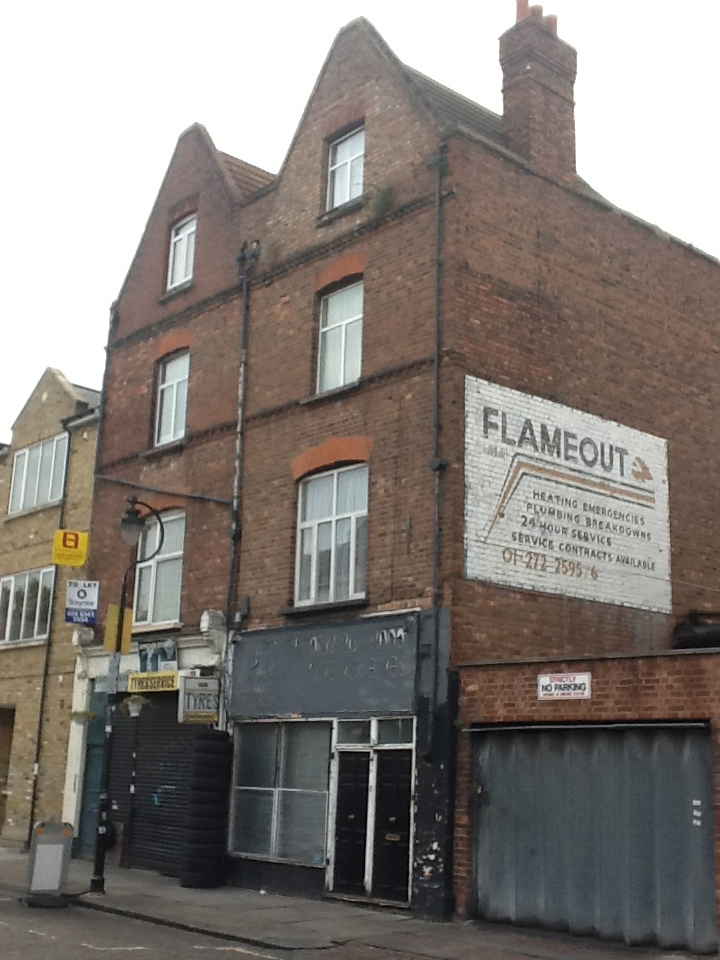
Elevation facing Mount Pleasant Crescent, 5 June 2012

Block plan (detail) of the site for the proposed Assembly Rooms, c.1895

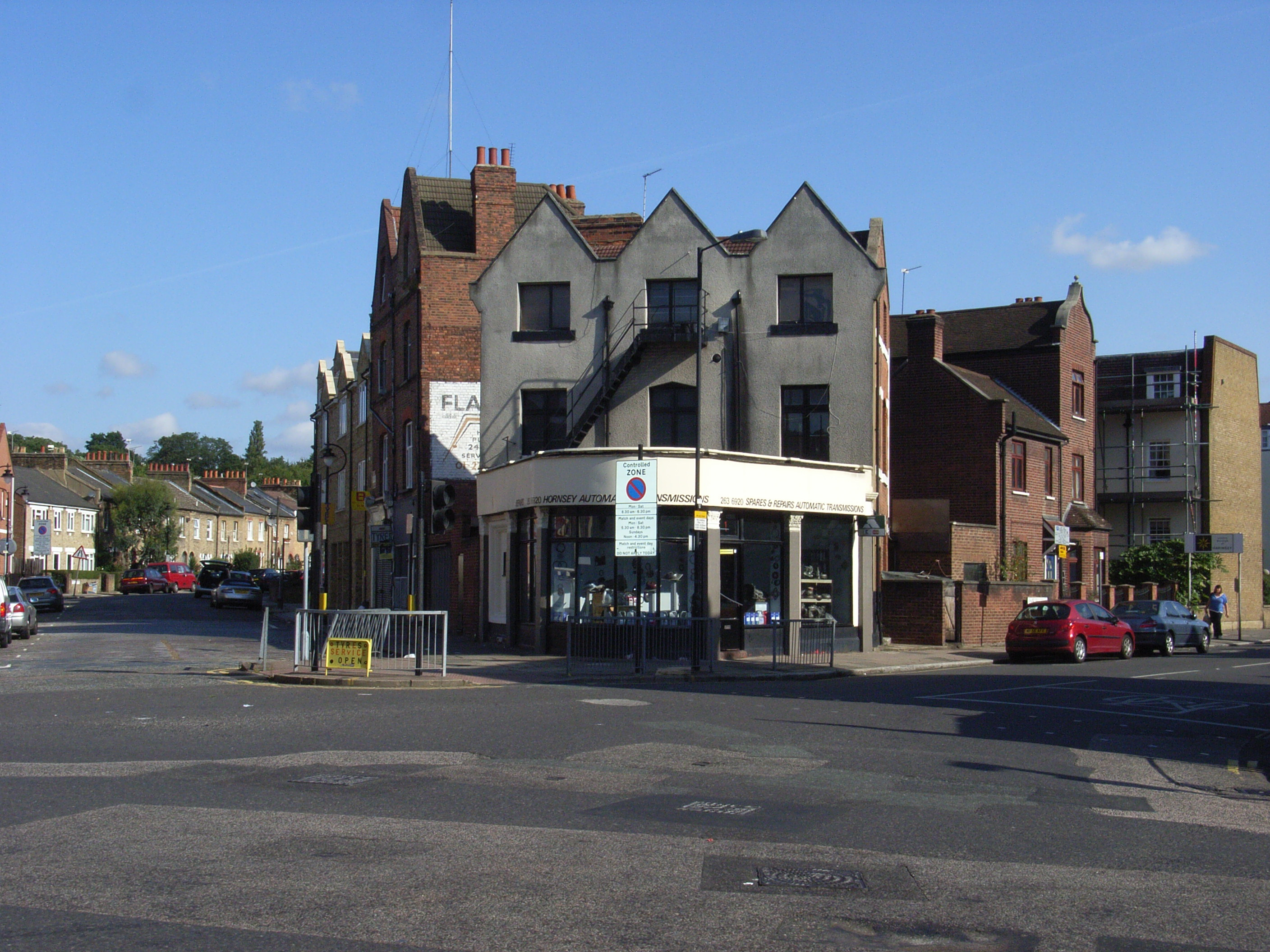
The site in Sep. 2008 showing Mr Tanner's property & incomplete brick Assembly Rooms behind

=== Stroud Green House ===
Sometimes referred to as Prouse House, Stroud Green House (a large, detached villa) once occupied the area approximately bordered by Stroud Green Road, Stapleton hall Road, Victoria Road and Albert Road. Prouse Terrace - nos-2-14 Stapleton Hall Road - records its presence. This house was once the home of William Prowse (1801–1886) who, in the 1830s, founded the music business and ticket agency Keith, Prowse and Co, with Robert Keith (1767–1846).

=== Stroud Green Station ===
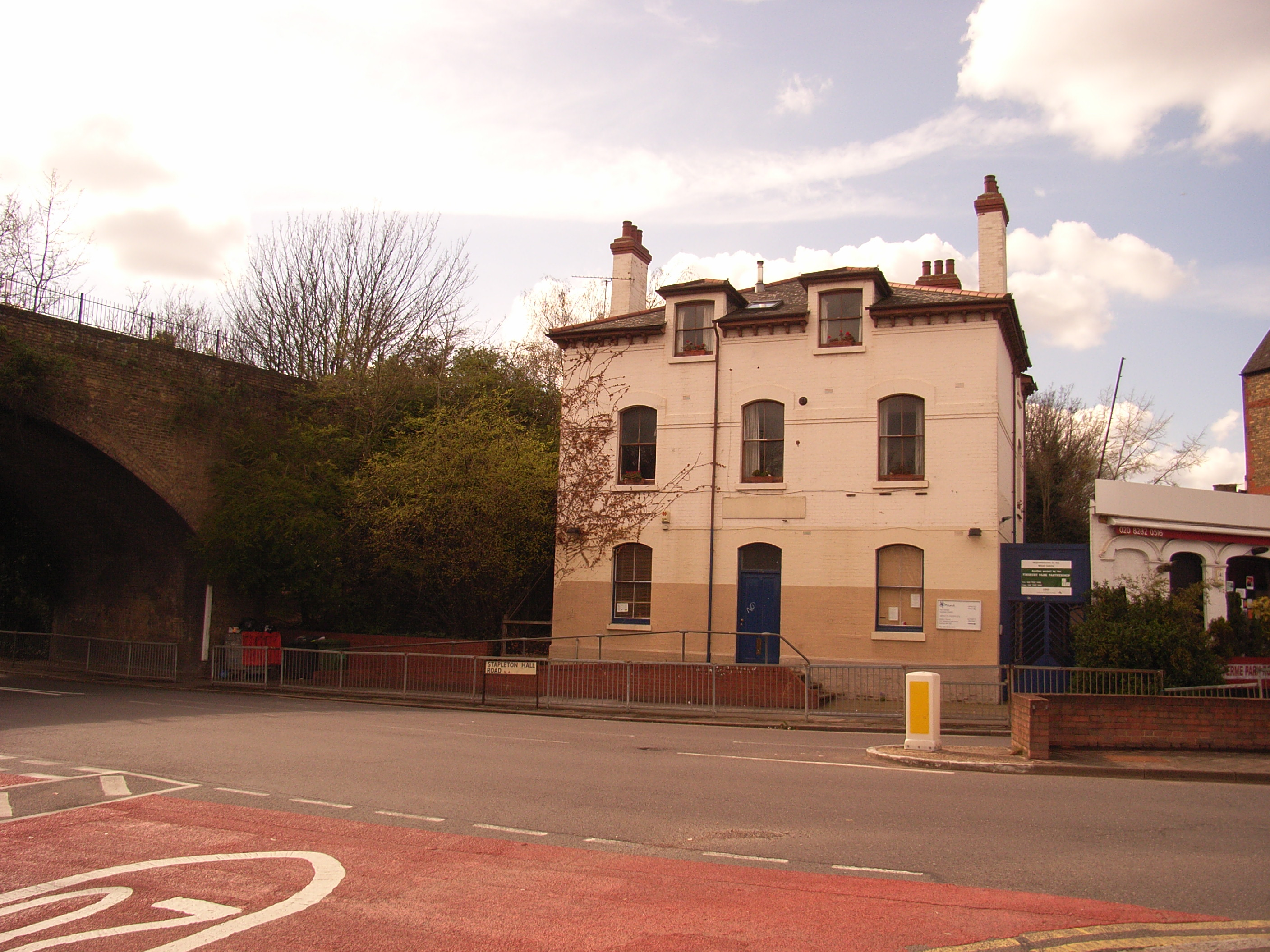
The station house at Stroud Green, at the junction of Stapleton Hall Road and Ferme Park Road, in March 2008

Under the Edgware, Highgate and London Railway Act 1862 (25 & 26 Vict. c. xlvi) the Edgware, Highgate & London Railway Co. (part of the G.N.R. from 1866) opened a line from Finsbury Park through Stroud Green to Edgware, via Highgate, with later branches to Alexandra Palace and High Barnet.

In 1881 the Stroud Green station was opened in Stapleton Hall Road.

A local branch line linking Highgate and Alexandra Palace was opened in 1873, but was then closed the same year after the destruction of the palace by fire. It re-opened in 1875 with a new station at Muswell Hill, but continued to be closed for varying periods on several occasions up to 1952.

In 1954 the whole of the line from Finsbury Park to Highgate and beyond was closed to passenger traffic; freight services continued to Muswell Hill until 1956 and to Highgate and Finchley until 1964, the track to the Alexandra Palace being taken up in 1958 and to Highgate in 1970. The track between the station at Finsbury Park and Highgate is now a pedestrian, public right of way called the Parkland Walk.

=== Womersley House ===
Womersley House, as it was at the start of the 20th century

While strictly speaking not properly part of Stroud Green, Womersely House, close by the St Peter-in-Chains catholic church, has already been noted as home to the Turner family, prominent local landowners in the late 19th century, who had previously occupied Stapleton Hall. By the early 20th century however it was a hostel for single working women. It occupied a plot of land bordered by Elm Grove and Womersley Road, and had been demolished by 1947 as can be seen on various RAF aerial survey photos on the Historic England website. The site is currently (March 2008) being re-developed.

== Demography ==
In the 2001 census, compared to the rest of the Borough of Haringey, Stroud Green had ...

- ... a higher proportion of resident 25- to 44-year-olds.
- ... a higher than average number of single households.
- ... a higher proportion of residents holding degree-level qualifications (also higher than the London average).
- ... a higher proportion of white-British residents.
- ... a higher proportion of people declaring no religion, or refusing to state a religious belief.
- ... a higher proportion of social-class A, B and C1 (also higher than the London average), in predominantly professional and managerial occupations.
- ... fewer households in public housing.
- ... fewer benefit claimants.
- ... lower overall levels of crime.
- ... better levels of health.
