= 7/7 Ripple Effect =

2007 film by John Hill

- Directed by: John Hill
- Release date: 5 November 2007
- Country: United Kingdom
- Language: English

7/7 Ripple Effect is a 57-minute homemade conspiracy theory film about 7 July 2005 London bombings, produced and narrated by John Hill. The film disputes the official account of events, a terrorist attack on public transport in Central London, by four suicide bombers later named as Hasib Hussain, Germaine Lindsay, Shehzad Tanweer and Mohammad Sidique Khan. Hill released the film under the pseudonym "Muad'Dib", the name of a character from the Dune books.

== Content ==
The film questions events surrounding the attacks and presents alternative theories for who was behind them. The film makes unfounded accusations against the Metropolitan Police and Tony Blair, claiming that the true perpetrators of the attacks were MI5 and/or Mossad, who supposedly tricked the four men into travelling to London with rucksacks, in order to provide CCTV footage later to be used as evidence in the investigation of the attacks. It alleges that the four bombers were actually murdered in Canary Wharf, and did not die as suicide bombers in the explosions on the three London Underground tube trains and one bus where the attacks took place. This thesis was taken up in the book on the London Bombings Terror on the Tube.

== Critical reception ==
An episode of the BBC programme The Conspiracy Files titled "7/7", which first aired on 20 June 2009, addressed part of the claims made in the film as well as other theories surrounding the attacks. The programme also revealed Muad'Dib to be John Hill from Sheffield, tracking him down to an address in Kells in the Republic of Ireland.

== Release ==
The film was first released on the Internet on 5 November 2007, two years after the attacks. Physical copies were also sent to many of the people connected with the attacks. The film was shown on 9 September 2009 at the 9/11 Film Festival at the Grand Lake Theater in Oakland, California. On 7 July 2012 and 7 July 2019 updated and expanded versions were released.

== Legal action ==
Hill was arrested and extradited to the United Kingdom on a charge of perverting the course of justice for sending DVDs of the film to the judge and jury foreman in a trial linked to the attacks. He was acquitted on 12 May 2011.
