= Samantha Lewthwaite =

British terrorist (born 1983)

- Photo of Samantha Lewthwaite from her Interpol Red Notice profile
- Born: Samantha Louise Lewthwaite; 5 December 1983 (age 42); Banbridge, County Down, Northern Ireland
- Other names: Asmantara; Sherafiyah; Sherafiyah Lewthwaite; White Widow; Natalie Webb; Asmaa Shahidah Bint-Andrews
- Education: School of Oriental and African Studies, University of London (no degree)
- Organization: Al-Shabaab
- Known for: Terrorism
- Spouse: Germaine Lindsay (m. 2002; died 2005)
- Children: 4

Samantha Louise Lewthwaite (/ˈluːθweɪt/; born 5 December 1983), also known as Sherafiyah Lewthwaite or the White Widow, is a British terrorist and suspected mass murderer who, in the early 2010s, was one of the Western world's most wanted terrorism suspects. Lewthwaite, the widow of 7/7 London terrorist bomber Germaine Lindsay, is accused of causing the deaths of more than 400 people. By 2022, Lewthwaite had not been heard of for many years.

Lewthwaite is alleged to be a member of the Somalia-based radical Islamic militant group Al-Shabaab. She is accused of orchestrating grenade attacks at non-Muslim places of worship, and is believed to have been behind an attack on those watching football in a bar in Mombasa during Euro 2012. In September 2013, there was speculation over her possible involvement in the Nairobi Westgate shopping mall attack, although other reports cast doubt on this, or said her role had been exaggerated. She was dubbed the "White Widow" by the news media, a play on words referencing her race and the death of her first husband, and the practice of referring to Chechen female suicide bombers as "Black Widows".

== Early life ==
Lewthwaite was born to parents Andrew and Elizabeth Christine (née Allen) Lewthwaite in Banbridge, County Down in 1983. Her father is a former British Army soldier who served in the 9th/12th Royal Lancers and had met her mother while he was stationed in Northern Ireland in the 1970s. Following her birth, the family lived for a short period in Northern Ireland, where her father worked as a lorry driver, before settling in Aylesbury, Buckinghamshire, where she attended The Elmhurst School and The Grange School. She started a Bachelors degree in Politics and Religion at the School of Oriental and African Studies, University of London, but dropped out.

=== Conversion to Islam ===
Lewthwaite's parents separated in 1994, and friends later reported that she was badly affected by the break-up and sought solace from Muslim neighbours who she believed had a stronger family network. Born as a Christian, by the age of 17 she had converted to Islam. She adopted the name Sherafiyah at the time of her conversion.

She met Germaine Lindsay on the Internet and arranged to meet him at a Stop the War march in Hyde Park, London; they married in Aylesbury on 30 October 2002, using the Islamic names Asmantara and Jamal. Lewthwaite's parents, who "never came to terms with their daughter's conversion", refused to attend the ceremony.

=== 7/7 bomb attacks ===
Three years later, at 8:50 a.m. on 7 July 2005, Lindsay blew himself up on a train travelling between King's Cross and Russell Square tube stations. He killed 26 civilians in his suicide attack. Lewthwaite was eight months pregnant with their second child, a daughter, at the time of his death, and their first child, a son, was 14 months old. Lewthwaite reported her husband missing six days after the bombing by telephoning a helpline set up for families of the victims. She denied prior knowledge of the attacks and said:

I totally condemn and am horrified by the atrocities. I am the wife of Germaine Lindsay, and never predicted or imagined that he was involved in such horrific activities. He was a loving husband and father. I am trying to come to terms with the recent events. My whole world has fallen apart, and my thoughts are with the families of the victims of this incomprehensible devastation.

She was placed in protective custody in a police 'safe house' after an attempt to set fire to her home in the immediate aftermath of the bombings. At the inquest into the bombings, it was disclosed that Lewthwaite had associated with Mohammad Sidique Khan, the ringleader of the London bombers, before the attacks.

=== The Sun article ===
In September 2005, Lewthwaite was widely criticised for selling her story, in which she portrayed herself as a victim and her husband as a "relatively recent [convert]" who had been "tricked into his actions by extremists", to tabloid newspaper The Sun for £30,000. The Independent reported that Lewthwaite's account conflicted with evidence from Lindsay's sister that he had actually converted to Islam aged 15, and said that families of the victims were "unconvinced by her portrait of the bomber", while her "attempts to share the blame with others obscured the murder of innocent commuters". The Yorkshire Post said: "For very good and obvious reasons, there is a law against any criminal profiting from his illegal activities by selling his story to a newspaper. And while the letter of the law has not been broken on this occasion—Ms Lewthwaite is not a criminal—its spirit has clearly been breached."

=== Post-7/7 ===
The Daily Telegraph reported in September 2013 that Lewthwaite was subsequently believed to have met and married Habib Saleh Ghani, who was born in Hounslow, London in 1985. Ghani, also known as Abu Usama al-Pakistani, first moved to Kenya in 2007, where his mother was born. His father immigrated to Britain from Pakistan. Ghani was a contemporary of Asif Mohammed Hanif at Hounslow Jamia Masjid and Islamic Centre. Hanif killed himself and three others at "Mike's Place", a bar in Tel Aviv, in April 2003, after possibly being recruited by Hamas in Damascus, Syria. Lewthwaite gave birth to a third child in 2009, but the father was not named on the birth certificate. She is reported to have moved to the north of England, then later to have disappeared with her children, and was believed to be in hiding in Tanzania or Somalia.

A later Telegraph report casts doubt on the marriage to Ghani. Quoting anti-terrorist police in Kenya, the newspaper said in October 2013 that there was "no romantic relationship between the two", but that they were linked through their "associates in the same cell in Mombasa, that was intending to set off bombs in December 2011". In May 2014, the Daily Mirror reported that Lewthwaite had married Hassan Maalim Ibrahim, a senior commander with the Al-Shabaab militant group.

== Alleged links to Al-Shabaab ==
=== Use of fraudulent passport ===
In February 2012, anti-terrorist police in Nairobi, Kenya, issued an arrest warrant for a white woman using the false name of Natalie Faye Webb. The white woman was known to have used a fraudulently obtained South African passport. After liaising with Scotland Yard, they said that the woman was known to be using at least three separate identities that included her true identity, Samantha Lewthwaite, and was accompanied by three children. The woman was wanted in connection with links to an Al-Shabaab terrorist cell planning attacks in Kenya in reprisal for anti-terrorism operations being conducted in Somalia. The photograph of the woman in the passport bore "a strong likeness to Samantha Lewthwaite”.

The police said, "We believe she is not a small fish. She is among several Britons that our intelligence service is aware of in relation to terrorists' plans to attack us." The woman had entered Kenya in November 2011 using the passport and then joined other members of the cell in Mombasa. The real Natalie Webb was discovered to be an English nurse living in the home counties who had been the victim of identity theft. A "large team" of detectives from SO15, the Metropolitan Police Service's Counter Terrorism Command, travelled to Nairobi to assist with the investigation and attempts were launched to locate Lewthwaite in Britain.

The police initially said that they could not confirm that the woman was definitely Lewthwaite "unless and until she is captured" and said, "Samantha Lewthwaite is one of the names in our records. She had three children with her. She was connected to the terror group." Lewthwaite's father said, "I cannot believe she would be involved in something like this and be there with the children. We have not had any contact with her for some time, I haven't spoken to her for a long time. I don't know if she's in this country or where she is. She has a lot of friends up north but she does not have much to do with us. I don't even know the name of her latest child."

Alfred Mutua, the Kenyan Government Spokesperson and Public Communications Secretary, said, "We believe she is a collaborator with terrorists. Our understanding is she was working with people here, al-Qaeda or al-Shabaab people. She is a very big sympathiser with those people. She was not going to carry out an attack, but she helped to fundraise, helped in the acquisition of weapons, hiding people, transporting people, that kind of thing."

Examination of the recovered passport showed that the woman first entered Kenya from Tanzania on 26 February 2011, re-entered on 25 August 2011, and again on 21 November 2011. She was placed under surveillance by Kenyan police after moving into an apartment in Mombasa belonging to the former wife of terrorist financier Musa Hussein Abdi. Abdi had been killed along with Fazul Abdullah Mohammed, the leader of Al-Qaeda in East Africa, by Somali Armed Forces near Mogadishu, Somalia, in June 2011, and was believed to have been a key player in the funding of Al-Shabaab.

=== Links to Johannesburg ===
Following renewed publicity about Lewthwaite's activities in 2013, Naledi Pandor, the South African Minister of Home Affairs, issued a statement saying that the passport had been "fraudulently acquired" using birth registration documents in the name of Natalie Faye Webb, and had been issued by the passport agency in Durban. Pandor said that they had determined that Lewthwaite first entered South Africa in July 2008 and "travelled in and out of the country on several occasions". The passport had been cancelled and added to a "stop list" in 2011.

Further investigations revealed that Lewthwaite, using the Natalie Webb identity, had worked as an IT specialist at a halal meat factory in Lenasia, Johannesburg, and had lived in rented properties in the Mayfair and Bromhof suburbs of Johannesburg. Credit records showed that Lewthwaite ran up a number of unpaid debts from bank loans, credit cards and clothing store charge accounts in South Africa, including R28,000 owed to First Rand Bank and R30,000 to Standard Bank.

Lewthwaite gave birth to her fourth child, a daughter, at a private birthing centre in Johannesburg in July 2010. The Daily Telegraph reported that she registered with the clinic late into her pregnancy, and under the name Asmaa Shahidah Bint-Andrews. She gave birth after attending four prenatal appointments. Anti-terrorism investigators told the newspaper the child's father is believed to be Abdi Wahid, a former Kenyan naval officer who defected to al-Shabaab.

=== Arrest of Jermaine Grant ===
In December 2011, Kenyan police raided a property in Mombasa and arrested Jermaine Grant, also known as Ali Mohammed Ibrahim, a 29-year-old British Muslim convert of Jamaican origin from Newham, London. Grant, who was using a forged Canadian passport in the name of Peter Joseph, was charged with possession of bomb-making materials and preparing to commit a felony. In January 2012, police raided the apartment where the woman known as Natalie Webb was staying but she had already fled. The terror cell was believed to be planning attacks targeting hotels and tourists in Mombasa during Christmas 2011. When questioned by police Grant identified the woman as the leader of the cell and confirmed that she was Samantha Lewthwaite.

Kenyan police revealed Grant was already known to them after being arrested in the Dadaab refugee camp in northern Kenya in 2008 while attempting to travel to Somalia disguised as a woman wearing a burqa. He and two other men, also wearing burqas, were allegedly travelling to meet an Al-Qaeda leader. Six hours after their arrest, a group of 20 Al-Shabaab fighters freed all three men after storming the Dadajbula police post where they were being held. One of the other two men is believed to have been Saleh Ali Saleh Nabhan, later killed by US Navy SEALs in Operation Celestial Balance, an attack against an Al-Qaeda training camp in Somalia in 2009. A woman who was with the group at the time of their arrest but not detained was subsequently identified by Kenyan police as Lewthwaite.

=== Confirmation of identity ===
In March 2012, it was disclosed that the CIA had joined the search for Lewthwaite along with Habib Saleh Ghani who had fled at the same time. The two were identified from photographs as having rented a property near to the exclusive Mombasa Serena Beach Hotel and Sarova Whitesands Beach Resort, which police suspected they planned to target. Ghani was using a forged Mozambique passport in the name of Marco Costa and told the landlord that Lewthwaite was his wife. A neighbour said: "We knew her as 'the white woman' who was very secretive. She went to the mosque a lot and would not let her children attend school." When police searched the property they found a laptop computer, magazines for an AK-47 assault rifle, 100 rounds of ammunition, detonators and a photograph of Lewthwaite. Initial reports indicated that the computer had been smashed, and its hard drive removed, but later reports discussing the laptop's content appeared to contradict this.

Police said: "We have no doubt that the woman we are looking for is Samantha Lewthwaite. This is a massive manhunt. We believe she is dangerous and have issued her photograph to all border posts." Fingerprint evidence recovered in Mombasa was sent to Scotland Yard and confirmed to be a match with those of Samantha Lewthwaite. Kenyan police said: "Samantha Lewthwaite's fingerprints have been confirmed by detectives we have been working with from the UK... We are confident we are looking for the White Widow."

The British Foreign and Commonwealth Office warned: "We believe that terrorists may be in the final stages of planning attacks. Attacks could be indiscriminate and target Kenyan institutions as well as places where expatriates and foreign travellers gather, such as hotels, shopping centres and beaches."

Ghani was reportedly killed in al-Baate, southern Somalia, in September 2013 following an internal feud within the organisation. Ghani and American jihadist Abu Mansoor Al-Amriki were shot dead by Al-Shabaab fighters who had been tracking down and killing allies and supporters of Hassan Dahir Aweys, who split from Al-Shabaab in June 2013. Al-Amriki was on the FBI's Most Wanted Terrorists list with a $5 million bounty offered for information leading to his capture. The killings were allegedly ordered by Al-Shabaab's chief, Moktar Ali Zubeyr.

In October 2013, reports emerged concerning the content of a laptop and flash drive used by Lewthwaite, and subsequently recovered from Mombasa by Kenyan police. A Sky News investigation suggested she had used the computer to research information about bomb-making, as well as hair and beauty tips. Among the 2,000 files on the hardware was a downloaded document titled The Mujahideen Explosives Handbook, and Ode to Osama, a poem allegedly written by Lewthwaite which pays tribute to the founder of al-Qaeda, Osama bin Laden.

=== Arrest warrant ===
On 4 January 2012, Kenyan authorities issued an arrest warrant for Lewthwaite to answer charges of possessing bomb-making material and conspiring to make an explosive device with the intent to harm others. The charges were not made public until May 2012, when Jacob Ondari, Kenya's assistant director of public prosecutions, announced: "Samantha Lewthwaite was charged in absentia and a warrant of arrest issued against her."

Kenyan police revealed that when Grant was arrested in December 2011, the group was only days away from committing an attack. The target was either "a hotel in Mombasa or a shopping mall in Nairobi." Grant was also alleged to have voluntarily given up the identity of Lewthwaite, telling police officers: "There is someone much bigger you really want; she is the financier." In March 2012, following a request from the Kenyan authorities, Interpol issued a Red Notice requesting the arrest and extradition of Lewthwaite. In April 2019, Grant was convicted of possession of bomb-making materials, but acquitted of conspiracy to commit a terrorist act.

=== Mombasa grenade attack ===
In July 2012, she was named as one of the suspects involved in a 24 June 2012 grenade attack on the Jericho bar in Mombasa. The attack took place during a Euro 2012 football match between England and Italy. Kenyan police said a woman matching Lewthwaite's description was seen near the bar shortly before the attack in which three people were killed and 25 injured. Police said: "We suspect Samantha Lewthwaite was actively involved in the terrorist attack on the club."

=== Westgate shopping mall attack ===
Lewthwaite's name was linked with the September 2013 attack after Kenyan President Uhuru Kenyatta stated that "a British woman" might be involved in the attack. The attack was claimed by Al-Shabaab on the Westgate shopping mall in Nairobi, which left 71 dead and approximately 200 injured. Despite intense media speculation, these reports were viewed with caution by UK government officials, and there was no confirmation of Lewthwaite's involvement as an attacker, organiser, or fundraiser. Al-Shabaab itself claimed no women played a role in the attack. In a Twitter post the group said, "We have an adequate number of young men who are fully committed and we do not employ our sisters in such military operations."

On 5 October, Kenyan authorities named four people believed to have participated in the attack, all of whom they said were killed in the ensuing standoff with the country's military forces. Police chief David Kimaiyo also confirmed that Lewthwaite was not among those involved in the incident.

=== Alleged presence in Lamu ===
In June 2014, the BBC reported that well-placed security sources indicated that they had reliable information that Lewthwaite was in Kenya, and that they had launched a large operation to find her. According to reports, an unknown woman, who was believed to be Lewthwaite, was escorted by armed Kenyan police officers in the coastal town of Lamu, with the apparent intention of visiting a Kenyan army base in Somalia. The woman then allegedly disappeared after immigration officials denied her entry into the country. However, Lamu Police Commander Leonard Omollo denied the allegations, indicating that the woman in question had been identified as a Spanish tourist who had since returned home.

== Later years ==
By February 2022, her uncle said that he thought she was dead, while two security analysts have said she was most likely being sheltered at a remote location in Somalia or Tanzania.

== In popular culture ==
The character of Susan Helen Danford who serves as an antagonist in the action thriller film Eye in the Sky was said to have been strongly inspired by Lewthwaite with the character being a radicalized white convert to Islam, the wife of a notorious Islamist terrorist and a coordinator of terrorist attacks. The backstory of one of the main antagonists in 24: Live Another Day Margot Al Hazari (who is known in the show as the Yorkshire Widow) was partially based on that of Lewthwaite.

== See also ==
- Foreign fighters in the Syrian and Iraqi Civil Wars
- List of fugitives from justice who disappeared
- Sally-Anne Jones
- Tareena Shakil
- Sarah Panitzke – "the UK's most wanted woman"
- Malika Al-Aroud
- Fatiha Mejjati
