= Stratford Street Mosque =

Mosque in Leeds, West Yorkshire, England

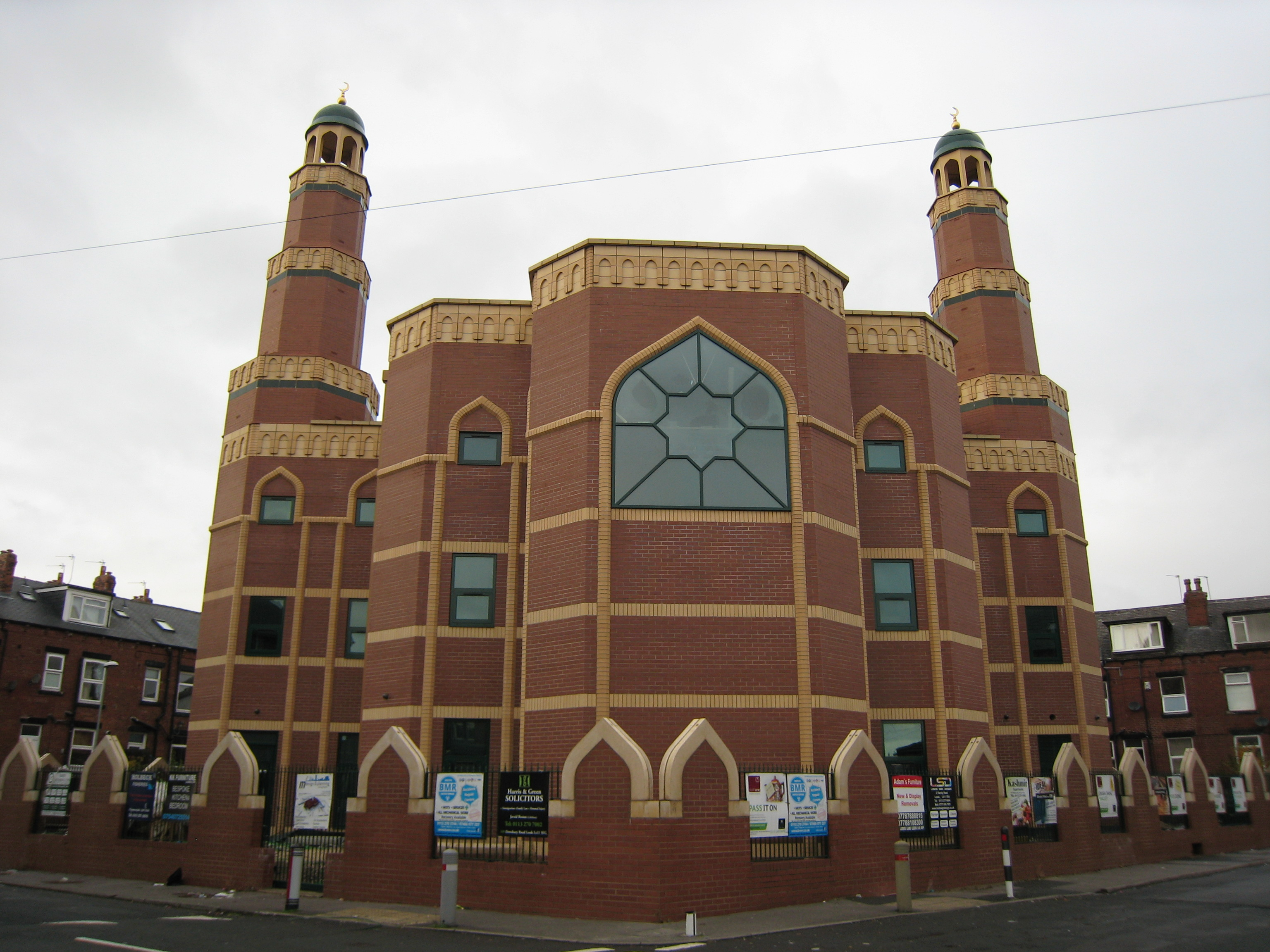

- Location within Leeds

Location
- Location: Leeds, England
- Interactive map of Stratford Street Mosque
- Coordinates: 53.7751°N 1.5475°W

Architecture
- Type: mosque

Stratford Street Mosque (officially the Omar Mosque or Masjid-e-Umar) is a mosque in Beeston, Leeds, England.

Three people responsible for the 7 July 2005 London bombings (Shehzad Tanweer, Mohammad Sidique Khan and Hasib Hussain) were regulars at Friday prayers at the mosque. Stratford Street mosque is just a few streets away from the Colwyn Road home of Tanweer, who caused the Aldgate explosion.

Mumir Shah, the imam of the mosque, condemned the London bombings at Friday prayers a day after the attacks, telling worshippers "that all human beings are brothers because of our grandfather, Adam (reported elsewhere as Abraham)" and that the message of Islam is one of "peace and friendship."

== See also ==
- Islam in the United Kingdom
