= Hamara Youth Access Point =

Youth centre in West Yorkshire

The Hamara Youth Access Point (Hyap) was a drop-in centre for teens in Leeds, West Yorkshire, England, operated by the Hamara Healthy Living Centre, an Islamic charity partly funded by the UK government. The drop-in centre was frequented by several of the suspects in the 7 July 2005 London bombings.

In 2005, police searched the premises and confiscated items such as computer hard drives for forensic investigation Both Shehzad Tanweer, 22, and Hasib Hussain, 19, who have since been proven to be suicide bombers, frequented Hyap, according to police. The Leeds teacher Mohammed Sadique Khan, 30, also identified by police as a suicide bomber, acted as a mentor to youths at the centre.

The Hyap's status permitted it to apply for grants from the UK government.
