= Cockburn John Charles Academy =

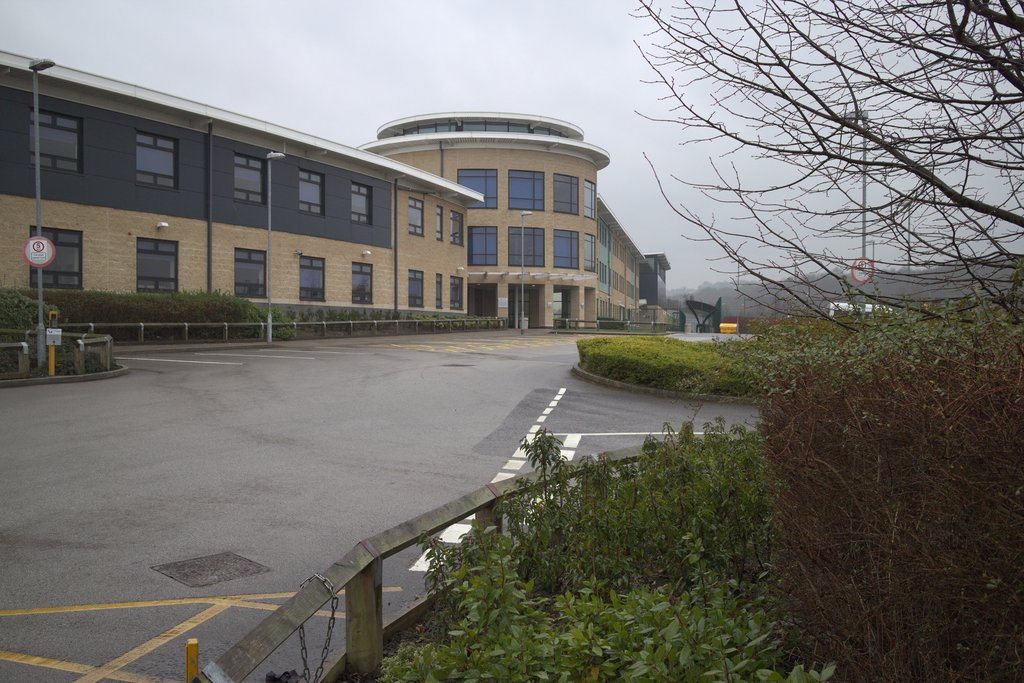

Location
- Old Run Road; Belle Isle; Leeds, West Yorkshire, LS10 2JU; England
- Coordinates: 53.7658°N 1.5377°W

Information
- Type: Academy
- Local authority: Leeds City Council
- Department for Education URN: 145927 Tables
- Ofsted: Reports
- Gender: Mixed
- Age: 11 to 16
- Enrolment: 1,147 as of April 2023
- Website: www.cockburnjohncharles.org

Cockburn John Charles Academy (formerly The South Leeds Academy) is a mixed secondary school located in the Belle Isle area of Leeds, West Yorkshire, England.

It was originally known as Belle Isle Middle School, before becoming a secondary school. It was then renamed Merlyn Rees Community High School. The school was formally merged with Matthew Murray High School in 2006 and was renamed South Leeds High School. The school then relocated to a new site near John Charles Centre for Sport. In 2009 the school converted to academy status and was renamed The South Leeds Academy. After a period of poor results the school gained a new sponsor in 2018 and was renamed Cockburn John Charles Academy.

Cockburn John Charles Academy offers GCSEs and BTECs as programmes of study for pupils. The new academy no longer has a Sixth Form but has strong relationships with local Post 16 providers.

Cockburn John Charles Academy is the 2nd in a franchise of schools owned by the same sponsor and all sharing the Cockburn name.

== Notable former pupils ==
=== As The South Leeds Academy ===
- Hasib Hussain, Islamic terrorist who detonated a bomb on a bus during the 7 July 2005 London bombings
- Mohammad Sidique Khan, Islamic terrorist who led the 7 July 2005 London bombings
