= Abdul Haqq Baker =

British academic

Dr. Abdul Haqq Baker
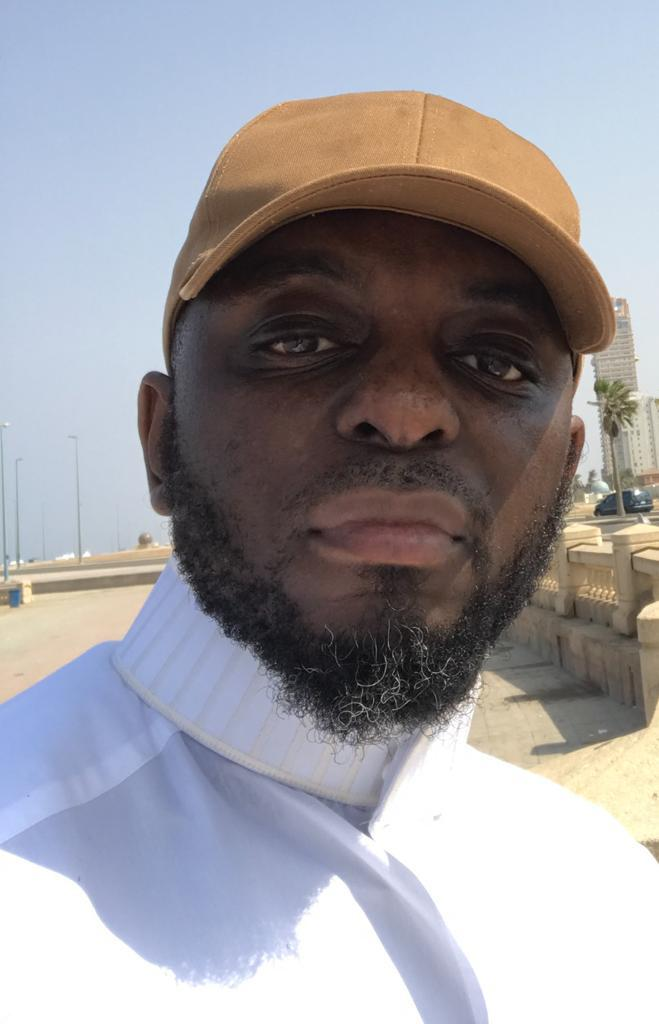
- Born: Anthony Baker; 1966 (age 59–60)
- Education: MBA in Education; PhD in Politics; University of Exeter
- Occupations: Academic and Religious Leader
- Known for: De-radicalizing Muslim Extremists
- Website: abdulhaqqbaker.com

Abdul Haqq Baker (born 1966) is an academic and religious leader. He supports the Salafi branch of Islam that is popular in the Persian Gulf. He is known for his work de-radicalizing young Muslims influenced by extremist groups like al-Qaeda.

== Early life and education ==
Baker was born in 1966. His mother and father are from Guyana and Nigeria respectively. Baker was raised Roman Catholic and attended a Christian school, where he first became interested in religion.

In his youth, Baker got involved in local gangs, until he converted from Christianity to Islam in 1990. Baker's given name was Anthony Baker, but he adopted his current Muslim name after converting. Specifically, Baker joined the Salafi movement, a fundamentalist branch of Sunni Islam. Baker later earned a Master's degree in Business Administration and a PhD in Political Studies from the University of Exeter.

== Career ==
Baker worked as a lawyer for ten years, before becoming the Chairman of The Brixton Mosque and Islamic Cultural Centre in 1994, a position he held for 15 years. While there, he persuaded radical Abdullah el-Faisal and his followers to leave the mosque after an armed standoff. In 2007, Baker created a controversial initiative called Strategy to Reach, Empower and Educate Teenagers (STREET).

Most of STREET's activities were typical of anti-gang youth initiatives, but its de-radicalization program was unusual. It was praised by experts and security professionals for its effectiveness, but criticized by more liberal religious groups and Western countries for supporting the same literal interpretation of the Quran that radicalizes many terrorists. Baker argued it was these very shared religious beliefs STREET had with at-risk Muslim youth that made it approachable.

The British government cut funding of £300,000 per annum to STREET in May 2010 after an election caused a change in political leadership. Baker had resigned as Chairman of Brixton, but remained a trustee, in order to focus on the STREET program.

According to his website, Baker now does research, lectures, and public speaking events on violence among religious extremists. Baker developed the "Convert's Cognitive Development Framework," which describes the stages of a Muslim's conversion to and from violent radicalism. It has four stages: (1) Founding Phase [Conversion] (2) Youthful Phase [Formative] (3) Adult Phase [Foundational] (4) Mature Phase [Reflective]. Baker encourages institutions to move criminals and radicals to the self-reflective stage, whereby the citizen reflects on the world based on their own personal experiences, rather than emotions and propaganda.

== Bibliography ==
- Baker, Abdul (2011). Extremists in our midst : confronting terror. Houndmills, Basingstoke, Hampshire, UK New York: Palgrave Macmillan. OCLC 758435166.
