= Cleanskin (security) =

Type of undercover operative

Within the vernacular of counter-terrorism agents and police officers, a cleanskin is an undercover operative whose identity is not known to the forces they are tasked to infiltrate. This is usually because such an agent has not conducted any prior undercover activity.

The phrase entered wide currency with a slightly different meaning in the United Kingdom following the London bombings of 7 July 2005. The four bombers involved in those bombings were reported in the press to be "cleanskins", according to police sources, meaning that their profiles did not fit the expected profile of bombers.

Terrorist groups, smugglers, and others performing secretive activities prefer to subvert cleanskins as there is less chance that they will arouse suspicion. For example, a person with previous convictions for importing drugs is more likely to be detained than a person never convicted.
