= Hasib Hussain =

British terrorist (1986–2005)

- Hussain leaving a Boots store on the King's Cross station concourse at 9 a.m. on 7 July 2005
- Born: Hasib Mir Hussain; 16 September 1986; Leeds, West Yorkshire, England
- Died: 7 July 2005 (aged 18); Tavistock Square, London, England
- Cause of death: Suicide bombing

Details
- Killed: 13

Hasib Mir Hussain (16 September 1986 – 7 July 2005) was a British terrorist and one of four Islamist suicide bombers who detonated bombs on three trains on the London Underground and one bus in central London during the 7 July 2005 London bombings. At the age of 18, he was the youngest of the group of four.

Hussain detonated a bomb on the No. 30 bus in Tavistock Square. It killed 13 of the 52 people killed in the attacks, excluding him and the three other bombers. Investigators found his body and personal effects on the bus.

== Biography ==
Hussain was born in Leeds General Infirmary, to Pakistani parents and raised in Holbeck, West Yorkshire, Leeds, England, the youngest of four children. He received his primary education at Ingram Road Primary School, Holbeck. In September 1998, he began his secondary education at South Leeds High School. Maintaining a good attendance record, he received GCSEs in English language, English literature, maths, science, Urdu, and design technology and a GNVQ in business studies in 2003. Hussain went on to attend Thomas Danby College in Leeds, earning a Vocational Certificate of Education (AVCE) in business the same year as the attacks. He was a member of the Holbeck Hornets football team and the local cricket team. When he left high school, teachers who knew him described him as "a slow gentle giant".

In the later half of 2003, Hussain met Mohammed Sidique Khan and Shehzad Tanweer. The three frequented the Stratford Street Mosque in Beeston, and were also associated with the Hamara Youth Access Point, a drop-in centre for teens.

== London bombings ==
In mid-June 2005, Magdi Asdi el-Nashar, an Egyptian lecturer at the University of Leeds, rented a flat from Adnan Shukir. Hussain played the role of el-Nashar's purportedly foreign friend. Sources differ, but either Hussain's brother or the police examined Hussain's mobile phone, which had Shukir's number in its storage. Police raided the flat, finding kilogrammes of explosives and other evidence of a bomb-making operation.

Before Hussain went to London with Khan and Tanweer, all three men had travelled to 18 Alexandra Grove, Hyde Park, Leeds, where the homemade explosive devices were assembled. The bombs were placed into a refrigerated box to maintain stability overnight. In the morning they travelled south towards Luton railway station, where they joined Germaine Lindsay, the fourth bomber, at around 6:50 am. They then made the trip to King's Cross station by train.

On the day of the attacks, Hussain may have intended to take the Northern line train: however, it was temporarily suspended on that date and so he left the London Underground system. He was captured on CCTV in a Boots store on the concourse of King's Cross after the other bombs had gone off. Mobile phone records indicate that he had tried to telephone the other bombers. About 50 minutes after the other bombs had detonated, Hussain appears to have boarded the number 30 bus, his bomb exploding shortly thereafter: a driving licence and credit cards were found in the wreckage of the bus in Tavistock Square.

Hussain's parents contacted Scotland Yard at about 10:20 pm on 7 July to report that their son had been travelling to London with three friends and had not been heard from since.

Hussain's body was buried in a Muslim cemetery in Leeds on 2 November 2005.
