= Brixton Mosque =

British mosque located in South London

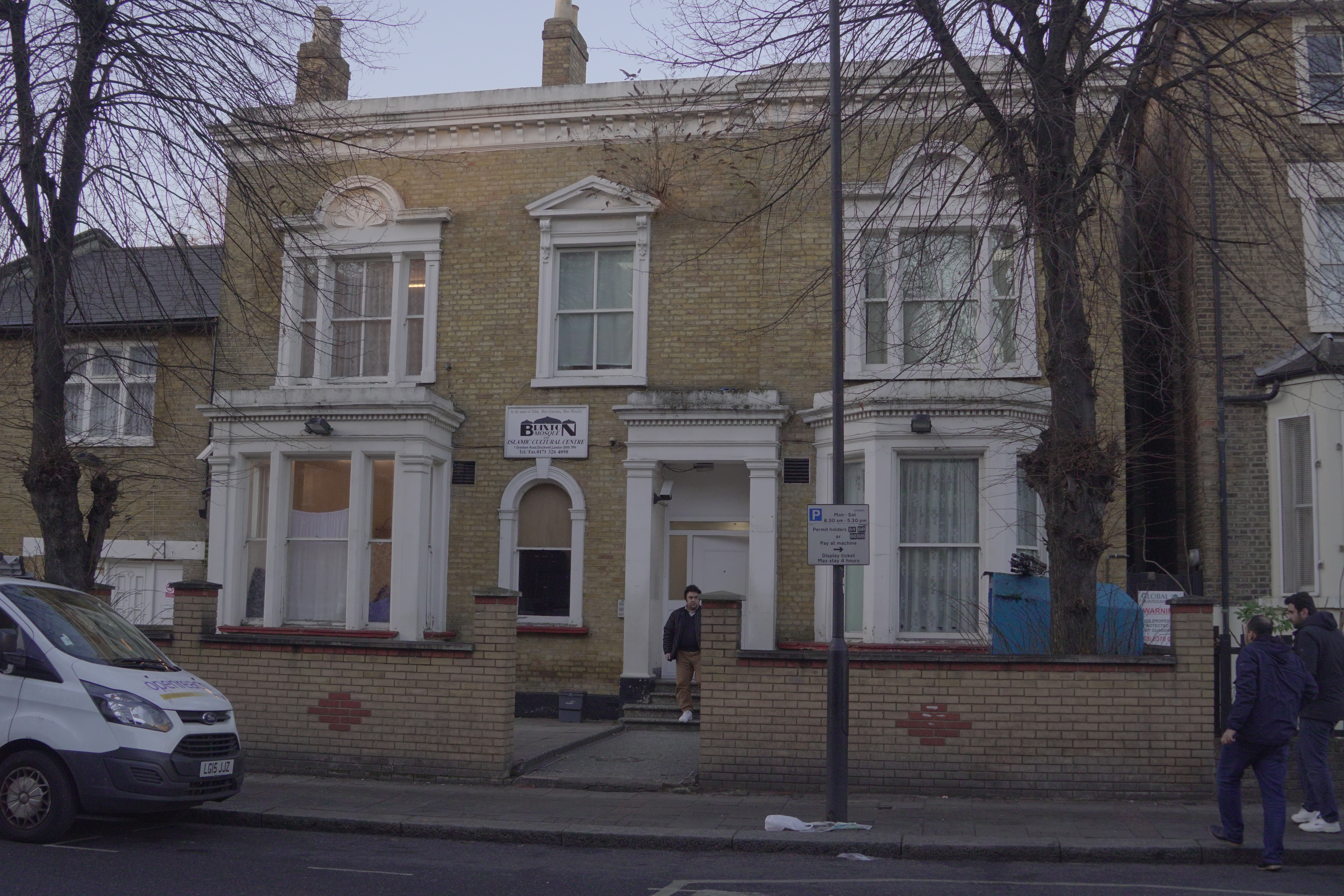

- Location of the mosque in Greater London

Religion
- Affiliation: Sunni Islam
- Sect: Salafi
- Ecclesiastical or organizational status: Mosque
- Status: Active

Location
- Location: 1 Gresham Road, Brixton, South London, England
- Country: United Kingdom
- Interactive map of Brixton Mosque
- Coordinates: 51°27′55″N 0°06′46″W

Architecture
- Type: House
- Completed: 1990

Website
- brixtonmasjid.co.uk

The Brixton Mosque, officially known as The Brixton Mosque and Islamic Cultural Centre, and also known as Masjid ibn Taymeeyah, is a Salafi Sunni mosque, located in Gresham Road in the Brixton area of South London, England, in the United Kingdom. The mosque is managed by Black British converts and is known for its history of controversy.

== Controversies ==
=== Abdullah al-Faisal ===
Abdullah el-Faisal, a radical Takfiri Muslim cleric who preached in the United Kingdom until he was imprisoned for stirring up racial hatred and in 2007 deported to Jamaica, was associated with the Brixton Mosque in the early 1990s, preaching to crowds of up to 500 people. In 1993, el-Faisal was ejected by the mosque's administration who objected to his radical preaching. In 2007, the London Evening Standard published an apology for referring to el-Faisal as the "Brixton Mosque preacher", and clarified that el-Faisal only preached at Brixton Mosque in the early 1990s and not after 1994.

=== Richard Reid ===
The mosque made international headlines when it was reported that Richard Reid, the so-called "shoe bomber", had attended the mosque from 1996 to 1998 after converting to Islam in jail. Abdul Haqq Baker, a former chairman of mosque, told the BBC that Reid came to the mosque to learn about Islam, but fell in with what he called "more extreme elements" in London's Muslim community. "We have been in contact with the police numerous times over the last five years to warn of the threat posed by militant groups operating in our area," said Baker in December 2001 after Reid's arrest. He had warned that terrorist "talent scouts" prey on mosques like the Brixton mosque in search of the young and unstable. Baker warned the congregation, "The recruiting has got out of control. Beware. It's your sons, your teenagers who are plucked into these extreme groups." A Time magazine article in 2002 said: "The Brixton Mosque is an ideal hunting ground for terrorist talent spotters since it attracts mainly young worshipers, including ex-convicts it helps rehabilitate."

=== Zacarias Moussaoui ===
Zacarias Moussaoui, who was convicted of conspiring to kill citizens of the US as part of the September 11, 2001, terrorist attacks, frequented the mosque between 1996 and 1997. Some sources report that it was during this period that he met Richard Reid, though others are less certain. Moussaoui was expelled from the mosque after he began wearing combat fatigues and a backpack to the mosque, and pressured the cleric to provide him with information on how to join the jihad.

== See also ==
- Islam in London
- Islamism in London
- List of mosques in the United Kingdom
