= Mohammad Sidique Khan =

British terrorist (1974–2005)

- Khan's 'martyrdom' video released after his death
- Born: Mohammad Sidique Khan; 20 October 1974; Leeds, West Yorkshire, England
- Died: 7 July 2005 (aged 30); Edgware Road, London, England
- Cause of death: Suicide bombing
- Education: Leeds Metropolitan University
- Spouse: Hasina Patel

Details
- Killed: 6

Mohammad Sidique Khan (20 October 1974 – 7 July 2005) was a British terrorist. He was the oldest and is believed to have been the leader of the four Islamist suicide bombers responsible for the 7 July 2005 London bombings, in which bombs detonated on three London Underground trains and one bus in central London killed 52 people, and injured over 700. Khan bombed the Edgware Road train, killing himself and six other people.

On 1 September 2005, a videotape emerged featuring Khan. The videotape, shown by Al Jazeera Television, also shows Ayman al-Zawahiri, who was later leader of al-Qaeda. The two men do not appear together and the British government says that al-Qaeda was not connected with the bombing. The Home Office believes the tape was edited after the suicide attacks and dismisses it as evidence of al-Qaeda's involvement. In the film, Khan declares: "I and thousands like me have forsaken everything for what we believe" and refers to his expectation that the media would already have painted a picture of him in accordance with government "spin". He goes on to say, "Your democratically elected governments continually perpetrate atrocities against my people all over the world. Your support makes you directly responsible. We are at war and I am a soldier. Now you too will taste the reality of this situation".

== Biography ==
Born at St James's University Hospital in Leeds, Khan grew up in Beeston, where he attended primary school. His parents, originally from Rawalpindi, were amongst the first Pakistanis to settle in West Yorkshire. His father Tika Khan was a foundry worker and his mother is Mamida Begum; both were followers of the Sufi-oriented Barelvi movement, and described as "very liberal". Khan, the youngest of four children, was known by his middle name and nicknamed "Sid". Khan received his secondary education at South Leeds High School, formerly the Matthew Murray High School, which was also attended by Hasib Hussain, another 7 July bus bomber. After completing his secondary education, he attended Leeds Metropolitan University as a business major.

In his late teens, Khan began to show adherence to Wahhabism, a Salafi-oriented movement historically at odds with his family's Barelvi traditions. Khan came into contact with the movement through a local mosque, which differentiated itself from others by offering English-language material, whereas other mosques offered their studies primarily in Urdu, which Khan had little proficiency in. By the mid-1990s, Khan was a leading member of the "Mullah Boys", a group of around twenty Beeston residents with Pakistani origins with ties to the local Wahhabi mosque, which facilitated the forcible rehabilitation and sobriety of drug addicts in response to rising heroin use amongst ethnic Pakistanis. The Mullah Boys broke tradition with older generations of Pakistanis by rejecting consanguine marriage and holding traditional Islamic wedding ceremonies at a nearby Muslim bookshop. The group sometimes ran the bookshop, as well as a gym, at the mosque until a falling out in February 2003.

In 1997, after increasingly adopting Wahhabi ideals and customs, Khan met Hasina Patel, who studied sociology at the same university as him. Patel's family are Indian and followers of the Deobandi movement, parts of which are closely tied to Wahhabism, causing the relationship between Khan and his family to worsen further. In July 1997, he entered a volunteer program as a youth mentor, working in this position for Leeds City Council, as well as an administrator for the Benefits Agency.

In 1999, he came under the influence of radical cleric Abdullah el-Faisal. Khan became interested in the UK-based al-Muhajiroun terror group sometime before 2001. He married Patel in October 2001 moving to Batley, before settling in Dewsbury.

In March 2001, Khan started working at Hillside Primary School in Leeds as a "learning mentor". The school's student body were largely children from unstable homes, those with special needs, or part of immigrant families who had just arrived in Britain. Khan was popular amongst staff, parents, and students, with some children homes describing him as a father figure. Khan's colleagues commented that he was a quiet individual who did not talk about his religious or political beliefs, and that he took the children out to paintballing, quad biking and wall climbing. An anonymous acquaintance told BBC after the bombings that while Khan kept his radical convictions largely concealed, he was considered a "fruitcake" for frequently talking about the state of affairs in Israel, Iraq, and Afghanistan, and complained about "what was happening to Muslims around the world". In one instance, Khan had caused concern by asking to invite an Islamic preacher to the school, which was rejected due to the preacher's "fervour" in meetings with teachers, but no other action was undertaken. One student reported after the bombings that Khan and some of his friends had taken him to their bookshop and tried to convert him to Islam. The boy, aged 11 or 12 at the time, recalled that Khan told him that "people will pay for what has been done to Pakistan" with regards to the then-recent September 11 attacks and the Kashmir conflict. Khan resigned from the school in September 2004.

In summer 2001, Khan planned the recruitment of local youths to attend jihadist training camps abroad. He worked alongside Omar Sharif and Asif Hanif, who would later become known as the first British nationals to commit a suicide bombing, in the 2003 Mike's Place suicide bombing in Tel Aviv. The three men had made four visits to a Manchester-area businessman whom they unsuccessfully asked to help funding flights to in Pakistan, Syria, and Afghanistan, under the guise of educational pilgrimages.

Khan was also involved in the community-run Hamara Healthy Living Centre in Beeston, and worked at its youth outreach project, the Hamara Youth Access Point (HYAP). Staff at the centre have confirmed that two of the London bombers, Shehzad Tanweer and Hasib Hussain, frequented the HYAP. Khan used the outreach project as a recruitment centre, according to a friend of his who spoke to The Guardian. Khan acted as a mentor to the two younger men when they were teenagers before fully recruiting them into the bombing plot.

A few months before his resignation at the Hillside School, Khan started taking unregistered work leaves from his youth counselling position, telling his superiors that he was taking care of his father who had developed depression. Khan had first entered Pakistan in July 2003 and spent some time in Afghanistan taking part in terrorist training camps. Khan, along with Shehzad Tanweer, had also attended a two-week bomb-making in Malakand in Pakistan, near country's border with Afghanistan, between October 2004 and February 2005, allegedly through Mohammed Quayyum Khan, who was later acquitted in the 2004 fertilizer bomb plot.

Mohammad Sidique Khan postponed the event from 6 July 2005 because he had to take his pregnant wife to the hospital. The couple already had a one-year-old daughter by this point.

Khan's mother-in-law, Farida Patel, is also involved in education and works as a council liaison officer at a school in Dewsbury. In 1998, she was the first Asian woman to be invited to a Buckingham Palace garden party, meeting Queen Elizabeth II and other members of the royal family in recognition for her work amongst the Muslim community in Dewsbury, and again in 2004. She was said to have been "devastated" by the actions of her son-in-law.

== London bombings ==
On the morning of 7 July 2005, Khan travelled by car with his three accomplices to Luton in Bedfordshire, from where they caught a train to London King's Cross railway station.

From there, Khan entered the London Underground and boarded a Circle Line train heading west, travelling four stops to Edgware Road. The bomb detonated at 8.50 a.m., just as the train was pulling out of Edgware Road station, killing six victims that were also British including engineer and designer Stan Brewster. Personal documents of Khan's were found on the train.

== Intelligence assessments ==
Khan is alleged to have travelled regularly to Pakistan and Afghanistan to attend military training camps. In 2001, Khan was alleged to have learned bomb-making at the Malakand training camp. He is also alleged to have trained with Indonesian terror group Jemaah Islamiyah and to be directly involved with the 2002 Bali bombing.

According to the Israeli newspaper Maariv, Khan travelled to Israel on 19 February 2003, staying only one night and leaving the next day. Maariv reports that he was suspected of having helped to plan the 30 April 2003 suicide bombing of the Mike's Place bar in Tel Aviv which killed three Israelis, carried out by two British citizens. The Israeli government allegedly played down the report.

According to Ron Suskind's The One Percent Doctrine, the NSA had been monitoring phone calls and emails between Khan and several Islamic radicals from the United States and England, including Ahmed Omar Abu Ali. Just prior to Khan's planned trip to the US, NSA intercepted email exchanges between him and some of his associates discussing a desire to "blow up synagogues on the East Coast". According to Suskind, the CIA wanted to let Khan into the US so that the FBI could put him under surveillance, but the FBI resisted on grounds that, as one FBI case agent stated, "We just can't take the risk ... he goes up and blows up a temple in Washington." US government officials put Khan on a no-fly list to prevent him from entering the country. Suskind was critical of the decision, which the author suggested tipped him off to the fact that he was known to US authorities and might have caused him to be more cautious with his communication to avoid further surveillance.

British intelligence sources and circumstantial evidence suggested that this theory may have resulted from a confusion between two different Mohammed Khans, although it seems that Suskind stood by his claim.

According to David Leppard in The Sunday Times, Khan was assessed by MI5 in 2004, after his name appeared during an investigation into a plan to detonate a 600-lb truck bomb in London. MI5 concluded that Khan's link to the plotters was indirect, and he was not placed under surveillance. MI5 was later criticised for failing to follow up leads relating to Khan. The service responded to the criticisms. Channel 4 News published what it said were excerpts from the transcript of the tape.

US intelligence officials have said that Khan was known to Mohammed Junaid Babar, who has pleaded guilty in the US to providing material support to al-Qaeda. Babar, who told investigators that he worked on a plan to blow up pubs, railway stations, and restaurants in the UK, identified Khan as someone he had met in Pakistan.

On 18 July 2005, the Pakistani government released video footage of Khan arriving at Dubai airport on 19 November 2004 with Shehzad Tanweer, another of the London bombers. Khan and Tanweer stayed in Pakistan until 8 February 2005, then flew back to London together. A third member of the London group, 18-year-old Hasib Hussain, arrived in Karachi on 15 July 2004 from Riyadh, Saudi Arabia, on flight SV714.

== See also ==
- Shehzad Tanweer, Aldgate train
- Hasib Hussain, No. 30 bus
- Germaine Lindsay, Russell Square train
