= Malakand camp =

Alleged al-Qaeda training camp in Pakistan

The Malakand camp is a military training camp in Pakistan that is said to have been run by al Qaeda. Government witness Mohammad Junaid Babar testified at Mohammad Momin Khawaja's trial in Ottawa about Khawaja's account of his attendance at the Malakand camp and The Times of London reported that several United Kingdom citizens alleged to have played key roles in jihadi attacks in the UK were trained at the Malakand camp by key Al Qaeda figures including Abd al-Hadi al-Iraqi.
