= Shehzad Tanweer =

British terrorist (1982–2005)

- Tanweer (right) with fellow terrorists (l-r): Hasib Hussain, Germaine Lindsay, Mohammad Sidique Khan on 7 July 2005
- Born: 15 December 1982; Bradford, West Yorkshire, England
- Died: 7 July 2005 (aged 22); London, England
- Cause of death: Suicide bombing
- Education: Leeds Beckett University

Details
- Killed: 7

Shehzad Tanweer (15 December 1982 – 7 July 2005) was a British terrorist. He was one of four men that detonated explosives in three trains on the London Underground and one bus in central London during the 7 July 2005 London bombings. 52 people were killed, plus the bombers themselves, and over 700 were wounded in the attacks.

Tanweer was named by Scotland Yard as the man who detonated the first bomb while travelling eastbound on the Circle Line between Liverpool Street and Aldgate, killing himself and seven of the 52 victims. The other three men were identified as Mohammad Sidique Khan, Germaine Lindsay and Hasib Hussain, all homegrown terrorists killed in the explosions.

== Biography ==
Tanweer was born in St Luke's maternity hospital, Bradford, to Parveen Akhtar, whose husband, Mohammed Mumtaz Tanweer, was originally from the Faisalabad region of Pakistan. In 1984, the family moved to the Beeston area of Leeds, then to Colwyn Road (also in Beeston) when Tanweer was seven. Known as Kaka (little one) by his family, he attended Wortley High School, where he was described as politically moderate by his friends, who knew him as an outstanding sportsman, excelling at cricket, triple jump, long-distance running, football and ju-jitsu. He then attended Leeds Metropolitan University, where he studied sports science before leaving for Pakistan in 2004 to attend a course in Islamic studies.

At the time of his death, Tanweer is believed to have worked occasionally in his father's fish and chip shop. His father had previously owned a curry takeaway and a butcher's shop.

Tanweer attended several mosques, including Bengali and Stratford Street mosque in Beeston, where two of the other London bombers, Khan and Hussain, are also believed to have worshipped. He also frequented the Hamara Youth Access Point, a drop-in centre for teens, alleged to have been used as a recruitment centre by Khan.

Police have confirmed that Khan and Tanweer went on a two-hour rafting trip together on 4 June 2005 at the National Whitewater Centre in Snowdonia National Park in Wales. Forensic evidence found in rucksacks after the abortive 21 July London attacks linked those attacks to a second group of young men of Asian appearance who booked a rafting trip there on the same day as Tanweer and Khan.

Relatives in Pakistan stated that Tanweer had boasted of wanting to die as a "holy warrior" and that he was enamoured with Osama bin Laden. They noted that incidents such as the 2005 Quran desecration controversy had "always been in his mind". Tanweer's body was buried at the shrine of a local Islamic saint in Tanweer's ancestral village in Samundari, Pakistan on 27 October 2005.

In 2011, evidence emerged that Tanweer had a 'secret girlfriend' with whom he had been intimately involved for a period of three years beginning in 2002, until shortly before his death.

== Trip to Pakistan ==
After completing the hajj earlier in the year, Tanweer travelled to Pakistan for a course in Islamic studies at a madrasa. The Pakistani government released footage of Tanweer arriving at Karachi International Airport with Sidique Khan on Turkish Airlines Flight TK 1056 on 19 November 2004. Tanweer and Khan stayed in Pakistan until 8 February, then flew back to London together.

Intelligence sources say the school, named Jamia Manzoorul Islam, was located in Muridke, Pakistan, 20 miles outside Lahore. It is believed to be connected with Lashkar-e-Tayyaba, a banned militant Islamist group. The madrasa has denied any connection with Tanweer.

== London bombing ==
A few days before the bombing, Tanweer rented a lilac Nissan Micra from a local car-rental agency. Around the same time, he dyed his hair and eyebrows light brown, according to friends; this was due to the strong bleaching effect given off by the bombs' ingredients.

On 7 July, Tanweer, Khan and Hussain are believed to have picked up the bombs from a house in the Burley area of Leeds, hidden them in large rucksacks, then driven to Luton, Bedfordshire in the Nissan, which Tanweer parked in Luton railway station car park.

In Luton, the Leeds group was joined by Lindsay and the men boarded the 07.48 Thameslink train. It arrived at King's Cross Station in London at 08.20, where they went their separate ways and detonated their bombs. London Underground confirmed that the three underground bombs exploded within 60 seconds of each other at 8:50 a.m.

Tanweer travelled eastbound on the Circle line from Kings Cross, detonating his bomb on train number 204 between Liverpool Street and Aldgate stations, also killing at least seven people. He was identified from body parts found in the carriage he blew up.

After the bombings, police found 16 other bombs in Tanweer's car, several of them so-called "initiators" for the rucksack bombs: plastic bottles turned into nail bombs, containing a detonator attached to an electrical cable. Felt-roofing nails were fixed to the outside of the bottles with their tips pointing outwards, apparently intended to cause maximum soft-tissue damage. The devices would then have had cakes of high explosive packed around them.

== Video statement ==
On 6 July 2006, a video statement by Tanweer was broadcast by Al-Jazeera. In the video, which included remarks by al-Qaeda leader Ayman al-Zawahiri, Tanweer said:

"What have you witnessed now is only the beginning of a string of attacks that will continue and become stronger until you pull your forces out of Afghanistan and Iraq. And until you stop your financial and military support to America and Israel". Tanweer argued that the non-Muslims of Britain deserve such attacks because they voted for a government which "continues to oppress our mothers, children, brothers and sisters in Palestine, Afghanistan, Iraq and Chechnya"

Tanweer's statement was, therefore, clearer in making this link with British foreign policy than that of Sidique Khan, the lead bomber. The video has also served to solidify speculation that both Khan and Tanweer had contact with Ayman Al-Zawahiri and other senior figures in the Al-Qaeda organisation while in Dubai.

The video also featured a segment by Adam Yahiye Gadahn.

== Assets ==
Tanweer left behind £121,000, but left no will. A spokesman for the probate department at the High Court said: "The net amount figure of £121,000 is the realisable figure which is what is left after taxes and debts on the estate have been deducted".

== See also ==
- Mohammad Sidique Khan, Edgware Road underground train
- Hasib Hussain, No. 30 Transport for London omnibus
- Germaine Lindsay, Piccadilly Line underground train
- 21 July 2005 London bombings
