= Abdullah el-Faisal =

Jamaican Muslim cleric (born 1963)

- Born: Trevor William Forrest; 10 September 1963 (age 63); Saint James Parish, Jamaica
- Other names: Abdullah al-Faisal, Sheikh Faisal, Sheik Faisal
- Occupation: Cleric
- Spouses: Two currently; one of whom is Zubeida Khan
- Children: 3
- Parent(s): Merlyn Forrest (mother); Lorenzo Forrest (father)
- Status: First release (25 May 2007); deported Incarcerated (March 2023-Present);
- Convictions: 24 February 2003 26 January 2023
- Criminal charges: Under the Offences against the Person Act 1861 with soliciting the murder of Jews, Americans, Christians, and Hindus, and using threatening words to stir up racial hatred in English- and Arabic-language tapes of speeches to his followers
- Penalty: Nine years in prison Incarcerated; 18 years in prison (March 2023)

Abdullah el-Faisal (born Trevor William Forrest, also known as Abdullah al-Faisal, Sheikh Faisal, Sheik Faisal, and Imam Al-Jamaikee, born 10 September 1963) is a Jamaican Muslim cleric who preached in the United Kingdom until he was convicted of stirring up racial hatred and urging his followers to murder Jews, Hindus, Christians, Americans and other "unbelievers".

El-Faisal was sentenced to nine years in prison, of which he served four years before being deported to Jamaica in 2007. He subsequently traveled to Africa, but was deported from Botswana in 2009 and from Kenya back to Jamaica in January 2010.

In 2020, El-Faisal was extradited to the US after being arrested in Jamaica in 2017. He was subsequently convicted in January 2023 in New York State Supreme Court in Manhattan on counts including soliciting or providing support for an act of terrorism. He was sentenced to 18 years in prison.

== Early life ==
El-Faisal was born in Saint James Parish to an evangelical Christian family which belonged to the Salvation Army church, a Christian denomination. He grew up in the small farming village of Point, about 14 miles (23 km) from the city of Montego Bay, in upper St. James, Jamaica. He attended Springfield All-Age, then Maldon Primary and Junior High. At age 16, he converted to Islam, after being introduced to the religion by a teacher at Maldon High School.

He began using the name Abdullah el-Faisal shortly after graduating Maldon in 1980, and changed it legally in 1983. In 1981, in Trinidad, he took a six-week course in Islamic and Arabic studies sponsored by the Saudi Arabian government. He left Jamaica in 1983 for Guyana where he studied Arabic and Islam for a year. Starting in 1984, El-Faisal studied Islam for seven years on a Saudi government scholarship at the Imam Muhammad ibn Saud Islamic University in Riyadh, Saudi Arabia. He then moved to the UK later in the 1980s.

== England: 1991–2003 ==
El-Faisal was sent to the United Kingdom to preach by Sheikh Raji. He returned to the UK in 1991, became the imam at the Brixton Mosque in South London, began preaching to crowds of up to 500 people at the mosque and at Brixton Town Hall. He married his second wife, Pakistani-British biology graduate Zubeida Khan whom he met months after his arrival, in 1992, thereby acquiring rights of residence. This meant he had two wives, as his first marriage was still extant. In 1993, el-Faisal was ejected by Brixton Mosque's administration who objected to his radical preaching.

Afterward, he gave a lecture he called The Devil's Deception of the Saudi Salafis, where he attacked the Brixton Mosque management on the basis of their alleged subservience to the corrupt rulers of Saudi Arabia. He opened a study centre in Tower Hamlets, East London.

Referred to as "Sheikh" by his followers, el-Faisal travelled and lectured to audiences in mosques in Birmingham, London, and Dewsbury in West Yorkshire, and in Manchester, Worthing, Bournemouth, Cardiff, Swansea, Coventry, Maidenhead, Tipton, Beeston, and venues in Scotland and Wales. Some of his lectures were taped and sold at Islamic bookshops. He also called on Muslim mothers to raise their children to be jihad soldiers by the age of 15. The content of those taped lectures served as the basis for his later trial and conviction.

In February 2002, El-Faisal's tapes were purchased by an undercover police officer at an Islamic bookshop at 62 Brick Lane in London and seized under a search warrant at Zam Zam Bookshop at 388 Green Street in East Ham and at his home at 104 Albert Square in Stratford. He was arrested on 18 February 2002.

El-Faisal is an associate of Abu Hamza al-Masri, the Egyptian ousted from the Finsbury Park mosque who is known for preaching against non-Muslims, and who is currently incarcerated in the United States for various offenses. El-Faisal is reportedly a former supporter of Osama bin Laden, and has been linked to al-Qaeda members.

== Conviction and imprisonment: 2003–07 ==
Conviction

After a four-week trial at the Old Bailey, el-Faisal was found guilty by a jury of six men and six women on 24 February 2003 of: (a) three charges of soliciting the murder of Jews, Americans, Hindus, and Christians; and (b) two charges of using threatening words to stir up racial hatred, in tapes of speeches to his followers. He was the first Muslim cleric to be tried in the UK.

Taped lectures

In tapes of lectures he had given, he exhorted Muslim women to buy toy guns for their children, to train them for jihad. El-Faisal tried to recruit British schoolboys for Jihad training camps, promising them "seventy-two virgins in paradise" if they died fighting a holy war. El-Faisal said "Those who want to go to Jannah [paradise], it's easy, just kill a Kaffar [unbeliever] ... by killing that Kaffar you have purchased your ticket to paradise." He suggested killing non-Muslims like "cockroaches."

On one tape, titled "Jihad", he said: "Our methodology is the bullet, not the ballot." In a tape called "Rules of Jihad", thought to have been made before the 9/11 attacks, he said: "You have to learn how to shoot. You have to learn how to fly planes, drive tanks, and you have to learn how to load your guns and to use missiles. You are only allowed to use nuclear weapons in that country which is 100% unbelievers." He encouraged the use of "anything, even chemical weapons," to "exterminate non-believers." A picture of the burning World Trade Center was on the cover of one recording.

He lectured: "You can go to India, and if you see a Hindu walking down the road you are allowed to kill him and take his money, is that clear, because there is no peace treaty between us." He also suggested that power plants could use the dead bodies of Hindus as fuel. "Jews," el-Faisal said, "should be killed ... as by Hitler." He said: "People with British passports, if you fly into Israel, it is easy. Fly into Israel and do whatever you can. If you die, you are up in paradise. How do you fight a Jew? You kill a Jew. In the case of Hindus, by bombing their businesses."

During the trial, he denied he had intended to incite people to violence. He also testified that he had held Osama bin Laden in "great respect," but that bin Laden had "lost the path" since 11 September.

Sentencing and appeal

El-Faisal was sentenced on 7 March 2003 to nine years in prison. He received seven years for soliciting murder, 12 months to run concurrently for using threatening words with intent to stir up racial hatred, and a further two years (to run consecutively) for distributing threatening recordings with intent to stir up racial hatred. Old Bailey judge Peter Beaumont delivered the sentence. He said el-Faisal had "fanned the flames of hostility", and told him: "As the jury found, you not only preached hate, but the words you uttered in those meetings were recorded to reach a wider audience. You urged those who listened and watched to kill those who did not share your faith." The judge suggested that el-Faisal serve at least half his sentence, and then be deported.

On 17 February 2004, el-Faisal lost an appeal of his conviction. While in prison, he attempted to improve conditions, saying: "if you're a cleric, you have to set an example for other Muslim prisoners to follow, and you're not supposed to crack under pressure." He ended up serving four years.

=== Followers: 9/11 plotter, Richard Reid, 7/7 and Flight 253 bombers ===
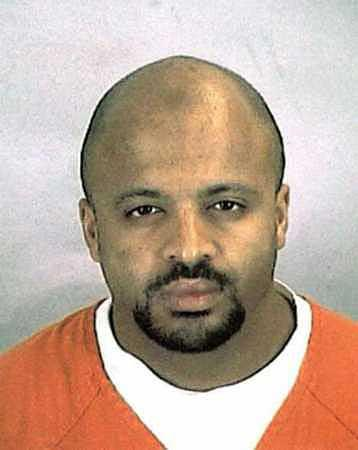
Zacarias Moussaoui

Prosecutors said he preached to 2001 shoe bomber Richard Reid and 9/11 plotter Zacarias Moussaoui.

In addition, two of the four accused 2005 7/7 suicide bombers, Muhammad Sidique Khan, responsible for the Edgware Road blast that killed 6 people, and Jamaican-born Briton Germaine Lindsay, responsible for the blast that killed 26 people at King's Cross tube station, were followers of El-Faisal. In an interview with the BBC in June 2008, he admitted knowing Germaine Lindsay but insisted he had not radicalized him.

In a May 2005 online posting under the name "farouk1986," Umar Farouk Abdulmutallab, the suspected Christmas Day 2009 Flight 253 bomber, referred to El-Faisal, writing: "i thought once they are arrested, no one hears about them for life and the keys to their prison wards are thrown away. That's what I heard sheikh faisal of UK say (he has also been arrested i heard)."

== Deportations from the UK, Botswana and Kenya: May 2007–present ==
Upon being eligible for parole, el-Faisal was released from prison, deported to Jamaica, and permanently banned from the UK on 25 May 2007. He remained on an international watch list. Andrew Dismore, a Labour Member of Parliament, noted that deportation might not adequately address the risks posed by el-Faisal, saying: "Once he's deported to Jamaica, what restrictions will there be to prevent him spreading his message of hate over the Internet?" He was said to preach extremists views online at paltalk chat rooms and associated with the authentic tawheed website.

On his arrival in Jamaica, the Islamic Council of Jamaica refused him permission to preach in its mosques. He began to again give lectures, conduct Q & A sessions via online chats, and established himself at the pulpit of a mosque in Spanish Town, just west of Kingston, Jamaica. The content of his sermons remained the same as that submitted at his trial.

In June 2008, he was preaching in South Africa. He reportedly traveled by road through various countries in Africa including Nigeria, Angola, Malawi, Swaziland, Mozambique, Botswana and Tanzania before entering Kenya.

Along the way, Botswana had deported him as a prohibited immigrant.

=== Kenya ===
El-Faisal was allowed entry to Kenya on 24 December 2009, due to a computer error. He was arrested by anti-terror police in Mombasa on New Year's Eve 2009. Attempts by Kenya to deport him were initially unsuccessful because of his involvement in terrorist activities. He was unable to reach Jamaica, which had said it would accept him, because South Africa, the UK, the US, and Tanzania all declined to issue him transit visas that would allow him to connect to flights to Jamaica.

He was deported from Kenya on 7 January 2010 to the West African nation of Gambia, which agreed to accept el-Faisal at his request. But as he was being transported through Nigeria, Nigerian authorities refused to grant him a transit visa and instead sent him back to Kenya on 10 January 2010. The Gambian government also indicated it would not grant him entry.

Several hundred people demonstrated on 8 January 2010, protesting the "unfair" treatment of el-Faisal. On 15 January, police in Nairobi were summoned to block a protest march by several hundred people, some of whom were waving the flag of al Shabaab. Some angry residents threw stones at the marchers. The following day at least five people died in demonstrations after Friday prayers at Jami'a Mosque.

=== Jamaica ===
El-Faisal was deported from Kenya on a private plane (at a cost in excess of $523,000), and on 22 January 2010 arrived back in Jamaica. There, he was questioned by Special Branch investigators who said that he had not broken any laws in Jamaica, but that the police wanted to make sure they knew where and how to find him "because of the international attention he has received." The Islamic Council of Jamaica banned him from preaching at any of its 12 mosques, but he was permitted to worship there. In 2017, he continued releasing public statements in support of the Islamic State.

In his book Ticking Time Bomb: Counter-Terrorism Lessons from the U.S. Government's Failure to Prevent the Fort Hood Attack (2011), former US Senator Joe Lieberman described Australian Muslim preacher Feiz Mohammad, American-Yemeni imam Anwar al-Awlaki, el-Faisal, and Pakistani-American Samir Khan as "virtual spiritual sanctioners" who use the Internet to offer religious justification for terrorism.

== Conviction and imprisonment: 2017–23 ==
On 25 August 2017, he was arrested in Jamaica after US officers caught him trying to recruit jihadis in an undercover sting operation. According to the Manhattan district attorney, he offered to help an undercover officer travel to the Middle East and join ISIL, and was taken into custody in Jamaica to await extradition to the US.

In July 2020, Jamaica's Court of Appeal ruled the extradition to the US could proceed. Faisal was extradited on 13 August 2020. The New York City district attorney assumed prosecution of the case, with five charges of terrorism. According to a Washington Post report, Faisal was held in "lockdown", confined for 24 hours a day.

On 23 March 2023, Faisal was convicted, after a two-month long jury trial, of recruiting, soliciting, and inspiring students and followers to pledge allegiance to, travel to, join and commit acts of terrorism on behalf of the Islamic State, a/k/a “ISIS” or “ISIL.” He was sentenced to 18 years in a New York state prison.

== Book ==
- Natural Instincts: Islamic Psychology, Darul Islam Publishers, 1997. ISBN 0953062104.

== See also ==
- Undercover Mosque
