= Mike's Place suicide bombing =

2003 terrorist attack in Tel Aviv, Israel

- Part of the al-Aqsa Intifada
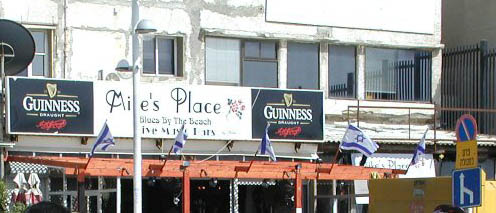
- Mike's Place a few days after the bombing

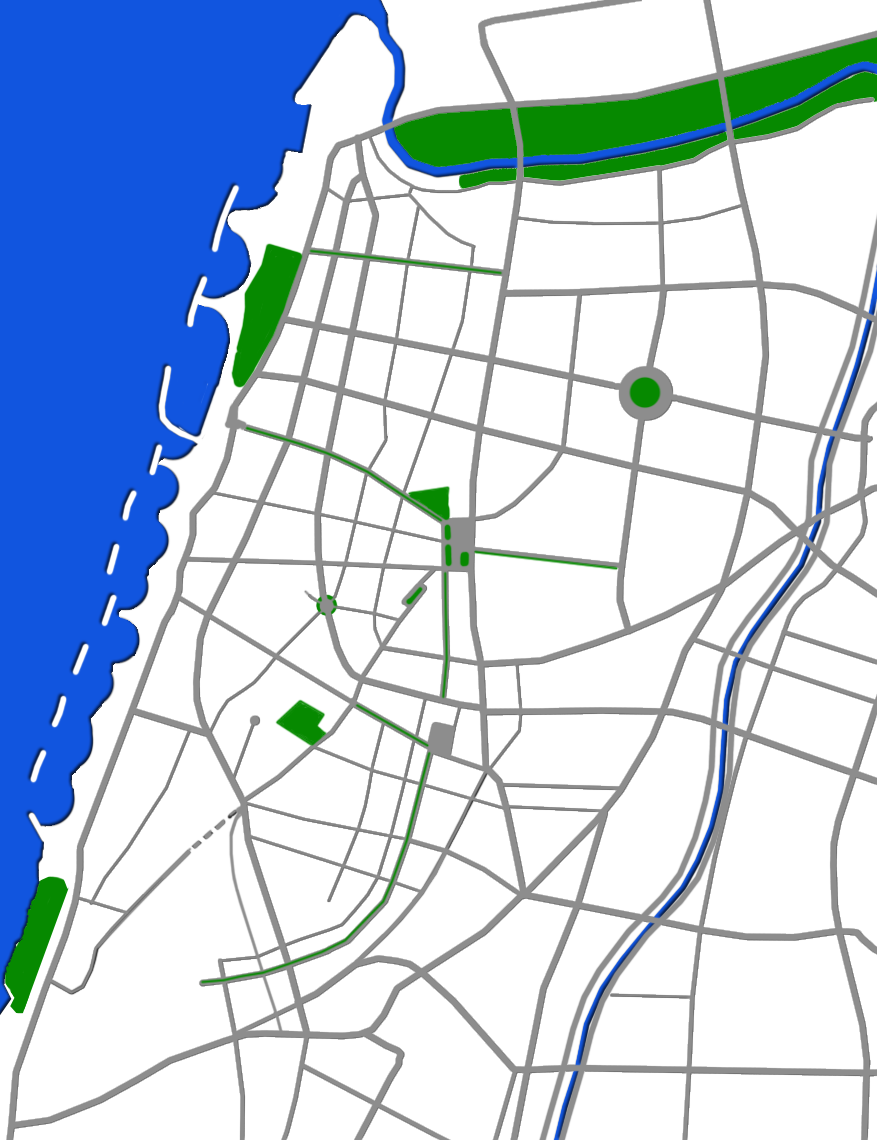
- Location: 32°4′38.22″N 34°46′0.57″E; Tel Aviv, Israel
- Date: 30 April 2003; 12:45 am
- Attack type: Suicide attack
- Weapon: Explosive belt
- Deaths: 3 Israeli civilians (+ 1 bomber)
- Injuries: +50 civilians
- Perpetrators: Hamas and al-Aqsa Martyrs' Brigades claimed joint responsibility

The Mike's Place suicide bombing was a Palestinian suicide bombing, perpetrated by Hamas and Al Aqsa Martyrs Brigades affiliated British nationals, at Mike's Place, a bar in Tel Aviv, Israel, on 30 April 2003, killing three civilians and wounding 50.

== First attack ==
=== Preparations for the attack ===
The two assailants entered Israel from Jordan, via the Allenby Bridge. They reached the scene of the attack from a nearby hotel where they had rented a room. Investigators who later searched their room discovered an elastic belt, explosives and a map of downtown Tel Aviv, on which several crowded venues, including Mike's Place, were clearly marked.

=== Attack ===
At 12:45 am on 30 April 2003, the suicide bomber approached Mike's Place and blew himself up at the entrance. The force of the blast killed three people and injured over 50. One of the wounded was security guard Avi Tabib, who managed to block the suicide bomber, preventing him from entering the bar and causing further fatalities.

=== Perpetrators ===
After the attack, Hamas and the Al Aqsa Martyrs' Brigades claimed joint responsibility for the attack. In addition, a Hamas spokesman identified the perpetrators as British nationals Asif Muhammad Hanif, 22, from London and Omar Khan Sharif, 27, from Derby. Both attackers were associated with the terrorist group Al-Muhajiroun.

== Failed second bombing ==
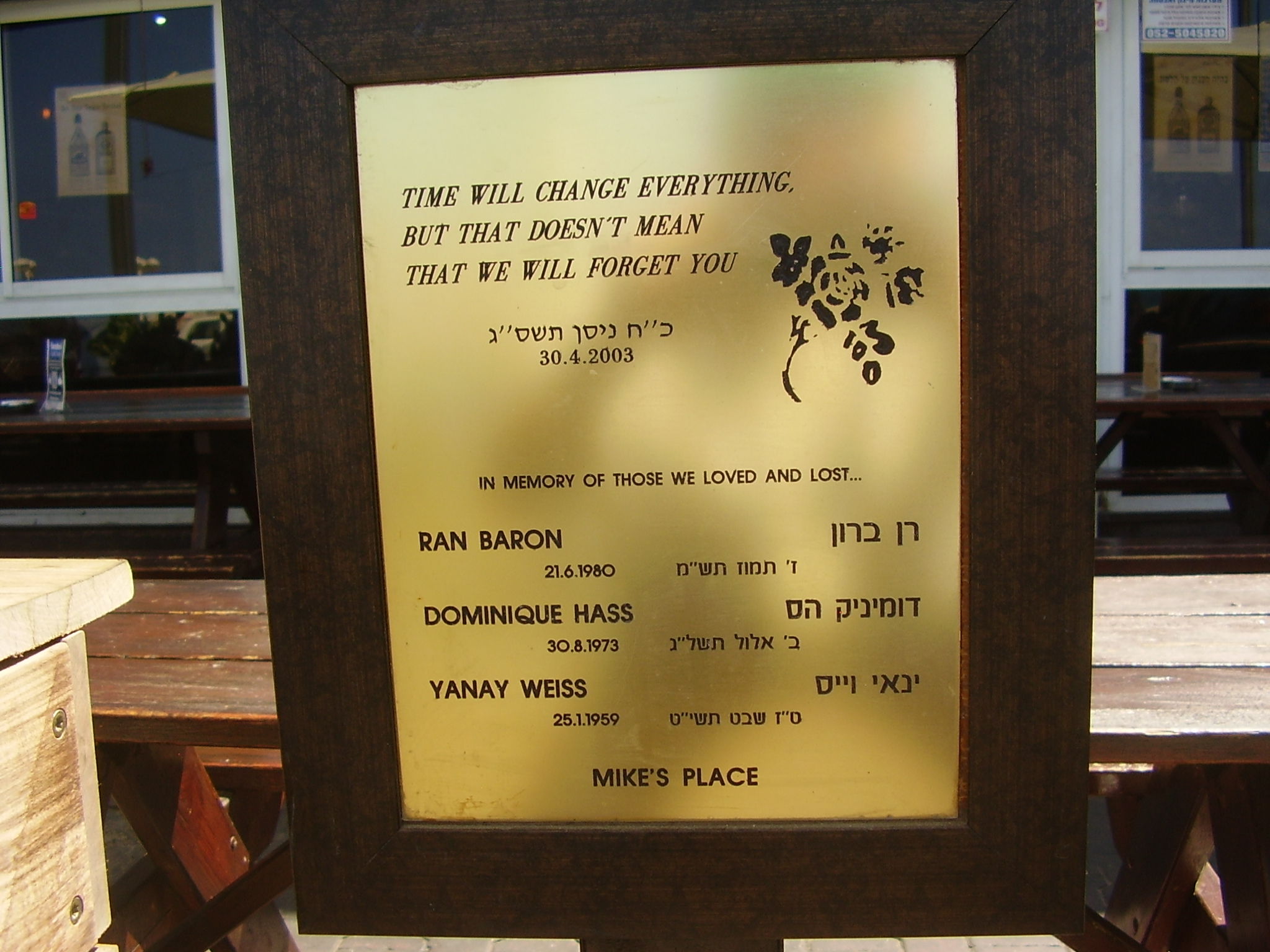
Memorial for victims of the bombing

Immediately after the first attack, Omar Sharif, who was carrying a concealed explosive belt, was supposed to carry out another attack but his explosive device failed to detonate. Sharif, who may have been injured at that point from the explosion, threw away his explosive belt and fled the scene. He reached the David Intercontinental Hotel and struggled with the security guard at the entrance trying to steal his ID, but he did not manage to do so. An examination of the unexploded bomb discarded by Sharif showed that it had been hidden in a book and contained standard explosives.

Sharif's body was washed ashore on the Tel Aviv beachfront on 12 May and was eventually identified on 19 May 2003. Forensic experts said he had drowned.

== Subsequent related events ==
Despite the events of that day, the bar reopened on Yom Haatzmaut, Israeli Independence Day.

=== ISM visit controversy ===
On 25 April, five days before the attack, Hanif and Sharif had visited an International Solidarity Movement (ISM) office, and after chatting for 15 minutes with an ISM volunteer, the men briefly joined a group of 20 people who were commemorating Rachel Corrie's death.

ISM said activists Hanif and Sharif appeared to be "typical Brits." An ISM volunteer reported that the bombers had been among a group of "alternative tourists" who were offered tea when they paid an unscheduled visit to an ISM office on the way to a memorial for Rachel Corrie.

== Cultural references ==
A documentary called Blues by the Beach, about the Tel Aviv Mike's Place, the suicide attack at the bar, and the people affected by it, was directed by American-Israeli filmmaker Joshua Faudem and produced by Jack Baxter, who was seriously injured while making the film.

The Jerusalem branch appears in the film The Holy Land, about a wayward Yeshiva student. The director, Eitan Gorlin, worked as one of the bar's first bartenders in 1994.
