= Germaine Lindsay =

Jamaican-British terrorist (1985–2005)

- Born: Germaine Maurice Lindsay; 23 September 1985; Portmore, Jamaica
- Died: 7 July 2005 (aged 19); Bloomsbury, London, England
- Cause of death: Suicide bombing
- Other name: Abdullah Shaheed Jamal
- Spouse: Samantha Lewthwaite (m. 2002)

Details
- Killed: 26

Germaine Maurice Lindsay (23 September 1985 – 7 July 2005), also known as Abdullah Shaheed Jamal, was a British terrorist who acted as one of the four Islamist suicide bombers who detonated bombs on three trains on the London Underground and a bus in central London during the 7 July 2005 London bombings, killing 52 people plus themselves, and injuring more than 700. Lindsay detonated the bomb that killed himself and 26 other people on a train travelling on the Piccadilly line between King's Cross St Pancras and Russell Square tube stations.

== Biography ==
Lindsay (second from left) alongside Mohammad Sidique Khan and Shehzad Tanweer captured on CCTV at Luton railway station at 7:21 a.m., 7 July.

Lindsay was born in Waterford, a settlement of Portmore, Jamaica, to Miriam McLeod and Nigel Lindsay. The pair lived in Mandeville and broke up shortly after his birth. In 1986, at the age of five months, Lindsay and his mother moved to Britain, living with his mother's new partner, who was reportedly abusive. His mother's second partner was Lindsay's stepfather, with whom he was on good terms, until 2000. Lindsay and his mother made infrequent visits to Lindsay's biological father, with contact ceasing around 1997. Lindsay lived in the Dalton suburb of Huddersfield, West Yorkshire, where he attended Rawthorpe Junior School and Rawthorpe High School.

In 2000, Lindsay converted to Islam at the age of 14 or 15, shortly after his mother converted and encouraged him to do the same. He began attending Islamic studies in Huddersfield and Dewsbury, where he learnt fluent Arabic and memorised most passages of the Quran. In 2001, Lindsay was disciplined at his school for distributing leaflets supportive of al-Qaeda.

In October 2002, Lindsay married a 29-year-old woman from Kinnitty, Ireland, in a traditional Islamic religious ceremony, which had no legal recognition in the UK. Because she objected to Lindsay's wish to take a second wife, he divorced her eight days later to marry Samantha Lewthwaite on 30 October. Lewthwaite, a native of County Down, Northern Ireland, had converted to Islam at the age of 17 after moving to Aylesbury. Lewthwaite lived with him and gave birth to their second child two months after his death.

In 2003, Lindsay's mother moved to the United States by herself. Lindsay dropped out of school and worked part-time as a carpet fitter, supplementing his income by selling covers for mobile phones at a local market.

Abdullah el-Faisal, an imam convicted of attempting to incite sectarian murders in 2003, later claimed to have been close to Lindsay. In late 2004, Lindsay physically assaulted his wife, which did not result in criminal charges.

In June 2005, Lindsay asked a girlfriend in Aylesbury if she could acquire a gun for him, claiming it was to "teach some people a lesson" due to a matter involving drugs. Around the same time, Lindsay's car was tied to a suspected armed robbery in Bedfordshire.

=== Wife ===
Lindsay's wife, Samantha Lewthwaite, denied his involvement until authorities produced forensic evidence to confirm his identity. She later said she abhorred the attacks and that her husband's mind had been poisoned by "radicals".

By 2015, she had been accused of causing the deaths of more than 400 people as the right hand of the al-Shabaab leader Ahmad Umar. Now dubbed the 'White Widow', Lewthwaite is an alleged member of the Somalia-based radical Islamic militant group Al-Shabaab.

== Involvement in London bombings ==
=== Death ===
Lindsay met the other three bombers at Luton and travelled with them by train to London King's Cross Station. Later he detonated his bomb, the third to go off, killing 27 people including himself, on a train travelling between King's Cross St Pancras and Russell Square stations.

== Aftermath ==
Lindsay's mother, who had moved to Grenada, said in a statement at a press conference in St. George's that she condemned the attacks and only learnt of her son's involvement in the bombings through his brother-in-law.

On 22 July 2005, police and fire services were called to Lindsay's home in Aylesbury after neighbours reported a strong smell of petrol coming from it. It was suspected to be a retaliatory arson attack on the empty property. Later it was revealed in the local press that Lindsay's wife and son were living under "police protection" and would not be returning home. In December 2005, two 17-year-olds were convicted at Aylesbury Crown Court of arson in circumstances where they were reckless as to whether the life of another person would be endangered and each sentenced to 18 months youth detention with a training order.

== See also ==
- List of notable converts to Islam
