= 7 July 2005 London bombings =

Islamist suicide terrorist attacks

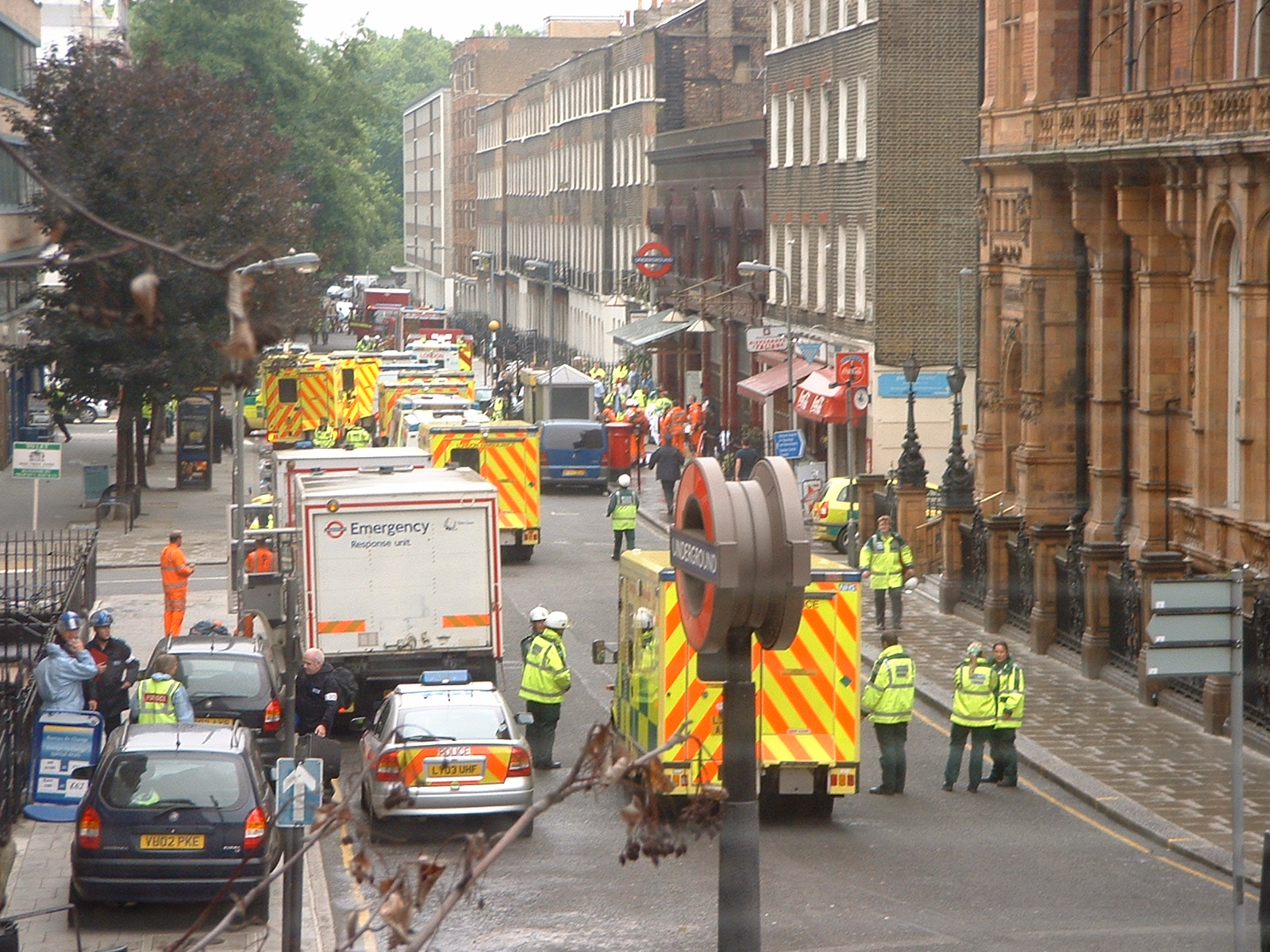
Ambulances at Russell Square after the bombings
1 / Liverpool Street Station; 2 / Edgware Road	3 / King's Cross St Pancras/Russell Square; 4 / Tavistock Square
- Location: London, England: Liverpool Street Station/Aldgate; Edgware Road; King's Cross St Pancras/Russell Square; Tavistock Square
- Date: 7 July 2005; 21 years ago 8:49–9:47 a.m. (UTC+1)
- Target: Civilians aboard London Underground trains and a bus in Central London
- Attack type: Suicide bombings; mass murder
- Weapon: Improvised explosive devices
- Deaths: 56 (including the four bombers)
- Injuries: 784
- Perpetrator: Shehzad Tanweer; Mohammad Sidique Khan; Germaine Lindsay; Hasib Hussain
- Motive: Islamic extremism, revenge for British involvement in the Iraq War

On 7 July 2005, Islamist terrorists carried out four coordinated suicide bombings targeting commuters travelling on London's public transport during the morning rush hour. The attacks are sometimes known as the 7/7 bombings or simply 7/7.

Three terrorists separately detonated three homemade bombs in quick succession aboard London Underground trains in Inner London. Later, a fourth terrorist detonated another bomb on a double-decker bus in Tavistock Square. The train bombings occurred on the Circle Line near Aldgate and at Edgware Road and on the Piccadilly Line near Russell Square.

Apart from the bombers, 52 people from 18 countries were killed and nearly 800 were injured in the attacks. It was the UK's deadliest terrorist incident since the 1988 bombing of Pan Am Flight 103 near Lockerbie and the UK's first Islamist suicide attack.

The explosions were caused by improvised explosive devices made from concentrated hydrogen peroxide and pepper, packed into backpacks. The bombings were followed two weeks later by a series of attempted attacks that failed to cause injury or damage.

== Attacks ==
=== London Underground ===
At 8:49 a.m. on Thursday 7 July 2005, three bombs were detonated on London Underground (LU) trains within 50 seconds of one another:

1. The first bomb exploded on a six-car London Underground Circle Line train, number 204, travelling eastbound between Liverpool Street and Aldgate. At the time of the explosion, the train's third car was approximately 100 yards (90 m) along the tunnel from Liverpool Street. The parallel track of the Hammersmith & City Line between Liverpool Street and Aldgate East was also damaged in the blast.
2. The second bomb exploded in the second car of another six-car London Underground Circle Line train, number 216, which had just left Edgware Road and was travelling westbound towards Paddington. An eastbound Circle Line train that was passing next to the bombed train was also damaged, as was a wall that later collapsed.
3. A third bomb was detonated on a six-car London Underground Piccadilly Line train, number 311, travelling southbound from King's Cross St Pancras tube station to Russell Square. The device exploded approximately one minute after the service departed King's Cross, by which time it had travelled about 500 yards (450 m). The explosion occurred at the rear of the first car of the train, causing severe damage to the rear of that car as well as the front of the second one. The surrounding tunnel also sustained damage.

It was originally thought that there had been six, rather than three, explosions on the Underground network. The bus bombing brought the reported total to seven; this was clarified later in the day. The incorrect reports were later attributed to the fact that the blasts occurred on trains that were between stations, causing wounded passengers to emerge from both stations, giving the impression that there was an incident at each. Police also revised the timings of the tube blasts: initial reports had indicated that they occurred during a period of almost half an hour. This was due to initial confusion by London Underground, who originally believed the explosion to have been caused by power surges. An early report, made in the minutes after the explosions, involved a person under a train, while another described a derailment (both of which did occur, but only as a result of the explosions). A code amber alert was declared by LU at 9:19 a.m., and LU began to close operations by ordering trains to continue to the next station and, to remain at that station and detrain passengers.

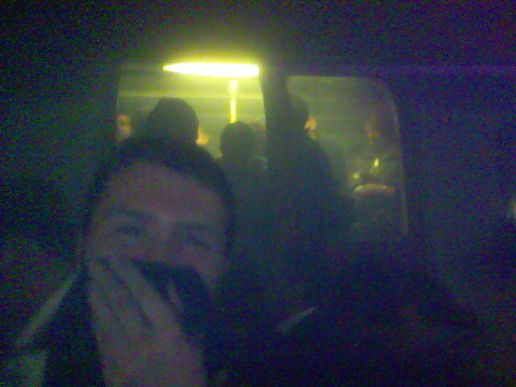
Passengers awaiting evacuation from a bombed train between King's Cross and Russell Square

The effects of the explosions varied due to the differing characteristics of the tunnels in which each occurred:

- The Circle Line is a "cut-and-cover" sub-surface tunnel, about 7 m (23 ft) deep. As the tunnel contains two parallel tracks, it is relatively wide. The two explosions on the Circle line were able to vent their force into the tunnel, reducing their destructive force.
- The Piccadilly Line is a deep-level tunnel, up to 30 m (100 ft) below the surface and with narrow (3.56 m, or 11 ft 8 1/4 in) single-track tubes and 15 cm (6 in) clearances. This confined space reflected the blast force, concentrating its effect.

=== Tavistock Square bus ===
Almost one hour after the attacks on the London Underground, a fourth bomb exploded on the top deck of a number 30 double-decker bus, travelling its route from Marble Arch to Hackney Wick.

The bus left Marble Arch at 9:00 a.m. and arrived at Euston bus station at 9:35 a.m., where crowds of people had been evacuated from the tube and boarded buses as an alternative method of transport.

Locations of the bombings on a Central London tube map

The explosion at 9:47 a.m. in Tavistock Square ripped off the roof and destroyed the rear portion of the bus. The blast took place near BMA House, the headquarters of the British Medical Association, on Upper Woburn Place. A number of doctors and medical staff in or near that building were able to provide immediate emergency assistance.

Witnesses reported seeing "papers and half a bus flying through the air". Two injured bus passengers said that they saw a man exploding in the bus.

The location of the bomb inside the bus meant the front of the vehicle remained mostly intact. Most of the passengers at the front of the top deck survived, as did those near the front of the lower deck, including the driver, but those at the rear of the bus suffered more serious injuries, with several individuals being blown from the bus. The extent of the damage caused to the victims' bodies resulted in a lengthy delay in announcing the death toll from the bombing while the police determined how many bodies were present and whether the bomber was one of them. Several passers-by were also injured by the explosion and surrounding buildings were damaged by debris.

The bombed bus was subsequently covered with tarpaulin and removed for forensic examination at a secure Ministry of Defence site. A replacement bus was named Spirit of London.

== Victims ==
The 52 victims were of diverse backgrounds. All were UK residents, including exchange students. The majority lived in or near London. Their ages ranged from 20 to 60 years old, with an average age of 34.

Thirty-two victims were British born, while one victim each came from Afghanistan, France, Ghana, Grenada, India, Iran, Israel, Italy, Kenya, Mauritius, New Zealand, Nigeria, Romania, Sri Lanka and Turkey. Three victims were Polish nationals, while one victim was a Vietnamese-born Australian and one held dual American-Vietnamese citizenship.

Seven of the victims were killed in the tunnel between Liverpool Street and Aldgate stations, six in the tunnel between Paddington and Edgware Road stations, 26 in the tunnel between King's Cross and Russell Square stations and a further 13 on the bus at Tavistock Square.

== Attackers ==
The bombers captured on CCTV at Luton station at 7:21 a.m. on 7 July 2005 (l-r): Hasib Hussain, Germaine Lindsay, Mohammad Sidique Khan, Shehzad Tanweer

Hasib Hussain, the bus bomber in Tavistock Square, captured on CCTV leaving a Boots store on the King's Cross station concourse at 9:00 a.m. on 7 July 2005

The four suicide bombers were later identified as:

- Shehzad Tanweer, aged 22. He lived in Beeston, Leeds, occasionally working in his parents' fish and chip shop on Lodge Lane. He detonated his bomb first, on the number 204 train. Eight people, including Tanweer, were killed by the explosion.
- Mohammad Sidique Khan, aged 30. The ringleader of the four bombers, he also lived in Beeston, Leeds, with his wife and young child. He worked as a learning mentor at a primary school. Khan was the second to detonate a bomb, on the number 216 train, killing seven people, including himself.
- Germaine Lindsay, aged 19. He lived in Aylesbury, Buckinghamshire, with his pregnant wife Samantha and young son. His was the third bomb to be detonated, on the number 311 train. The blast killed 27 people, including him.
- Hasib Hussain, aged 18. He lived in Leeds with his brother and sister-in-law. Hussain detonated his bomb last, on a bus. Fourteen people, including him, died in the explosion in Tavistock Square.

Three of the bombers were British-born sons of Pakistani immigrants; Lindsay was a convert born in Jamaica.

Charles Clarke, Home Secretary when the attacks occurred, described the bombers as "cleanskins", a term describing them as previously unknown to authorities. On the day of the attacks, all four had travelled to Luton, Bedfordshire, by car. Lindsay arrived at Luton railway station just after 5:00 a.m., while the other three left Leeds around 4:00 a.m. and arrived at the train carpark at approximately 6.50 a.m.; all four entered the station at 7:15 a.m. and boarded a Thameslink train which left for London at 7:25 a.m. (the initial official account wrongly gave this departure time as 7:40 a.m.) They were filmed on CCTV arriving at King's Cross station just before 8:25 a.m. and were seen hugging soon afterwards before heading towards the Tube.

== Motives ==
=== Videotaped statements ===
Two of the bombers made videotapes describing their reasons for becoming what they called "soldiers". In a videotape broadcast by Al Jazeera on 1 September 2005, Mohammad Sidique Khan described his motivation. The tape had been edited and mentioned al-Qaeda members Osama bin Laden, Ayman al-Zawahiri and Abu Musab al-Zarqawi, describing them as "today's heroes". Khan's tape said:

I and thousands like me are forsaking everything for what we believe. Our drive and motivation doesn't come from tangible commodities that this world has to offer. Our religion is Islam, obedience to the one true God and following the footsteps of the final prophet messenger. Your democratically-elected governments continuously perpetuate atrocities against my people all over the world. And your support of them makes you directly responsible, just as I am directly responsible for protecting and avenging my Muslim brothers and sisters. Until we feel security you will be our targets and until you stop the bombing, gassing, imprisonment and torture of my people, we will not stop this fight. We are at war and I am a soldier. Now you too will taste the reality of this situation.

The tape continued:

...I myself, I myself, I make dua (pray) to Allah ... to raise me amongst those whom I love like the prophets, the messengers, the martyrs and today's heroes like our beloved Sheikh Osama bin Laden, Dr Ayman al-Zawahri and Abu Musab al-Zarqawi and all the other brothers and sisters that are fighting in the ... of this cause.

On 6 July 2006, a videotaped statement by Shehzad Tanweer was broadcast by Al-Jazeera. In the video, which may have been edited to include remarks by al-Zawahiri, Tanweer said:

Your government has openly supported the genocide of over 150,000 innocent Muslims in Falluja... You have offered financial and military support to the U.S. and Israel, in the massacre of our children in Palestine. You are directly responsible for the problems in Palestine, Afghanistan, and Iraq to this day. You have openly declared war on Islam, and are the forerunners in the crusade against the Muslims. ... What you have witnessed now is only the beginning of a string of attacks that will continue and become stronger until you pull your forces out of Afghanistan and Iraq. And until you stop your financial and military support to America and Israel.

Tanweer argued that the non-Muslims of Britain deserve such attacks because they voted for a government which "continues to oppress our mothers, children, brothers and sisters in Palestine, Afghanistan, Iraq and Chechnya".

== Effects and response ==
=== Initial reports ===
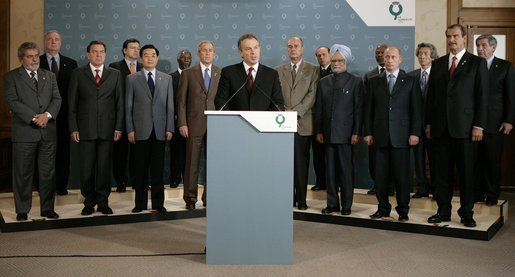
Tony Blair announces the attack at the 31st G8 summit in Scotland.

Initial reports suggested that a power surge on the Underground power grid had caused explosions in power circuits. This was later ruled out by power suppliers National Grid. Commentators suggested that the explanation had been made because of bomb damage to power lines along the tracks; the rapid series of power failures caused by the explosions (or power being ended by means of switches at the locations to permit evacuation) looked similar, from the point of view of a control room operator, to a cascading series of circuit breaker operations that would result from a major power surge. A couple of hours after the bombings, Home Secretary Charles Clarke confirmed the incidents were terrorist attacks.

=== Security alerts ===
Although there were security alerts at many locations throughout the United Kingdom, no terrorist incidents occurred outside central London. Suspicious packages were destroyed in controlled explosions in Edinburgh, Brighton, Coventry, Southampton, Portsmouth, Darlington and Nottingham. Security across the country was increased to the highest alert level.

The Times reported on 17 July 2005 that police sniper units were following as many as a dozen al-Qaeda suspects in Britain. The covert armed teams were ordered to shoot to kill if surveillance suggested that a terror suspect was carrying a bomb and he refused to surrender if challenged. A member of the Metropolitan Police's Specialist Firearms Command said: "These units are trained to deal with any eventuality. Since the London bombs, they have been deployed to look at certain people."

The bombings were followed two weeks later by a series of attempted attacks that failed to cause injury or damage. A day later, police shot and killed a 27-year old Brazilian man Jean Charles de Menezes at Stockwell tube station after he was mis-identified as Hussain Osman, one of the failed suicide bombers.

=== Transport and telecoms disruption ===
Vodafone reported that its mobile telephone network reached capacity at about 10:00 a.m. on the day of the bombings, and it was forced to initiate access overload control (ACCOLC) to prioritise emergency calls. Other mobile phone networks also reported failures. The BBC speculated that the telephone system was shut down by security services to prevent the possibility of mobile phones being used to trigger bombs. Although this option was considered, it became clear later that the intermittent unavailability of both mobile and landline telephone systems was due only to excessive usage. ACCOLC was activated only in a 1 km (0.6 mi) radius around Aldgate Tube Station because key emergency personnel did not have ACCOLC-enabled mobile phones. The communications failures during the emergency sparked discussions to improve London's emergency communications system.

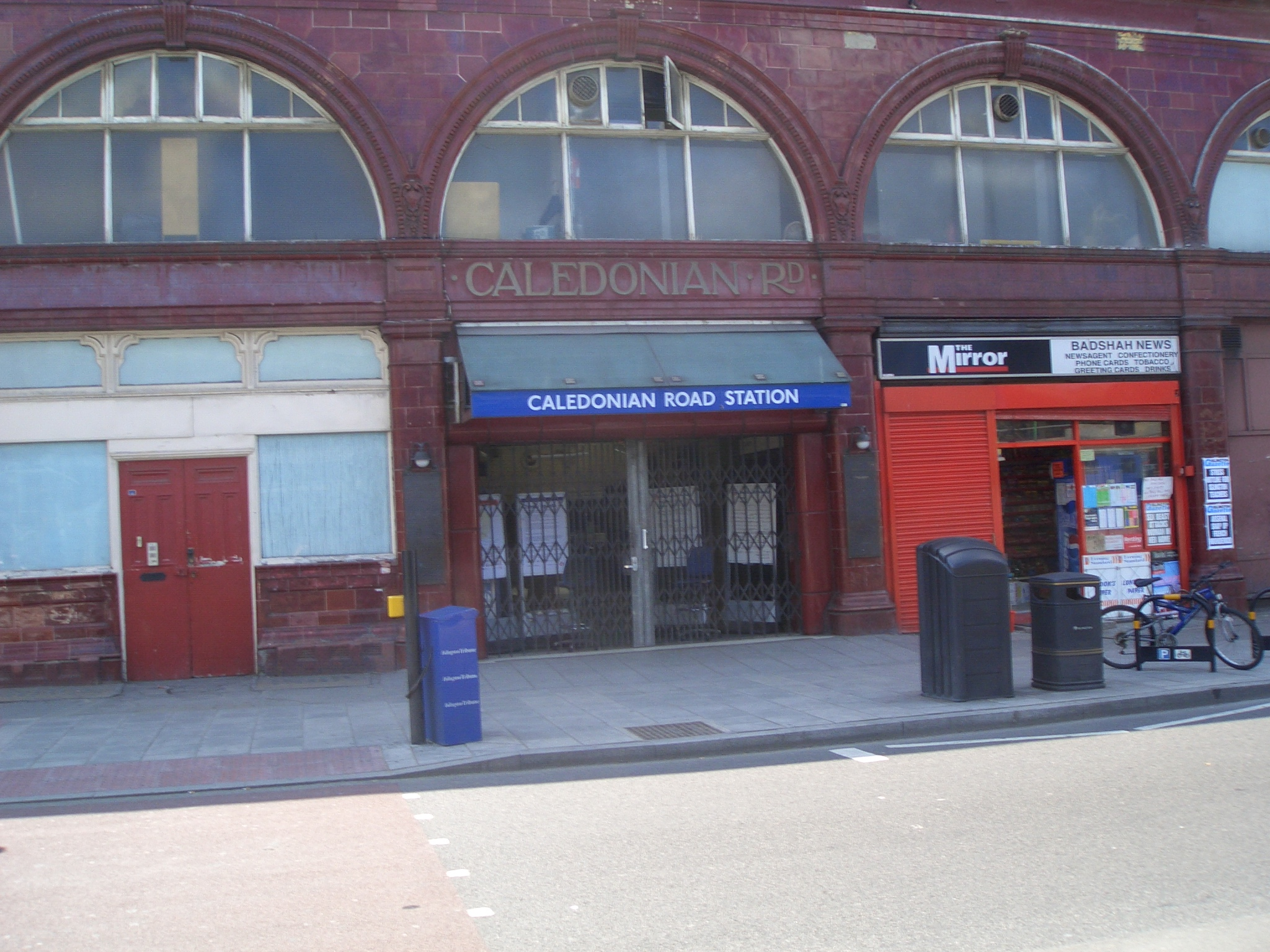
Underground stations, such as Caledonian Road (pictured), were closed across London.

For most of the day, central London's public transport system was largely out of service following the complete closure of the Underground, the closure of the Zone 1 bus network, and the evacuation of incident sites such as Russell Square. Bus services restarted at 4:00 p.m. on 7 July, and most mainline railway stations resumed service soon afterward. River vessels were pressed into service to provide a free alternative to overcrowded trains and buses. Local lifeboats were required to act as safety boats, including the Sheerness lifeboat from the Isle of Sheppey in Kent. Thousands of people chose to walk home or to the nearest Zone 2 bus or railway station. Most of the Underground, apart from the stations affected by the bombs, resumed service the next morning, though some commuters chose to stay at home. Affected stretches were also closed for police investigations.

Much of the King's Cross railway station was also closed, with the ticket hall and waiting area being used as a makeshift hospital to treat casualties. Although the station reopened later during the day, only suburban rail services were able to use it, with Great North Eastern Railway trains terminating at Peterborough (the service was fully restored on 9 July). King's Cross St Pancras tube station remained available only to Metropolitan line services to facilitate the ongoing recovery and investigation for a week, though Victoria line services were restored on 15 July and the Northern line on 18 July. All of the damaged trains were removed in stages. St Pancras station, located next to King's Cross, was shut on the afternoon of the attacks, with all Midland Mainline trains terminating at Leicester, causing disruption to services to Sheffield, Nottingham and Derby.

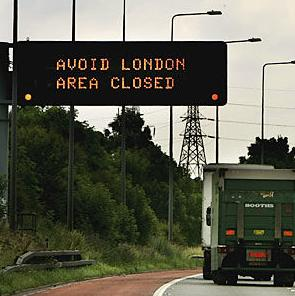
Sign on M6 motorway warns drivers to avoid London.

On 25 July, the Hammersmith & City line was reopened from Baker Street to Barking after the affected train was cleared at Aldgate, together with the stretch from Moorgate to Aldgate of the Metropolitan Line. The Hammersmith to Paddington part of the Hammersmith & City line was a shuttle service after the bombings. On 29 July, the District line was reopened from High Street Kensington to Edgware Road, after the affected train was cleared.

On 2 August, the Hammersmith & City line resumed normal service; the Circle line was still suspended, though all Circle line stations are also served by other lines. The Piccadilly line service resumed on 4 August after the affected train was cleared on 16 July, and enhanced maintenance work was done. On 4 August, the Circle line was reopened.

=== List of emergency responses ===
The list below is of the emergency services, police forces and voluntary aid societies that responded to the bombings to assist with rescue, recovery, security and scene control:

Emergency medical services and voluntary aid societies

- London Ambulance Service (LAS) – response included Motorcycle Response Units (MRUs) and Cycle Response Units (CRU), off-duty personnel also responded.
- London Air Ambulance – sent crews in rapid response vehicles (RRVs), including paramedics and doctors.
- St John Ambulance England (SJA) sent ambulances and medics
- British Red Cross (BRC) sent ambulances and medics to the scene at the request of LAS. They also helped in the aftermath.

Fire and rescue services

- London Fire Brigade (LFB)

Police forces

- Metropolitan Police
- British Transport Police – responded to the tube station attacks, as well as Tavistock Square and conducted mortuary, security, rescue and body recovery duties
- City of London Police

=== Economic effect ===
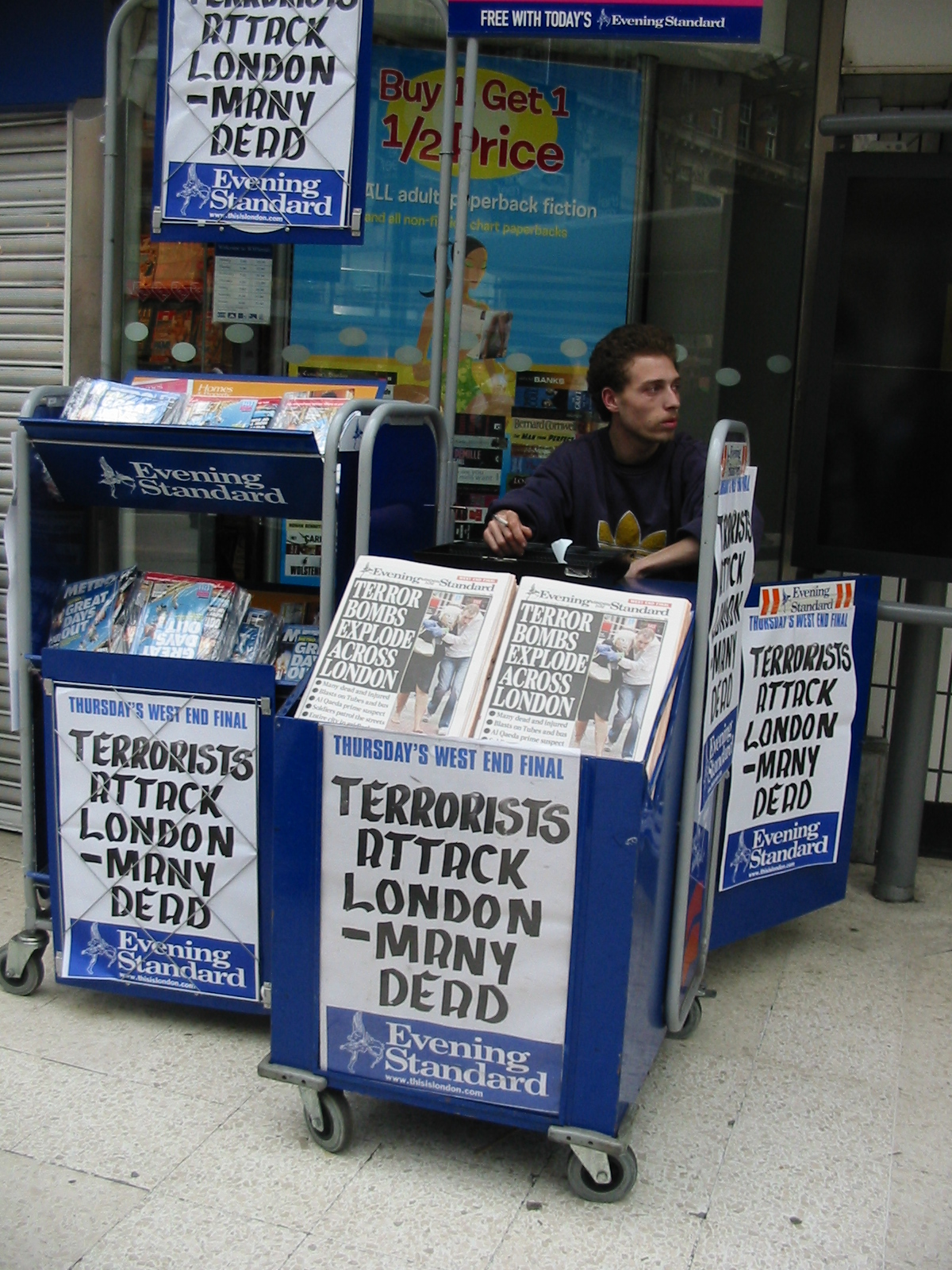
An Evening Standard newspaper stand outside Waterloo station with headlines reporting on the day's attacks

There were limited reactions to the attack in the world economy as measured by financial market and exchange rate activity. The value of the British pound decreased 0.89 cents to a 19-month low against the US dollar. The FTSE 100 Index fell by about 200 points during the two hours after the first attack. This was its greatest decrease since the invasion of Iraq, and it triggered the London Stock Exchange's 'Special Measures', restricting panic selling and aimed at ensuring market stability. By the time the market closed, it had recovered to only 71.3 points (1.36%) down on the previous day's three-year closing high. Markets in France, Germany, the Netherlands and Spain also closed about 1% down on the day.

US market indexes increased slightly, partly because the dollar index increased sharply against the pound and the euro. The Dow Jones Industrial Average gained 31.61 to 10,302.29. The NASDAQ Composite Index increased 7.01 to 2,075.66. The S&P 500 increased 2.93 points to 1,197.87 after decreasing as much as 1%. Every benchmark value gained 0.3%.

The market values increased again on 8 July as it became clear that the damage caused by the bombings was not as great as thought initially. By end of trading the market had recovered fully to above its level at start of trading on 7 July. Insurers in the UK tend to reinsure their terrorist liabilities in excess of the first £75,000,000 with Pool Re, a mutual insurer established by the government with major insurers. Pool Re has substantial reserves and newspaper reports indicated that claims would easily be funded.

On 9 July, the Bank of England, HM Treasury and the Financial Services Authority revealed that they had instigated contingency plans immediately after the attacks to ensure that the UK financial markets could keep trading. This involved the activation of a "secret chatroom" on the British government's Financial Sector Continuity website, which allowed the institutions to communicate with the country's banks and market dealers.

=== Media response ===
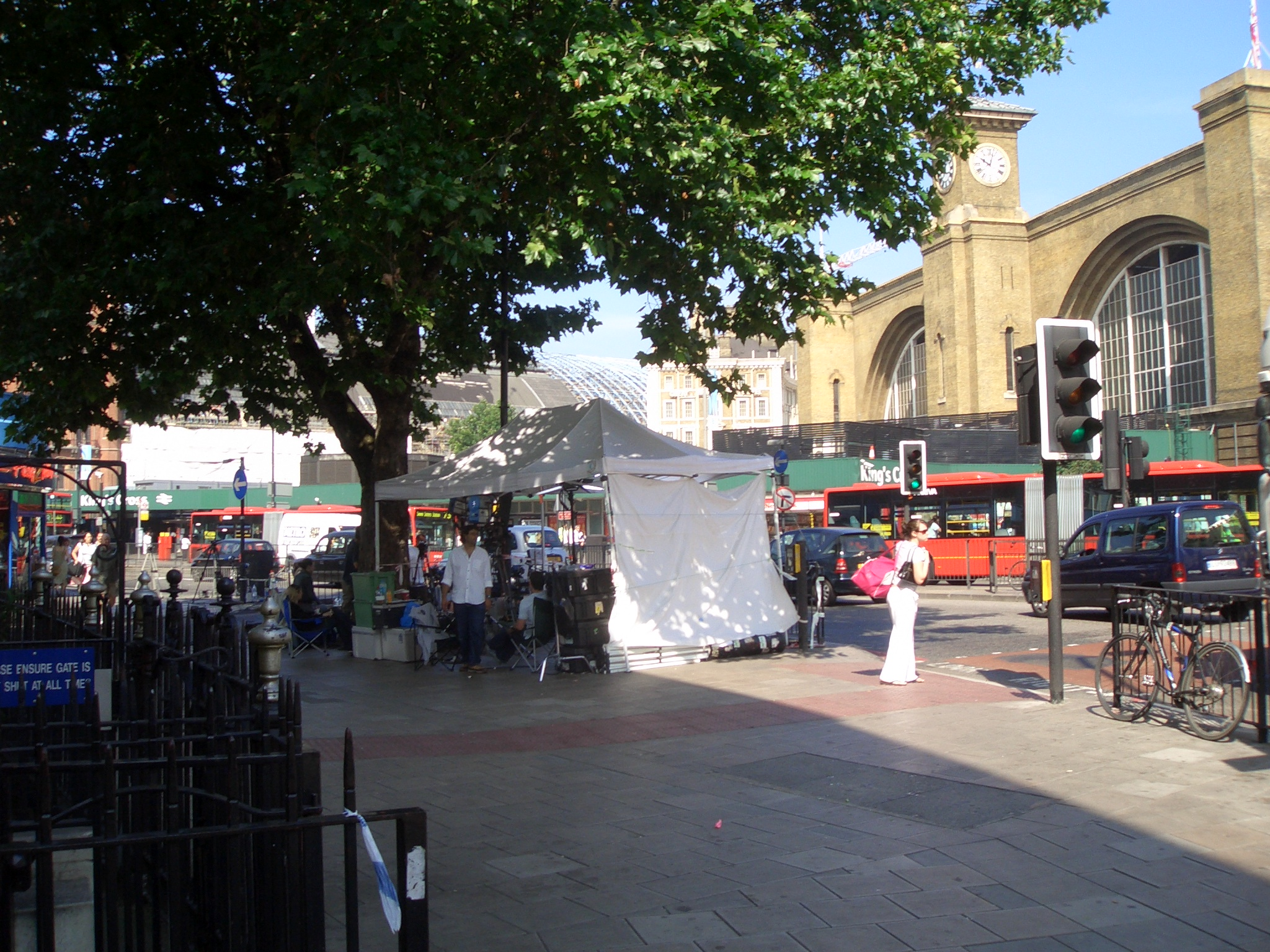
TV news tent at King's Cross station

Continuous news coverage of the attacks was broadcast throughout 7 July, by both BBC One and ITV, uninterrupted until 7:00 p.m., although the BBC stuck with initial reports of a power surge on the London Underground until actual events could be corroborated. Sky News did not broadcast any advertisements for 24 hours. ITN confirmed later that its coverage on ITV was its longest uninterrupted on-air news broadcast of its 50-year history. Television coverage was notable for the use of mobile telephone footage sent in by members of the public and live pictures from traffic CCTV cameras.

The BBC Online website recorded an all-time bandwidth peak of 11 Gb/s at midday on 7 July. BBC News received some 1 billion total accesses throughout the course of the day (including all images, text and HTML), serving some 5.5 terabytes of data. At peak times during the day there were 40,000 page requests per second for the BBC News website. The previous day's announcement of the 2012 Summer Olympics being awarded to London resulted in up to 5 Gb/s. The previous all-time maximum for the website followed the announcement of the Michael Jackson verdict, which used 7.2 Gb/s.

On 12 July, it was reported that the British National Party released leaflets showing images of the 'No. 30 bus' after it was destroyed. The slogan, "Maybe now it's time to start listening to the BNP" was printed beside the photo. Home Secretary Charles Clarke described it as an attempt by the BNP to "cynically exploit the current tragic events in London to further their spread of hatred".

Some media outside the UK complained that successive British governments had been unduly tolerant towards radical Islamist militants, so long as they were involved in activities outside the UK. Britain's alleged reluctance to extradite or prosecute terrorist suspects resulted in London being dubbed "Londonistan" by French intelligence in the mid 1990s, the term was popularised in the UK by columnist Melanie Phillips.

=== Claims of responsibility ===
Even before the identity of the bombers became known, former Metropolitan Police commissioner Lord Stevens said he believed they were almost certainly born or based in Britain, and would not "fit the caricature al-Qaeda fanatic from some backward village in Algeria or Afghanistan". The attacks would have required extensive preparation and prior reconnaissance efforts, and a familiarity with bomb-making and the London transport network as well as access to significant amounts of bomb-making equipment and chemicals.

On 13 August, quoting police and MI5 sources, The Independent reported that the bombers acted independently of an al-Qaeda terror mastermind some place abroad.

On 1 September, it was reported that al-Qaeda officially claimed responsibility for the attacks in a videotape broadcast by the Arab television network Al Jazeera. However, an official inquiry by the British government reported that the tape claiming responsibility had been edited after the attacks, and that the bombers did not have direct assistance from al-Qaeda.

Zabi uk-Taifi, an al-Qaeda commander arrested in Pakistan in January 2009, may have had connections to the bombings, according to Pakistani intelligence sources.

Documents found by German authorities on a terrorist suspect arrested in Berlin in May 2011 suggest that Rashid Rauf, a British al-Qaeda operative, played a key role in planning the attacks.

==== Abu Hafs al-Masri Brigades ====
A second claim of responsibility was made by another al-Qaeda allied group, Abu Hafs al-Masri Brigades. The group had, however, previously falsely claimed responsibility for events that were the result of technical problems, such as the 2003 London blackout and the US Northeast blackout of 2003.

=== Response of Muslim faith groups ===
Within hours of the bombings, various Islamic religious groups had condemned the attacks and distanced themselves from the perpetrators. Sir Iqbal Sacranie of the Muslim Council of Britain stated that the perpetrators were not true Muslims as their acts were contrary to Islamic beliefs. On 18 July, more than 500 British Muslim religious leaders issued a fatwa (decree), condemning the bombings and stating that the bombings were against the teachings of Islam. Senior Muslim leaders offered support in counter-terrorism efforts, having met the Prime Minister, the Home Secretary and the Met Police Commissioner Sir Ian Blair.

Muslim organisations in Europe also condemned the bombings. The imam of the Prague mosque called the bombers "insane" while the Union of Islamic Communities and Organisations in Italy said that "terrorism is incompatible with the doctrine, law and culture of Islam" and expressed its incontrovertible "condemnation of actions that lead to the massacre of innocent people" and its "repugnance" at the "blasphemous use of the Qu'ran".

=== Effects on Muslim community and hate crimes ===
In the immediate aftermath of the bombings, there was a sharp temporary rise in faith hate crimes, directed mostly at British Muslims. There were also acts of arson against mosques and Sikh temples. Muslims reported that they felt more anxious about going out in public or to work, in fear of anti-Muslim reprisals by individuals. A British Medical Journal psychological study found that 61 percent of Muslim commuters in London suffered "substantial stress" in the days after the attacks.

According to a book by Chris Allen published in 2005, the British media had before the bombings portrayed Muslims in a highly derogatory way and failed to distinguish between mainstream Muslims and extremist groups. There had also been a growing trend in young British Muslims feeling "alienated" with the British state, fuelled especially by the UK's foreign policy regarding the Iraq War. A YouGov poll showed that 88% of British Muslims did not justify the bombings, while 6% did.

There was also some criticism against the government. In 2006, government statements such as the Prime Minister's claim that moderate Muslims were not doing enough to tackle extremists, was met with disapproval by Hammasa Kohistani, who called it a "huge stereotype of the Islamic community" that is fuelling hostility.

=== Conspiracy theories ===
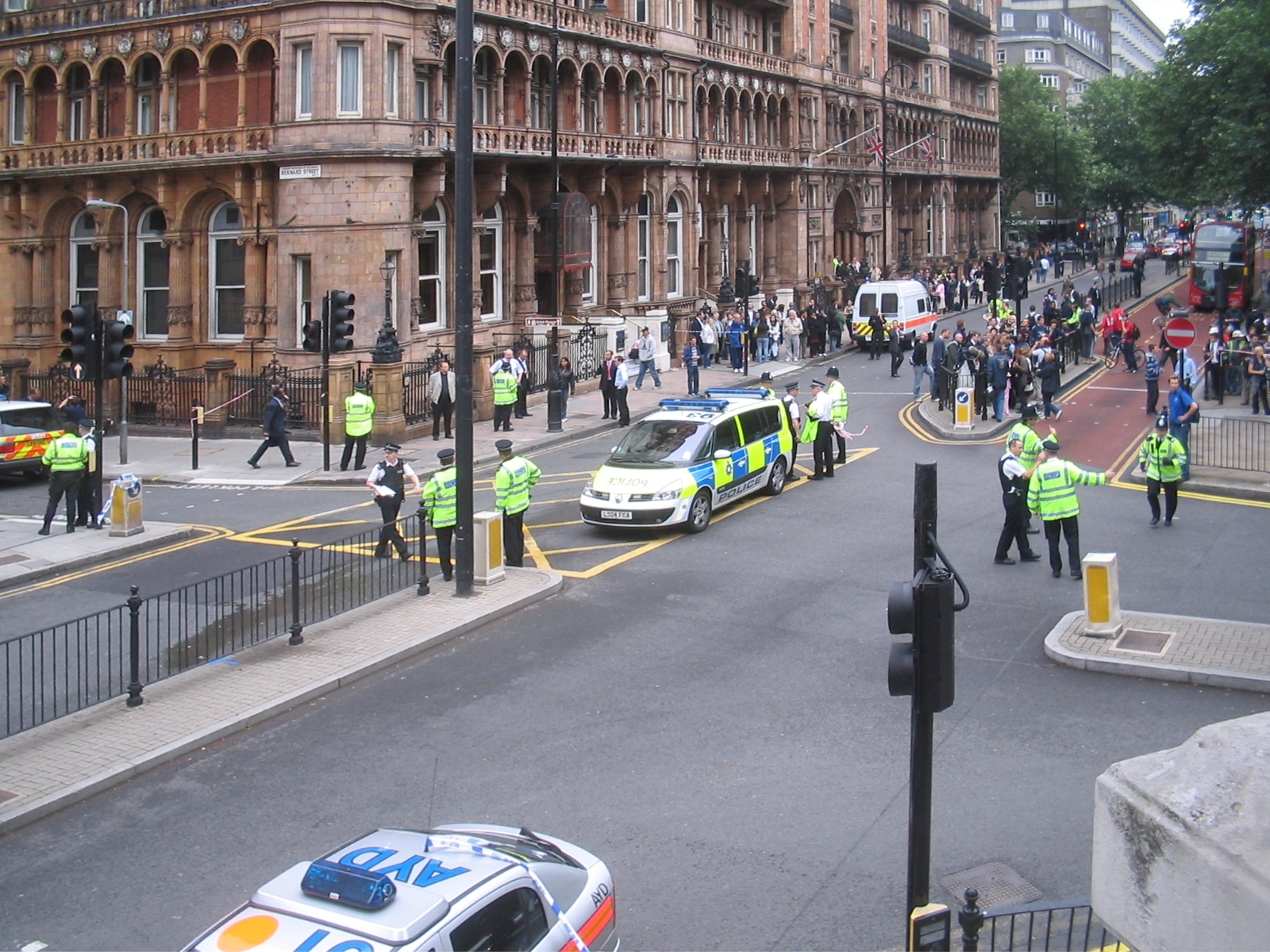
Police cordon off Russell Square on 7 July 2005

A survey of 500 British Muslims undertaken by Channel 4 News in 2007 found that 24% believed the four bombers blamed for the attacks did not perform them.

There have been various conspiracy theories proposed about the bombings, including the suggestion that the bombers were 'patsies', based on claims about timings of the trains and the train from Luton, supposed explosions underneath the carriages, and allegations of the faking of the one time-stamped and dated photograph of the bombers at Luton station. Claims made by one theorist in the Internet video 7/7 Ripple Effect were examined by the BBC documentary series The Conspiracy Files, in an episode titled "7/7" first broadcast on 30 June 2009, which debunked many of the video's claims.

On the day of the bombings, Peter Power of Visor Consultants gave interviews on BBC Radio 5 Live and ITV saying that he was working on a crisis management simulation drill, in the City of London, "based on simultaneous bombs going off precisely at the railway stations where it happened this morning", when he heard that an attack was going on in real life. He described this as a coincidence. He also gave an interview to the Manchester Evening News where he spoke of "an exercise involving mock broadcasts when it happened for real". After a few days he dismissed it as a "spooky coincidence" on Canadian TV.

Iranian state newspaper editorials claimed that the bombings were a setup by British or American authorities seeking to further justify the war on terror and increase harassment of Muslims in Europe.

Alexander Litvinenko, a former officer of Russia's Federal Security Service, was asked who he thought the culprits of the attacks were. Litvinenko replied, "I know only one organization, which has made terrorism the main tool of solving of political problems. It is the Russian special services."

=== Cultural influence ===
Both the events and aftermath of the bombings heavily influenced Bloc Party's 2007 single "Hunting for Witches", which features the lyrics: "The newscaster says the enemy is among us / As bombs explode on the 30 bus". Upon the song's release, the band faced criticism as a result of its release being two days after the bombing's second anniversary.

Stereophonics' 2007 single "It Means Nothing" was written about the bombings.

== Investigation ==
=== Initial findings ===
Numbers of fatalities
Aldgate	7
Edgware Road	6
King's Cross	26
Tavistock Square	13
Total of victims killed	52
Suicide bombers	4
Total fatalities	56

Initially, there were conflicting reports as to the origin, method and even timing of the explosions. Forensic examiners initially thought that military-grade plastic explosives had been used, and, as the blasts were thought to have been simultaneous, that synchronised timed detonators had been employed. These hypotheses changed as more information became available. The explosive was initially identified as triacetone triperoxide, According to a May 2006 report from the British government's Intelligence and Security Committee, home-made organic peroxide-based devices were used, which was described at the coroner's inquest as an "entirely unique" mixture of concentrated hydrogen peroxide and pepper.

Fifty-six people, including the four suicide bombers, were killed by the attacks and about 700 were injured, of whom about 100 were hospitalised for at least one night. The incident was the deadliest single act of terrorism in the United Kingdom since the 1988 bombing of Pan Am Flight 103–which exploded over Lockerbie, killing 270 people–and the deadliest bombing in London since the Second World War.

Police examined about 2,500 items of CCTV footage and forensic evidence from the scenes of the attacks. The bombs were probably placed on the floors of the trains and bus. Investigators identified four men whom they alleged had been the suicide bombers. This made the bombings the first-ever suicide attack in the UK.

Vincent Cannistraro, former head of the Central Intelligence Agency's anti-terrorism centre, told The Guardian that "two unexploded bombs" were recovered as well as "mechanical timing devices"; this claim was explicitly rejected by London's Metropolitan Police Service.

In autumn 2005 it was revealed that three of the bombers had carried out a practice run one week before the attacks.

=== Police raids ===
West Yorkshire Police raided six properties in the Leeds area on 12 July: two houses in Beeston, two in Thornhill, one in Holbeck and one in Alexandra Grove in Hyde Park. One man was arrested. Officers also raided a residential property on Northern Road in the Buckinghamshire town of Aylesbury on 13 July.

The police service say a significant amount of explosive material was found in the Leeds raids and a controlled explosion was carried out at one of the properties. Explosives were also found in the vehicle associated with one of the bombers, Shehzad Tanweer, at Luton railway station and subjected to controlled explosion.

=== Luton cell ===
There was speculation about a possible association between the bombers and another alleged Islamist cell in Luton which was ended during August 2004. The Luton group was uncovered after Muhammad Naeem Noor Khan was arrested in Lahore, Pakistan. His laptop computer was said to contain plans for tube attacks in London, as well as attacks on financial buildings in New York City and Washington, D.C. The group was subject to surveillance but on 2 August 2004 The New York Times published Khan's name, citing Pakistani sources. The news leak forced police in Britain and Canada to make arrests before their investigations were complete.

When the Luton cell was ended, one of the London bombers, Mohammad Sidique Khan (no known relation), was scrutinised briefly by MI5 who determined that he was not a likely threat and he was not surveilled.

=== March 2007 arrests ===
On 22 March 2007, three people were arrested in connection with these bombings. Two were arrested at 1 p.m. at Manchester Airport, attempting to board a flight bound for Pakistan that afternoon. They were apprehended by undercover officers who had been following the men as part of a surveillance operation. They had not intended to arrest the men that day, but believed they could not risk letting the suspects leave the country. A third man was arrested in the Beeston area of Leeds at an address on the street where one of the suicide bombers had lived before the attacks.

=== May 2007 arrests ===
On 9 May 2007, police made four further arrests, three in Yorkshire and one in Selly Oak, Birmingham. The widow of the presumed ringleader Mohammed Sidique Khan, was among those arrested for "commissioning, preparing or instigating acts of terrorism".

Three of those arrested, including Khan's widow, were released on 15 May. The fourth, Khalid Khaliq, an unemployed single father of three, was charged on 17 July 2007 with possessing an al-Qaeda training manual, but the charge was not related to the 2005 London attacks. Conviction for possession of a document containing information likely to be useful to a person committing or preparing an act of terrorism carried a maximum ten-year jail sentence.

=== Deportation of Abdullah el-Faisal ===
Abdullah el-Faisal was deported to Jamaica, his country of origin, from Britain on 25 May 2006 after reaching the parole date in his prison sentence. He was found guilty of three charges of soliciting the murder of Jews, Americans and Hindus and two charges of using threatening words to incite racial hatred in 2003 and, despite an appeal, was sentenced to seven years imprisonment. In 2006 John Reid alleged to MPs that el-Faisal had influenced Jamaican-born Briton Germaine Lindsay into participating in the 7/7 bombings.

=== Investigation into Mohammad Sidique Khan ===
Khan, then unknown to MI5, had been captured on camera at an al-Qaeda-connected training camp in Cumbria in 2001; and in 2004 (his identity still unknown), he was seen meeting another group of bomb conspirators and his movements back to Leeds were tracked by a MI5 team. "Despite being seen meeting other men of real concern, he was never made a priority for investigation", the BBC reported.

The Guardian reported on 3 May 2007 that police had investigated Mohammad Sidique Khan twice during 2005. The newspaper said it "learned that on 27 January 2005, police took a statement from the manager of a garage in Leeds which had loaned Khan a courtesy car while his vehicle was being repaired". It also said that "on the afternoon of 3 February an officer from Scotland Yard's anti-terrorism branch carried out inquiries with the company which had insured a car in which Khan was seen driving almost a year earlier". Nothing about these inquiries appeared in the report by parliament's intelligence and security committee after it investigated the 7 July attacks. Scotland Yard described the 2005 inquiries as "routine", while security sources said they were related to the fertiliser bomb plot.

=== Reports of warnings ===
While no warnings before 7 July bombings have been documented officially or acknowledged, the following are sometimes quoted as indications either of the events to come or of some foreknowledge.

- One of the London bombers, Mohammad Sidique Khan, was briefly scrutinised by MI5 who determined that he was not a likely threat and he was not put under surveillance.
- Some news stories, current a few hours after the attacks, questioned the British government's contention that there had not been any warning or prior intelligence. It was reported by CBS News that a senior Israeli official said that British police told the Israeli embassy in London minutes before the explosions that they had received warnings of possible terror attacks in the UK capital. An AP report used by a number of news sites, including The Guardian, attributed the initial report of a warning to an Israeli "Foreign Ministry official, speaking on condition of anonymity", but added Foreign Minister Silvan Shalom's later denial on Israel Defense Forces Radio: "There was no early information about terrorist attacks." A similar report on the site of right-wing Israeli paper Israel National News/Arutz Sheva attributed the story to "Army Radio quoting unconfirmed reliable sources." Although the report has been retracted, the original stories are still circulated as a result of their presence on the news websites' archives.
- In an interview with the Portuguese newspaper Público a month after the 2004 Madrid train bombings, Syrian-born cleric Omar Bakri Muhammad warned that "a very well-organised" London-based group which he called "al-Qaeda Europe" was "on the verge of launching a big operation." In December 2004, Bakri vowed that, if Western governments did not change their policies, Muslims would give them "a 9/11, day after day after day."
- According to a 17 November 2004 post on the Newsweek website, US authorities in 2004 had evidence that terrorists were planning a possible attack in London. In addition, the article stated that, "fears of terror attacks have prompted FBI agents based in the U.S. embassy in London to avoid travelling on London's popular underground railway (or tube) system."
- In an interview published by the German magazine Bild am Sonntag dated 10 July 2005, Meir Dagan, director of the Israeli intelligence agency Mossad, said that the agency's office in London was alerted to the impending attack at 8:43 a.m., six minutes before the first bomb detonated. The warning of a possible attack was a result of an investigation into an earlier terrorist bombing in Tel Aviv, which may have been related to the London bombings.

=== Anwar al-Awlaki ===
The Daily Telegraph reported that radical imam Anwar al-Awlaki had inspired the bombers. The bombers transcribed lectures of al-Awlaki while plotting the bombings. His materials were found in the possession of accused accomplices of the suicide bombers. Al-Awlaki was killed by a US drone attack in 2011.

=== Independent inquest ===
In 2006, the government refused to hold a public inquiry, stating that "it would be a ludicrous diversion". Prime Minister Tony Blair said an independent inquiry would "undermine support" for MI5, while the leader of the opposition, David Cameron, said only a full inquiry would "get to the truth". In reaction to revelations about the extent of security service investigations into the bombers prior to the attack, the Shadow Home Secretary, David Davis, said: "It is becoming more and more clear that the story presented to the public and Parliament is at odds with the facts."

After Cameron became Prime Minister in 2010, an independent coroner's inquest of the bombings began. Lady Justice Hallett was appointed to hear the inquest, which would consider how each victim died and whether MI5, if it had worked better, could have prevented the attack, and also the emergency service response.

After seven months of evidence and deliberation, the verdict of the inquiry was released and read in the Houses of Parliament on 9 May 2011. It determined that the 52 victims had been unlawfully killed; their deaths could not have been prevented, and they would probably have died "whatever time the emergency services reached and rescued them". Hallett concluded that MI5 had not made every possible improvement since the attacks but that it was not "right or fair" to say more attention should have been paid to ringleader Mohammad Sidique Khan prior to 7 July. She also decided that there should be no public inquiry.

The report provided nine recommendations to various bodies:

1. With reference to a photograph of Khan and Shehzad Tanweer which was so badly cropped by MI5 that the pair was virtually unrecognisable to the US authorities asked to review it, the inquiry recommended that procedures be improved so that humans asked to view photographs are shown them in best possible quality.
2. In relation to the suggestion that MI5 failed to realise the suspects were important quickly enough, the inquiry recommended that MI5 improves the way it records decisions relating to suspect assessment.
3. The inquiry recommended that 'major incident' training for all frontline staff, especially those working on the Underground, is reviewed.
4. With regards to the facts that London Underground (LU) is unable to declare a 'major incident' itself and that LU was not invited to an emergency meeting at Scotland Yard at 10:30 a.m. on the morning of the bombings, the inquiry recommends that the way Transport for London (TfL) and the London resilience team are alerted to major incidents and the way the emergency services are informed is reviewed.
5. Regarding the confusion on 7 July 2005 over the emergency rendezvous point, it was recommended that a common initial rendezvous point is permanently staffed and advised to emergency services;
6. In response to the evidence that some firefighters refused to walk on the tracks at Aldgate to reach the bombed train because they had not received confirmation that the electric current had been switched off, the inquiry recommended a review into how emergency workers confirm whether the current is off after a major incident.
7. A recommendation was made that TfL reviewed the provision of stretchers and first aid equipment at Underground stations.
8. Training of London Ambulance Service (LAS) staff of "multi-casualty triage" should be reviewed, following concerns in the inquest that some casualties were not actually treated by paramedics who had triaged them.
9. A final recommendation was made to the Department of Health, the Mayor of London and the London resilience team to review the capability and funding of emergency medical care in the city.

=== Alleged newspaper phone hacking ===
It was reported in July 2011 that relatives of some of the victims of the bombings may have had their telephones accessed by the News of the World in the aftermath of the attacks. The revelations added to an existing controversy over phone hacking by the tabloid newspaper.

The fathers of two victims, one in the Edgware Road blast and another at Russell Square, told the BBC that police officers investigating the alleged hacking had warned them that their contact details were found on a target list, while a former firefighter who helped injured passengers escape from Edgware Road also said he had been contacted by police who were looking into the hacking allegations. A number of survivors from the bombed trains also revealed that police had warned them their phones may have been accessed and their messages intercepted, and in some cases officers advised them to change security codes and PINs.

== Memorials ==
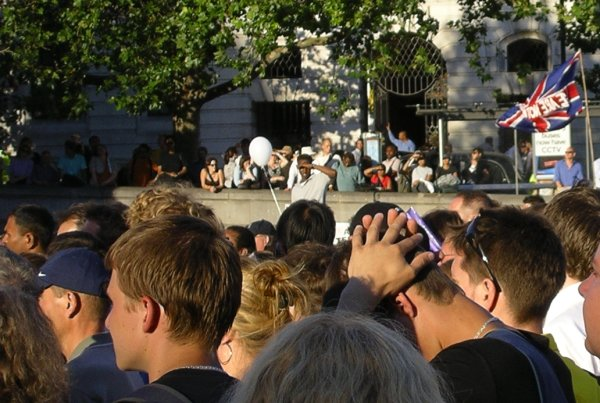
People observing a two-minute silence in Trafalgar Square on the evening of 14 July 2005

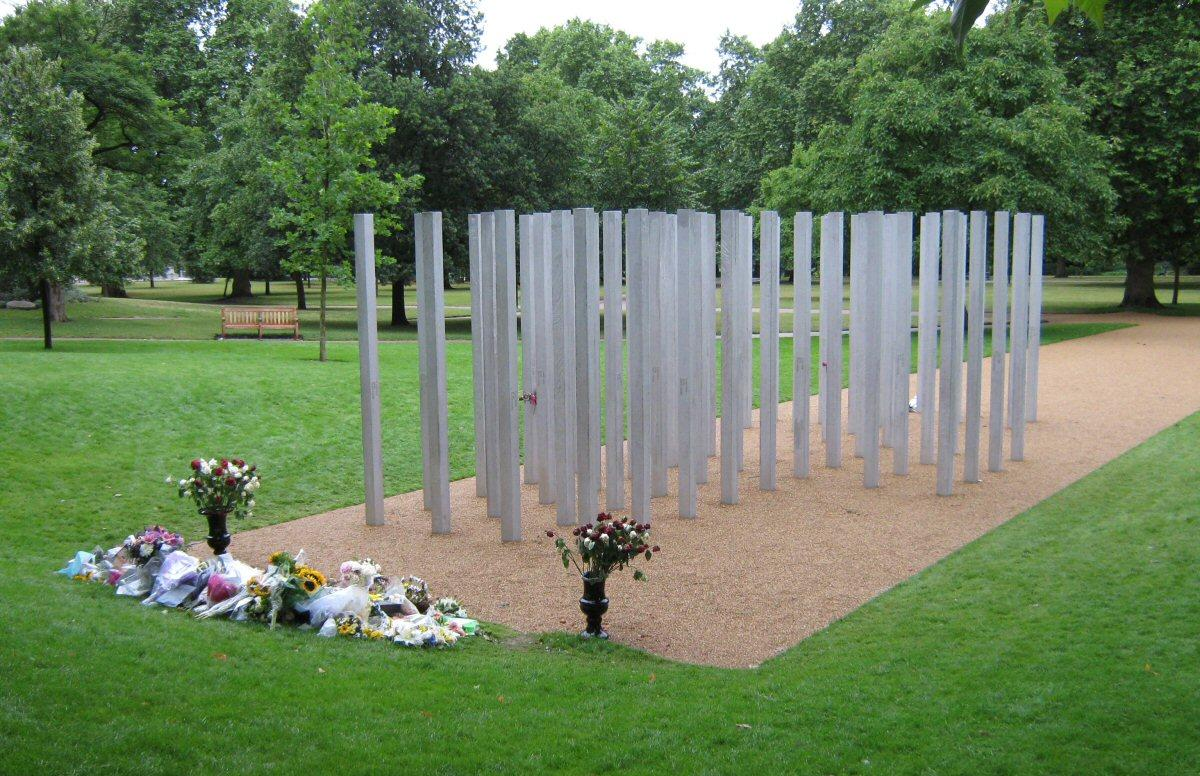
The 7 July Memorial in Hyde Park

Since the bombings, the United Kingdom and other nations have honoured the victims in several ways. Most of these memorials have included moments of silence, candlelit vigils, and the laying of flowers at the attack sites. Foreign leaders have also remembered the dead by ordering their flags to be flown at half-mast, signing books of condolences at embassies of the UK, and issuing messages of support and condolences to the British people.

=== United Kingdom ===
The government ordered the Union Flag to be flown at half-mast on 8 July. The following day, the Bishop of London led prayers for the victims during a service paying tribute to the role of women during the Second World War. A vigil, called by the Stop the War Coalition, Campaign for Nuclear Disarmament and Muslim Association of Britain, was held from 5 p.m., at Friends Meeting House on Euston Road.

A two-minute silence was held on 14 July 2005 throughout Europe. Thousands attended a vigil at 6 p.m. on Trafalgar Square. After an initial silence there was a series of speakers for two hours. A memorial service was held at St Paul's Cathedral on 1 November 2005. To mark the first anniversary of the attack, a two-minute silence was observed at midday across the country.

A permanent memorial was unveiled in 2009 by Charles, Prince of Wales in Hyde Park to mark the fourth anniversary of the bombings. On the eve of the ninth anniversary of the attacks in 2014 the memorial was defaced with messages including "Blair lied, thousands died". The graffiti was removed within hours. A second permanent memorial was unveiled at Tavistock Square in 2018.

During the opening ceremony of the 2012 Olympic Games in London a minute's silence was held to commemorate those killed in the attacks.

A memorial service was held in St. Paul's Cathedral on 7 July 2015, to mark the tenth anniversary of the bombings. This was broadcast on BBC One.

A memorial service was held on 7 July 2025 to mark the twentieth anniversary, attended by survivors, bereaved families, members of the royal family including the Duke and Duchess of Edinburgh, and political leaders such as Prime Minister Sir Keir Starmer, Home Secretary Yvette Cooper, Mayor of London Sir Sadiq Khan, and former prime ministers Sir Tony Blair and Theresa May.

=== International ===
US President George W. Bush visited the British embassy the day after the bombings, upon his return from the G8 summit in Scotland, and signed a book of condolence. In Washington, D.C., the US Army band played "God Save the Queen" (the British national anthem, the melody of which is also used in an American patriotic hymn, "My Country, 'Tis of Thee"), a suggestion that US Army veteran John Miska made to Vice Chief of Staff General Cody, outside the British embassy in the city. A similar tribute had been made by the Queen in the days following the September 11 attacks in 2001 where "The Star-Spangled Banner" played at Buckingham Palace's Changing the Guard. On 12 July, a Detroit Symphony Orchestra brass ensemble played the British national anthem during the pre-game festivities of the Major League Baseball All-Star Game at Comerica Park in Detroit.

Flags were ordered to fly at half-mast across Australia, New Zealand, and Canada. The Union Flag was raised to half-mast alongside the Flag of Australia on Sydney Harbour Bridge as a show of "sympathy between nations".

Moments of silence were observed in the European Parliament, the Polish parliament and by the Irish parliament on 14 July. The British national anthem was played at the changing of the Royal Guard at Plaza de Oriente in Madrid in memorial to the victims of the attacks. The ceremony was attended by the British ambassador to Spain and members of the Spanish Royal Family. After the 2004 Madrid train bombings, the UK had hosted a similar ceremony at Buckingham Palace.

== Planned anniversary attack ==
Mohammed Rehman and Sana Ahmed Khan were sentenced to life imprisonment on 29 December 2015 for preparing an act of terrorism, planning to coincide with the tenth anniversary of the 7/7 attacks. They had 10 kilograms (22 lb) of urea nitrate. Rehman called himself the 'silent bomber' and asked his Twitter followers to choose between Westfield London or the London Underground for the planned suicide bomb.

== See also ==
- 7/7 Ripple Effect – 2007 homemade conspiracy theory film about the 7/7 bombings
- Gill Hicks – Australian motivational speaker, author and curator, who had both legs amputated below the knee as a result of the bombings
- Martine Wright – who lost both her legs while travelling to work in the Aldgate underground bombing and later became a Paralympic athlete
- List of terrorist incidents in London
- List of Islamist terrorist attacks
