= Finsbury Park (area) =

Area in north London, England

Coordinates: 51.5683°N 0.1031°W

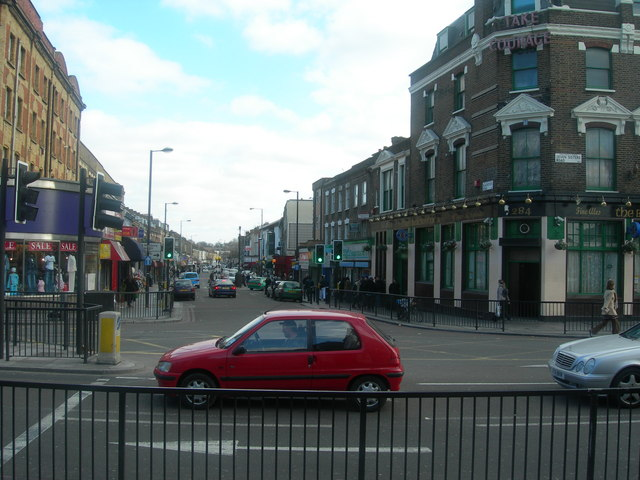

- Location within Greater London
- Population: 14,358 (2011 Census – partial)
- OS grid reference: TQ314872
- London borough: Islington; Haringey; Hackney
- Ceremonial county: Greater London
- Region: London
- Country: England
- Sovereign state: United Kingdom
- Post town: LONDON
- Postcode district: N4
- Dialling code: 020
- Police: Metropolitan
- Fire: London
- Ambulance: London
- UK Parliament: Islington North Hackney North and Stoke Newington
- London Assembly: North East; Enfield and Haringey

Finsbury Park is an area in north London, England, which grew up around an important railway interchange near the convergence of the Boroughs of Islington and Hackney and is named after the park in Haringey.

Finsbury Park should not be confused with Finsbury, which is a district of Central London roughly three miles to the south, forming the south-eastern part of the London Borough of Islington.

== Geography ==
The area is centred on Finsbury Park station, a major bus, rail and tube interchange near the southern end of the 46-hectare (110-acre) public park of the same name.

The neighbourhood includes part of Finsbury Park and Highbury West wards within the London Borough of Islington, part of Brownswood ward in the London Borough of Hackney, part of Stroud Green Ward and a very small part of Harringay ward in the London Borough of Haringey.

== Locale ==
The area is distinctly cosmopolitan and urban, as reflected by the variety of shops and establishments on Seven Sisters Road, Blackstock Road and Stroud Green Road. The North London Central Mosque (also known as the Finsbury Park Mosque) is located here. Arsenal Football Club's Emirates Stadium is nearby. Right across from the park is the N4 library, part of the Islington public libraries service, which stands alongside the City and Islington College Centre for Lifelong Learning building.

== Demographics ==
The centre of Finsbury Park has a larger than average immigrant population with a lower level of residents born in the UK than the national average and a higher rate of residents either born in EU countries or outside the EU. This composition is probably not fully representative of the whole neighbourhood.

=== Demographic history ===
Scottish and Welsh Presbyterian churches reflect patterns of immigration into London from other regions of the United Kingdom. Welsh-language poet Dewi Emrys and Timothy Eynon Davies were among those who ministered in the district in the late 19th and early 20th centuries.

The 1960s and 1970s saw a large influx of Bangladeshis alongside pockets of Pakistanis, Indians and Burmese who settled in the borough. Many moved to surrounding locales as their economic prowess grew in the 1980s. They made significant contributions to local business and politics as well as to religious institutions (e.g. the founding of the original Finsbury Park Mosque. A number of immigrant-led businesses opened on Blackstock Road, an area associated with the Algerian immigrant community amongst others.

There had been a large minority of the African Caribbean diaspora arriving in the area bordering Manor House throughout the same period and as early as the Windrush generation. Greek Cypriots and later Turkish Cypriots started to arrive in the 1960s and 70s as economic migrants firmly establishing themselves in business through the clothing trade on Fonthill Road.

In the 1980s and 90s, immigrants included significant populations of Somalis populating the area as refugees and asylum seekers at the height of the crisis in their homeland and more recent arrivals of settled EU nationals from Scandinavian countries. The top of Blackstock Road is colloquially called "little Algiers" because of the large North African presence in the area.

== Nearest places ==
- Harringay
- Highbury
- Holloway
- Manor House
- Stroud Green

== Finsbury Park attack ==
In June 2017 the Finsbury Park attack against the Muslim Welfare House drew national and international attention.
