= List of attacks on mosques in the United Kingdom =

Islamophobia in the United Kingdom has manifested in many violent attacks on Muslim institutions such as mosques and cultural centres. In 2022 a report by Muslim Engagement and Development found that about 42% of mosques in the United Kingdom experienced religiously motivated attacks in the preceding three years. Between July and October 2025, 25 mosques were attacked. In the year to July 2026 more than 70 attacks on mosques in the UK have been recorded, about one every 5 days.

== Attacks ==
Date	Target	Location	Perpetrator (motive)	Details
March 2005	Islamic Cultural Centre	Ivy Arch Road, Worthing	One man jailed for three years for arson.	
13 February 2011	Mid Sussex Islamic Centre & Masjid	Wivelsfield Road, Haywards Heath	Three young men convicted for arson, theft of paraffin and a public order offence which involved racially or religiously aggravated fear of violence.	Damage caused to building.
3 December 2011	Mosque	Stoke-on-Trent	Two men jailed for arson with intent to endanger life. Suggested to be revenge for alleged burning of Remembrance poppies.	One perpetrator was a former member of English Defence League and British National Party.
June 2013	Masjid-E-Noor mosque	Ryecroft Street, Gloucester	Two men jailed for arson with reckless endangerment to life.	Both perpetrators were members of the English Defence League.
8 March 2014	Mosque	Manor Road, Bletchley	One man jailed for arson with intent to endanger life and a racially and religiously aggravated public order offence.	
27 November 2015	Finsbury Park Mosque	Finsbury Park, London		Man caught on CCTV trying to set alight a jerry can filled with petrol before throwing it into the mosque's grounds, though it did not explode. Police treated as an Islamophobic hate crime.
19 June 2017	Muslim pedestrians near the Muslim Welfare House and Finsbury Park Mosque	Finsbury Park, London	A man intentionally drove a van into a crowd of Muslim pedestrians resulting in the death of a man and 11 injuries. The attack was found to be motivated by Islamophobia.	
19 July 2017	Nasfat Islamic Centre	Newton Heath, Manchester		Man arrested under suspicion of committing an arson attack, police said a window was forced open and an "unknown accelerant" placed inside. Police treated as a "hate crime".
10 November 2019	Bevan House Mosque	Camp Roads, Haverhill, Suffolk		A person smashed a window to gain access before deliberately starting a fire on top of the building's prayer rooms.
10 September 2021	Didsbury Mosque	Burton Road, Didsbury		Arson attack where beer cans filled with petrol were set alight at door. Police treated as an Islamophobic hate crime.
8 August 2023	Northbrooks mosque	Harlow, Essex		Arson attack that police suspect was racially aggravated.
10 August 2024	Mosque	Newtownards, Northern Ireland		A petrol bomb thrown at a mosque during the 2024 United Kingdom riots.
20 June 2025	Islamic Centre	University Road, Belfast	A man charged with a number of offences including attempted arson with intent to endanger life, attempt to cause an explosion, making explosives with intent to endanger life and criminal damage.	A viable explosive device was thrown through the window.
28 June 2025	Masjid Aqsa mosque	Blackburn		Set alight after a window was broken.
24 September 2025	Clarkston Community Centre Mosque	East Renfrewshire		A pole was thrown through a window while children were inside.
4 October 2025	Peacehaven mosque	Peacehaven, East Sussex		Two masked individuals spraying an accelerant on the front door before igniting a fire.
5 October 2025	Mosque	Headlands, Kettering		Attempt made to set fire to a mosque's front door.
