= Islington North in the 2024 United Kingdom general election =

Election to the House of Commons in the Islington North constituency

2024 United Kingdom general election in Islington North
- 4 July 2024

Islington North constituency
- Turnout: 67.5% (▼4.1 pp)
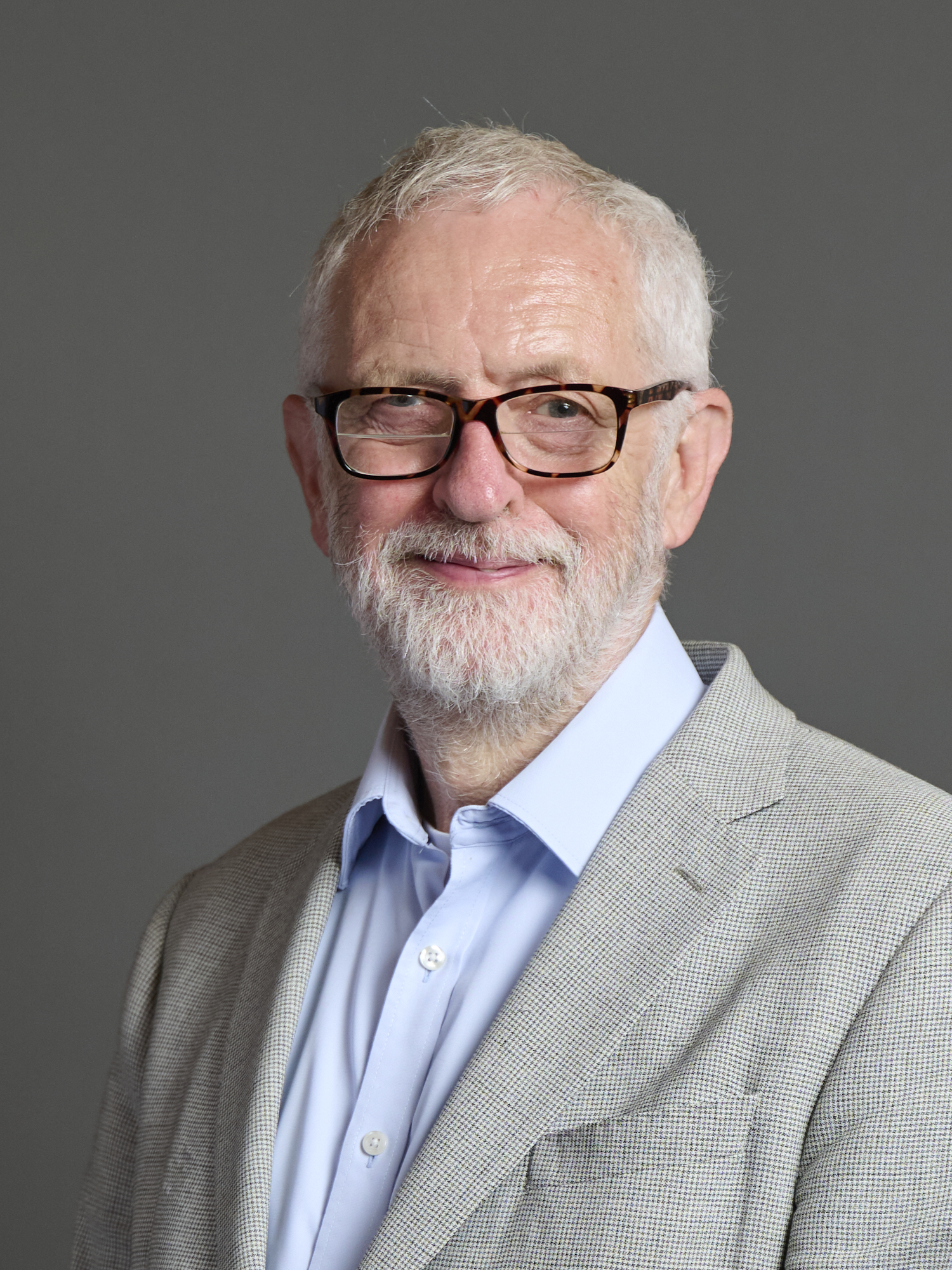
	First party	Second party	Third party
		Lab	Grn
Candidate	Jeremy Corbyn	Praful Nargund	Sheridan Kates
Party	Independent	Labour	Green
Popular vote	24,120	16,873	2,660
Percentage	49.2%	34.4%	5.4%
Swing	N/A	▼29.2 pp	▼2.6 pp
MP before election
Jeremy Corbyn
Independent
Elected MP
Jeremy Corbyn
Independent

An election took place in the north London constituency of Islington North on 4 July 2024, as part of the 2024 general election. Jeremy Corbyn, the former leader of the Labour Party, won the seat by standing as an independent against the official Labour Party candidate, with a majority of 7,247.

Corbyn was not allowed to stand for re-election as a Labour candidate by new Labour leader Keir Starmer following his suspension from the party in 2020. Labour's National Executive Committee said the decision was made because of Corbyn's claims that the media overstated antisemitism in the party under his leadership. Corbyn has repeatedly condemned antisemitism and denied he holds any racist views. After announcing he would stand as an independent candidate at the election, Corbyn was fully expelled from the Labour Party. The Islington Tribune, a local newspaper, described the Islington North election as something we "have not seen before in our lives".

On election day, Corbyn won the election, with a majority of over 7,000.

== Background ==
Jeremy Corbyn began serving as an MP after he won the Islington North seat for Labour in 1983. Media speculation that Corbyn would contest the 2024 general election as an independent was reported in October 2023. Despite reports of "unanimous support" from his Constituency Labour Party (CLP), Corbyn was not permitted to stand as a Labour parliamentary candidate. After announcing on 24 May 2024 that he would stand as an independent parliamentary candidate for Islington North, he was expelled from the Labour Party.

Local councillor and entrepreneur Praful Nargund was selected as the Labour candidate. He denied that his selection had been undemocratic, saying "things needed to get off the ground quickly" after the snap general election was called. While Islington North Labour Party passed a motion thanking Corbyn for his service and supporting the "democratic right to select our MP" in a May 2023 meeting, it was reported that some local Labour members did not support Corbyn. The Win Islington North group, composed of over 100 local Labour Party members, criticised Corbyn's campaign as an independent candidate and pledged support for Nargund.

=== Corbyn endorsements ===
Corbyn was endorsed by Mick Lynch of the National Union of Rail, Maritime and Transport Workers. Left-wing parties such as the Socialist Workers Party and Transform Party also endorsed him, as did The Muslim Vote and locally Mohammed Kozbar, general secretary of Finsbury Park Mosque.

== Campaign ==
The Green Party in the constituency decided to make the election "as boring as possible".

The Conservative and Labour candidates refused to take part in a hustings on healthcare, forcing its cancellation. Labour candidate Praful Nargund kept a low profile during the campaign and restricted his media interviews to a small handful.

On 19 June, Alison McGarry, the chairperson of the Islington North CLP, resigned after being spotted campaigning for Corbyn. On 28 June, leading members of the Islington North Labour Party signed a letter announcing they were resigning, or willing to be expelled, to campaign for Jeremy Corbyn, stating they were "denied the right to choose our own candidate". Signatories of the letter including McGarry, two vice chairs, an assistant secretary and constituency secretary.

Because of the unusual nature of the Islington North election, in mid-June crowdfunding paid for a local poll of voting intentions. The campaign was successful, and the poll was released on 25 June, putting Labour on a 14-point lead over Corbyn.

A few days before election day, Corbyn was reported to be having difficulty getting the message out that he was standing as an independent and not the Labour Party candidate, though it was claimed he and his supporters had visited 25–30,000 addresses in the constituency.

Nargund visited Whittington Hospital in the last week of the campaign, meeting senior staff. He pledged to step back from his business activities if he was elected as MP.

== Opinion polling ==
Dates conducted	Pollster	Client	Sample size	Lab	Corbyn (Ind) (Note: Corbyn was the Labour Party candidate in 2019.)	LD	Con	Grn	Ref	Others	Lead
4 Jul 2024	2024 general election		–	34.4%	49.2%	3.4%	4.0%	5.4%	3.5%	0.4%	14.8
20–25 Jun 2024	Survation	Stats for Lefties	514	43%	29%	7%	6%	7%	6%	2%	14
12 Dec 2019	2019 general election		–	64.3%		15.6%	10.2%	8.0%	1.4%	0.4%	48.7

== Results ==
General election 2024: Islington North
Party	Candidate	Votes	%	±%
Independent	Jeremy Corbyn	24,120	49.2	N/A
Labour	Praful Nargund	16,873	34.4	−29.9
Green	Sheridan Kates	2,660	5.4	−2.6
Conservative	Karen Harries	1,950	4.0	−6.2
Reform	Martyn Nelson	1,710	3.5	+2.1
Liberal Democrats	Vikas Aggarwal	1,661	3.4	−12.2
Independent	Paul Josling	32	0.1	+0.1
Majority		7,247	14.8	N/A
Turnout		49,006	67.5	−4.1
Registered electors		72,582		
Independent gain from Labour		Swing		

A heckler shouted "unlucky, mate" as the Labour Party vote was announced. After the results were announced and Corbyn was declared winner, he gave a victory speech saying the constituency had voted for a "kinder, gentler, more inclusive politics". It was the first time Islington North had failed to elect a Labour MP since 1935.

== Previous result ==
General election 2019: Islington North
Party	Candidate	Votes	%	±%
Labour	Jeremy Corbyn	34,603	64.3	−8.7
Liberal Democrats	Nick Wakeling	8,415	15.6	+6.6
Conservative	James Clark	5,483	10.2	−2.3
Green	Caroline Russell	4,326	8.0	+3.9
Brexit Party	Yosef David	742	1.4	N/A
Monster Raving Loony	Nick The Incredible Flying Brick	236	0.4	+0.2
Majority		26,188	48.7	−11.8
Turnout		53,805	71.6	−1.8
Registered electors		75,162		
Labour hold		Swing		
