= Islam in London =

There were 1,318,755 Muslims reported in the 2021 census in the Greater London area. In the 2021 census Office for National Statistics, the proportion of Muslims in London had risen to 15% of the population, making Islam the second largest religion in the city after Christianity.

== History ==
The first Muslims to settle in London were Bengali and Yemeni sailors from the 19th century. Many Muslims from the Indian sub-continent served in the British Army and British Indian Army in the First and Second World Wars. In the wave of immigration that followed the Second World War, many Muslims emigrated to the UK from these Commonwealth countries and former colonies to satisfy labour shortages and seek new opportunities for themselves. Following the partition of India, many came from Pakistan especially the Punjab and Azad Kashmir in addition to the Indian state of Gujarat. This initial wave of immigration of the 1950s and 60s was followed by migrants from Cyprus, Sylhet in Bangladesh, formerly East Pakistan. Many Muslims also arrived from various other countries, although the percentage is far smaller than from South Asia. Amongst those from other countries, Muslims from Yemen, Somalia and Turkey have significant numbers, whereas those from Malaysia Iraq, Nigeria, Ghana and Kenya represent smaller fractions. Today, London's Muslims come from all over the world and there is a small but growing group of converts.

=== 21st century ===
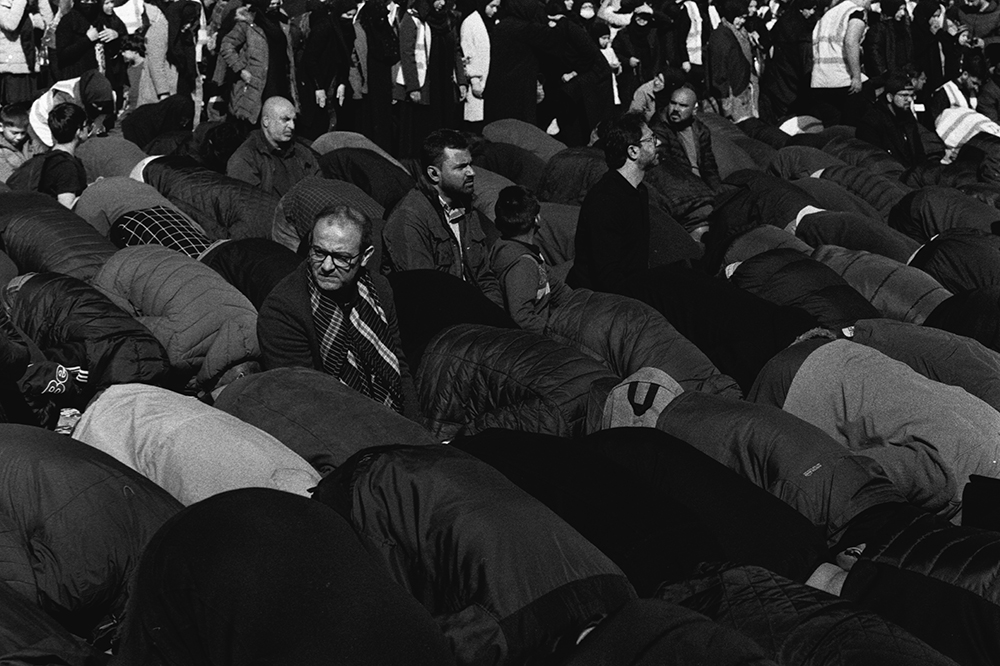
Shia Muslims pray near Marble Arch during the 41st Arbaeen Procession in London, 2021.

Following waves of immigration over the previous decades, London now has one of the most diverse arrays of Muslim communities in the world.

London's Muslims are geographically dispersed with settlements principally shaped by earlier patterns of immigration. The greatest concentration can be found in the east London boroughs of Tower Hamlets, Newham and Redbridge. In these boroughs, Bangladeshis and Pakistanis tend to dominate, along with a significant Indian Muslim population.

Outside of east London, Bangladeshi Muslims have settled throughout the city, in boroughs like Merton, Southwark, and Hackney.

North London's Muslims are concentrated in the boroughs of Haringey, Barnet, and Enfield, with older communities of Turkish Cypriots more recently being joined by Algerians, Somalis, and Iranians.

Early settlement of London's Arabic-speaking Muslims is in the Kensington & Chelsea, Notting Hill, Edgware Road with the initial settlement around North Kensington since spreading to Hammersmith & Fulham, Lambeth, Brent, and Ealing. These six boroughs contain the highest proportion of Arabs in the UK, the majority of whom are Muslim - the recent 2021 census put the figure between 3 and 8%. In recent years, refugees and migrants from countries such as Eritrea, Ethiopia, Sudan, Afghanistan, Algeria, Morocco, and Yemen have joined these various communities, in many cases setting up their own mosques, such as the Iqraa Foundation in Harlesden.

Indian and Pakistani Muslims have settled in significant numbers further west in Hounslow and Southall, but in a much smaller proportion to their Hindu and Sikh neighbours.

Muslims are a much smaller minority south of the river, although significant communities of west and east African Muslims have formed in Peckham, Camberwell and around Old Kent Road, including Nigerians, Ghanaians, Ivorians, and Somalis. As in earlier years, Muslims have often been met with hostility by the local white population. In the years since 9/11 and the invasion of Iraq, nativism has often targeted Muslims in particular, with anti-immigrant sentiments channelled through the lens of Islamophobia. In spite of this context, certain Muslims have been able to rise through the ranks of society, most notably the Mayor of London Sadiq Khan.

In 2013, it was reported there were 13,400 Muslim-owned businesses in London, creating more than 70,000 jobs and representing just over 33% of Small to Medium Enterprises in London.

== Notable mosques and other institutions ==
The mosque is first and foremost a place of prayer. There are estimated to be almost 2,000 mosques and Islamic prayer rooms in the UK, serving 4.1 million Muslims, or 6.3% of the UK population. About 1500 of those Mosques were located in London as of 2016. These mosques in the UK range from humble and small 'house mosques' in residential areas to larger, purpose-built mosques such as Regents Park Mosque in London (discussed below).

London's first mosque was opened by Hajie Mohamed Dollie in 1895, in Albert Street, modern Camden. Ron Geeves states this in his biography of Abdullah Quilliam. The mosque moved to Euston Road in 1899, where the present Wellcome Collection stands. Mohamed Dollie was of Scottish and Malay ancestry. Mohamed Dollie died in 1906 and is buried at the Willesden New Cemetery.

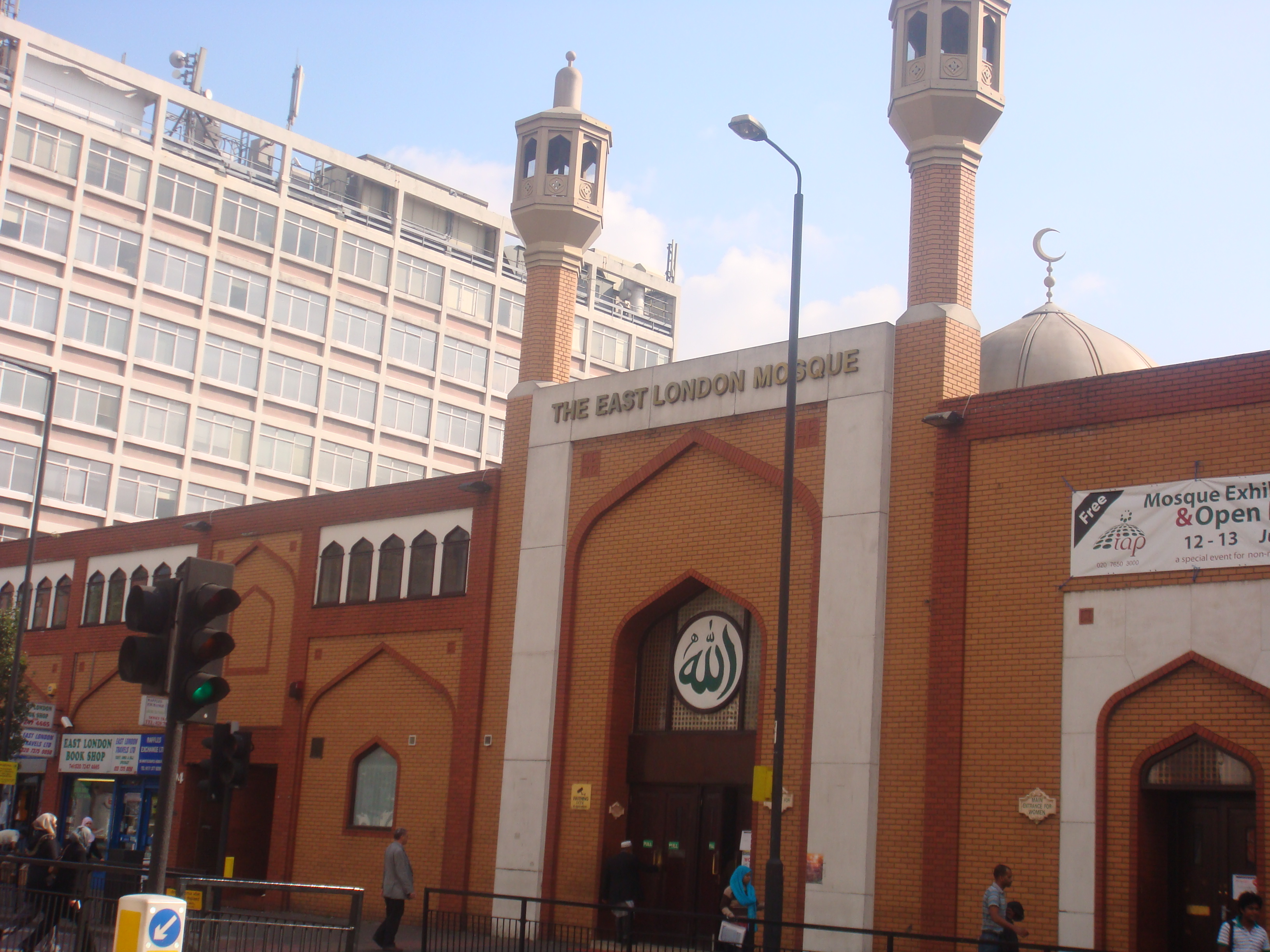
East London Mosque

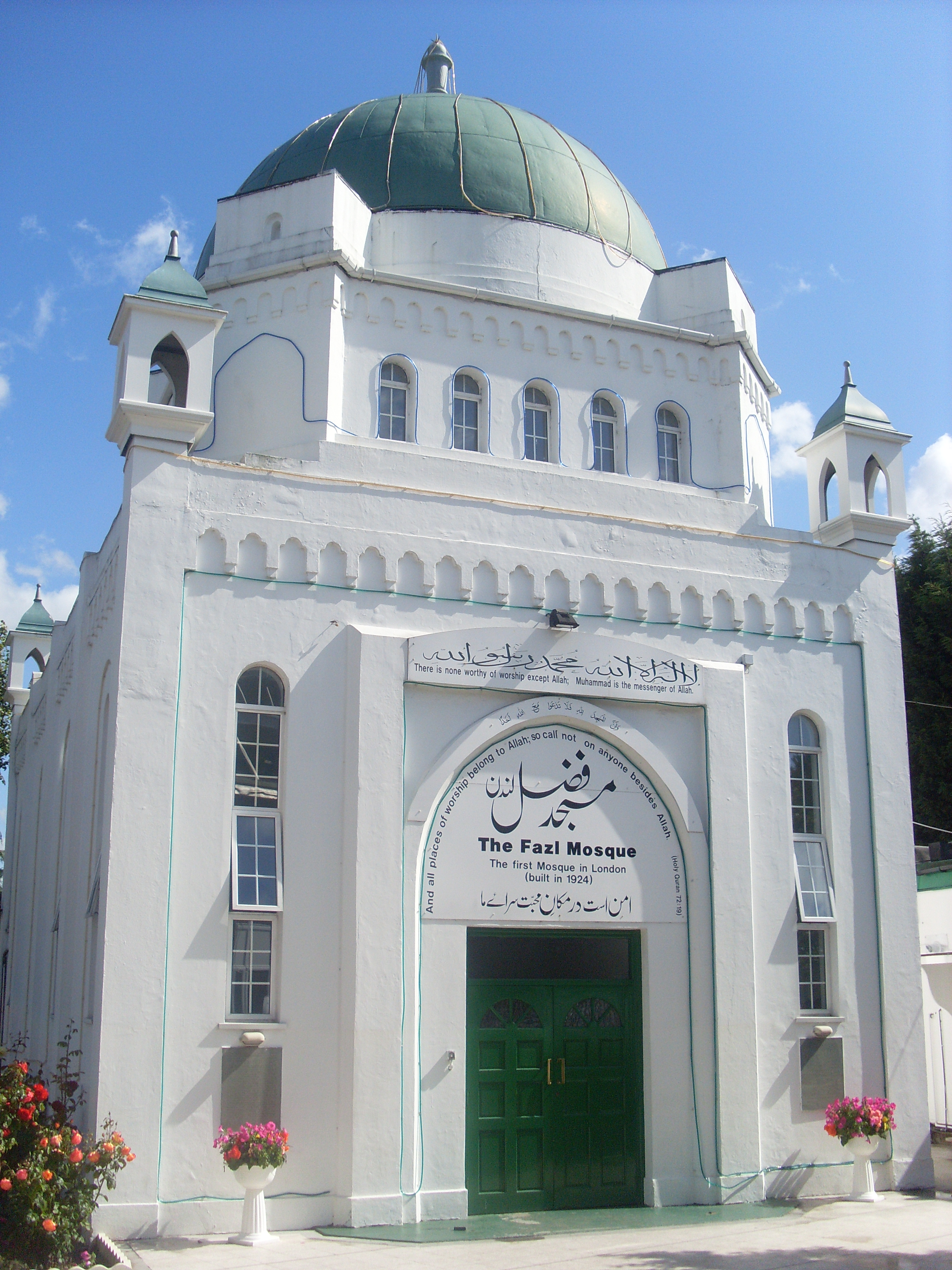
The Fazl Mosque in Southfields, the first purpose built mosque in London, inaugurated in 1926.

The Fazl Mosque was the first purpose-built mosque in London. It was founded in 1926 in Southfields, as a project of the Ahmadiyya community. Since 1984, the mosque and its surrounding buildings have been the residence of the Khalifatul Masih caliphs and therefore, the international headquarters of the Ahmadiyyas. However, the vast majority of Muslim scholars believe that the Ahmadiyya faith is outside of Islam.

One of the city's first large mosques opened in 1976 on Brick Lane, in a listed building which started life as a Huguenot church in the 18th century and was converted into a synagogue serving Ashkenazi Jews in the 19th. Soon afterwards, two large Sunni mosques were built, the East London Mosque (with the adjoining London Muslim Centre and Maryam Centre) on Whitechapel Road, and the London Central Mosque in Regent's Park.

Other mosques in Inner London include the Brixton Mosque, which serves a predominantly Caribbean community, and the Finsbury Park Mosque.

The Suleymaniye Mosque on Kingsland Road serves a largely Turkish community. Named after the famous landmark in Istanbul, it was purpose-built and opened in 1999. Shacklewell Lane Mosque was the first Turkish mosque in the United Kingdom. It was established by Turkish Cypriots in 1977 in a converted synagogue. The nearby Aziziye Mosque in Stoke Newington was converted from a cinema.

In Outer London are the Croydon Mosque, the very large Baitul Futuh Mosque in Merton, and the Abbey Mills Mosque in Stratford. Also notable are the Central Mosque Wembley, Leytonstone Mosque, and Harrow Central Mosque.

The Islamic Centre of England is a Shia mosque and educational establishment that opened in 1998. London is also home to The Islamic College, a college and university which offers A-levels, BA, and MA degrees in coordination with Middlesex University.

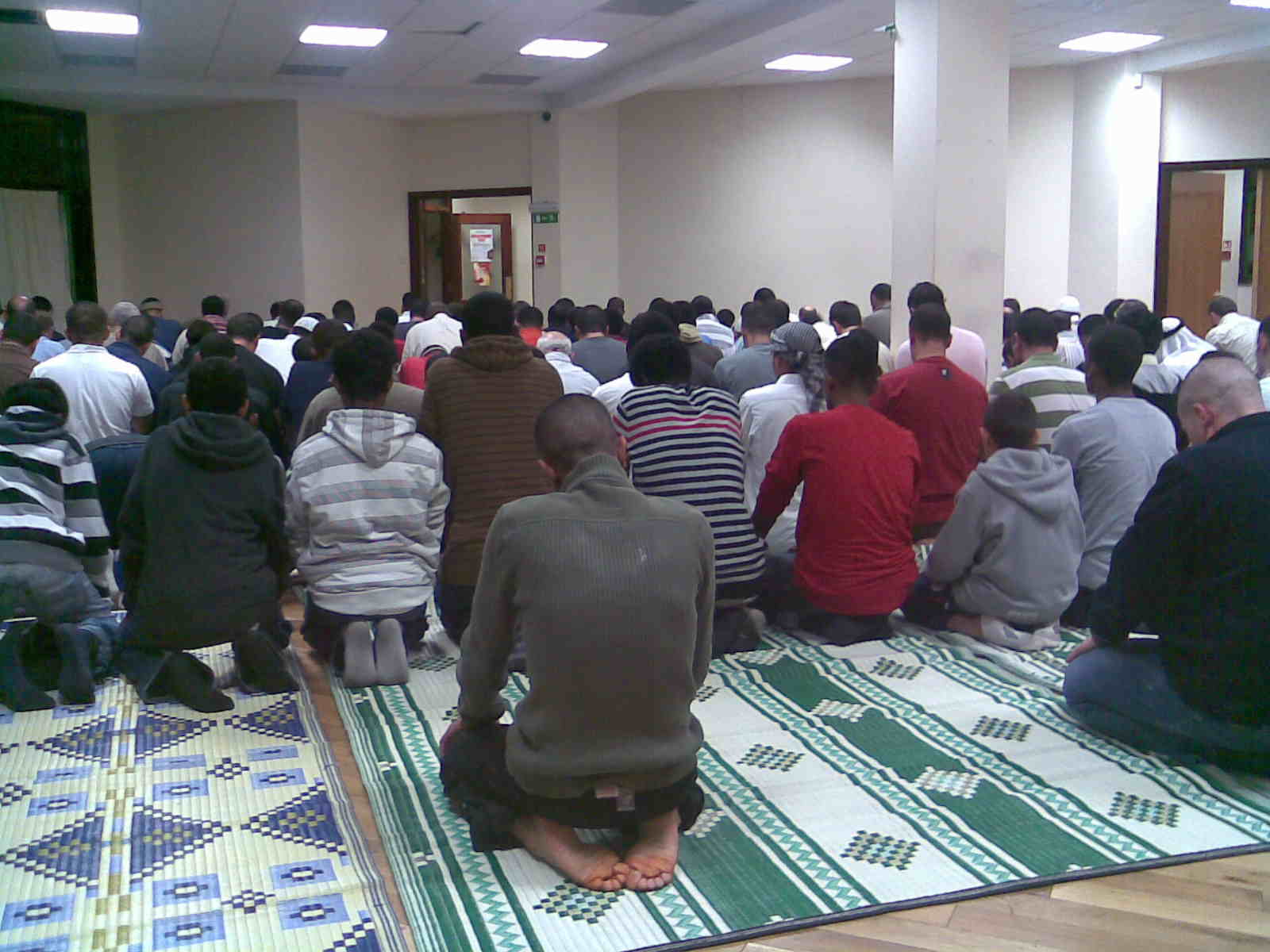
Prayers at the Finsbury Park Mosque for the Algerian community

== Hate against Muslims in London ==
Police forces recorded 110 hate crimes directed at Muslim places of worship (Mar.-Jul. 2019) This number is up from 47 over the same six-month period in 2016; attacks have doubled over past year. In 2019, a jury convicted a man of murder after he drove a van into Muslim worshipers outside a London mosque, killing one person and injuring nine others. Overall, the number of anti-Muslim hate crimes reported across Britain increased by 593% after the Christchurch mosque shootings. The British government has been making vast efforts to reduce these deadly attacks.

== See also ==
- List of British Muslims
- Londonistan
- Muslim patrol incidents in London
- Islam Expo
- Islam in Birmingham
- Islam in England
- Islam in the United Kingdom
- Muslim Welfare House
- Wembley's Conference of Living Religions 1924
- Religion in England
- Religion in London
