= Stroud Green =

Suburb of north London, England

Coordinates: 51.57653°N 0.10950°W

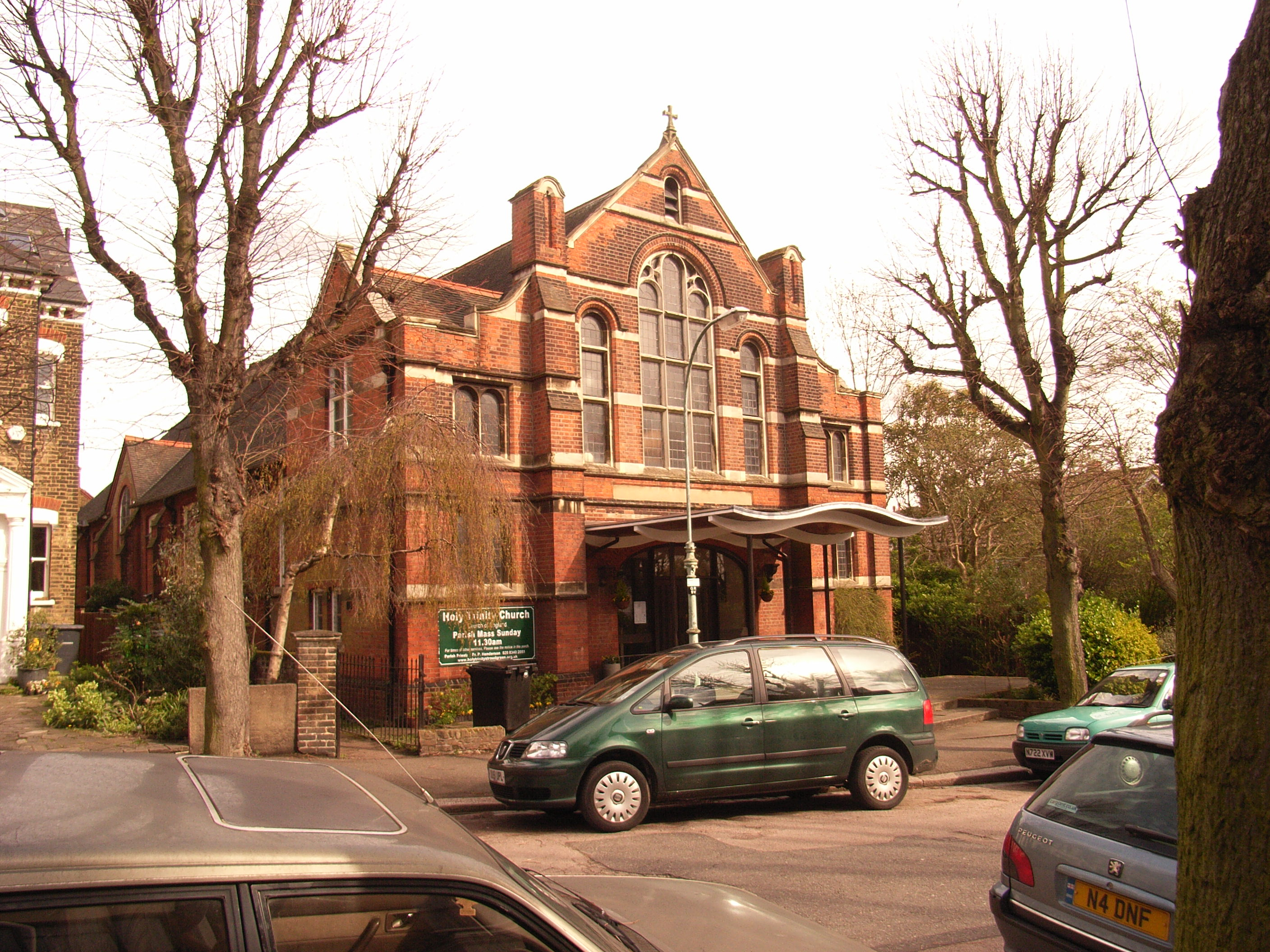
- Holy Trinity, Stroud Green

- Location within Greater London
- Population: 11,758 (2011 census.Ward)
- OS grid reference: TQ311881
- London borough: Haringey; Islington
- Ceremonial county: Greater London
- Region: London
- Country: England
- Sovereign state: United Kingdom
- Post town: LONDON
- Postcode district: N4
- Dialling code: 020
- Police: Metropolitan
- Fire: London
- Ambulance: London
- UK Parliament: Hornsey and Friern Barnet
- London Assembly: Enfield and Haringey; North East

Stroud Green is a suburb in north London, England, split between the London boroughs of Haringey and Islington. On its south-western side, Stroud Green Road '(the A1201) forms part of the boundary between the two boroughs.

Stroud Green Road (the A1201) is the main local hub and shopping area. At its eastern end it intersects Seven Sisters Road and Blackstock Road at a major crossroads. Stroud Green Road is a populous thoroughfare linking Crouch Hill with the major north London transport interchange of Finsbury Park station.

== History ==
=== Toponymy ===
In 1407, the area was called Strode, which is formed from the Old English 'stōd' and means 'marshy ground covered with brushwood'. It is recorded as Stowde Grene in 1546, the 'grene' suffix is Middle English and means 'village green'.

== Locale ==
=== Stroud Green Road ===
The neighbourhood high street, Stroud Green Road (the A1201), includes a wide range of restaurants and other mainly independent shops. There are also two high-street supermarkets.

The Finsbury Park end of the road, though different in character to the stretch further north, is currently benefitting from a large regeneration scheme centred on Finsbury Park town centre.

The folk record label Topic Records was based at 48–50 Stroud Green Road and many folk LPs were recorded there. The label has since moved to Uppingham in Rutland.

=== Library ===
In the east of the neighbourhood, next to Harringay railway station is the Stroud Green & Harringay Library.

== Transport ==
Stroud Green Road (the A1201) runs north west from the transport hub of Finsbury Park station, and stops just 150 yards south east of Crouch Hill railway station on the Gospel Oak to Barking line. On the eastern border of Stroud Green is Harringay railway station on the Great Northern Line. London bus routes 210, W3 and W7 run the length of Stroud Green Road, terminating at Finsbury Park. The low railway bridge at Finsbury Park prevents bus routes running directly from areas north of Finsbury Park such as Stroud Green Road directly into central London.

Stroud Green railway station closed in 1954. It was on the Finsbury Park to Edgware line, and along with nearby Crouch End railway station had been planned to be added to the Northern line of London Underground, but World War II intervened.

== Politics ==
Stroud Green is part of the Hornsey and Friern Barnet constituency for elections to the House of Commons.

Stroud Green is part of the Stroud Green electoral ward for elections to Haringey London Borough Council.
