= June 2017 London terror attacks =

June 2017 London terror attacks may refer to any of following separate events:

- The 2017 London Bridge attack on 3 June
- The 2017 Finsbury Park attack on 19 June
