= Abbey Mills Mosque =

Mosque in London, England

Masjid-e-Ilyas
- (Abbey Mills Mosque)
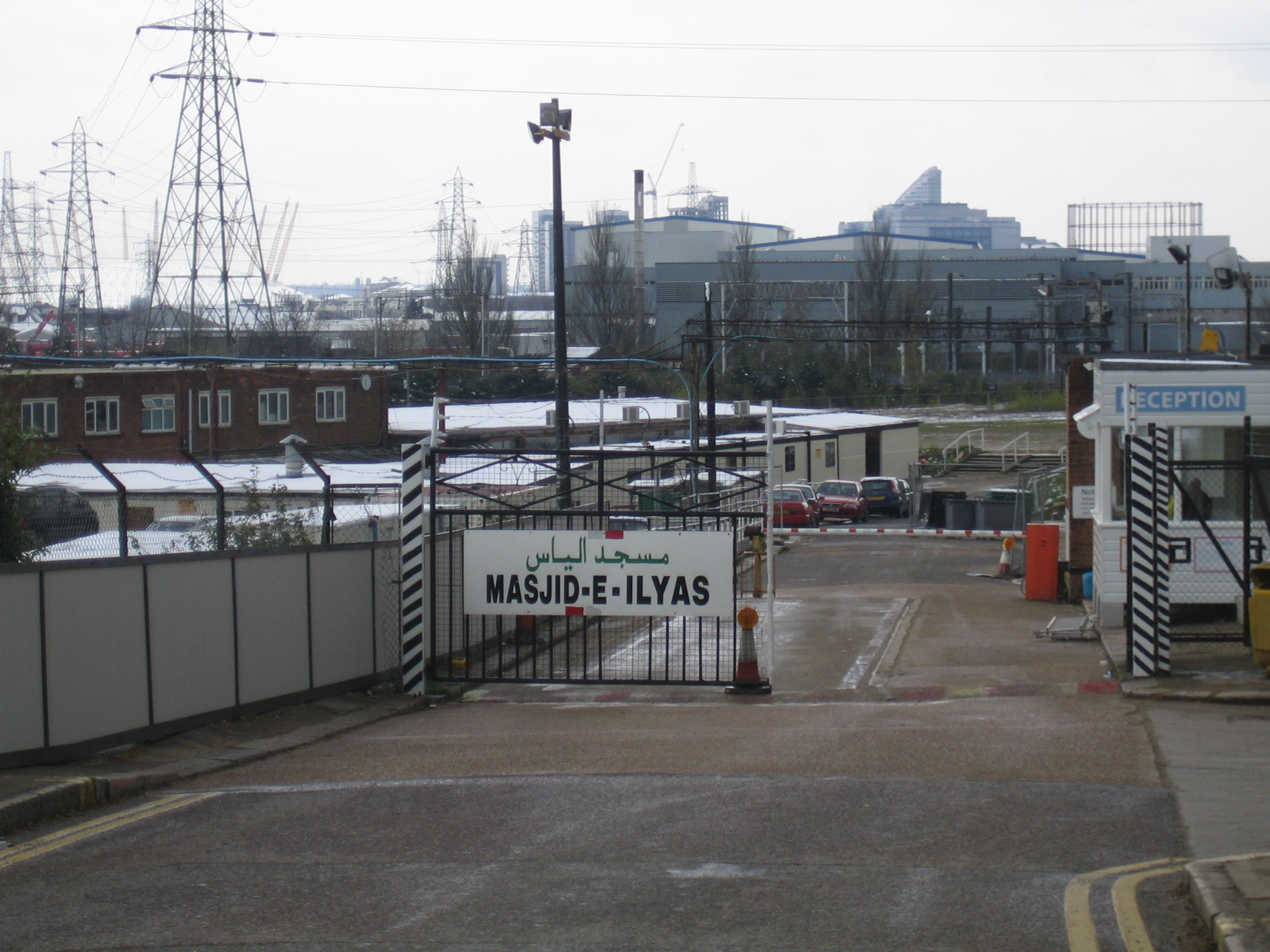
- Entrance to the mosque site

Religion
- Affiliation: Sunni Islam

Location
- Location: Stratford, London; United Kingdom
- Interactive map of Masjid-e-Ilyas
- Coordinates: 51.529°N 0.002°E

Architecture
- Architect: Allies and Morrison
- Type: Mosque
- Style: former industrial building
- Capacity: 2500

The Abbey Mills Mosque, also known as the London Markaz or Masjid-e-Ilyas (Arabic: مسجد إلياس), is a temporary mosque located in Stratford, east London, accommodating around 2,500 people. Plans were made to expand the capacity of the mosque to what would have been the largest religious building in Britain – three times the size of St Paul's Cathedral – and one of the largest mosques in western Europe. For this reason the proposed building is often informally referred to in the press as the "mega-mosque". The mosque extension was to have been built by Tablighi Jamaat, near the site of the London 2012 Olympic Park. Anjuman-e-Islahul Muslimeen, Tablighi Jamaat's charitable trust, has been the owner of the site since 1996. The Tablighi Jamaat website devoted to the mosque places the maximum capacity at 12,000 worshippers.

The plan sparked controversy for various reasons, including its initially reported size and the possible chemical contamination risk associated with the site. Mosque officials are engaged in resolving the controversies, as well as countering the perception implied by the term "mega-mosque". Public response to the mosque and associated controversies has included online petitions, various public talks, debates, speeches and various demonstrations.

In February 2010, Newham Council tried to shut down the existing temporary facility. This was overturned on appeal and a two-year extension granted for the use of the site. In 2012, Newham Council refused permission for the plans and following appeals in 2015 and 2018 is looking to demolish the site so it can be developed for residential and commercial purposes.

== Project ==
In 1996 Anjuman-e-Islahul Muslimeen purchased the Abbey Mills site (the location of a former chemical works) for £1.6 million. In 2001, the Tablighi Jamaat was issued a five-year permit to use the site as a place of worship; however, the permit expired before building commenced. In 2007 the site plan incorporated a mosque capable of accommodating 12,000 people, a visitor and conference centre, substantial parking for cars and facilities for bicycles, a new entrance to the West Ham Underground station, a residential school for 500 pupils, a reception centre for visiting VIPs—including about 20 guest suites, a plan for the retention of the natural habitat on the island location within the site, and extensive landscaping. The Tablighi Jamaat also stated that they plan to develop the mosque to make full use of natural resources, reducing the mosque's energy consumption and increasing the mosque's recycling.

With the expiration of the permit to use the site, and neither a current plan permission nor application for a mosque, the building's future appeared uncertain. In February 2010, Newham Council tried to shut down the existing temporary facility by serving an enforcement notice on the owners. However, this was overturned on appeal and a two-year extension granted for the use of the site. In 2012, Newham Council refused permission for the plans. Tablighi Jamaat appealed against this decision, but the appeal was dismissed by the UK Government in October 2015.

Tablighi Jamaat then started using the site as a temporary mosque, capable of accommodating 2,500 people, while they sought to overturn a demolition order. In February 2018 the demolition order was upheld and Anjuman-e-Islahul Muslimeen was ordered to pay reparations of over £22,000 to the council. The Newham council hopes to develop the site for housing and businesses.

== Concerns ==
=== Size ===
Reports as to the size of the mosque have varied considerably. Ali Mangera of Mangera Yvars Architects, submitted a proposal for the design competition, stated that his design would accommodate up to 40,000 visitors simultaneously, with the potential for expanding to contain 70,000 people. These figures led to much consternation. London Borough of Newham Councillor Alan Craig, of the Christian Peoples Alliance, criticised the development plans on the grounds that they would change the character of the local area, making it predominantly Muslim, and has called for a public inquiry into the mosque's development. The Daily Telegraph reported that the Newham planning department would refuse the mosque's application, as a project of that size had the potential to cause damage to community relations in the area.

In response to the public concern about the mosque's size, the mosque's trustees did not choose Mangera's design for the final plan, deciding instead on a scaled-down structure. Abdul Sattar Shahid, speaking on behalf of the Tablighi Jamaat trustees, announced that the firm of Allies and Morrison was retained to design the mosque. In November 2011, it was reported that Allies & Morrison had been replaced by NRAP Architects. An outline planning application was submitted in May 2012. The scheme prepared by NRAP Architects included a prayer hall for over 9000, a refectory for 2000 and an Islamic library set within a public garden. A needs analysis and viability assessment submitted with the planning application sought to demonstrate that the proposals represent a justifiable departure from planning policy.

=== Environment ===
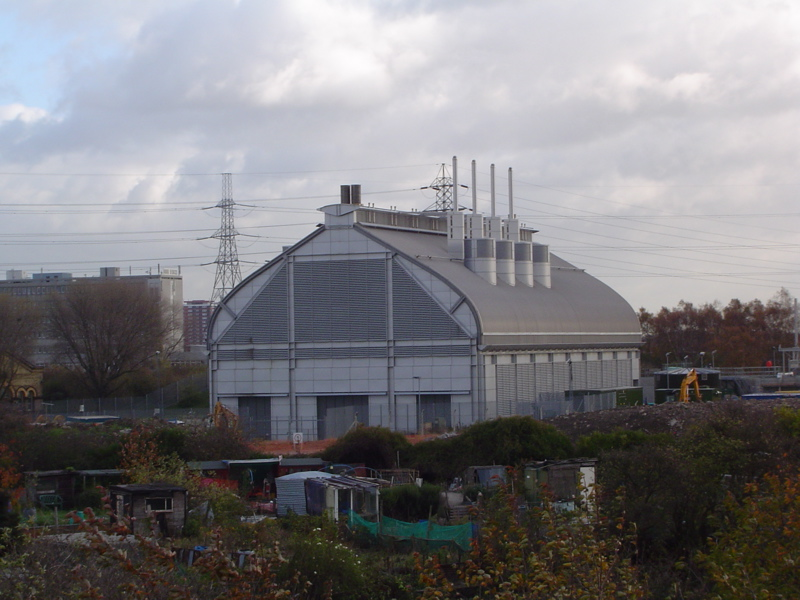
The new Abbey Mills pumping station, which is adjacent to the proposed site of the Mosque

In July 2007, a report by Waterman Environmental was publicised by Councillor Craig, which revealed that the land upon which the Abbey Mills Mosque would be built is considered to have a medium-to-high contamination risk. The site was used as a chemical works for at least 100 years, and was decommissioned as such in the late 1980s. Craig claimed that he obtained this information under the Freedom of Information Act 2000, and called for the Environment Agency to be brought in and for the site to be shut down until an independent report was undertaken. According to Craig, the Waterman Report revealed that the original pre-remediation works had discovered soil and groundwater impact by mercury, lead, arsenic, oil, fuels, and asbestos fibres. There were methane and carbon dioxide land gas readings as well. Mosque officials have stated that allowing the development to proceed would benefit the community, as decontamination of the site is part of their building plan.

=== Funding ===
In September 2006, The Guardian reported on concerns regarding funding for the Tablighi Jamaat's construction project. Documentation filed with the Charity Commission indicated that Anjuman-E-Islahul Muslimeen's annual donations were in the order of only £500,000, suggesting the need for significant extra financial support to fund the building project. It was suggested that the project would be funded by Saudi Islamist groups. This was thought to be based on Tablighi Jamaat's supposed close links with the form of the religion practised by the Saudi royal family.

The Tablighi Jamaat website lists that it intends to raise the money predominantly via small donations from Muslims in the London area, that they have no links, nor made contact with, the Saudi royal family, and clearly states that the Tablighi Jamaat are neither actively seeking overseas money nor public money.

=== Terrorism ===
In July 2003 The New York Times quoted Michael J. Heimbach, a deputy chief of the Federal Bureau of Investigation's international terrorism section, saying that the FBI has found that the same group of militants were involved in recruiting for Al-Qaeda. The group has also been targeted to as "a key influence on terrorists targeting Britain" and "a common link to a string of attacks and conspiracies".

The Tablighi Jamaat website states that it refrains from political or controversial activities and stands for democracy and freedom. The group describes itself as a non-political group and categorically rejects any links to terrorism or terrorists. Its website makes clear that it cannot take responsibility for the actions of every individual who has ever attended their mosques or services.

Yoginder Sikand, who studied and wrote about the Tablighi Jamaat in South Asia, said that any fringe elements do not reflect the peacefulness of the movement. Although the group has a very loose organisational structure, Sikand says that it would be "simply wrong to describe Tablighi Jamaat as a terrorist recruiting organisation".

== Responses ==
=== Petition ===
An online petition was formed in response to the concerns raised about the planned mosque, calling on the Prime Minister, Gordon Brown to prevent the building of the mosque; the petition closed with over 250,000 signatures and was at the time the most signed petition on the site. Her Majesty's Government responded that the local planning authorities are responsible for general control of development in their areas and are required to take into consideration the views of interested persons and particularly local communities. In regard to this specific proposal, the government was informed by the Newham London Borough Council that there is neither a current planning permission or application for a mosque, nor is one expected in the near future. In September 2012, a planning application was submitted to Newham Council and is under consideration by them.

Ken Livingstone, the then Mayor of London, issued a statement protesting against what he called "the particularly vicious nature of the campaign against a possible Muslim place of worship in East London", stating that it should be "condemned by all of those who support the long established right of freedom of religion in this country, and all the more so as it is based on information which has long been established to be factually untrue."

=== Public relations ===
In 2007 the Tablighi Jamaat retained the public relations firm Indigo Public Affairs, which specialises in difficult major planning situations. The firm's efforts to enhance the organisation's image include setting up a website for the mosque and creating YouTube videos discussing the various concerns.

In September 2007 a public discussion between supporters and opponents of the mosque plan was held at Ithaca House in Stratford. Issues discussed included the legitimacy of the concerns about the mosque, the extent of the conservative view of Islam taught by Tablighi Jamaat, their unwillingness to engage in public discourse, the extent that racism plays a role in the mosque's opposition, and the demand for larger facilities in the West Ham area to support the needs of the community.

=== Threats ===
In apparent response to the opposition to the mosque, Alan Craig has been the subject of a video showing his purported obituary, together with that of his wife and two children. The video was posted by a 23-year-old man from Stevenage named Muhammad, better known by his online moniker of "Abdullah1425". Nick Kilby, speaking on behalf of Tablighi Jamaat, said: "We found out about the video last night and it has been removed. We don't take responsibility for other people's sites that we don't control." He added that if Abdullah1425 was found to be a member of the organisation, it would be dealt with very seriously.

=== Other opposition ===
In March 2008 Ghayasuddin Siddiqui, co-founder of the Muslim Parliament of Great Britain, publicly opposed the construction of the mosque, stating that "We have too many mosques. I think it should not be built. What we need first is more integration between the existing mosques and the wider community." Siddiqui's opposition joins that of Craig, together with that of Irfan Al-Alawi, the director of the Center for Islamic Pluralism Europe, who expressed extreme concern about the spread of Tablighi Jamaat. Both Siddiqui and Al-Alawi have different and opposed Islamic viewpoints to that of the Tablighi.

== See also ==
- Islam in London
- Islam in the United Kingdom
- Islamic terrorism
- Islamic schools and branches
- Islamism
- Islamism in London
- List of mosques
- List of mosques in the United Kingdom
- Londonistan
- Park51 – A proposal to build an Islamic community center in New York, near the World Trade Center site where the 11 September attacks took place.
