= 2017 Finsbury Park van attack =

Terror attack in London, England

- 2017 Finsbury Park van attack (London Borough of Islington) 2017 Finsbury Park van attack (Greater London) 2017 Finsbury Park van attack (the United Kingdom)
- Location: 51.5630°N 0.1083°W; Finsbury Park, London, England, United Kingdom
- Date: 19 June 2017; 9 years ago 00:15 (BST)
- Target: Muslims
- Attack type: Vehicle-ramming attack
- Weapon: Luton box van with tail lift
- Deaths: 1
- Injuries: 11
- Perpetrator: Darren Osborne
- Motive: Islamophobia; White supremacy; Anti-immigration

On 19 June 2017, an Islamophobic terrorist attack occurred in Finsbury Park, London, England, when a van was intentionally driven into a crowd of Muslim pedestrians near the Muslim Welfare House, 100 yards (90 m) from the Finsbury Park Mosque, resulting in the death of a man and 11 injuries. The attack was found to be motivated by Islamophobia.

Makram Ali, a man who had earlier collapsed and was receiving first aid, died at the scene. The incident was investigated by counter-terrorism police as a terrorist attack. On 23 June, the perpetrator, a 47-year-old man from Cardiff, Wales named Darren Osborne, was charged with terrorism-related murder and attempted murder. In February 2018 at Woolwich Crown Court, he was found guilty on both counts and was sentenced to life imprisonment with a minimum term of 43 years.

== Background ==
Three attacks, described by the Prime Minister, Theresa May as "...bound together by the single, evil ideology of Islamist extremism", had occurred in the UK since March 2017: at Westminster on 22 March, in Manchester on 22 May, and at London Bridge on 3 June. Following these, there were increased reports of revenge attacks against Muslims, and mosques had been targeted as a response to recent Islamist attacks.

The Finsbury Park Mosque has previously attracted negative media attention. The radical cleric Abu Hamza al-Masri, who was convicted for terrorism-related charges in both the UK and the United States, served as its imam from 1997 to 2003. The mosque was shut down in 2003. In 2005, it re-opened under a new management team. Since then, it has actively promoted better interfaith community relations. In December 2015, a man holding a can of petrol attempted to ignite it and throw it into the building.

== Attack ==
On 19 June 2017, at approximately 00:15 BST (UTC+1), a hired van rammed several pedestrians at the junction of Whadcoat Street and Seven Sisters Road, near the Muslim Welfare House, 100 yards (90 m) from Finsbury Park Mosque in London.

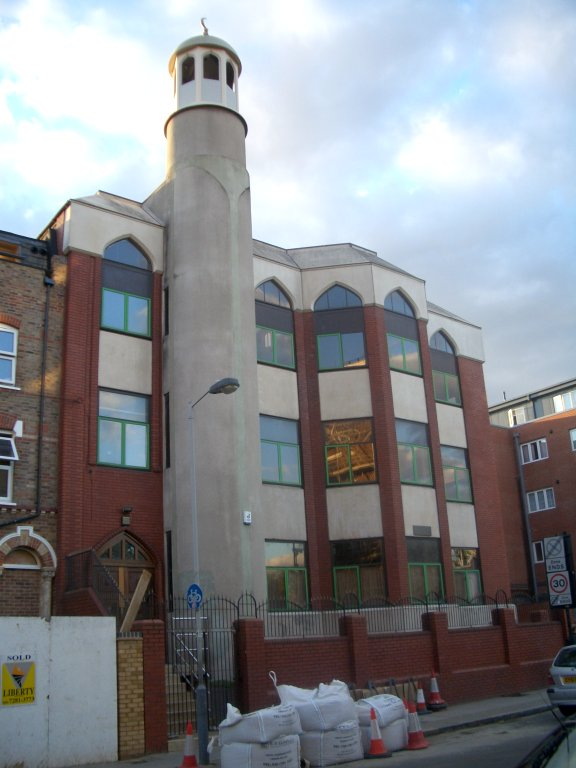
The Finsbury Park Mosque near the site of the attack

A group of Muslims had earlier performed tarawih, night time prayers held in the month of Ramadan, when they came across a collapsed man at a bus stop. While rendering first aid they were rammed, and ten were injured. The collapsed man, Makram Ali, died at the scene, and post-mortem findings indicated that he died of multiple injuries. Eleven people were injured.

Witnesses said the driver was beaten until the imam of the mosque, Mohammed Mahmoud, calmed down the crowd, prevented them from assaulting the perpetrator, and appealed for the driver to be handed over to police. Those beating him were held back by the imam and a few other men, and the attacker was pinned down at the scene until police arrived. Witnesses quoted the driver as saying "I want to kill all Muslims", "this is for London Bridge", "I did my bit", "you deserve it" and "kill me". The imam was described by the mosque's chief executive as "the hero of the day", and praised by Mayor of London Sadiq Khan.

Officers were called at 00:20 BST, the Metropolitan Police said, describing it as a major incident. London Ambulance Service said eight people were taken to local hospitals and two others were treated at the scene. The suspect was taken into custody shortly after the incident.

== Perpetrator ==
Darren Osborne (born 1969), of Cardiff, Wales, perpetrated the attack. Osborne, a father of four, was 47 at the time of the attack. He was born in Singapore and grew up in Weston-super-Mare, where he attended Broadoak Mathematics and Computing College. Security Minister Ben Wallace said he was not known to the security services prior to the attack. Osborne's neighbours in Pentwyn, where he had lived for several years, described him as aggressive and strange but claimed he was not a racist. Neighbours described him as a family man, who was heard singing with his children in the kitchen just hours before the attack, while others believed he and his partner had separated, living in a tent in woodland in recent months, and he was often seen shouting at her in the street.

Osborne's sister said he had attempted to commit suicide a few weeks prior to the attack, and that he had asked after the attempt to be committed in a psychiatric hospital but was declined by authorities. She further said he was taking anti-depressant medication. He had issues with drug and alcohol abuse, and had been unemployed for ten years. He had prior convictions for violence, including a two-year prison term. He was also convicted of burglary, property crimes and possession of drugs.

Sarah Andrews, Osborne's estranged partner, told detectives that he showed no signs of racism or extremism until three weeks before the attack. According to her, he had been angered by Three Girls, a BBC docudrama about the Rochdale child sex abuse ring, and he began to accuse all Muslims of being rapists. He radicalised within a month, influenced by far-right anti-Muslim material he accessed.

Osborne turned against Muslims in the wake of the London Bridge attack on 3 June 2017. He is reported to have hired a van in the vicinity of Cardiff, several days before the attack and slept in it during the night. On the eve of the attack he drove to London, three hours driving distance, prior to carrying out the attack. Witnesses from a Cardiff pub said he had announced the day before the attack his intention to attack the Al-Quds day march which was held earlier on the day of the attack. Osborne testified in court that he expected Labour Party leader Jeremy Corbyn and London Mayor Sadiq Khan to attend the march, and hoped to kill both. The Crown Prosecution Service said the comments on a note left in Osborne's van "displayed Osborne's resentment towards senior politicians, public figures and Muslims in general".

== Reactions ==
The reactions to the attack included responses by political and religious leaders, media and the general public from other nations, (Note: Including Algeria, Australia, Bahrain, Bulgaria, Canada, Egypt, Germany, France, Ireland, Jordan, Malaysia, the Netherlands, the Philippines, Singapore, Saudi Arabia, Sudan, the Bahamas, the United Arab Emirates, and the United States.) as well as international organisations. (Note: Including the Arab League, the European Union, the Organisation of Islamic Cooperation, NATO, and the United Nations.)

Flowers and messages were left close to the scene of the attack and a candlelight vigil was held at 8 pm on 19 June. Flags were flown at half mast in Jersey on 19 June as a mark of respect for people caught up in the Finsbury Park attack. The Penshaw Monument and the Magistrates' Court building in Keel Square in Sunderland was lit up in red, white and blue as a mark of respect following the incident, the Union Flag was also flying at half mast at Sunderland Civic Centre and Burnley Town Hall.

Mohammed Kozbar, the Chairman of the Finsbury Park Mosque, expressed condolences and condemnation of the attack via Twitter. Following the attack, Kozbar stated that the mosque had received multiple death threats. The attack was condemned by Christian, Sikh, and Jewish leaders. Representatives of the Muslim Council of Britain and the Ramadhan Foundation, as well as several local Labour politicians claimed the incident represented rising Islamophobia in the United Kingdom.

The incident was described by Sadiq Khan, the Mayor of London, as a terrorist attack. During a visit to the Finsbury Park mosque, the Prime Minister, Theresa May praised London's multicultural community and promised more security for places of worship and an increase in the efforts against extremism, including Islamophobia. Leader of the Opposition Jeremy Corbyn, whose constituency includes Finsbury Park, said he was shocked and that his thoughts were with those and the community affected by the event. May and Corbyn both visited the Finsbury Park mosque and community leaders on 19 June.

Prince Charles visited Finsbury Park Mosque on 21 June, where he met community leaders and conveyed a message from Queen Elizabeth II. He relayed that she was shocked by the attack, especially considering that the victims had been attending Ramadan prayers.

== Investigation and proceedings ==
=== Arrest ===
The Metropolitan Police said a 47-year-old male, believed to be the van driver, was detained by members of the public and arrested in connection to the incident, it happened in the early hours of the 17th of June 2017. Witnesses reported seeing three people leave the van involved in the incident, but police later announced that they had only one suspect. Osborne later claimed that an accomplice had been "getting the drinks in" at the time. The incident was investigated by counter-terrorism police.

A police spokesperson said the driver would be subject to a mental health evaluation. The van involved in the incident was reported to have been hired in Pontyclun, Wales. Secretary of State for Wales Alun Cairns said South Wales Police worked with officers from London on the investigation. Extra policing resources were deployed to reassure Muslim communities in the aftermath.

=== Charges ===
The Prime Minister, Theresa May said in a statement that police had declared the attack a terrorist incident within eight minutes. Cressida Dick, Commissioner of the Metropolitan Police, confirmed that the attack was being treated as terrorism. The suspect was initially charged with attempted murder, but was later charged for "the commission, preparation or instigation of terrorism" including murder and attempted murder.

=== Role of Tommy Robinson ===
It was revealed in court that the perpetrator received emails from far-right activist Tommy Robinson and read Robinson's tweets in the lead-up to the attack. Robinson's tweet mocking people for responding to terrorism with the phrase "don't look back in anger" was found in the note at the scene of the attack (A reference to the song by Manchester band Oasis that was sung at a memorial for the victims of the terrorist attack several weeks earlier). An email from Robinson's account to the attacker Darren Osborne shortly before read, "Dear Darren, you know about the terrible crimes committed against [name redacted] of Sunderland. Police let the suspects go... why? It is because the suspects are refugees from Syria and Iraq. It's a national outrage..." Another email read, "There is a nation within a nation forming just beneath the surface of the UK. It is a nation built on hatred, on violence and on Islam."

Commander Dean Haydon of Scotland Yard's counter-terrorism command said that online material from Robinson had played a "significant role" in how Osborne was radicalised and "brainwashed".

Mark Rowley, the outgoing Assistant Commissioner of the Metropolitan Police and the UK's most senior counter-terror officer said that there is "no doubt" that material posted online by people including Robinson drove the Finsbury Park terror attacker to targeting Muslims. In response, Robinson said: "I'm gonna find Mark Rowley."

=== Conviction and sentence ===
On 21 December 2017, Darren Osborne pleaded guilty to charges of terrorism-related murder and attempted murder. The trial was held in January 2018 at Woolwich Crown Court and on 1 February, Osborne was found guilty on both counts. He was sentenced to life imprisonment with a minimum tariff of 43 years with simultaneous terms for murder and attempted murder. Osborne would not be eligible for parole for 43 years.

== Aftermath ==
Detective Superintendents Mark Gower and Claire Summers received OBEs for their services to the police response to and investigation of terrorist incidents including the Finsbury Park attack as part of the 2019 New Year Honours, as did Imam Mohammed Mahmoud.

On the five-year anniversary of the crime, Prime Minister Boris Johnson tweeted his condolences to the family of the victims and those affected. Sadiq Khan stated his thoughts were with the families, and that "That senseless attack five years ago was an assault on our shared values of openness, freedom and respect. [...] the solidarity shown by all communities in our city in the wake of the attack showed that we will never let terrorists win by dividing us."

According to the Metropolitan Police, anti-Muslim crimes had fallen in the years since the attack, but another organisation, speaking to BBC News, criticized these numbers, saying many incidents had not been reported. According to their numbers, anti-Muslim hate crimes increased 45% in the years since. Many London mosques increased their security in the aftermath of the attacks.

In 2022, on the five-year anniversary of the crime, the mosque chairman stated that Islamophobia was now "much worse", and criticized the government and some media for the "institutionalisation" of anti-Muslim sentiment. Finsbury Park Mosque has dealt with later Islamophobic incidents, including a pig's head being left at the entrance.

== See also ==
- List of terrorist incidents in London
