= Muslim patrol incidents in London =

2013–2014 incidents in the United Kingdom

A group of vigilantes calling themselves "Muslim patrols" patrolled the streets in East London from 2013 to 2014. The individuals were young Sunni Muslim men, members of an organisation that called itself the "Shariah Project". Early in 2013, videos of their activities, filmed by members of the patrol, were uploaded online: these showed hooded members confronting passers-by and demanding that they behave in an Islamic way. They targeted prostitutes, people drinking alcohol, couples who were holding hands, women whom they considered to be dressed immodestly, and harassed others whom they perceived as being gay. Five men were arrested in January 2013 as part of an investigation into the gang. In December 2013, three of them pleaded guilty to affray, and were subsequently jailed.

The Muslim East London Mosque community condemned the patrols as "utterly unacceptable". In response to the attacks, British nationalist organisation Britain First established "Christian Patrols".

== Online videos ==
One video uploaded to YouTube by the gang, "The Truth About Saturday Night", was viewed more than 42,000 times. In it, the gang confronted people, shouting "this is a Muslim area" at them. The hooded men are seen forcing people to empty their alcoholic drinks down drains, and instructing a group of women that "they need to forbid themselves from dressing like this and exposing themselves outside the mosque".

A second video, beginning with a logo saying "Islam will take over the world", showed the gang shouting homophobic abuse at a man walking in Whitechapel. The gang shouted at a man who appeared to be wearing make-up that he is "in a Muslim area dressed like a fag" and must leave. One gang member orders the man: "Get out of here quicker. You're dirty mate." After the victim says that he is a homosexual, he is repeatedly prompted to say that he is "dirty".

Their last video featured the gang saying: "We are coming to implement Islam upon your own necks. Muslim patrols can never be stopped."

The videos were removed from YouTube in January 2013 because they contravened the site’s policies on harassment, bullying and threatening behaviour.

Scotland Yard investigated the videos and the Metropolitan Police stepped up patrols in East London. A police spokesman said they were in contact with "local community leaders and influential people, local businesses and the local authority about the issue and what is being done". Five men were later arrested.

== Condemnation ==
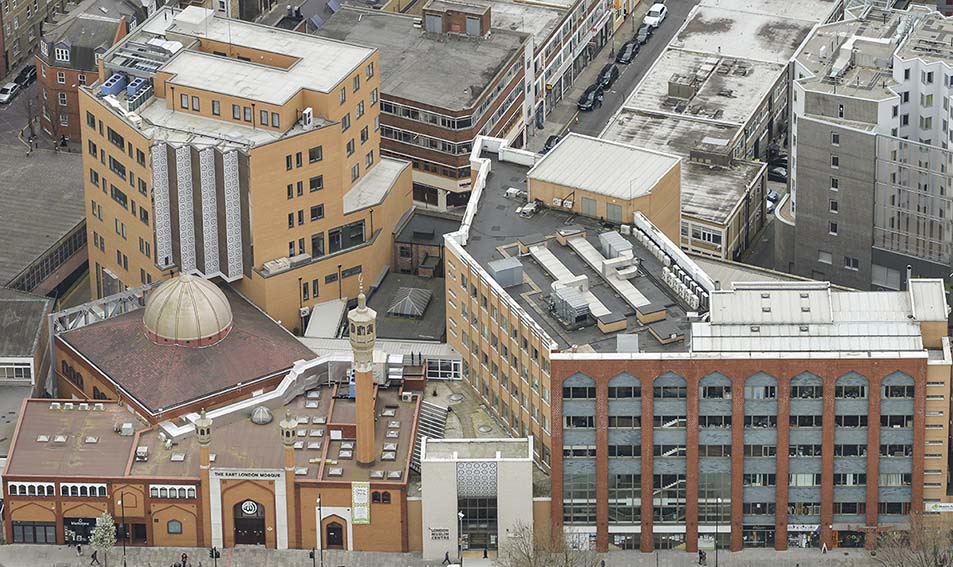
Whitechapel's East London Mosque condemned the patrols, deeming them divisive to the local community

The East London Mosque condemned the patrols as "utterly unacceptable and clearly designed to stoke tensions and sow discord." They said the mosque was "committed to building co-operation and harmony between all communities in this borough."

Gay rights group Stonewall said: "This incident is yet another reminder of the homophobic abuse that gay people face all too often."

== Origin of patrols ==
The arrested patrollers were members of The Shariah Project. The organisation's co-founder, Abu Rumaysah, told the press the arrested men would be welcomed back despite their convictions at the Central Criminal Court. An East London Mosque official, speaking of the patrols, identified The Shariah Project as "strongly linked" to Anjem Choudary's group Al-Muhajiroun. Several media reports have since identified the Sharia patrols as part of a network of followers of Anjem Choudary.

Choudary himself condoned the Sharia patrols. He spoke in public before several supporters known to take part in these patrols, including at meetings held early in 2014, and praised as "commendable" the actions of the convicted members of the Sharia patrol.

== Conviction and sentencing ==
The Central Criminal Court heard evidence concerning incidents involving the patrol which took place in Shoreditch, Bethnal Green, and in Whitechapel outside the East London Mosque where videos were made of members of the patrol harassing members of the public at night when the mosque was closed. The patrol targeted a heterosexual couple in Bethnal Green for holding hands, shouting at them to stop because they were in "a Muslim area." Just weeks later, the patrol picked on five friends who were drinking in the street because it was "Allah's land"; 19-year-old Islamic convert Jordan Horner threatened to stab the men, while one of the patrol members shouted "kill the non-believers".

Three of the patrol members were convicted in November, and were sentenced on 6 December 2013. Jordan Horner, who uses the Islamic name Jamaal Uddin, pleaded guilty to two charges of assault and two charges of using threatening words and behaviour, and was sentenced to 68 weeks imprisonment. Thirty-six-year-old Ricardo MacFarlane who pleaded not guilty, was sentenced to one year for affray and two years for using threatening words and behaviour. 23-year-old Royal Barnes, who was awaiting further trial regarding offensive videos about Lee Rigby and therefore could not be named at the time, pleaded guilty and received a six-month sentence for affray.

In February 2014 Horner, McFarlane and Barnes were given anti-social behaviour orders barring them from the activities that led to their conviction and from associating with Choudary.

== Responses ==
Maajid Nawaz, himself a Muslim and the head of an anti-extremist organisation, the Quilliam Foundation, warned that Muslim patrols could become a "lot more dangerous", and if joined by jihadis, might even kill or maim people. A writer for the International Business Times suggested that these "radical Muslim youths determined to impose their views of public conduct and morality" felt alienated from what they consider a "hostile and discriminatory outside society", and have turned to their faith to forge a separate identity.

In response to the "Muslim Patrols", the far-right organisation Britain First established "Christian Patrols" in East London. The Christian Patrols reportedly rode through the area in "armoured Land Rover vehicles" and handed out literature marked with a red Christian cross. A Christian leader Rev. Alan Green, as well as a Muslim leader Dilowar Khan, both condemned Christian and Muslim patrols.

== Documentaries on London patrols ==
In April 2014 two news documentaries were produced about the ongoing Sharia patrols: their respective presenters, Lama Hasan of ABC News and Alex Miller of Vice News, each accompanied a patrol in action. Alex Miller, reflecting on the difference between the evidence presented by the Youtube videos and what he observed of the patrol he followed around Ilford, commented: "this PR-friendly walk through the neighbourhood was pretty different from the country's first look at the Muslim patrols".

Interviewed by Alex Miller, Abu Rumaysah said: "We don't recognise British law at all. We believe in Islam. We believe in Sharia. And that's what sets our parameters for right and wrong."

== See also ==
- "Shariah Police" incidents in Wuppertal, Germany (2014)
- Islamic fundamentalism
- Mishmeret Tzniyut
- Moral police
- Islamic religious police
- Islam in London
- Londonistan
- Islamic Defenders Front
