= Wuppertal Sharia Police incident =

2014 incident in Germany

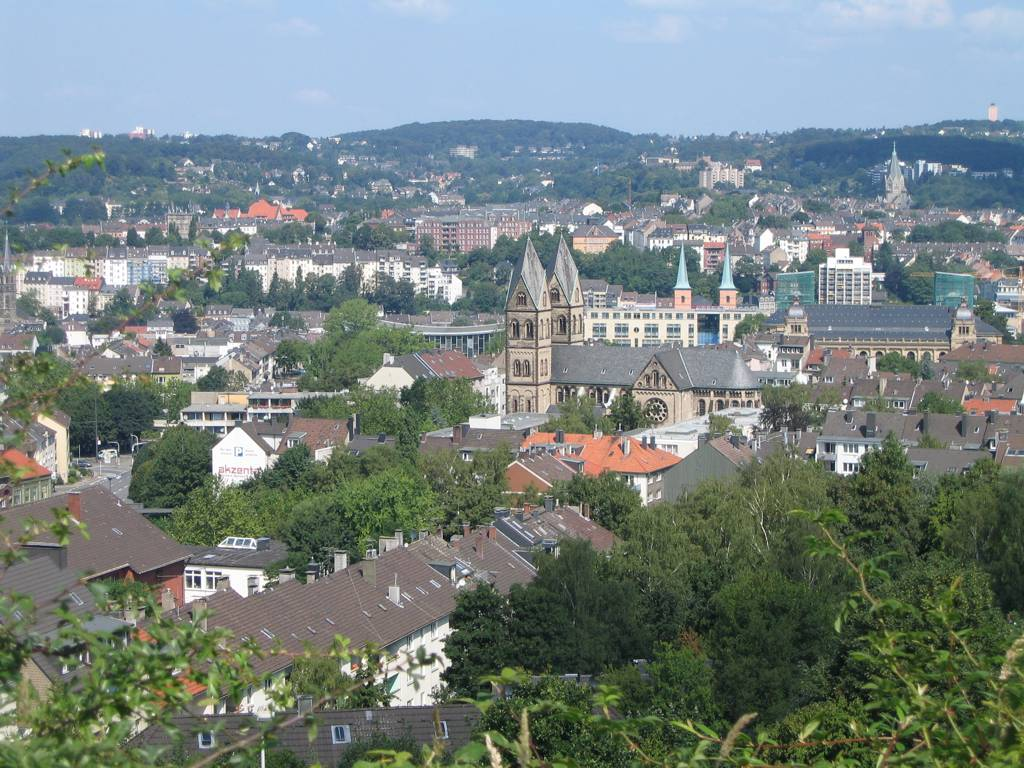
View of the German city of Wuppertal

Hardline Salafist Muslims patrolled the streets of Wuppertal, a city in the west of Germany, to "influence and recruit young people", according to local police. Dressed in bright orange reflective vests with "Shariah Police" printed on the back, the male patrollers loitered around discotheques and gambling houses, telling passers-by to refrain from gambling and alcohol. Wuppertal's police have pressed charges.

A German Salafist posted on YouTube a propaganda video showing a poster with the English headline "Shariah Controlled Zone", followed by images of Salafists recruiting young people and visiting gambling houses. Joerg Rademacher, spokesman for the interior ministry, said the video was "a new provocation and part of the Salafist propaganda, which shows that the scene does not acknowledge Germany's rule of law". Officials of North Rhein-Westphalia say there are about 1,800 Salafists in the state, of whom 10 percent are considered to be violent extremists. Justice Minister, Heiko Maas, told Bild that "the state alone" was responsible for the administration of justice in Germany, and any illegal parallel system of law enforcement would not be tolerated.

The 33-year-old behind the Wuppertal patrols, former fireman and one of the leaders of the German Salafist movement Sven Lau, published a video on his website, claiming that the men involved had simply worn mock uniforms for a few hours and that "Sharia police" never existed. "We knew that this would raise attention," Lau said, claiming that his goal was to spark a debate about Sharia law in Germany.

Eight of the men involved in the patrols were later prosecuted under a law that bans wearing uniforms to convey a common political conviction.

In November 2016, the court ruled that the actions of the "sharia police" was legal under Germany's free speech laws and that their orange vests were not "suggestively militant or intimidating" uniforms.

Later in 2020 the German Supreme Court (Bundesgerichtshof) overruled that decision and ruled that wearing the sharia uniforms was a violation of German law ( § 3 Abs. 1, § 28 VersammlG) and sentenced the participants accordingly.

== See also ==
- "Muslim patrols" in London (2013-2014)
- Islamic fundamentalism
- Islam in Germany
- Moral police
- Islamic religious police
- Islamic Defenders Front
