= N4 Library =

Public library in Islington, England

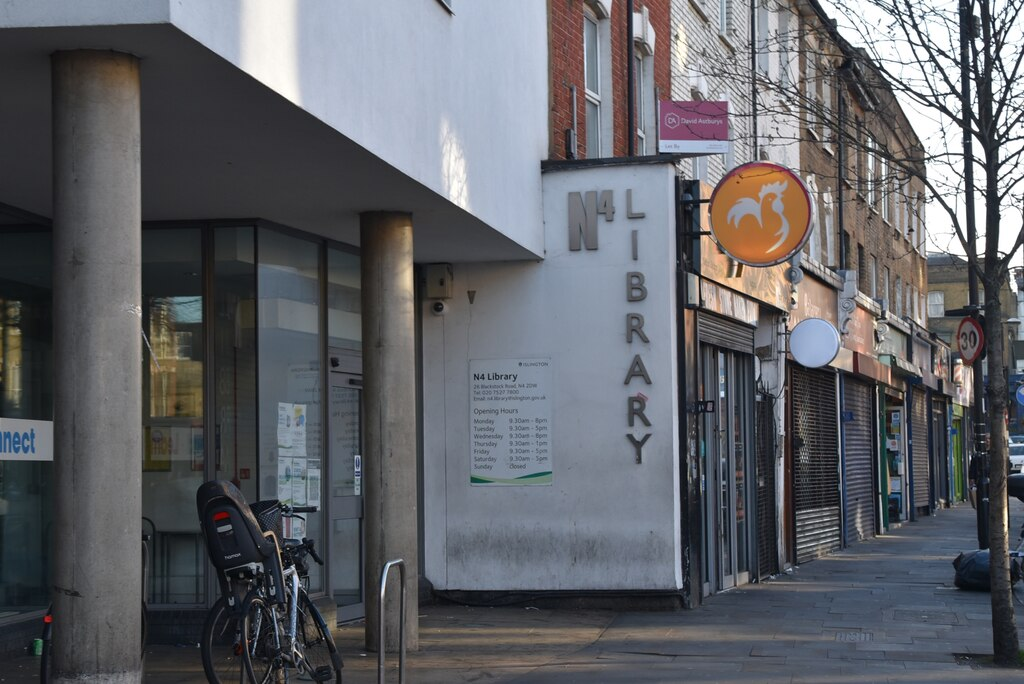
- The library in 2022
- 51.56465°N 0.10362°W
- Location: Blackstock Road; London, United Kingdom
- Type: Public library
- Established: 2004
- Branch of: Islington Libraries

Collection
- Size: 21,477

Access and use
- Circulation: 59,163 (2024/25)

Other information
- Director: Nick Tranmer
- Public transit access: Finsbury Park
- Website: https://www.islington.gov.uk/libraries-arts-and-heritage/libraries/your-local-libraries/n4-library

The N4 Library is a public library in the London Borough of Islington, England. The library sits alongside the City and Islington College Centre for Lifelong Learning building, on Blackstock Road. Both were opened in January 2004.

== History ==
Investment by the New Labour government in further education programmes led to the redevelopment of a site on Blackstock Road to become the City & Islington College Lifelong Learning Centre (now Capital City College).

The new building was designed by WilkinsonEyre with Stafford Critchlow as the centre's architect. They created an ambitious design that wrapped around the existing Victorian School Board. Commenting on the structure, journalist Robert Nurden called it a "swish glass-and-steel structure" and a "prototype for an exciting range of new colleges of further education."

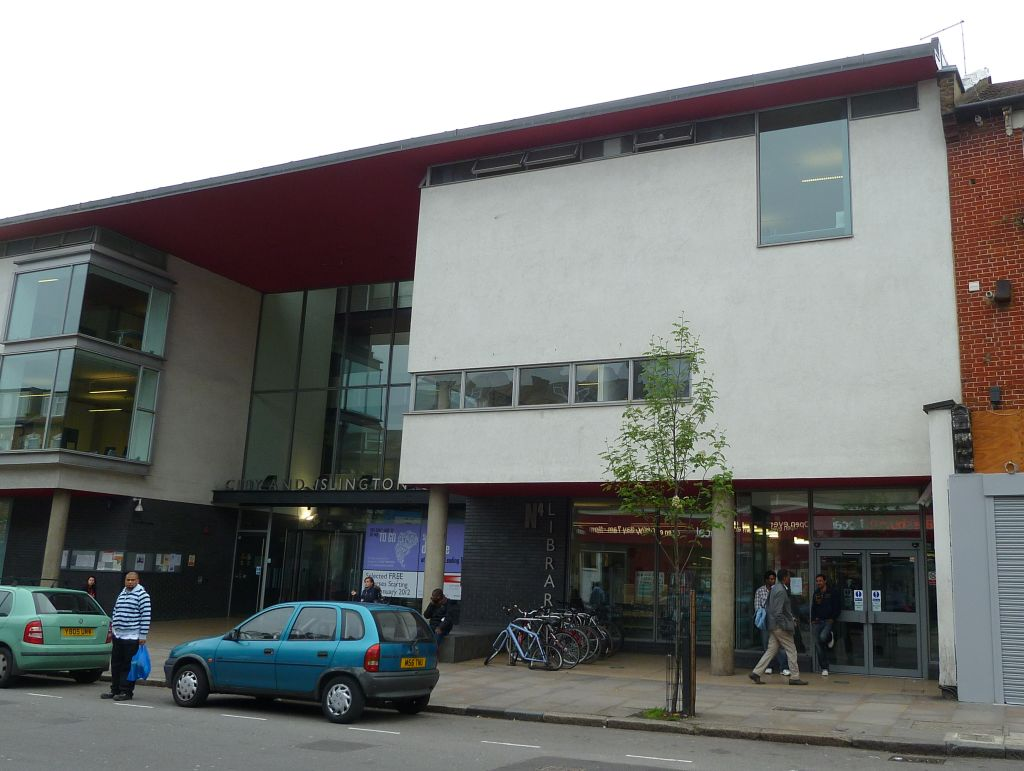
A shot of the broader building in 2012

As part of the redesign, a new public library (N4) was, "unusually," placed at the centre, connected directly to other parts of the college. The new design was presented in an OECD working paper, as part of the Programme on Educational Building in 2022, with the noted ambition that public library users will be attracted into the College (and vice versa). Architect David Gibson named the N4 library one of his "favorite" buildings in Islington.

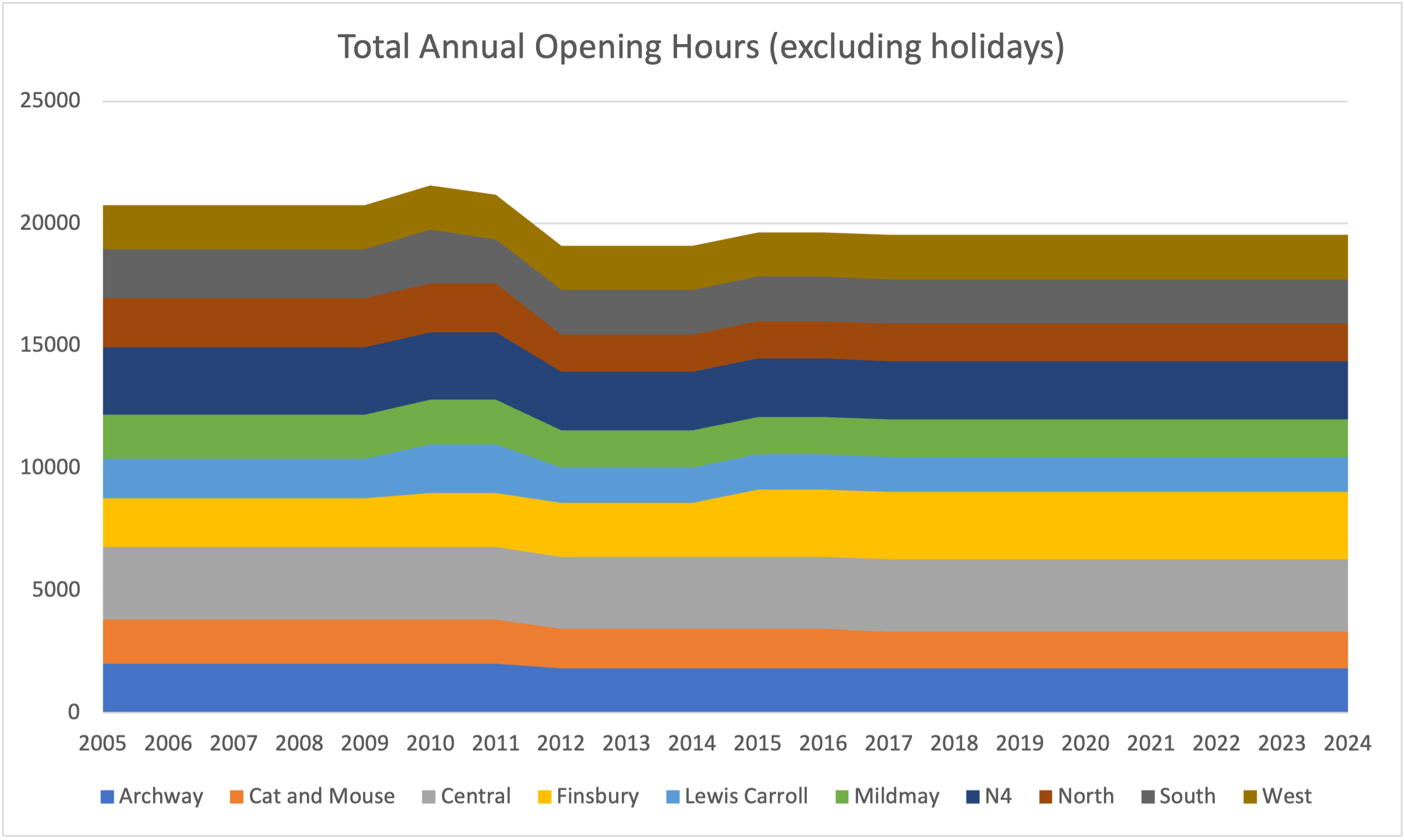
The N4 library saw its opening hours drop by 15% following budget cuts in 2011.

The N4 library is operated by a partnership between the College and the Islington Council. In the context of budget cuts between 2010-2014, the N4 was one of the few libraries that was not threatened with closure. Following the decision to keep all libraries open, however, the library saw its opening hours drop by about 15% relative to 2010. In 2024, the N4 library was open for a total of 2,400 hours, third in the service after the Central and Finsbury libraries. The library is open every day except Sundays though with reduced hours on Thursdays.

== Services ==
The library is one of the most popular libraries in the service. In 2024/25, the Library had 2,418 active members (4th in the service), and 90,079 visits over the year (4th in the service).

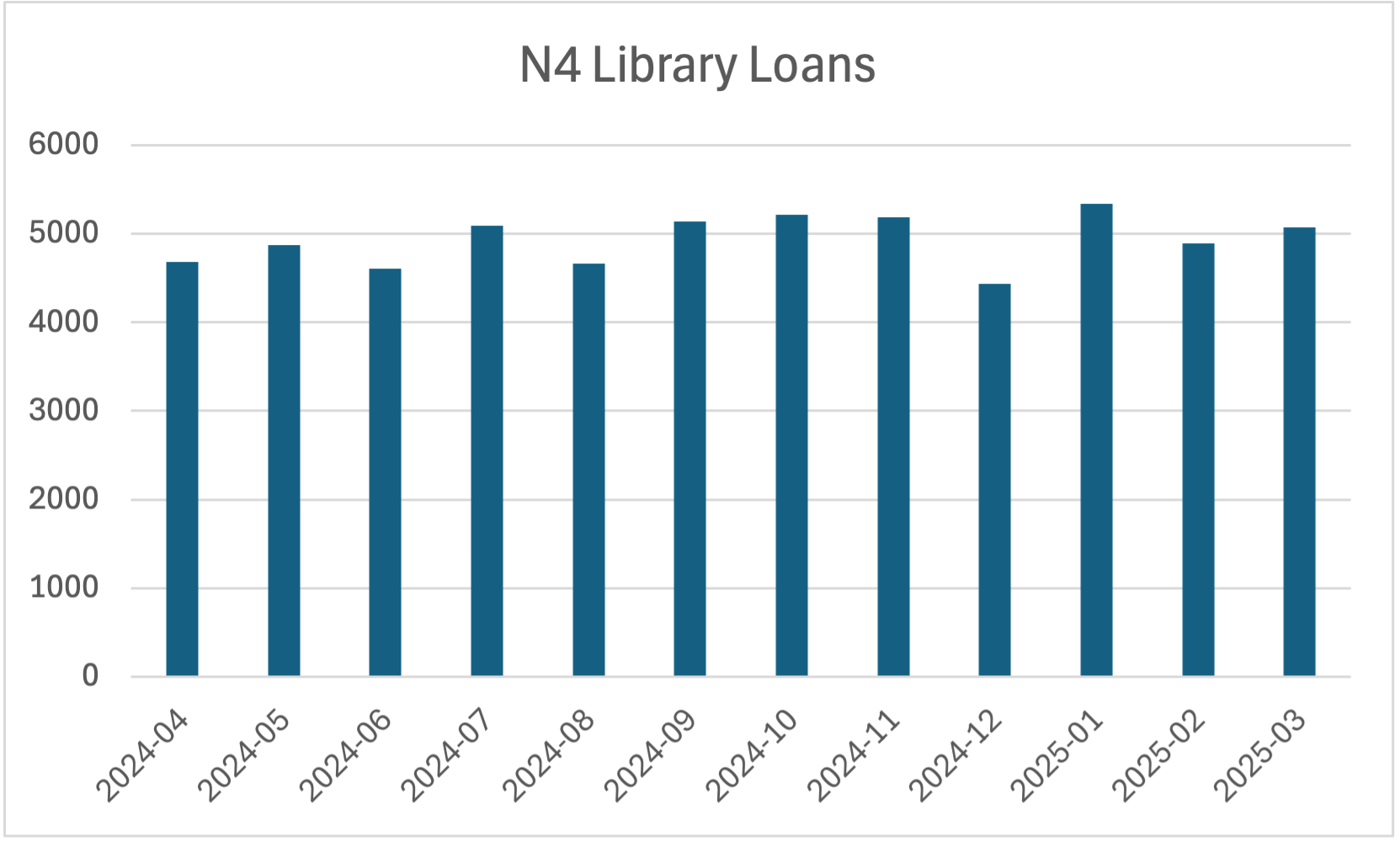
In the autumn, loans exceeded 5,000 items per month in 2024

On average, it performed 4,930 loans per month (3rd in the service). On top of serving as a lending library, the N4 library provides access to 12 free public computers, free wifi, printing facilities, and study space.

The library organizes a number of events—in the past decade it has hosted events around festive lighting, the Six Book Challenge, the Word Festival, and World Book Day. In 2024/25, the N4 library welcomed 4,873 attendees for events – 8% of attendees to all Islington Library events.

The library is fully wheelchair accessible, and has adapted toilets.

== See also ==
- Islington Borough Council
- Islington Libraries
- Capital City College
