= Croydon Mosque =

Mosque in London, England, United Kingdom

Coordinates: 51.3895°N 0.1124°W

Croydon Mosque & Islamic Centre
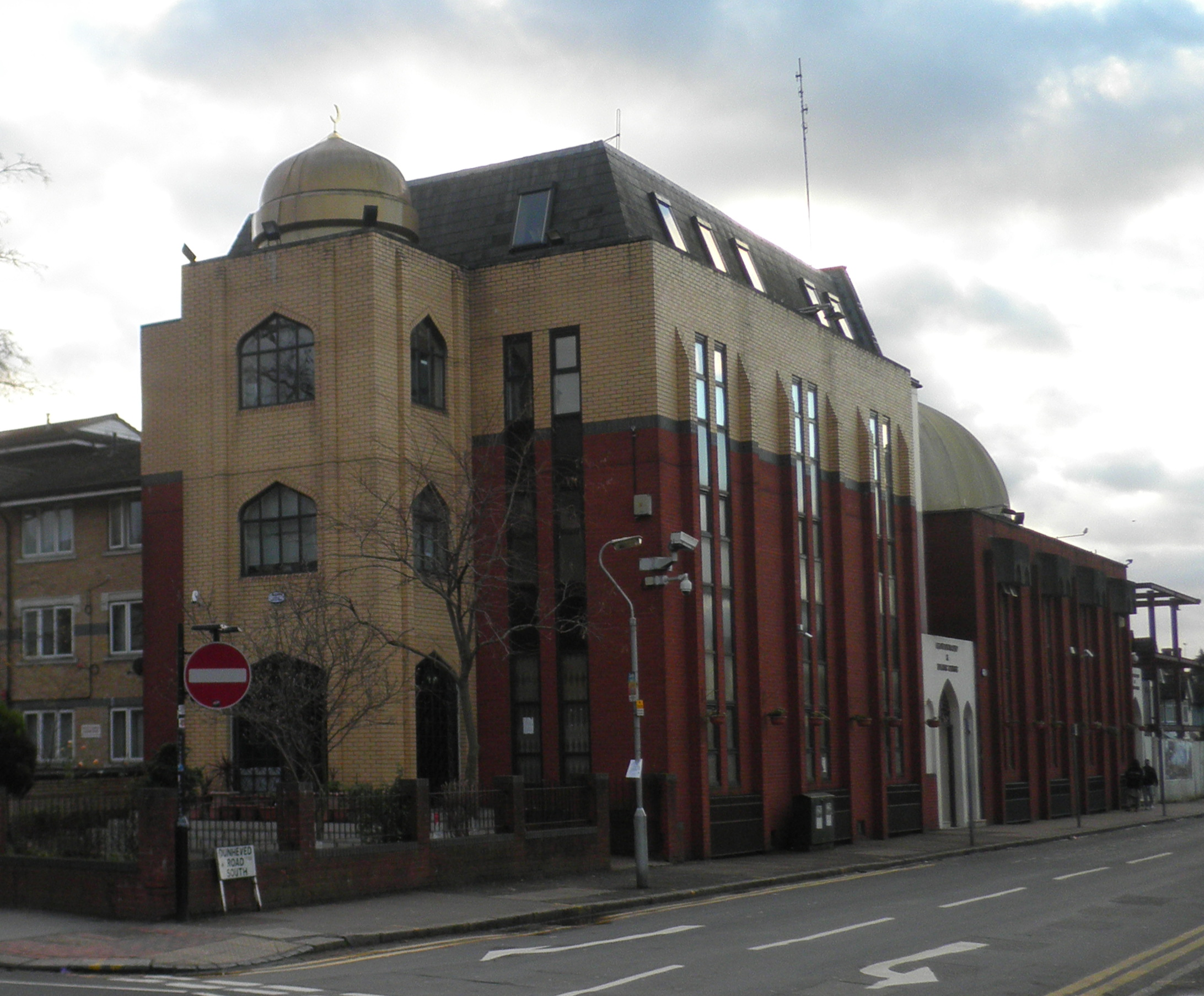

Religion
- Affiliation: Deobandi Islam
- Ownership: Croydon Mosque Association
- Leadership: Imam(s): Mufti M. Yusuf Danka; Moulana Inaam-ul-haq Malik

Location
- Location: London, United Kingdom

Architecture
- Type: Mosque
- Style: Modern
- Date established: 1967

Specifications
- Capacity: 3,000 (including women)
- Dome(s): 2
- Minaret(s): 1

Website
- Official website

Croydon Mosque & Islamic Centre is a mosque situated in Croydon, London.

== History ==
The story of Croydon Mosque began from informal gatherings in the basement of 32 Derby Road, West Croydon in the mid-1960s. After 32 Derby Road received a compulsory purchase order to make way for the Handcroft Road Housing Redevelopment, the Croydon Mosque Association was formed in 1970, and began renting a vacant 'office area' at 45 Wellesley Road to meet and pray.

A madrasah, the five times a day congregational salah, a wudhu area, regular "jalsah's," the two madrasah mini-bus system, Wing Chun classes and a youth club began; over the 13 years while at the ground floor Wellesley Road site. On the suggestion from the local Kenyan community; a Qari, who was also a Hafiz and Alim was employed. The first ever imam was Moulana Yusuf Ismail Patel, an Indian-born Islamic scholar who had relocated to Mauritius before later settling in the UK. The Muslim community were again asked to move, as now 45 Wellesley Road was to be redeveloped, and the mosque moved to its current premises at 525 London Road in 1978. However, redevelopment plans twice had to be put on hold due to lack of funds. The association was able to complete the work thanks to donations, including a gift of more than £100,000 from Shah Abdullah of Saudi Arabia, after a plea from then Croydon North East MP Bernard Weatherill. Phase one of the mosque's renovation was concluded by the completion of its dome in 1988. Within a decade, phase two was also complete, with new offices and prayer space being built.

In April 2012, phase three plans were unveiled for a "green" four-storey extension, to be used as a women and children's centre and an 18-metre minaret. The new building will also increase the mosque's capacity to 4,000, reflecting the growth of Croydon's Muslim community since the centre was built in the 1980s. Members of the mosque have donated around £500,000 to fund the project.

== Community ==
Originally established to serve a local Muslim community of predominantly East African Asian, Indian and Pakistani immigrants, the mosque now serves a diverse Muslim community from in and around the London Borough of Croydon. In recent years, this has included an increasing number of those of Somalian, Turkish, Afghan, Middle Eastern and Bosnian origin amongst others. The mosque is well attended with over 9,000 people passing through during an average week, increasing to over 30,000 people per week during Ramadan.

== See also ==
- Islam in London
- Islam in the United Kingdom
- Islamic terrorism
- Islamic schools and branches
- Islamism
- Islamism in London
- List of mosques
- List of mosques in the United Kingdom
