= Seven Sisters Road =

Road in north London

Coordinates: 51°33′40″N 0°06′49″W

Seven Sisters Road is a road in north London, England which runs within the boroughs of Islington, Hackney and Haringey. It is an extension of Camden Road, running from Holloway Road (the A1 road) at the Nags Head crossroads then on to another crossroads with Blackstock Road and Stroud Green Road. It carries on uphill alongside Finsbury Park to Manor House, and from there downhill to the junction with Tottenham High Road (the A10 road) at Seven Sisters Corner. The road was authorised in 1829 and constructed in 1833 by the Metropolitan Turnpike Trust. Seven Sisters Road is part of the A503. The stretch running past Finsbury Park is open to the park on the west side, and on the east side are large Victorian villas now used mainly as hotels.

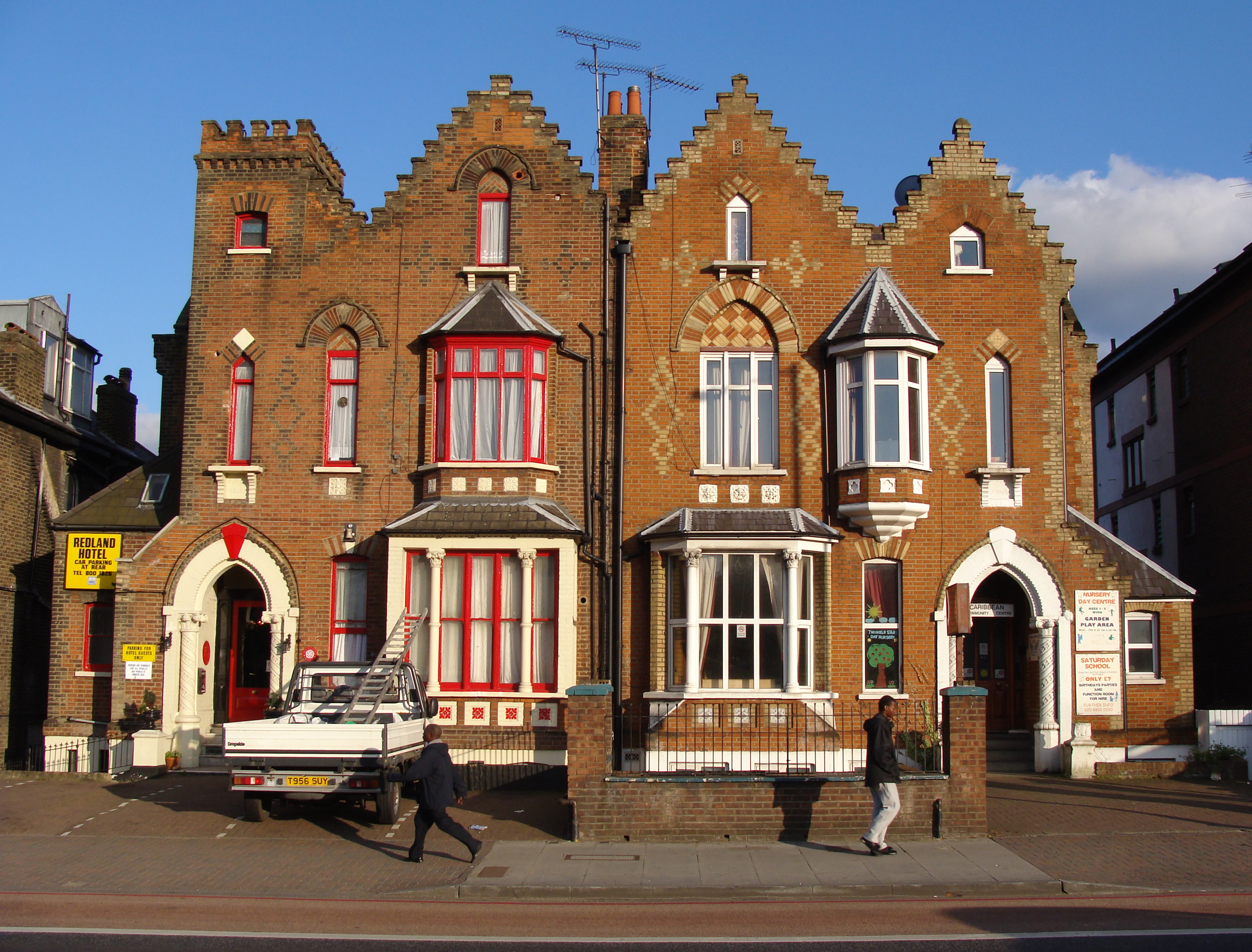
Pair of Victorian gothic houses facing Finsbury Park.

The "Seven Sisters" after which the road is named were seven trees located opposite its junction with Tottenham High Road. This is made clear in the legislation authorising its construction, where the route of the road was described as running "from the Stamford Hill Road in the Parish of Tottenham, in the said County of Middlesex, nearly opposite to certain Trees called the Seven Sisters".

This junction is known as Wards Corner, reflecting the name of the large department store that stood on this corner. The Hetchins bicycle shop and frame factory were situated in Seven Sisters Road, on the site of what is now Apex House.

In the early morning hours of 19 June 2017, a man rammed a vehicle, hitting pedestrians on Seven Sisters Road near the Finsbury Park Mosque. One person was killed and about 10 were injured during the attack.

== Buildings ==
Notable buildings along the road include:

- The Rainbow Theatre
- The Sir George Robey (pub; demolished 2015)
- Finsbury Park station (side entrance)

== References in popular culture ==
Welsh singer Shirley Bassey was a resident of Seven Sisters Road during the 1950s before she became famous.

The 1979 single "Saturday Night (Beneath the Plastic Palm Trees)" by the Leyton Buzzards features the line "I discovered heaven in the Seven Sisters Road".

Portland, Oregon based rock band Dan Reed Network released a song written by Dan Reed called Seven Sisters Road on the album Slam in 1989. The song was also included on the album Live at Last in 1997.

The Suede song "By the Sea" from the 1996 album Coming Up contains the line "And we said our goodbyes to the bank, left Seven Sisters for a room in a seaside shack".

Rob Fleming, the main character in Nick Hornby's 1995 book High Fidelity, lives in Seven Sisters Road.

The Swedish singer Meja's 1998 album "Seven Sisters" featured a track called Seven Sisters Road and contained the lyric "I'm going home on the Seven Sisters Road".

London electropop band Real Lies released a 2015 single entitled Seven Sisters which followed their earlier single, of a similar road theme, 'North Circular'.

The road is immortalised in the song "Seven Sisters" by London-based rock band Desperate Measures. It's included on their 2024 album Sublime Destruction, released through Cadiz Music.

Seven Sisters is the home of UK Alt Rock band Wolf Alice vocalist/guitarist/flautist/pianist/songwriter Ellie Rowsell and is mentioned in the Wolf Alice song 'The Sofa' from their international best selling 2025 Sony album 'The Clearing'.
