= Londonistan =

Sobriquet referring to London and its growing Muslim population

Proportion of residents stating they were Muslim in the 2011 census in Greater London

"Londonistan" (also Londonabad) is a sobriquet referring to the British capital of London and the alleged growing influence of its Muslim population in the late 20th- and early 21st-century.

The word is a portmanteau of the UK's capital and the Persian suffixes -stan, and -abad, meaning "land", and "town of" respectively, used by several countries in South and Central Asia. The term has been used in a number of publications, including The New York Times, Vanity Fair, The Weekly Standard, and in the 2006 book Londonistan: How Britain is Creating a Terror State Within.

== Origin of the term ==
According to Omar Nasiri:

The mid- to late 1990s were the years when Britain's capital earned the sobriquet of "Londonistan," a title provided by French officials infuriated at the growing presence of Islamist radicals in London and the failure of British authorities to do anything about it. [...] Raids in France and Belgium had produced phone and fax numbers linked to the United Kingdom, and names of suspects were passed on. Some French officials believe that if more had been done by Britain at the time, the network behind the summer of 1995 bombings might have been broken up and the attacks prevented.

The bombings and attempted bombings, mostly in the French capital of Paris, in the summer and autumn of 1995 by Armed Islamic Group (GIA), killed eight people and injured more than 100. The French observed that a number of Muslim radicals from London had connections to these bombings. Around 1995, French intelligence coined the term "Londonistan" for the city of London.

According to critics, the UK's "deep tradition of civil liberties and protection of political activists" led to the country becoming "a crossroads for would-be terrorists" for a decade after the mid-1990s. The Islamists used London "as a home base" to "raise money, recruit members and draw inspiration from the militant messages." The UK Government's perceived unwillingness to prosecute or extradite terrorist suspects provoked tensions with countries in which terrorist attacks occurred. Allegations of a British policy of appeasement of Islamists were made and denied by members of the British Government who debated the issue.

== Late 1980s onwards ==
In March 2020, Jonathan Evans, Former Director General, MI5 gave an interview and commented on Londonistan: 'There are various conspiracy theories about the Londonistan period including the notion that Her Majesty’s Government (HMG) in some way gave a free pass to the terrorist sympathizers in the U.K. on the basis that they would not attack us. This is a complete fabrication. The problem was that we didn’t actually know what was going on because we were not looking. There was all sorts of stuff going on that we just were not aware of. It was not that we were deliberately turning a blind eye, just that we had not noticed'.

The term has been linked to the similar Islamophobic conspiracy theory of Eurabia.

In September 2023, Conservative Party candidate for the 2024 London mayoral election Susan Hall was reported to have liked a tweet that described London's mayor Sadiq Khan as "our nipple height mayor of Londonistan".

== Appropriation ==
Currently Islam is the fastest growing religion in London. It makes up about 15% of London's population. With the election of Sadiq Khan as Mayor of London, Richard Seymour wrote an essay in Al Jazeera headlined "Sadiq Khan's victory and free Londonistan", claiming that the term Londonistan was being "joyfully, ironically appropriated by those who are glad to see a racist campaign defeated. Welcome to the 21st century. Welcome to free Londonistan."

== See also ==
- Islamism in the United Kingdom
- Muslim patrol incidents in London
- Islam in the United Kingdom
- Islam in London
- Demographics of London
- List of geographic portmanteaus
