= Mohammed Kozbar =

British Muslim Community leader

- محمد كزبر
- Occupation: Chairman of Finsbury Park Mosque

Mohammed Kozbar (Arabic: محمد كزبر) is a trustee and Chairman of the Finsbury Park Mosque (North London Central Mosque, England). He is a former Deputy Secretary-General of the Muslim Council of Britain.

== Professional Activities ==
Mohammed Kozbar is a prominent British Muslim community leader, currently serving as the Chairman of Finsbury Park Mosque, Chairman of the National Members Council of the Muslim Council of Britain (MCB). He is also a long-standing member of the Islington Faiths Forum, and a member of the Islington hate crime forum representing the Muslim community across North London. A committed advocate for interfaith dialogue, community cohesion, Social justice and anti-Islamophobia efforts, Mohammed has played a key role in reshaping perceptions of Muslim civic engagement in the UK.

Mohammed holds a Master’s degree in Charity Management from St Mary’s University, which has equipped him with the academic and strategic tools to lead one of the most high-profile mosques in the country.

== Leadership at Finsbury Park Mosque ==
Mohammed has been at the helm of Finsbury Park Mosque as Chairman since 2010, having joined the institution as a trustee in 2005. At the time, the mosque was emerging from a period of extreme difficulty, widely associated in the media with extremism during the early 2000s. Under his leadership, the mosque has undergone a complete transformation: from drawing less than 50 attendees to Friday prayers, it now welcomes thousands of worshippers from diverse ethnic backgrounds each week.

More than just a place of worship, Finsbury Park Mosque under Mohammed's stewardship has become a model for faith-based civic engagement. The mosque now runs social support services, youth activities, educational classes, and community outreach programmes—offering a wide range of services for both Muslims and the wider non-Muslim community.

Commitment to Interfaith and Community Relations

A key focus of Mohammed’s leadership has been interfaith work and building bridges between communities. He led the mosque to become a member of the Inter Faith Network UK, and he serves as a Muslim representative in the Islington Faiths Forum, an umbrella body for religious organisations across the borough. Under his leadership, Finsbury Park Mosque was among the first in the country to host a "Visit My Mosque" Day, inviting neighbours of all backgrounds to meet their Muslim neighbours and better understand Islam.

He also launched one of the UK’s first street iftars, a communal event held during Ramadan where Muslims and non-Muslims come together to share food, promote unity, and celebrate community spirit. He has hosted interfaith commemorations such as for the Srebrenica genocide, further underlining the mosque’s role as a place of remembrance, healing, and solidarity.

== Advocacy Against Islamophobia ==
Mohammed is a committed campaigner against Islamophobia and all forms of hate crime, with a particular focus on supporting Muslim women, who are statistically the most affected. He has coordinated events, training sessions, and campaigns in partnership with local authorities and national organisations to raise awareness and challenge discriminatory practices.

The mosque has remained steadfast in its outreach even after receiving hate mail and threats, demonstrating Mohammed’s refusal to allow fear or prejudice to derail its mission. Under his leadership, Finsbury Park Mosque became a safe space for dialogue, resistance to hate, and resilience against marginalisation.

== Crisis Leadership: The 2017 Terror Attack ==
Mohammed’s leadership came under intense national spotlight in June 2017, following the terrorist attack near Finsbury Park Mosque, where a far-right extremist drove a van into worshippers, killing one and injuring many others. In the face of this tragedy, Mohammed responded with measured, compassionate, and inclusive leadership.

Rather than allowing the incident to isolate or radicalise the community, he worked to strengthen community ties, offering support to the victims and their families, and holding open forums for local residents. He engaged directly with government officials, including then- Prince Charles, Prime Minister Theresa May, the Mayor of London, and Metropolitan Police leadership, advocating for stronger protections for Muslim communities and policy changes to address the rise in far-right extremism.

== Recognition and Impact ==
The significant progress made under Mohammed’s leadership was recognised when Finsbury Park Mosque received the prestigious Visible Quality Mark from Community Matters—a national award for excellence in community organisations. This marked the first time the award was given to a mosque, and only the third time to any faith organisation in the UK.

He is widely regarded as a leading figure within British Muslim communities, both as a spiritual guide and as a civic leader. His approach is rooted in the principles of sincerity, accountability, inclusivity, and justice.

== Media and Public Engagement ==
In addition to his community work, Mohammed is a regular media commentator and columnist in different media outlets, where he writes on topics ranging from Middle East politics to British Muslim affairs, Islamophobia, human rights, social justice and integration. His insights have appeared across print and broadcast media, and he is frequently invited to speak at national conferences, academic institutions, and government forums.

== Comments on Hamas founder ==
In 2010, Kozbar visited the grave of Hamas founder Sheikh Ahmed Yassin, whom he reportedly described as "the master of the martyrs of resistance, the mujahid [holy warrior] sheikh, the teacher". At this time, Hamas was not designated a terror group. He has also been pictured with Hamas leader Ismail Haniyeh.

== Scotland Yard ==
Kozbar had previously given advice to Scotland Yard as part of the London Muslim Communities Forum, and was reportedly invited to a buffet dinner with Met Police chief Mark Rowley The Met Police announced that they had ceased engagement with Kozbar on 24 February 2024, after one of his social media posts from January 2024 was brought to their attention.

== Sources ==
Finsbury Park mosque.
