= Finsbury Park Mosque =

Mosque in north London, England

- North London Central Mosque
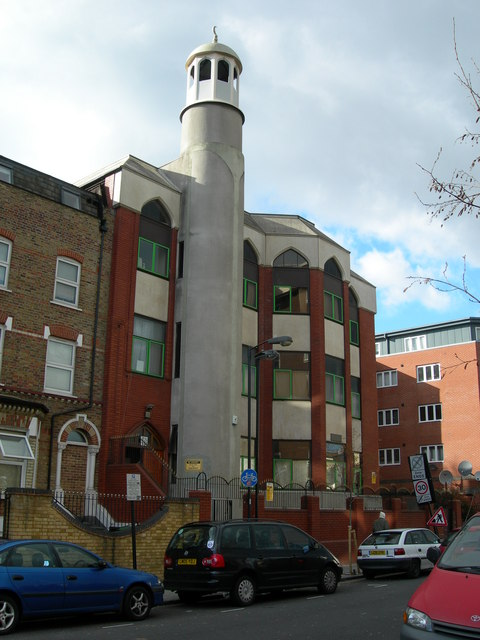

Religion
- Affiliation: Muslim Council of Britain
- Leadership: Mohammed Kozbar

Location
- Location: Finsbury Park, London; United Kingdom
- Interactive map of Finsbury Park Mosque
- Coordinates: 51°33′49″N 0°06′21″W

Architecture
- Type: Mosque
- Established: founded 1988, main building 1994

Specifications
- Capacity: 2,000
- Minaret: 1

Website
- https://finsburyparkmosque.org/

The Finsbury Park Mosque, also known as the North London Central Mosque, is a five-storey mosque located next to Finsbury Park station close to Arsenal Football Club's Emirates Stadium, in the London Borough of Islington. It serves the local community in Islington and the surrounding boroughs of North London, and it is registered as a charity in England.

The mosque gained national attention when Abu Hamza al-Masri, a radical preacher convicted of terrorism, became its imam in 1997. In 2003, the mosque was closed by its trustees following an anti-terrorist police raid, and re-opened in 2005 under new leadership.

== History ==
=== 1988–1997: Opening ===
In the 1960s, a small room in a guest house at 7 Woodfall Road, London N4, was used as a prayer room and community centre for the handful of Bangladeshi Muslims then working and living in the district, and had become inadequate for the growing Muslim community by the time the building was compulsorily purchased by the local authority as part of a Housing Action Plan. The community formed a Muslim Welfare Centre, and in 1975, purchased its own property at St. Thomas's Road, later also acquiring neighbouring plots. A mosque first came into use on the site in 1988, when it was one of the largest mosques in the UK. In 1994, a new five-storey mosque building was officially opened in a ceremony attended by Prince Charles and King Fahd of Saudi Arabia who had contributed funds for the building.

=== 1997–2003: Under Abu Hamza al-Masri ===
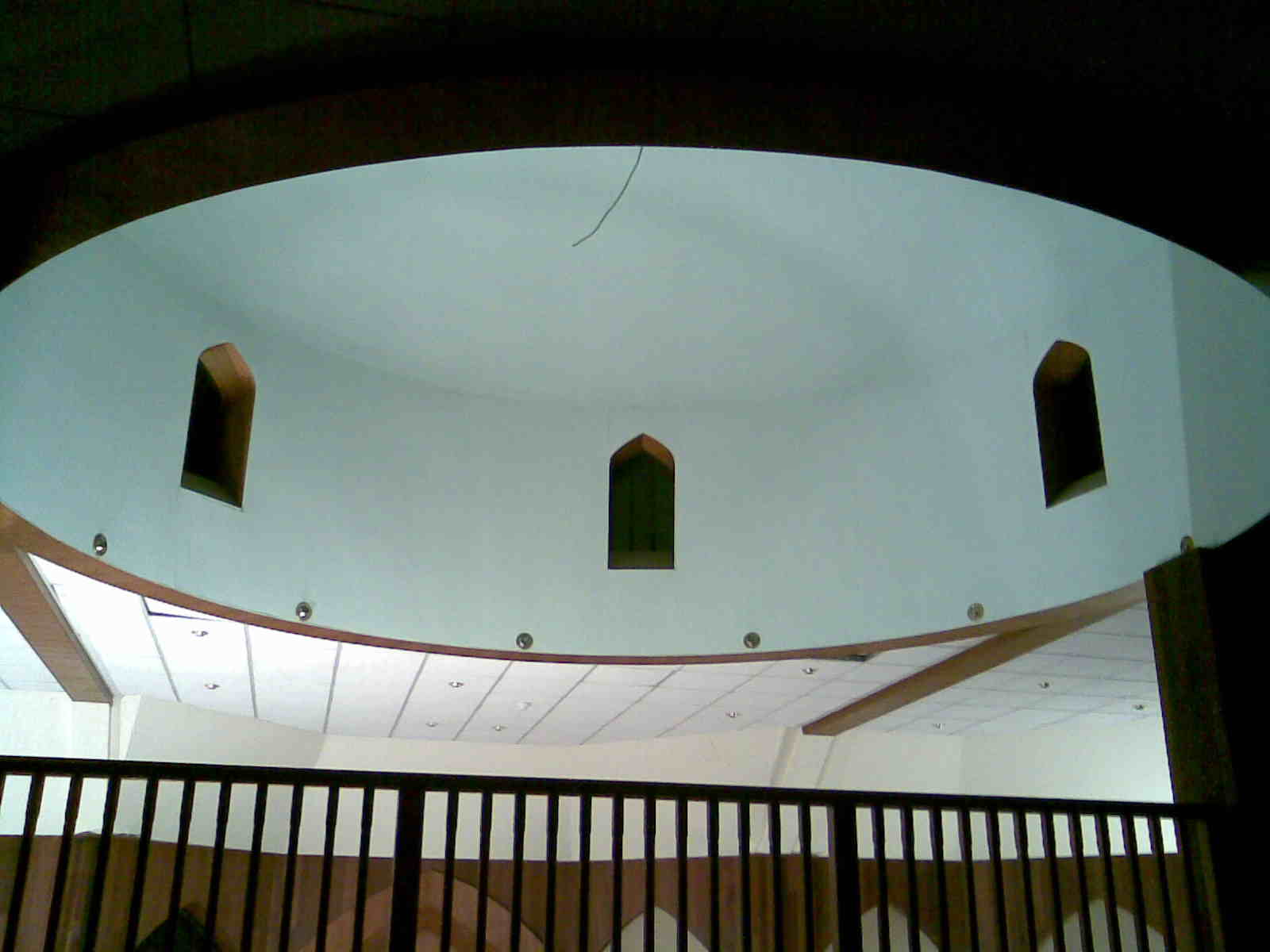
The interior of the dome inside the North London Central Mosque

The mosque rose to notoriety after Abu Hamza al-Masri became its imam in 1997. In the late 1990s and early 2000s, he consolidated his control of the mosque, with his followers preventing anyone they did not trust from entering it. On March 13, 1998, a rally was held in London for the 'Kosovo Jihad' and was allegedly backed by over 50 Islamic groups including the Taliban and Hamas. At the same time, the Islamic society of London was led by a Kosovar-Albanian Sheik, Muhammad Stubla, who was lobbying and gathering money for the Kosovo Liberation Army using donations from Muslims attending the mosque. According to the mosque's current administration, although originally appointed by the trustees, Abu Hamza gradually took over the mosque from them. When the mosque's trustees asked him to leave, they allege that he resorted to intimidation. In October 1998, the trustees went to the High Court to stop Abu Hamza from preaching at the mosque. They were granted an injunction, but it was not enforced. Many trustees reported being barred from their own mosque by Abu Hamza's supporters and even being assaulted. In April 2002, the Charity Commission for England and Wales suspended Abu Hamza from preaching, but he continued anyway. Djamel Beghal used the mosque as his "base," as he planned a foiled 2001 suicide bombing of the American Embassy in Paris.

During Abu Hamza's control, the mosque's attendance dropped. Most of the attendees were his followers. The mosque also became a meeting point for many radical Muslims. According to leaked US documents, Finsbury Park mosque previously served "as a haven" for Islamic extremists who subsequently fought against allied forces in Afghanistan. Al Qaeda operatives including "shoebomber" Richard Reid and Zacarias Moussaoui attended the mosque. In 2002, The Guardian reported that weapons training had taken place inside the building. On 11 September 2002, a conference was held at the mosque titled "A Towering Day in History" to praise the September 11 hijackers on the anniversary of the attack with the participation of Anjem Choudary, Abu Hamza, Omar Bakri Mohammed, Mohammad al-Massari and others. In the late 1990s, Abu Hamza and the mosque became the leading international spiritual reference supporting the Armed Islamic Group of Algeria (GIA) in the Algerian Civil War, at a time when the GIA was spurned even by most Salafi-jihadist groups for their massacres of civilians.

The United States charged Abu Hamza as a "terrorist facilitator with a global reach" in 2004; he was arrested, sentenced in the UK to a seven-year prison sentence in 2006, and subsequently extradited to the United States where he was sentenced to life in prison without the possibility of parole. According to disclosures via WikiLeaks, several Guantanamo Bay detention camp detainees passed through the mosque prior to their subsequent activities.

The mosque's role in facilitating terror operations during these years is often mentioned in the context of the Londonistan, which was widely used by the international espionage community to describe London, due to the liberty afforded to Muslim extremists by British authorities.

=== 2003–2005: Shutdown and re-opening ===
In 2003, 150 anti-terrorist police officers conducted a nighttime raid on the building as part of the investigation into the alleged Wood Green ricin plot. Police seized a stun gun and a CS gas canister, among other items, and arrested seven men under the Terrorism Act 2000. The police action had the effect of removing Abu Hamza and his supporters from the mosque.

After the raid, the police handed the mosque to its trustees, who promptly closed it for repairs. The trustees also stated that they were closing it "while it was cleaned of the physical and spiritual filth...". Abu Hamza continued to preach each Friday in the street outside the closed mosque until his arrest in May 2004.

In August 2004, the mosque was reopened, but after reports "hardliners" again asserted control in December 2004, the Charity Commission intervened again and appointed a new board of trustees with the support of the Muslim Association of Britain (MAB), who were asked by the police, the former trustees, and others to try to turn it around. After changing the locks and taking physical control of the building, the mosque was reopened under heavy police presence.

Dr. Azzam Tamimi, a leading member of MAB, described the mosque takeover as "one of the very rare success stories where the Muslim community and others came together and decided to rescue the mosque", although a minority complained of lack of consultation, with Ashgar Bukhari of the campaign group Muslim Public Affairs Committee UK saying that the committee should have been elected. The new management condemned former imam Abu Hamza.

=== 2006–2013: Reformation ===
Since reopening, it is widely acknowledged that the mosque has not been associated with radical views. British authorities have described the transformation of the mosque to be a major accomplishment. The Telegraph reported that Finsbury Park Mosque's transformation from "radical hotbed" to "model of community relations" has "since been widely regarded as a success story". The mosque made an effort to build ties with the local community, including local MP Jeremy Corbyn, and started engaging non-Muslims and local authorities.

In 2007, the Policy Exchange think tank, in a report titled The hijacking of British Islam, said they had purchased a number of allegedly extremist Islamic books at the mosque. The mosque disputed the allegation, and sued for libel, a case that was struck on the technicality that the mosque as an unincorporated charitable trust is not a corporate entity or legal person and thus not able to claim defamation. Subsequent action by the mosque and its trustees was settled out of court, with the mosque paying some of Policy Exchange's legal fees and with Policy Exchange, while neither retracting nor apologising for their claim of sale, stating that they "never sought to suggest that the literature cited in the Report was sold or distributed at the mosque with the knowledge or consent of the Mosque's trustees or staff."; both sides claimed the settlement as a victory.

=== 2014–2016: Incidents ===
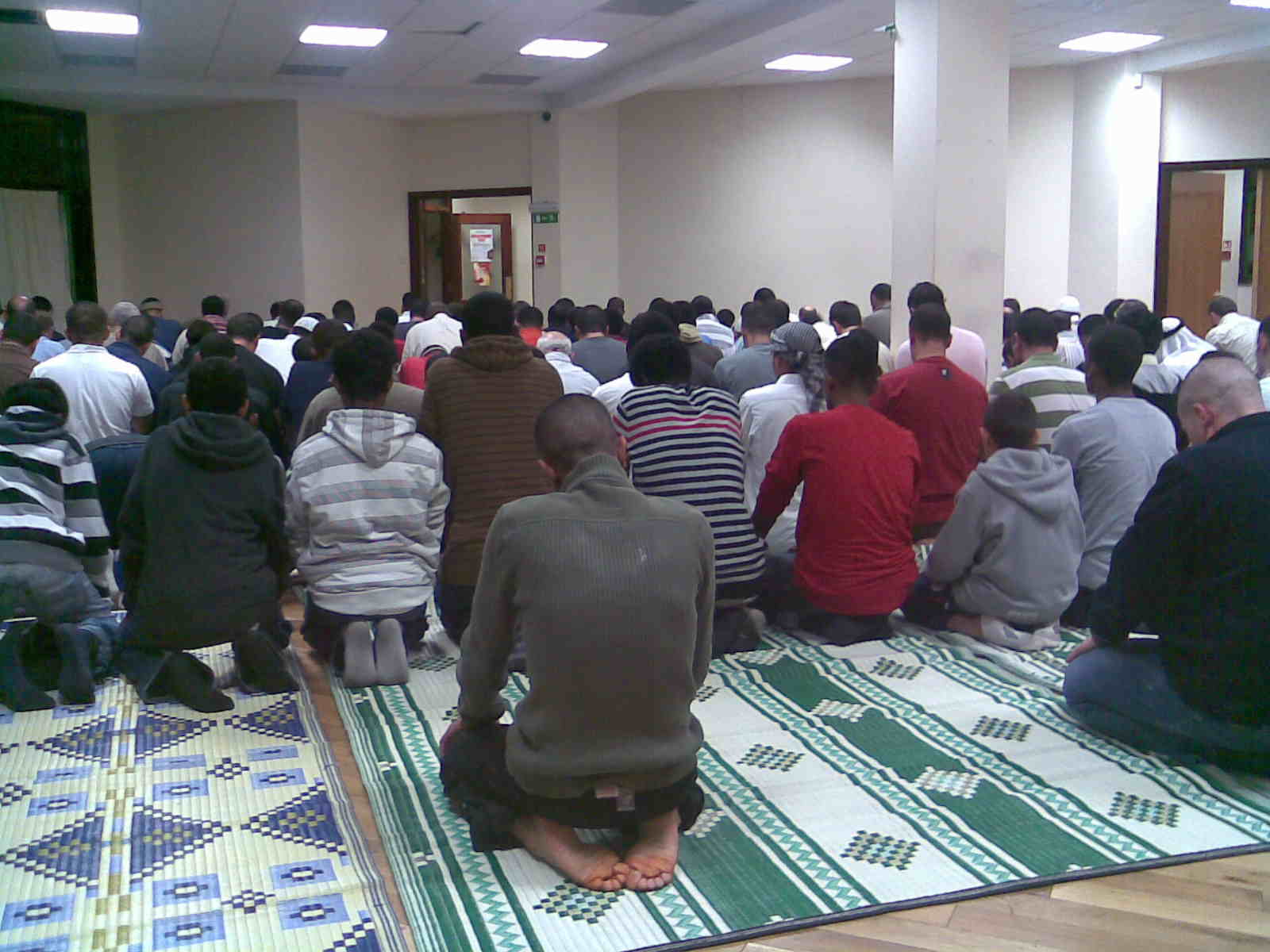
Prayers at the mosque in 2008

In 2014, HSBC Bank closed Finsbury Park Mosque's bank account, and the mosque, unable to open an account with any other high street banks, was forced to turn to a small Islamic bank. The closure was prompted by information in World-Check, a confidential database owned by Thomson Reuters, about reported links to terrorism before 2005 as well as the purported links of a current mosque trustee to Muslim Brotherhood, considered a terrorist organization by the US, UAE, and Saudi Arabia. In response, the mosque filed a legal case against Thomson Reuters, which was settled in 2017, with Reuters agreeing to issue an apology and pay damages.

In August 2014, police arrived at the mosque after a dispute between an Al Arabiya reporter and the mosque's manager. Both men called the police. The mosque manager claimed that the reporter was engaged in "malicious journalism," while the reporter claimed that he was detained by the manager until the police arrived 30 minutes later.

In January 2015, after the Charlie Hebdo shooting, the mosque's "former links with radical preachers resurfaced after the Paris attacks as it was alleged that the Charlie Hebdo gunmen were followers of Djamel Beghal, a radical preacher based there in the late 1990s." The mosque received death threats and hate mail. In November 2015, following a mail threat, a man attempted to set fire to the mosque, an attack that reportedly failed because of heavy rain. In July 2016, a man threw rotten pork meat at the mosque.

=== 2017 terrorist attack ===
Shortly after midnight on 19 June 2017, several worshippers leaving the nearby Finsbury Park Mosque were struck by a hired van in a terrorist attack. One person died of multiple injuries and ten were injured. The attack was widely condemned and seen by local Muslim leaders as part of rising Islamophobia in the United Kingdom. Following the attack, Mohammed Kozbar, the chairman of the Finsbury Park mosque, said that the mosque had received multiple death threats. In February 2018, the perpetrator, Darren Osborne, was sentenced to life imprisonment with a minimum tariff of 43 years with simultaneous terms for murder and attempted murder.

== Community outreach ==
The mosque received the "Best outreach programme" award at the British Beacon Mosque Awards in 2018. The mosque is a member of the Islington Faith Forum, which received the Queen's Award for Voluntary Service in 2018, and an affiliate of the Muslim Council of Britain. It was the recipient of a Visible Quality Mark by the national body Community Matters in 2014, the first time being awarded to a Muslim place of worship in the UK. The venue has often been used by the local MP, Jeremy Corbyn, Local Police and local Councillors for constituency surgeries, meetings and speeches.

The mosque organises various community events throughout the year, including an annual open day for the local community and schools, and since 2014, this has been held in association with Muslim Council of Britain as part of the national Visit My Mosque Day scheme. This event consists of a tour of the mosque, an exhibition on Islam and the mosque and a wide range of activities that are also organised by members of the wider community. Since 2017, following the Finsbury Park terror attack where a worshipper was killed, and many were injured, the mosque has held an annual Street Iftar event during the month of Ramadan, in which the local and wider community are invited to share a meal that coincides with the breaking of the fast. This event has been attended by various faith and community leaders, local councillors and MPs including Dominic Grieve and Anna Soubry.

The mosque was part of Macmillan Coffee Morning initiative to raise money for cancer victims and organised the first ever "Autism hour" in a mosque with the National Autistic Society.

The mosque has held various Hate Crime Awareness events throughout the years, and in 2015, it launched the Meals for All initiative, in which the mosque provides a hot meal for the homeless people from the local community and those in need, once every week.

== See also ==
- Islam in London
- Islamic schools and branches
- Islam in the United Kingdom
- List of mosques in the United Kingdom
