= Muslim Welfare House =

Islamic organization based in London, England, United Kingdom

The Muslim Welfare House is the headquarters of a network of Muslim community centres, located at Seven Sisters Road in London, in the United Kingdom. The charity earned £856,000 in 2016, and has 13 employees, as of June 2017.
