= Blackstock Road =

Street in North London

Coordinates: 51.5625°N 0.10105°W

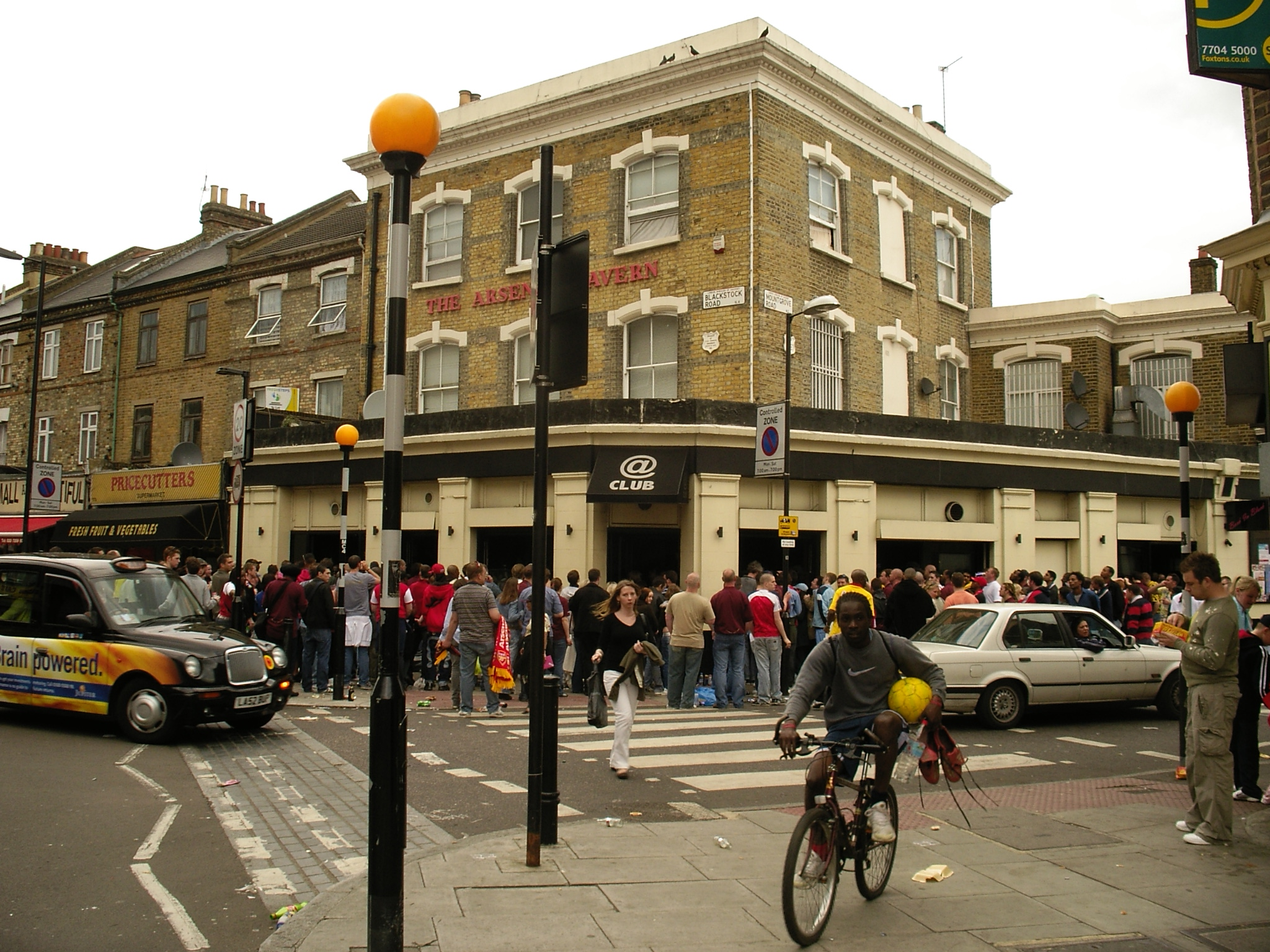
The Arsenal Tavern, Blackstock Road on a Match Day

Blackstock Road is a major road in North London, England, running from Seven Sisters Road south westerly to Highbury. In November 2025, Time Out named it as one of their 'coolest streets in Europe'.

== Facilities ==
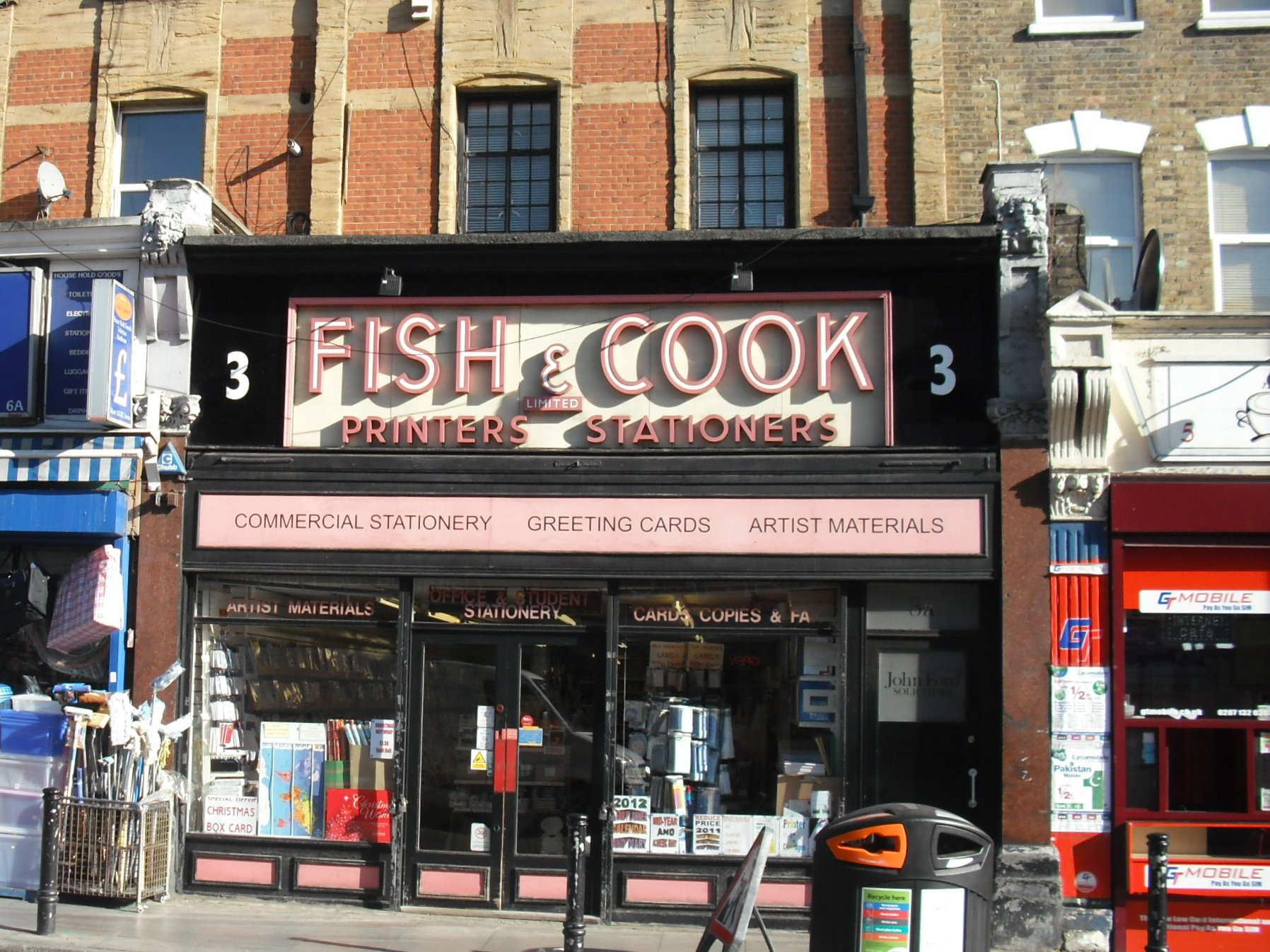
Fish and Cook stationers. In the offices of Peace News magazine above which, in 1958, artist Gerald Holtom first unveiled the CND logo.

Blackstock Road hosts a diverse array of independent shops, cafes and restaurants. At its south end there are a number of public houses, while at the north end there are Algerian cafés, with many restaurants and shops running along its length up towards Highbury Park. Pubs en route include the Blackstock, The Kings Head, the Arsenal Tavern, the Woodbine, the Gunners and the Bank of Friendship.

== Transport ==
Blackstock Road is very well served by public transport. There are four bus services running along it, the 4, 19, 106 and 236, reaching out to Battersea, Waterloo or Archway, Hackney Wick and Whitechapel respectively. Blackstock Road is also in close proximity to Finsbury Park station at its northern end, providing easy access to the Victoria line and Piccadilly line. Arsenal station on Gillespie Road is within five minutes walk of the southern end of Blackstock Road.

== Police raids ==
On 28 March 2008, the road was the location of a large-scale Metropolitan Police investigation and culminating in raids in which 1,400 officers searched for stolen items and criminal behaviour. According to sources, they found, "350 stolen items including 120 laptops, 110 cameras, 32 iPods, 20 sat-navs and 47 fake passports and driving licences."

According to the Independent newspaper, on 3 November 2009 "riot police returned in force after a flood of fresh complaints that it remained a crime hotspot. At least 30 residents have given police statements complaining about intimidation and the sexual harassment of women", "crime and anti-social behaviour."

== History ==
Blackstock Road's original name was Boarded River Lane when it was still a dirt track. The boarded river was a 462 foot-long wooden aqueduct that carried the New River in a north-westerly direction over the shallow valley, Highbury Vale, in order both to carry it over the Hackney Brook and to maintain its height, since at the time it was gravity-fed and open to the elements (in 1866 the New River was diverted into a pipeline alongside Green Lanes). The Hackney Brook flowed from its source in Holloway, past Arsenal tube station and the old Arsenal Stadium, across Blackstock Road just behind the Arsenal Tavern, through Clissold Park, to the north of Abney Park cemetery and to the west of Hackney Downs, through the centre of Hackney before emptying into the River Lea at Hackney Wick. It has been joked that the 'Bank of Friendship' pub is so-named because the people of Highbury would have been able to wave at the folk of Stoke Newington across the boarded river. The boarded river was located just east of the junction of Blackstock and Mountgrove Roads and crossed the Hackney Brook at the rear of the Arsenal Tavern (175, Blackstock Road). As it crossed the valley to the north west it passed the Eel Pie House tavern, which was located approximately at 57, Wilberforce Road, before turning sharply to head just north of east to the Castle pumping station (now climbing centre). Although it has been suggested that the Eel Pie House sourced its eels from the New River, to the extent that the eels served in the Eel Pie House were locally sourced they must been obtained from the Hackney Brook, since the New River supplied drinking water to London and had no connection to the sea.

== In popular culture ==
The road is used as a prominent location in the 2009 film London River.

- It's Grim Up North London – Private Eye cartoon strip

== Other Blackstock Roads ==
There is another Blackstock Road in the Hemsworth area of Sheffield.
