= List of mosques in the United Kingdom =

This is a list of notable mosques in the United Kingdom listed by regions in Scotland, England and Wales.

== England ==
=== London ===
| Name | Images | Location | Year | Groups | Remarks |
EAST LONDON
| Greenwich Islamic Centre (GIC) | | Greenwich | | Sunni | The largest Islamic Centre in South East London |
| Brick Lane Mosque (also known as Jamme Masjid) | | East End | 1976 | U | |
| Ramadan Masjid (also known as Shacklewell Lane Mosque) | | Dalston | 1977 | U | Building originally housed the New Dalston Synagogue |
| Forest Gate Central Masjid | | Forest Gate | | | |
| Suleymaniye Mosque | | Haggerston | 1999 | UKTICC | The tallest minaret in the United Kingdom |
| Waltham Forest Islamic Association (also known as Jamia Ghousia Masjid, Lea Bridge Road Mosque, or WFIA) | | Leyton | 1966 | B | |
| Baitul Ahad Mosque | | Plaistow | 2008 | AMJ | Initially a synagogue, then a church, before it was converted into a mosque |
| Abbey Mills Mosque (also known as Masjid e Ilyas, London Markaz or West Ham Markaz) | | Stratford | 1996 | TJ/D | Greater London Tablighi Jamaat HQ |
| Masjid Abdul Aziz bin Baz (also known as Masjid bin Baz) | | Stratford | 2014 | SA | First Salafi mosque in East London |
| Markazi Masjid | | Tower Hamlets | | | |
| Wapping Noorani Masjid & Cultural Centre | | Wapping | 2012 | U | Previously used as commercial offices |
| East London Mosque | | Whitechapel | 1985 | JI | One of the few mosques in the United Kingdom permitted to use loudspeakers to broadcast the call to prayer |
NORTH LONDON
| Muslim Welfare House | | North London | 1976 | | |
| Madina Mosque Trust (also known as Clapton Masjid or Madina Masjid) | | Clapton | 1984 | D | |
| Rumi Mosque (also known as Rumi Community Centre and Mevlana Rumi Camii) | | Edmonton | 2008 | UKTIA | It was the first mosque in the United Kingdom to have appointed a female head of mosque |
| Finsbury Park Mosque (also known as North London Central Mosque) | | Finsbury Park | 1994 | SA | |
| London Islamic Cultural Society & Mosque (also known as Leytonstone Islamic Association) | | Hornsey | 1998 | U | The mosque extension sits atop the site of Wood Green & Hornsey Synagogue, acquired by the mosque in 1987 |
| Leytonstone Masjid (also known as Wightman Road Mosque) | | Leytonstone | 1976 | D | |
| Palmers Green Mosque (also known as Muslim Community and Education Centre) | | Palmers Green | 1995 | U | |
| London Central Mosque | | Regent's Park | 1977 | Sunni | Capacity of 5,000 worshippers |
| Aziziye Mosque | | Stoke Newington | 1983 | UKTIA | |
| Wembley Central Mosque | | Wembley | 1985 | Sunni | A former church building, converted to a mosque in 1985 |
SOUTH LONDON
| Brixton Mosque | | Brixton | 1990 | SA | |
| Tahir Mosque | | Catford (SE) | 2012 | AMJ | It was previously used as offices by Lewisham Council |
| Darul Amaan Mosque | | Colliers Wood | 1978 | D | |
| Baitus Subhan Mosque | | Croydon | | AMJ | |
| Croydon Mosque (all known as Croydon Mosque & Islamic Centre) | | Croydon | 1967 | | Capacity of 3,000 worshippers |
| Baitus Subhan Mosque | | Croydon | | AMJ | |
| Baitul Ehsan Mosque | | Mitcham | 2017 | AMJ | |
| Baitul Futuh Mosque (also known as the Morden Mosque) | | Morden | 2003 | AMJ | One of the largest mosques in Western Europe, with capacity of 13,000 worshippers. Completed in at a cost of £15 million, entirely from donations of British Ahmadis |
| Fazl Mosque (also known as The London Mosque) | | Southfields | 1926 | AMJ | The first purpose-built mosque in London, inaugurated on 3 October 1926 |
| Wimbledon Mosque | | Wimbledon | 1976 | D | The first mainstream purpose-built mosque in South London and one of the first purpose-built mosques in London. |
WEST LONDON
| Baitul Wahid Mosque | | Feltham | 2012 | AMJ | Capacity of 700 worshippers |
| Harrow Central Mosque | | Harrow | 2011 | Sunni | Completed in 1980, the house structure was rebuilt in the 2010s |
| Baitul Aman Mosque | | Hayes | 2012 | AMJ | |
| Darus Salaam Mosque | | Southall | 2020 | AMJ | |
| White City Mosque (also known as White City Musalla, The Egyptian House or Fine Islamic Centre) | | White City | 2015 | U | |

=== North East ===
| Name | Images | City | Year | Groups | Remarks |
|---|---|---|---|---|---|
| Nasir Mosque | | Hartlepool | 2005 | AMJ | The first purpose-built mosque in the city |
| Farooq E Azam Mosque and Islamic Centre | | Stockton-on-Tees | 2017 | | First mosque in the North-East to be able to play the call to prayer, or Adhan once a week |
| Anware Madinah Masjid | | Sunderland | 2018 | | The largest mosque in the city |

=== North West ===
| Name | Images | City | Year | Groups | Remarks |
|---|---|---|---|---|---|
| Blackpool Central Mosque (also known as Blackpool Central Mosque and Islamic Community Centre) | | Blackpool | 2005 | Sunni | Capacity of 500 worshippers |
| Noor-A-Madina Mosque | Darussalem Education Centre | Blackpool | 2010 | Sunni | Capacity of 200 worshippers |
| Al-Rahma mosque | | Liverpool | 1974 | Sunni | Third mosque in the United Kingdom |
| Bait-ul-Lateef Mosque | | Liverpool | 2016 | AMJ | A former church |
| Darul Amaan Mosque | | Manchester | 2012 | AMJ | |
| Didsbury Mosque | | Manchester | 1962 | SA | Completed in 1883 as Albert Park Methodist Chapel |
| Manchester Central Mosque | | Manchester | | B | Also known as Victoria Park Mosque, sometimes referred to as Jamia Mosque |
| North Manchester Jamé Masjid | | Manchester | | | It is one of the largest Muslim centres in Europe. The mosque is open to all men and women, and its main prayer halls currently hold between 2,500 and 3,000 people during a Friday service, with over 15,000 worshippers walking through the mosque's doors during the multiple services held on the religious festivals of Eid. |
| Madina Masjid & Islamic Centre | | Oldham | 1987 | | One of Oldham's oldest mosques. Building dating back to 1881 was previously a Ukrainian Catholic Church, and a school before it. |
| Westwood Mosque (formerly Oldham Muslim Centre) | | Oldham | 2008 | | Affiliated with East London Mosque and the Islamic Forum of Europe |
| Jamea Masjid | | Preston | 1984 | D | Recognised as the Central Masjid of Preston and also known for its 'castle-like' Islamic architectural design |

=== South East ===
| Name | Images | City | Year | Groups | Remarks |
|---|---|---|---|---|---|
| Al Medinah Mosque | | Brighton | 1991 | | |
| Brighton Mosque | | Brighton | Late 1970s | | Also known as Al-Quds Mosque, it was the first mosque in Brighton |
| Chesham Mosque | | Chesham | 2005 | Sunni | |
| Noor Mosque | | Crawley | 2014 | AMJ | A former church, converted into a mosque |
| Nasir Mosque | | Gillingham | 2014 | AMJ | The building, originally known as Nasir Hall, was home to the Lower Gillingham Liberal and Radical Club until the early 1970s. It has been used by the Ahmadiyya Muslim Community since 1975 |
| Mid Sussex Islamic Centre & Mosque | | Haywards Heath | 2010 | | Converted from a church hall in 2010 at a cost of over £250,000 |
| Madina Mosque | | Horsham | 2008 | D | Built in 1857 as the Jireh Independent Baptist Chapel |
| Mubarak Mosque | | Tilford | 2019 | AMJ | It currently serves as the mosque on the site of the international headquarters of the Ahmadiyya Muslim Community, known as Islamabad (English: Place of Islam). |
| Shah Jahan Mosque | | Woking | 1889 | Sunni | |

=== South West ===
| Name | Images | City | Year | Groups | Remarks |
|---|---|---|---|---|---|
| Albaseera Bristol Centre | | Bristol | | Sunni | Community centre and mosque in St Jude's; active community centre for local Somali population. |
| Assalraba Mosque and Islamic Centre | | Bristol | | Sunni | |
| Bournemouth Islamic Centre and Central Mosque | | Bournemouth | | | |
| Bristol Central Mosque | | Bristol | | Sunni | Located on Owen Street, Easton; one of the larger mosques in Bristol. |
| Bristol Jamia Mosque | | Bristol | 1968 | Sunni | First mosque in Bristol. Largest mosque in south-west England. |
| Easton Jamia Mosque | | Bristol | 2017 | Sunni | Unique transparent dome |
| Greenbank Masjid | | Bristol | 2008 | Sunni | Former Castle Green United Reformed Church |
| Hazrat Bilal Masjid | | Bristol | | Sunni | Mosque in St Werburghs (Sevier Street) |
| Exeter Mosque | | Exeter | 2011 | Sunni | |
| Plymouth Islamic Education Trust | | Plymouth | 2007 | | |

=== East of England ===
| Name | Images | City | Year | Groups | Remarks |
|---|---|---|---|---|---|
| Cambridge Central Mosque | | Cambridge | 2019 | U | |

=== East Midlands ===
| Name | Images | City | Year | Groups | Remarks |
|---|---|---|---|---|---|
| Baitul Ikram Mosque | | Leicester | 2016 | AMJ | |
| Baitul Hafeez Mosque | | Nottingham | 2018 | AMJ | |

=== West Midlands ===
| Name | Images | City | Year | Groups | Remarks |
|---|---|---|---|---|---|
| As-Salafi Mosque | | Birmingham | 2002 | Salafi | |
| Birmingham Central Mosque | | Birmingham | 1981 | D | |
| Darul Barakaat Mosque | | Birmingham | 2004 | AMJ | Capacity of 500 worshippers |
| Ghamkol Shariff Masjid | | Birmingham | 1992 | B | One of the largest mosques in Western Europe, with capacity of 5,000 worshippers |
| Green Lane Masjid | | Birmingham | 1970s | SA | Built 1893–1902 as a public library and baths |
| As-Salafi Mosque | | Birmingham | 2002 | SA | |
| Darul Jannah Masjid | | Birmingham | 2007 | SA | |
| Dudley Central Mosque | | Dudley | | | |
| Baitul Ghafoor Mosque | | Halesowen | 2012 | AMJ | Capacity of up to 600 worshippers |
| Baitul Ehsan Mosque | | Leamington Spa | 2008 | AMJ | The mosque was opened at the former James West Centre in Adelaide Road |
| Redditch Central Mosque | | Redditch | 1974 | | Capacity of 1,500 worshippers |
| Telford Central Mosque | | Telford | | D | Also known as the Shropshire Islamic Foundation |
| Baitul Muqeet Mosque | | Walsall | 2009 | AMJ | Inaugurated as a purpose-built mosque in 2018. |
| Baitul Ata Mosque | | Wolverhampton | 2012 | AMJ | A former church before being acquired and converted into a mosque |

=== Yorkshire and the Humber ===
| Name | Images | City | Year | Groups | Remarks |
|---|---|---|---|---|---|
| Al Mahdi Mosque | | Bradford | 2008 | AMJ | Holds 1,000 worshippers |
| Baitul Hamd Mosque | | Bradford | 1980 | AMJ | |
| Bradford Grand Mosque | | Bradford | 2013 | Sunni Muslim | Mosque nearing completion with a capacity of 8,000 worshippers and also known as Al-Jamia Suffa-Tul-Islam Grand Mosque |
| Markazi Masjid | | Dewsbury | 1982 | TJ | European headquarters of the Tablighi Jamaat movement |
| Baitus Samad | | Huddersfield | | AMJ | |
| Baitul Tauhid Mosque | | Huddersfield | 2008 | AMJ | This mosque was converted from a cricket club |
| Leeds Grand Mosque | | Leeds | 1994 | Sunni Muslim | |
| Makkah Masjid | | Leeds | | | |
| Stratford Street mosque | | Leeds | | Sunni Muslim | Officially the Omar Mosque or Masjid-e-Umar |
| Baitus Salaam Mosque | | Scunthorpe | 2002 (Note: Officially inaugurated in 2023.) | AMJ | Capacity of 250–300 worshippers |
| Baitul Afiyat Mosque | | Sheffield | 2008 | AMJ | |
| Madina Mosque | | Sheffield | 2006 | B | Also known as the Wolseley Road Mosque |
| York Mosque and Islamic Centre | | York | | JI | |

== Scotland ==
| Name | Images | City | Year | Groups | Remarks |
|---|---|---|---|---|---|
| Aberdeen Mosque and Islamic Centre | | Aberdeen | 1980 | Sunni Muslim | |
| Syed Shah Mustafa Jamee Mosque | | Aberdeen | | | |
| Al Maktoum Mosque | | Dundee | | | |
| Dundee Central Mosque | | Dundee | 2000 | D | Also known as the Jamia Mosque |
| Jame Masjid Bilal | | Dundee | | | |
| Masjid Tajdare Madina | | Dundee | | | |
| Edinburgh Central Mosque | | Edinburgh | 1998 | W | Officially known as the King Fahd Mosque and Islamic Centre of Edinburgh |
| Falkirk Islamic Centre | | Falkirk | 1992 | Sunni Muslim | |
| Al-Furqan Mosque | | Glasgow | | | |
| Bait Ur Rahman Mosque | | Glasgow | 1984 | AMJ | Designed by Sinclair and Ballantine and completed in 1904, as Masonic Halls |
| Glasgow Central Mosque | | Glasgow | 1983 | D | |
| Hillview Islamic & Education Centre | | Glasgow | 2021 | Sunni Muslim | Also known as Hillview Masjid |
| Masjid Noor | | Glasgow | 1998 | TJ/D | Also known as Glasgow Markaz |
| Zia-ul-Quran Mosque | | Glasgow | 2000 | B | Also known as Kenmure St Masjid |
| Renton Muslim Education Centre | | Renton | 2007 | | Former municipal library and Category C listed building |

== Wales ==
| Name | Images | City | Year | Groups | Remarks |
|---|---|---|---|---|---|
| Al-Manar Centre | | Cardiff | 1992 | SA | Formerly known as Masjid-e-Abu Hurairah |
| Baitur Raheem Mosque | | Cardiff | | AMJ | |
| Shah Jalal Mosque | | Cardiff | 1899 | SU | |
| Masjid-e-Zawiyah | | | | | |
| Sadiq Mosque | | Rhyl | | AMJ | Formerly the 'Salem Chapel' |
| Swansea Mosque | | Swansea | 1980s | SA | Formerly St. Andrew's Presbyterian Church |

== Group ==
| AMJ | Ahmadiyya Muslim Community |
| B | Barelvi |
| D | Deobandi |
| JI | Jamaat-e-Islami |
| SA | Salafi |
| SU | Sufi Islam |
| UKTICC | UK Turkish Islamic Cultural Centre |
| UKTIA | United Kingdom Turkish Islamic Association |
| TJ | Tablighi Jamaat |
| W | Wahhabism |
| U | Unknown |

== See also ==
- Islam in the United Kingdom
- Islamic schools and branches
- List of mosques in Europe
