= Central Mosque =

Central Mosque (Arabic Al-masjid al-markazi المسجد المركزي) may refer to:

- Markazi Masjid, Dewsbury
- Markazi Masjid, London Borough of Tower Hamlets
- Central Mosque Wembley
- Central Mosque of Lisbon
- Bournemouth Islamic Centre and Central Mosque
