= YMO =

YMO may refer to:

- Yellow Magic Orchestra, the Japanese synthpop band
  - Yellow Magic Orchestra (album), the band's debut album
- Moosonee Airport, the IATA airport code
- Young Men Organization, an auxiliary organization of The Church of Jesus Christ of Latter-day Saints for adolescent boys
- Young Muslim Organisation, in the United Kingdom
- Yugoslav Muslim Organization
- Yangum language, by ISO 639 code
