= Banbury Mosque =

Sunni Islam masjid in Banbury, Oxfordshire, England, United Kingdom

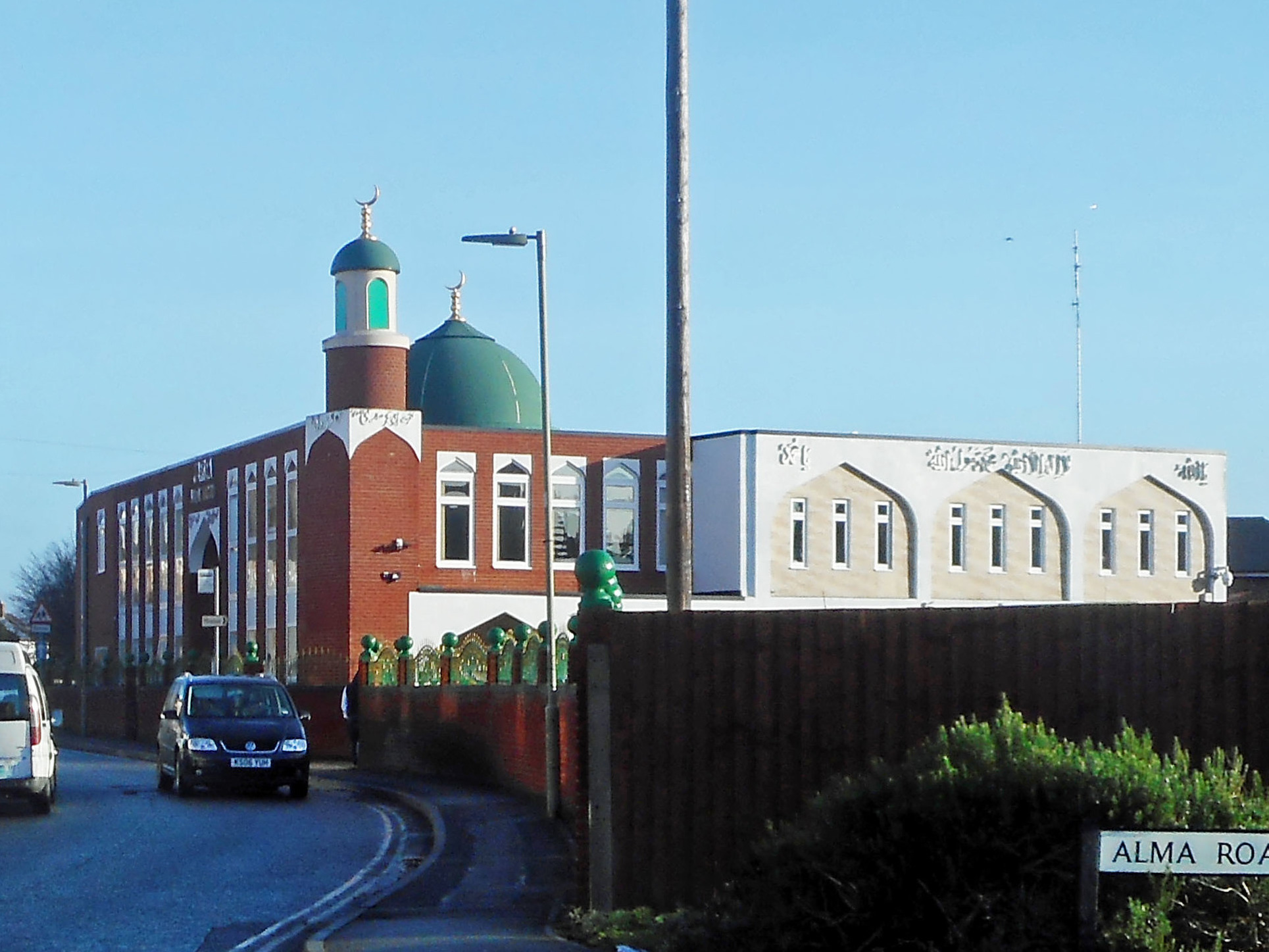
- The mosque in 2018

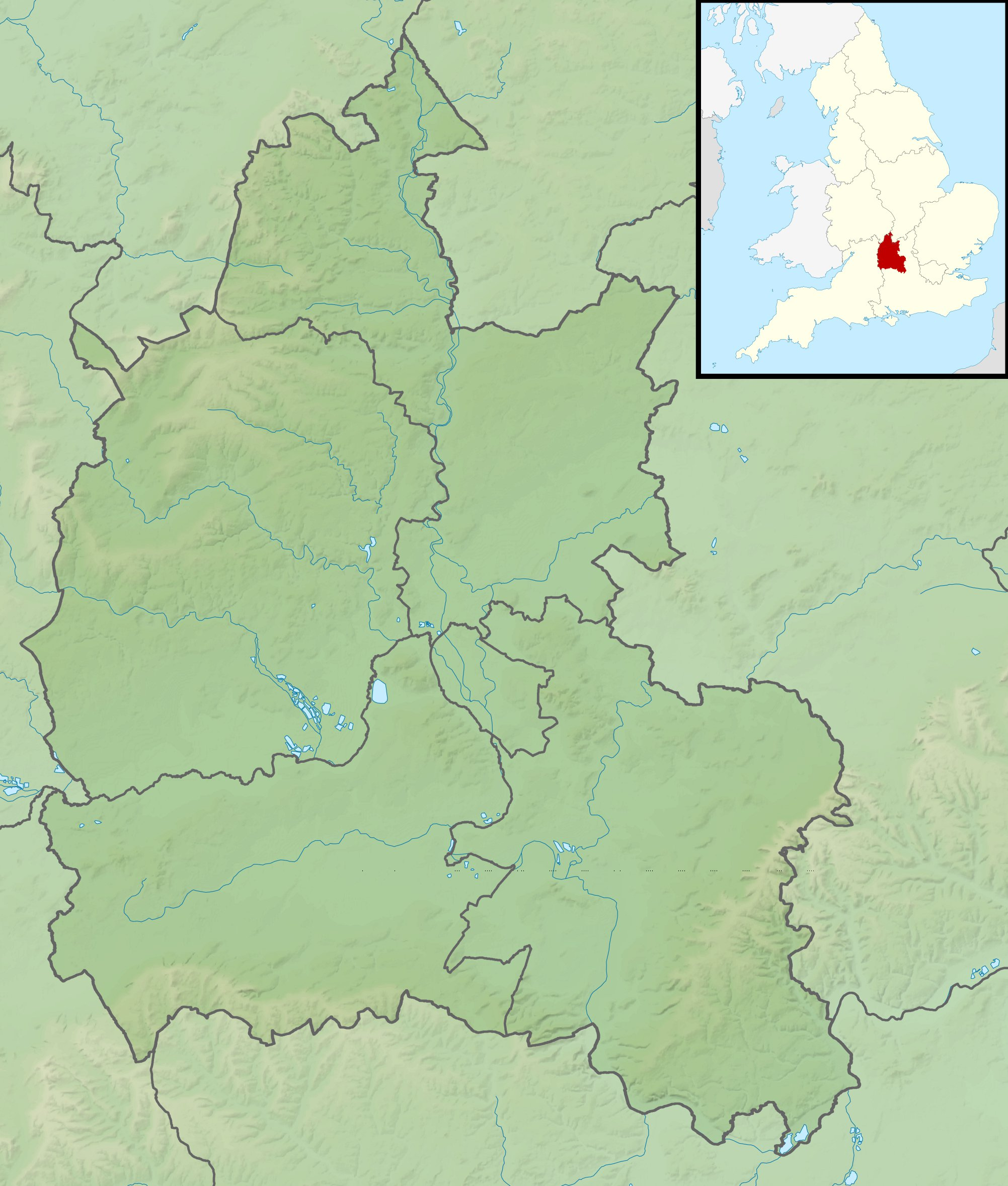
- Location of the mosque in Oxfordshire

Religion
- Affiliation: Islam
- Branch/tradition: Sunni
- Ecclesiastical or organizational status: Mosque
- Status: Active

Location
- Location: Oxfordshire, England
- Country: United Kingdom
- Interactive map of Banbury Mosque
- Coordinates: 52°03′42″N 1°19′30″W

Architecture
- Type: Mosque architecture
- Established: c. 2000s

Specifications
- Dome: 1772727672
- Minaret: One

Website
- banburymadnimasjid.com

The Banbury Mosque, officially the Banbury Madni Masjid, is a Sunni Islam mosque, located in Banbury, Oxfordshire, England, in the United Kingdom.

== History ==
In September 2008, the mosque was given permission to expand its size to allow women to pray separately, however the expansion received some criticism from local residents.

Banbury Madni Mosque is a beacon mosque at the forefront of many community initiatives such as, first Mosque in the Uk to house a community fridge and food bank which is used by 99% white Caucasusian families, it also hosts hot meals for the homeless and a warm space for the elderly and most vulnerable many other community initiatives a must to visit.

The Ash-Shifa School girls' Islamic school is located within the grounds of Banbury Mosque. The mosque was newly rebuilt in 2012 by leading small-medium construction company Civic Construction Limited directed by Mr Wajid Ali.

== See also ==
- History of Islam in the United Kingdom
- List of mosques in the United Kingdom
