= Shropshire Islamic Foundation =

Religious organisation in Shropshire, England

The Shropshire Islamic Foundation's Telford Central Mosque sign on their original building at 41 Tan Bank.

The Shropshire Islamic Foundation (SIF) is located in the Telford and Wrekin district of Shropshire, England.

The foundation owns, operates from, and manages the Telford Islamic Academy, at 88–90 King Street, Wellington, Telford and the Telford Central Mosque at 41 Tan Bank, Wellington, Telford.

The Mosque, operates under the Hanafi school of law as a Deobandi mosque providing Islamic education to children of all ages. This is the only deoband mosque in Telford, shropshire.

The foundation is a registered charity – registration number 1112127, with the trustees being Dr. Mohammed Mujahid Hussain Qureshi – Chairman of trustees, Mr. Shah Sawar Bhatti and Dr. Shaukat Ali

Shropshire has three other Mosques, the Jamia Masjid Gousia, aka the 'Regent Street Mosque', a Sufi – Qadiria jilania trust Sufi, Barelvi themed Mosque in Wellington. and Faizaneramdan Telford

== History ==
The Shropshire Islamic Foundation's Telford Central Mosque original building at 41 Tan Bank.

In 2005, the foundation bought the disused Territorial Army building in Wellington, Telford, located at 88–90 King Street and in 2007 made a planning application (W2007/0667) to convert it to a mosque, operating as the new headquarters of the Shropshire Islamic Foundation.

Dr Abdul Bari is the Leader of the Muslim Council of Britain (MCB) who gave the reason for the need for converting a much larger Mosque when stating: "In Shropshire the Muslim population is growing: it is quickly outgrowing the county's two Mosques and there are plans a-foot to transform Wellington's old Territorial Army centre into a new Mosque that would house 800 worshippers."

Community views were sought over TA mosque plan and the Mosque leaders, through the local media, kept the community updated of their plans.

On 10 August 2007, the Shropshire Islamic Foundation were informed that their application was accepted by Telford & Wrekin Council, but would cost £1.5m to convert.

== Telford Central Mosque ==
The Shropshire Islamic Foundation's Telford Central Mosque new building at 88 King Street.

The £1.2 million refurbishment will take the building back to its former state when it opened in 1953. Mr.Saleh Laher the previous chairman of the trustees had said that it will be "redesigned so the 1953 fascia would be seen and the 'beautiful' courtyard with wooden beams would be the central prayer room" and would be restored "to its original condition."

It has been said by Saleh Laher, a member of the foundation, that the new mosque "would not have a dome or a minaret" and that it would look "like a Northern African mosque with a castle frontage" and would "be created out of the four existing buildings in the complex."

=== Facilities ===
The renewed premises will allow the Shropshire Islamic Foundation to cater for gatherings of approximately 1,000 people. It will be the only mosque in Shropshire where women can pray and it will be the biggest in the county.

The Shropshire Star newspaper reported that "The plans also include a flat for the imam, two shops for religious goods and community rooms, and converting part of the building into a mortuary to facilitate the traditional preparation of bodies for an Islamic burial."

There will be separate prayer facilities for women, a room for funerals, a community hall and classes for children to learn Arabic and Qur'an reading.

== See also ==
- Islam in the United Kingdom
- Islamic schools and branches
- List of mosques in the United Kingdom
