= Muslim Safety Forum =

The Muslim Safety Forum (MSF) is a British-based organisation set up to challenge the "unfair focus on the Muslim community when it came to policing activities and enforcement of anti-terror policing legislation". It was founded in 2001 and comprised a number of Muslim organisations, including the Muslim Council of Britain (MCB), the Islamic Human Rights Commission (IHRC), the Islamic Forum Europe (IFE), and others. It was described in 2010 by the Human Rights Watch (HRW) as "a non-governmental umbrella group that represents over 40 Muslim organisations in the UK". The MSF has been described by Shiraz Maher in The Jewish Chronicle as "an extremist group dominated by Islamists who support Hamas".

The group had many meetings at New Scotland Yard (the headquarters of the Metropolitan Police Service) to discuss community safety, counter-terrorism and community policing measures. From 2001 until 2011, the MSF held regular meetings between senior police officers and representatives of Islamic institutions and Muslim community organisations. It was one of a number of Metropolitan Police measures introduced following the September 11 attacks as one of many efforts by the service to engage in dialogue with the British Muslim community to tackle Islamophobia and anti-Muslim hate crimes.

In 2006 Azad Ali was its chairman. In December 2006, Ali signed an agreement with Sir Ian Blair, then Commissioner of the Metropolitan Police, which stated: "The Commissioner will recognise the MSF as the principal body in relation to Muslim community safety and security." By this agreement, Sir Ian or his deputy were to meet Ali and the MSF at least twice a year and to hold monthly meetings with the MSF at "New Scotland Yard or other suitable premises". Met chiefs, including counter-terrorist commanders, were to attend the MSF's own meetings "whenever possible". The Met were to "use the MSF as a consultation body to help formulate policy or practice" and "progress an annual plan of work through agreed priority workstreams", jointly led by Met and MSF representatives. Ali was the MSF lead on counter-terrorism.

In the wake of the controversy about the abortive Forest Gate raid in summer 2006, the Met also agreed to set up a four-man panel with the MSF, with Ali as one of the panel, to offer the Muslim community to scrutinise police intelligence.

Ali left the post of chairman in 2008, then, having been appointed the MSF treasurer, resigned from MSF in 2009 after publicity over his appraisal of Abdullah Yusuf Azzam, mentor of Osama bin Laden, and approval on his blog of Azzam's son saying that as a Muslim he is religiously obliged to kill British soldiers in Iraq. However he remained a trustee and director of the MSF. In July 2010 he was reinstated as MSF's chairman.

In 2012, the group received an increase in funding in the lead-up to the 2012 Olympic Games in London.
