= Azad Ali =

British Muslim activist

Azad Ali is a British Muslim activist, civil servant for the HM Treasury, and a spokesman for the Islamic Forum of Europe. He variously served as the founding chair of the Muslim Safety Forum, as Vice-Chair of Unite Against Fascism (UAF), and as the director of engagement at Muslim Engagement and Development (MEND).

== Islamic Forum of Europe ==
Ali was community affairs co-ordinator for the Islamic Forum of Europe, an offshoot of the Islamist group Jamaat-e-Islami. According to fascism and anti-fascism specialist Nigel Copsey of Teesside University, this brought Unite Against Fascism into disrepute as a group unconcerned with Islamic extremism.

== Muslim Safety Forum ==
Ali was founding-chairman of the Muslim Safety Forum from 2006. While in that post, he became a "key member" of the Metropolitan Police's 'Communities Together Strategic Group', chaired by Deputy Assistant Commissioner Rose Fitzpatrick, which met fortnightly to "oversee and review community reassurance and engagement measures" involving the Muslim community. Ali was also a member of the Kratos Review Group, to examine the Met's response to suicide bombings.

Ali left the post of chairman in 2008, then resigned entirely from MSF in 2009 after publicity over his comments. In July 2010, he was reinstated as MSF's chairman.

== Controversial views ==
According to Charles Moore, former editor of The Daily Telegraph, in 2008 Ali is a "leading Muslim networker" in Britain who described Al-Qaeda terrorist Anwar al-Awlaki in 2008 as, "one of my favourite speakers...," and "blogged in favour of a man who argued that it was a duty under jihad to kill British and American troops in Iraq." Ali "dissociated himself from al Awlaki" in the wake of the 2009 Fort Hood shooting. Ali has denied that the 2008 Mumbai attacks, and the 2017 Westminster attack were terrorism.

In 2009, Ali was suspended as a civil servant in the Treasury after he praised Abdullah Yusuf Azzam, Osama bin Laden's key mentor, and wrote approvingly on his blog of Azzam's son saying that as a Muslim he is religiously obliged to kill British soldiers in Iraq. In the blog he also criticised the British Foreign Secretary David Miliband after the minister had condemned the Palestinian Muslim militant organisation Hamas for encouraging attacks on Israeli civilians. The exposé was by The Mail on Sunday, whom Ali unsuccessfully sued in 2010.

When a documentary on the Islamic Forum of Europe was made by the Channel 4 programme Dispatches in 2010, an undercover reporter filmed Ali saying "Democracy, if it means at the expense of not implementing the sharia, of course no one agrees with that." Ali later attacked the undercover reporter on the IFE's official radio station, saying: "We've got a picture of you and a lot more than you thought we had. We've tracked you down to different places. And if people are gonna turn what I've just said into a threat, that's their fault, innit?" Andrew Gilligan, who produced the documentary, has labelled Ali as an "Islamic fascist".
