= Young Muslim Organisation =

Islamic organization based in England, United Kingdom

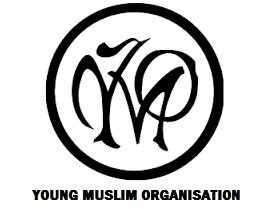
- Founder: Muhammad Abdul Bari
- Headquarters: East London Mosque; Oldham Muslim Centre (now Westwood Mosque)
- Coordinates: 51.5176°N 0.0656°W
- Affiliations: Muslim Council of Britain

Young Muslim Organisation (YMO) is an Islamic youth-oriented initiative based in England.

It was established mainly by the British Bangladeshi youths in East London during the period of racial attacks in Tower Hamlets in 1978. The group first met in London in October 1978 to bring together what its website describes as "a dynamic band of youth who would respond to the challenges faced by their community with deep faith, true commitment and a positive and comprehensive work plan". Its dawah work includes School Link Project (SLP), College Link Project (CLP) and University Link Project (ULP) which organise activities such as lectures, seminars, awards ceremonies, camps, and sports activities.

Authors such as Brian Belton and Sadick Hamid describe the group as catering for and run by young people of Bangladeshi origin. It is a competitor to another Islamic youth work group, The Young Muslims UK. The two groups have minimal differences but the Young Muslim Organisation has a more conservative interpretation of sharia and Islamic jurisprudence.

According to a former activist, Ed Husain, YMO was founded by supporters of Abul A'la Maududi and Hassan al-Banna, and its early members were encouraged to follow their works. Husain describes the organisation as being structured in a hierarchy with ordinary members at the bottom, followed by pillar members, and the National Executive Committee of the YMO at the top. Ordinary members become pillar after years of activities and proving one's loyalty when they take a vow and swearing allegiance to the leadership. At least when Husain was a member in the early 1990s, East London Mosque was a YMO stronghold from which the organisation was working to spread. Members were expected to an account of their daily activities (how many hours they spent on prayer, reciting the Quran, reading hadith and other Islamic books, etc.) reporting their achievements at the YMO weekly meeting.
