= Totterdown =

Area of Bristol, England

Coordinates: 51.442270°N 2.578212°W

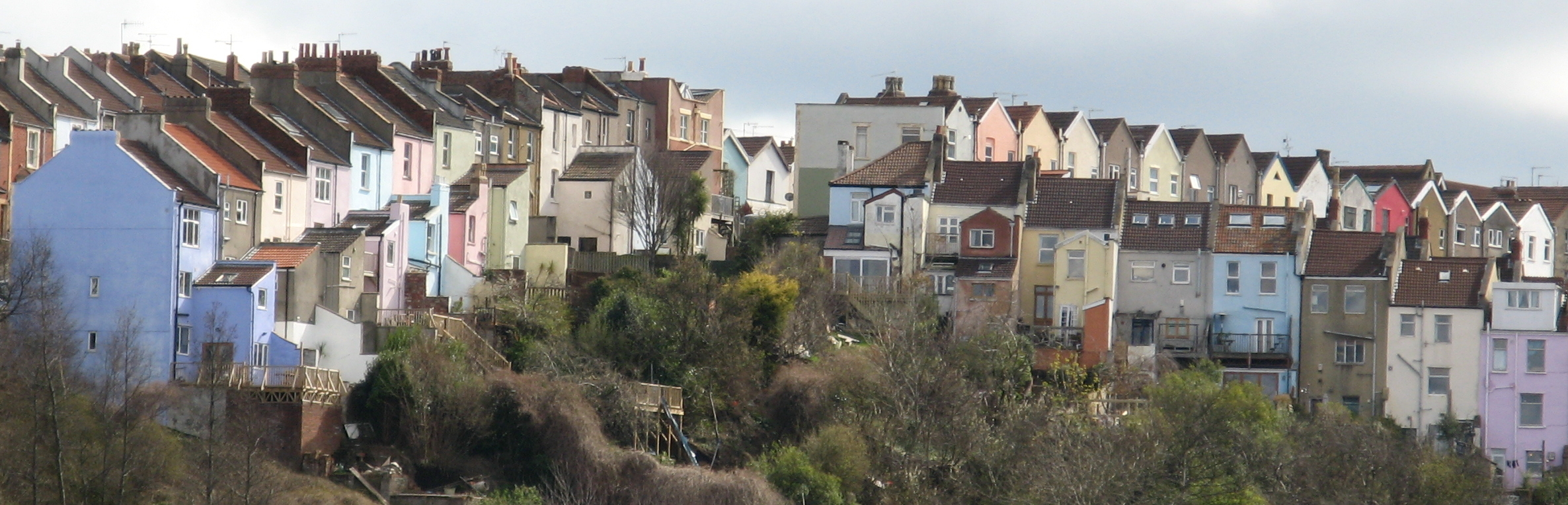
- Totterdown houses

- Location within Bristol
- OS grid reference: ST607712
- Unitary authority: Bristol
- Ceremonial county: Bristol
- Region: South West
- Country: England
- Sovereign state: United Kingdom
- Post town: BRISTOL
- Postcode district: BS3, BS4
- Dialling code: 0117
- Police: Avon and Somerset
- Fire: Avon
- Ambulance: South Western
- UK Parliament: Bristol South

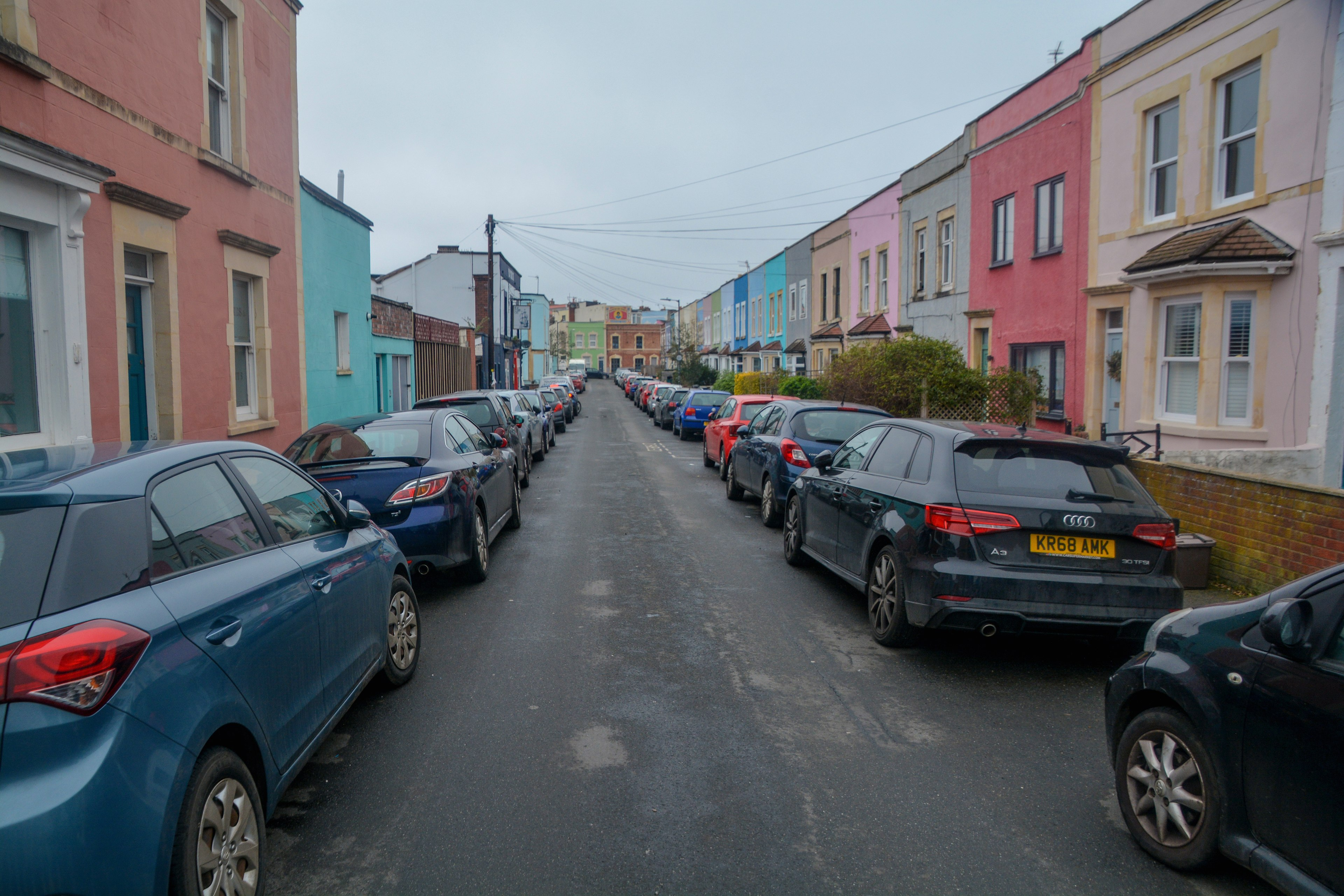
A view of the colourful houses of Henry Street in Totterdown

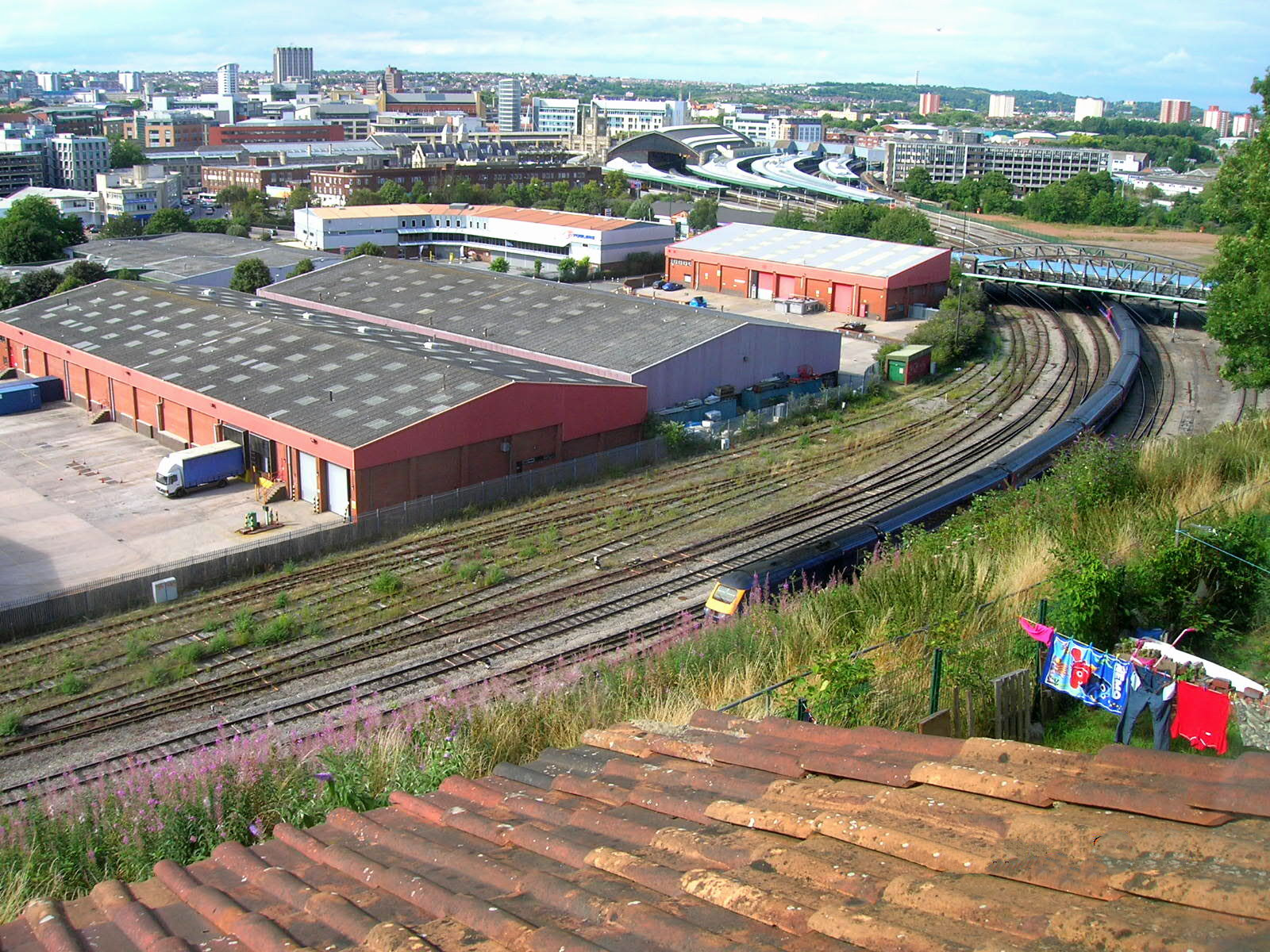
Temple Meads rail station approaches from Richmond Street, edge of Totterdown, with the Bath Road bridge over the rail lines to the right of image, the Fowlers motorcycle store (L-shaped building) and modern industrial units in foreground

Totterdown is an inner-suburb of Bristol, England, situated just south of the River Avon and to the south-east of Temple Meads railway station and the city centre.

It rises relatively steeply from the river bank to a largely terraced Victorian housing area which is notable for its painted homes - often in bright colours - that can be seen from some distance.

There is a tight network of extremely steep roads in Upper Totterdown, of which Vale Street, although very short, is alleged to be the steepest residential road in England.

== History ==
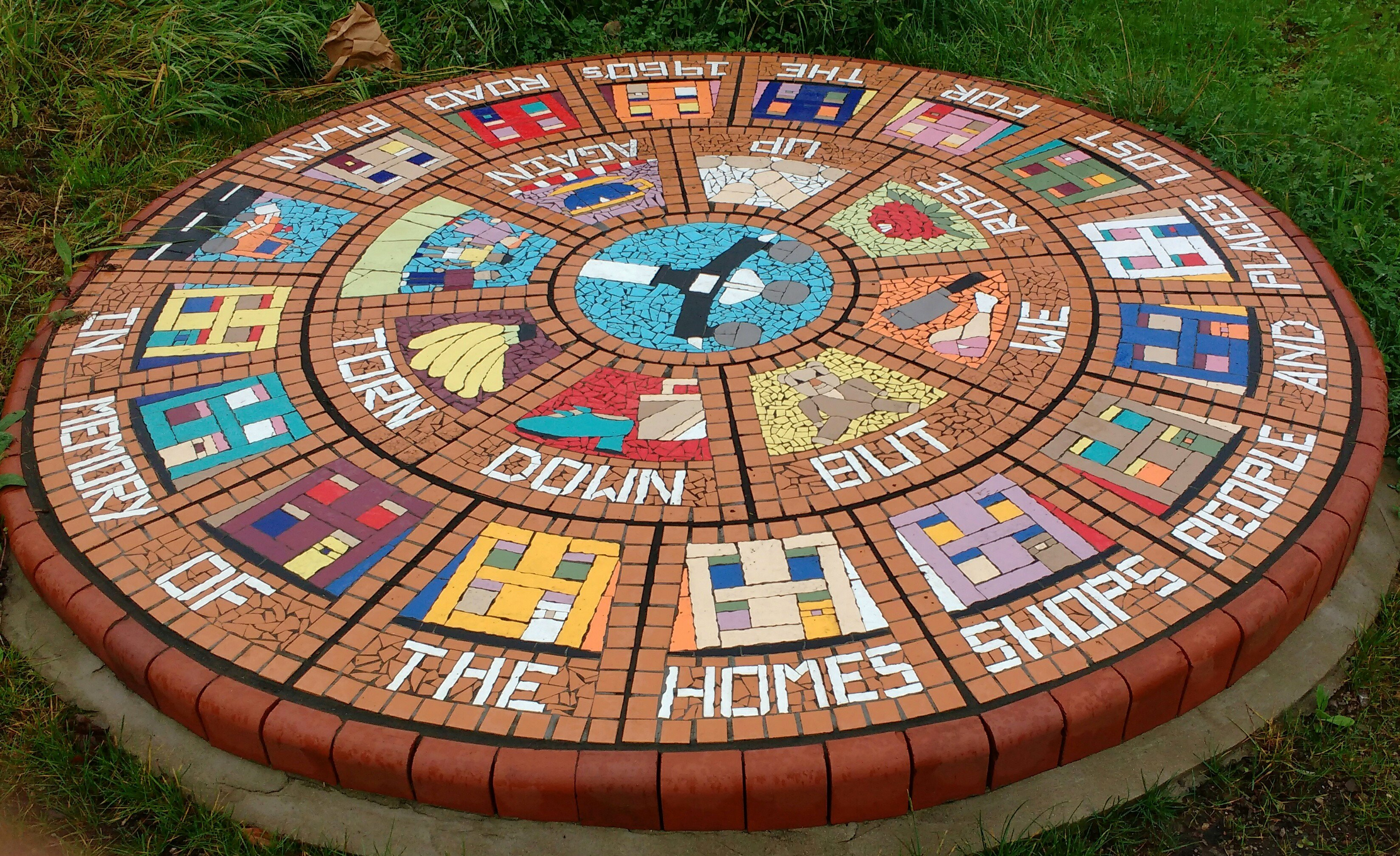
Mosaic monument commemorating the removal of the houses for the 1970s Outer Circuit.

Built in the mid to late 19th century to house workers for the nearby railway industry, in the 1970s many of the Victorian buildings were demolished in anticipation of constructing a major junction of the Outer Circuit Road, although ultimately this section of the road was never built.

Totterdown has more recently become a popular area for the younger generation taking up work in the city centre. In 2016 it was named "fifth hippest place to live in the UK" by The Times newspaper.

== Food and drink ==
Totterdown has several local pubs some of which attract a younger clientele with DJ nights. Pubs offering music include The Oxford, Shakespeare, New Found Out and the Thunderbolt (previously known as "The Turnpike"). The Oxford has regular live music including "open mike" events and the Thunderbolt books local and national bands. There was another pub (formerly) the Cumberland which is known now as the Star and Dove. It closed in May 2017 for a short period however, reopened in December 2017.

Totterdown has a growing number of popular restaurants. The Old Bank on Wells Road hosts an award winning restaurant.

== Local facilities ==
The area also has a Tesco Express, a garage (repairs and MOTs), a convenience store, a chemist, an optician, a wine shop, a fruit and veg shop, various hairdressers and beauty treatment rooms as well as a doctors surgery, and is well served by buses into town and across to Clifton. There is also the Bristol Jamia Mosque close to Victoria Park as well as thriving Methodist, CofE and Baptist churches. In 2015, an artisanal bakery opened for business opposite the Oxford Pub on Oxford Street, replacing a long since closed Chinese restaurant. A number of new independent businesses have also opened along the Wells Road in recent times, including several cafes and a bar, a craft store, a vintage shop and a florist.

== Children ==
Totterdown is popular with young families. There are daily toddler groups at Totterdown Baptist Church. Victoria Park has a good newish play area at the top of the park, as well as tennis courts, basketball courts, football pitches, skatepark, and more. School Road Park has undergone a transformation and contains challenging play equipment for younger children including swings, slides, mini trampolines, and a sandpit. Perrett's Park is a natural amphitheatre with benches around the top along Bayham Road and Sylvia Avenue: a place where the balloon ascent can be seen during the summer Balloon Fiesta. It also has a play area suitable for the under 10s.

== Art ==
The Totterdown Art trail Frontroom invites visitors into the houses of artists in this area of Bristol to view a large range of local artwork.

== Aldebury ==
Totterdown is believed to be the site of the Aldebury Iron Age hill fort behind Bellevue; however, the area is now built over.

== Gallery ==
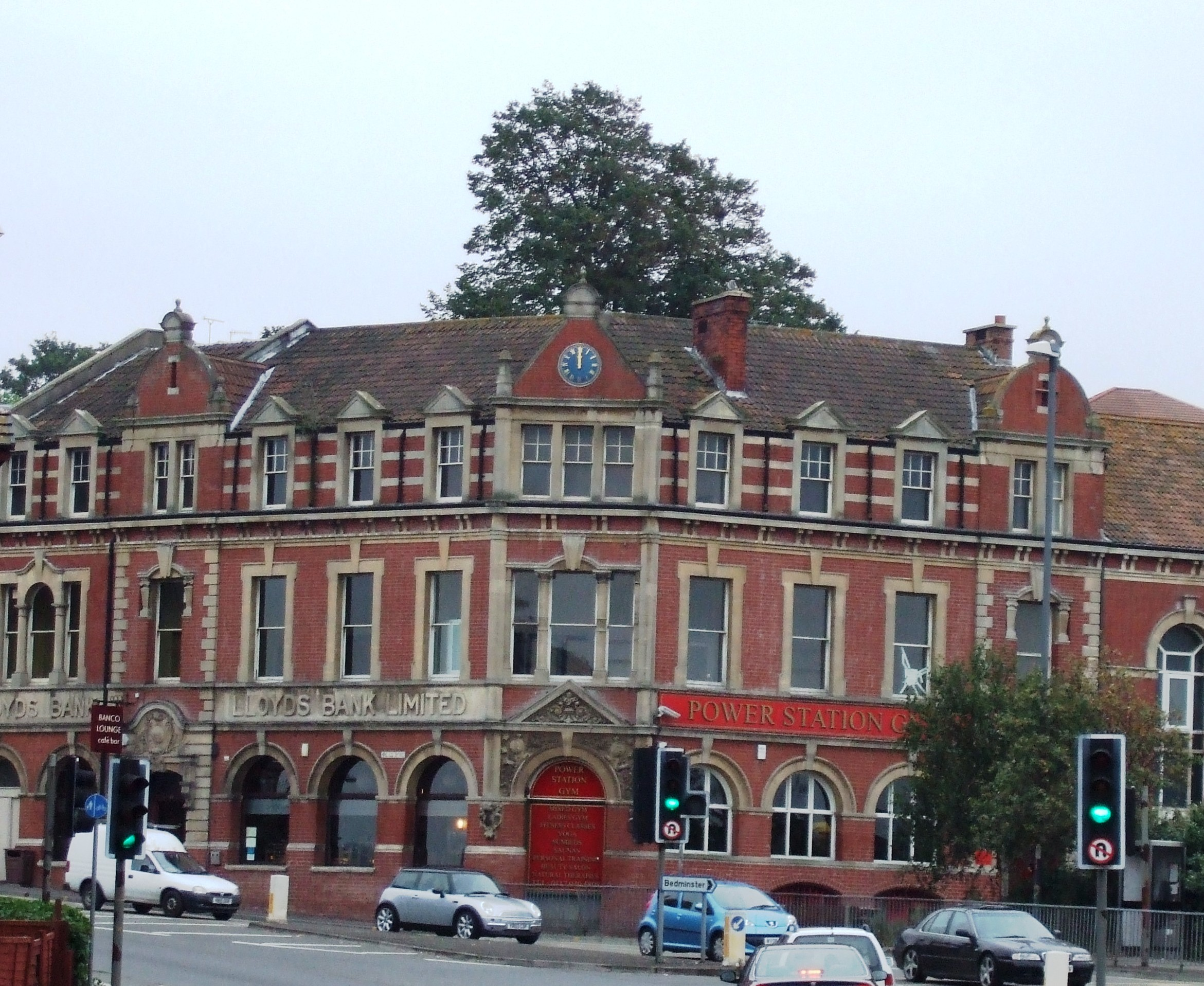
Old Bank and Power Station Gym

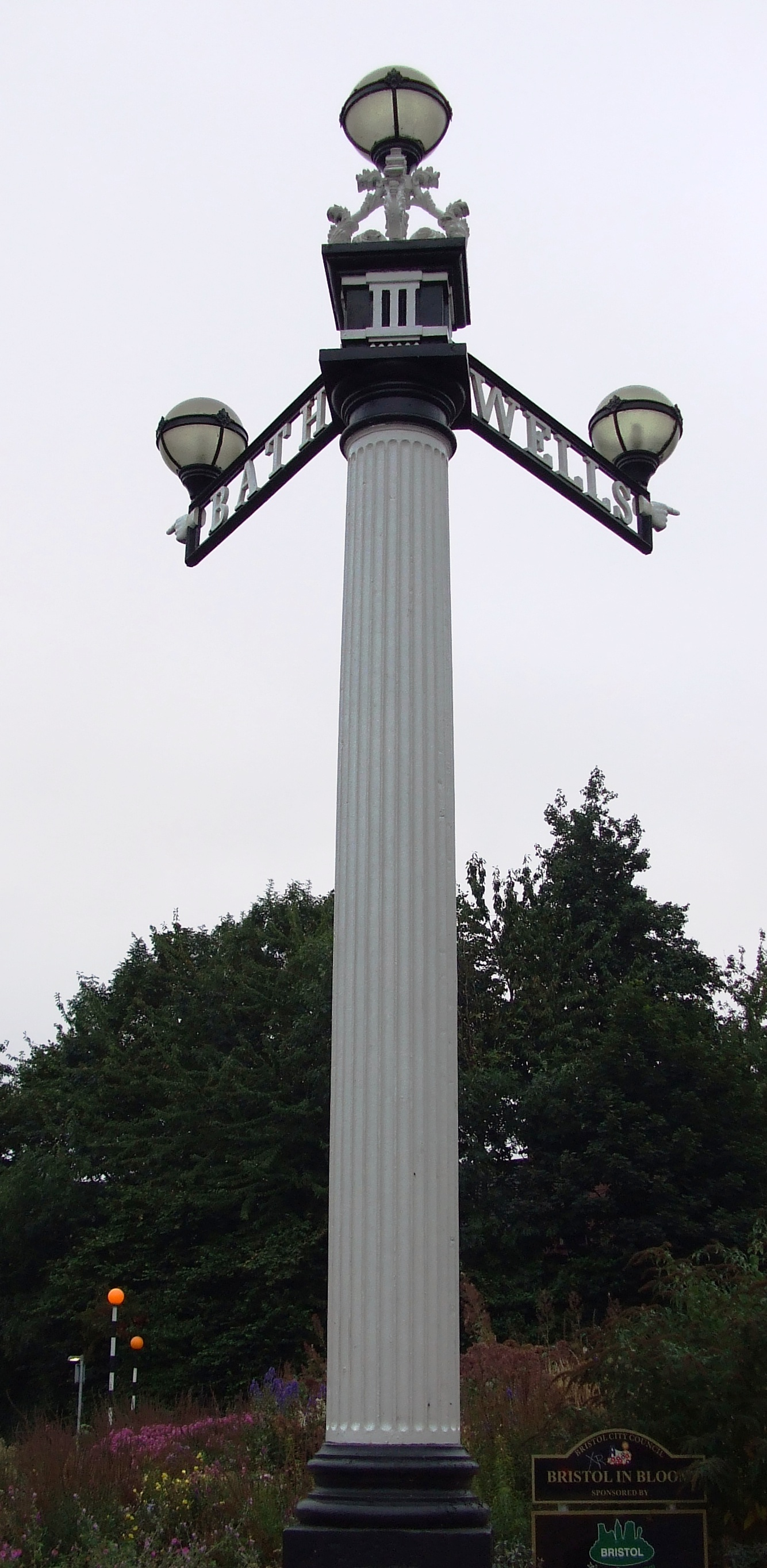
Three Lamps sign
