= Madina Mosque, Sheffield =

Mosque in South Yorkshire, England

Madina Mosque
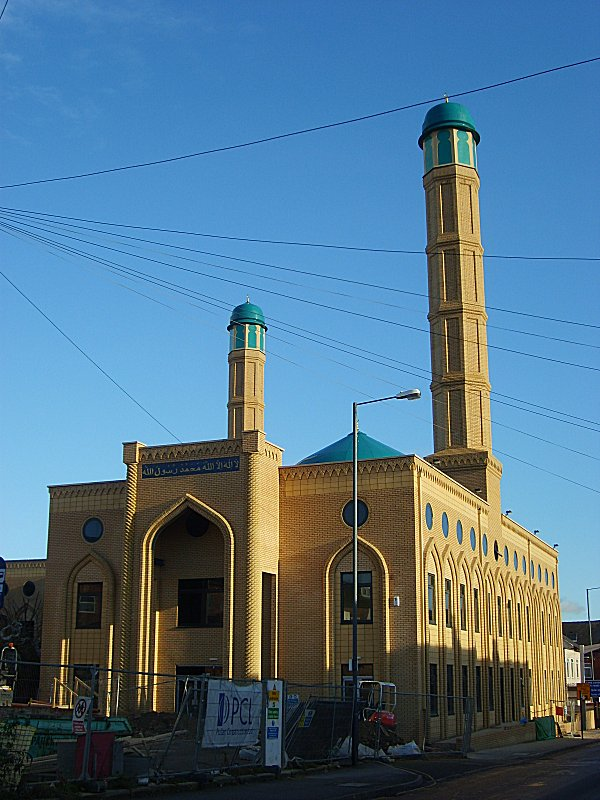
- The mosque in 2006

- Location of the mosque in Sheffield

Religion
- Affiliation: Barelvi
- Ecclesiastical or organisational status: Mosque
- Ownership: Sheffield Islamic Centre Madina Masjid Trust
- Status: Active

Location
- Location: Heeley, South Yorkshire
- Country: England
- Coordinates: 53°21′51″N 1°28′24″W

Architecture
- Type: Mosque architecture
- Completed: 2006
- Construction cost: £5,000,000

Specifications
- Capacity: 2,300 worshippers
- Dome: 1
- Minaret: 2
- Materials: Brick

Website
- madinamasjid.org.uk

The Madina Mosque, also known as the Madina Masjid and the Wolseley Road Mosque, is the first purpose-built mosque in Sheffield, South Yorkshire, England.

== Overview ==
After some problems with funding, the project was completed in October 2006. Users of the mosque raised several million pounds to pay for the new mosque and Islamic centre which includes 19 rooms and two large halls, a library and a day centre. The project is estimated to have cost £5 million. The mosque was built on Glover Road, Sheffield, and intended to serve the Muslim populations of Nether Edge and Sharrow. The mosque has a capacity of 2,300 male and female worshippers.

The organization, 'Muslims in Britain' classify the masjid as, "Sufi - Barelvi".

In 2008 the BBC reported that the centre had classrooms and a planned daycare centre for the elderly, and that it would host inter-faith events.

== See also ==
- Islam in the United Kingdom
- List of mosques in the United Kingdom
