= Dudley Central Mosque =

Mosque in Dudley, West Midlands, England, United Kingdom

Dudley Central Mosque and Muslim Community Centre
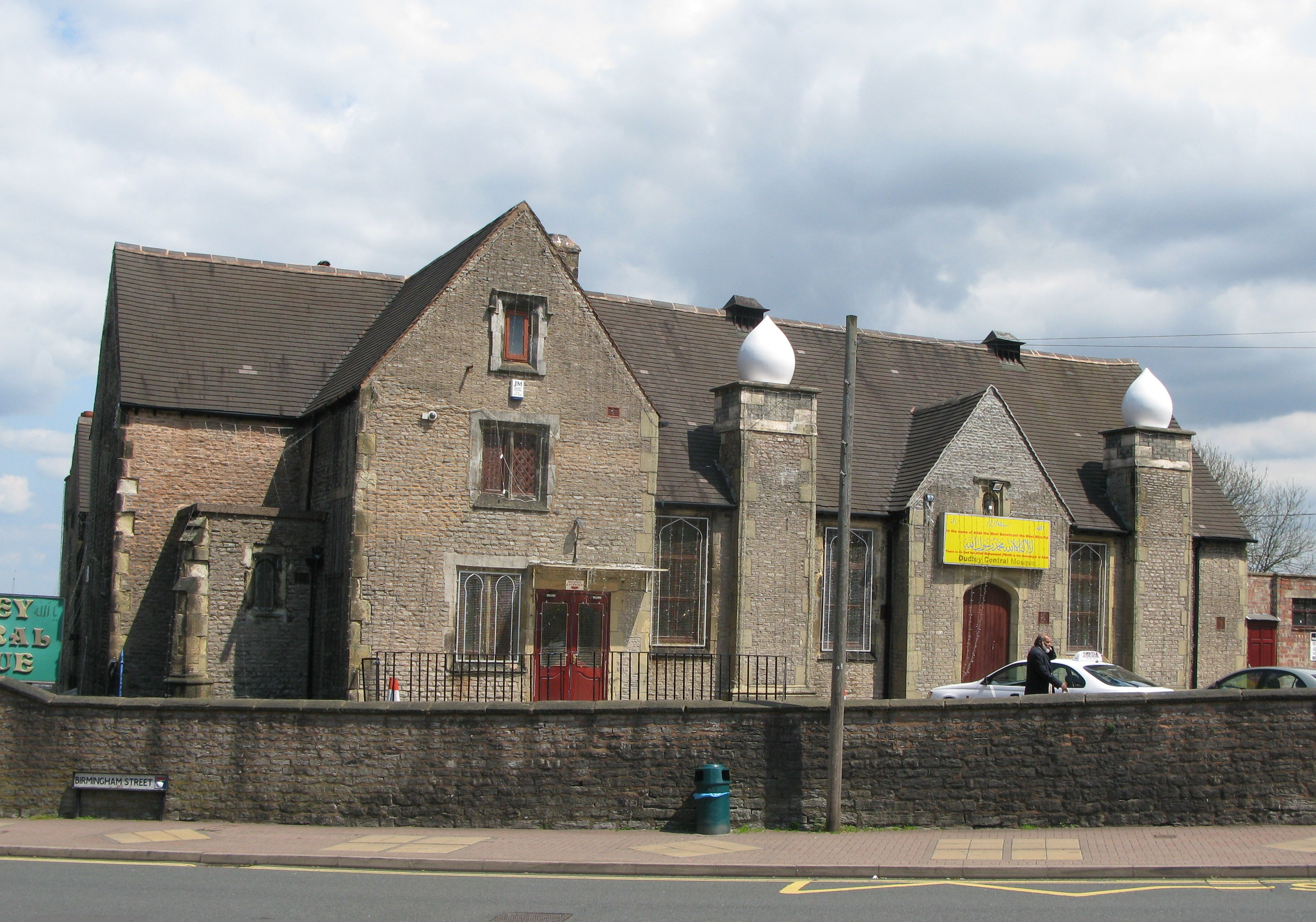

Location
- Location: Dudley, West Midlands, England, United Kingdom
- Interactive map of Dudley Central Mosque and Muslim Community Centre
- Coordinates: 52.5124°N 2.0788°W

Architecture
- Type: Mosque

Dudley Central Mosque and Muslim Community Centre is a mosque and community centre in Dudley, England. It was established to advance the religion of Islam for the benefit of public by holding of the Congregational Prayers and religious lectures according to the Sunni Sect of Islam (Ahle Sunnat Wal Jammat, Barelvi School of thought).

== Expansion plan ==
In 2003, plans were unveiled for the construction of a new mosque (which become known as the "Super Mosque" locally) in Hall Street, a site that had been leased by Dudley Council to the Dudley Muslim Association, in exchange for a site impacted by a proposed bypass. The mosque proposals were scrapped in May 2010, after a long dispute, in favour of an expansion to the existing Dudley Central Mosque in Castle Hill, an appeal was made by the Dudley Muslim Association against the High Court ruling, and failed in February 2014.

== Activities ==
Open day was declared in 2015 to invited residents of all faiths to join them on 28 February 2015, to take a tour of Mosque and were invited to ask questions about Islam and find out more about plans for the proposed new mosque.

== See also ==
- List of mosques in the United Kingdom
- Islam in England
