= Chesham Mosque =

Mosque in Buckinghamshire, England

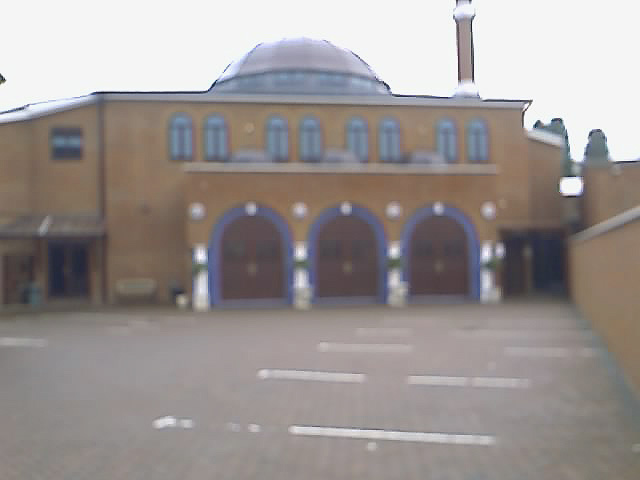

Religion
- Affiliation: Sufi - Bareilvi

Location
- Location: Bellingdon Road Chesham, England, United Kingdom
- Interactive map of Chesham Mosque
- Coordinates: 51.71238°N 0.61455°W

Architecture
- Type: Mosque
- Style: Modern
- Completed: 2005
- Construction cost: £1.6 million

Specifications
- Capacity: 700 (all genders)
- Minaret: 1

Website
- www.cheshammosque.org.uk

Chesham Mosque is a mosque in Chesham, Buckinghamshire, England. It was constructed between 2004 and 2005, to replace the former mosque, which was located in two converted houses on Bellingdon Road. The total cost of the construction work was £1.6 million, all of which was raised from donations and collections.

The organization, 'Muslims in Britain' classify the Chesham Mosque as, Sufi - Bareilvi.

== History ==
The first mosque in Chesham was established in 1970. In 1979, the mosque moved to two converted houses at 161–163 Bellingdon Road, to be closer to the majority of Chesham's Muslim households. The maximum capacity for this mosque was 200. By the late 1990s, the Muslim population in Chesham had grown to 1500, prompting a search for a site to construct a new mosque. Fundraising for the mosque began during Ramadan in December 1998. All of the costs of construction were raised from donations and door-to-door collections.

The actual building work began in February 2004, and the mosque was officially opened in August 2005. The final cost of construction was £1.6 million. The old mosque building is used as a meeting and function facility.

== Facilities ==
The main prayer hall of the mosque has a capacity for 500, with an additional prayer hall for women having a capacity for 200. There are also wudu facilities and a Quran study room.

== See also ==
- Islam in the United Kingdom
- Islamic schools and branches
- Islamism
- List of mosques
- List of mosques in the United Kingdom
