= Madina Masjid & Islamic Centre =

Mosque in Oldham, United Kingdom

- মদিনা মসজিদ ও ইসলামিক সেন্টার
- Masjid logo

- Location within Greater Manchester

Religion
- Affiliation: Sunni Islam
- Leadership: Imam: Abu Saleh Muhammad Mamun Chairman: Md Abdul Haye; Vice chairman: Dara Miah; General Secretary: Abid Miah; Treasurer: Abdul Shohid; Mutawalli: Rajuk Miah; Assistant Mutawalli: Amir Uddin
- Year consecrated: 1987
- Religious features: Mihrab (niche), Mimbar (pulpit), domes

Location
- Location: Stansfield Street, Oldham, Greater Manchester
- Country: United Kingdom
- Coordinates: 53.5496617°N 2.1219905°W

Architecture
- Architect: Alexander Banks
- General contractor: Whitworth Whitaker
- Groundbreaking: 1881

Specifications
- Capacity: 1000
- Interior area: 610 square meters
- Site area: 3556 square meters

Website
- https://mmic.org.uk

Madina Masjid & Islamic Centre (MMIC) (Bengali: মদিনা মসজিদ ও ইসলামিক সেন্টার) is a mosque in Oldham, United Kingdom. It was established in 1987, making it one of the oldest mosques in the area.

== Facilities ==
=== Prayers ===
Madina Masjid & Islamic Centre holds 5 daily prayers and weekly Friday sermons. Sermons are given in Bengali, English and Arabic. The prayer hall has a combined capacity of 1000 worshippers, including the extension to the mosque built in 2014.

=== Maktab Classes ===
The Masjid provides evening Quran and Hifz classes for children. Madina Masjid & Islamic Centre annually holds Darul Qirat – a summer course that teaches authentic recitation of the Quran.

=== Events ===
- Nikah Ceremonies
- Talks by guest speakers
- Iftar gatherings during Ramadan
- Monthly Halaqah
- Eid
- Taraweeh

=== Funeral Services ===
Funeral Services logo

After plans were granted in 2018, construction on the funeral services building began in 2019, and opened on 4 July 2021.

==== Services offered ====
- Funeral announcements
- Janaza
- Burials across the UK
- Transportation of bodies abroad
- Catering Facilities

== History ==
=== Former Premises (1881-1987) ===
The building was originally the Coldhurst Church of England Junior School, dating back to 1881. In 1963, the school converted to a Ukrainian Catholic Church, named after SS. Peter and Paul.

=== Masjid (1987–present) ===
When the Church left the building for Northmoor, the British Bangladeshi community in Oldham purchased it and established the current Masjid in 1987.

==== Extension of the prayer hall ====
In 2013, a plan for the extension of the Masjid's prayer hall and the allocation of parking space was approved. Construction finished in 2014, significantly increasing the Masjid's capacity of worshippers. To cover expenses for the interior and ablution area, Madina Masjid & Islamic Centre launched their first fundraising campaign on Channel i during Ramadan.

==== COVID-19 ====
During the COVID-19 pandemic, all mosques in the UK, including Madina Masjid & Islamic Centre, were closed. The Masjid opened again in July 2020.

== Gallery ==
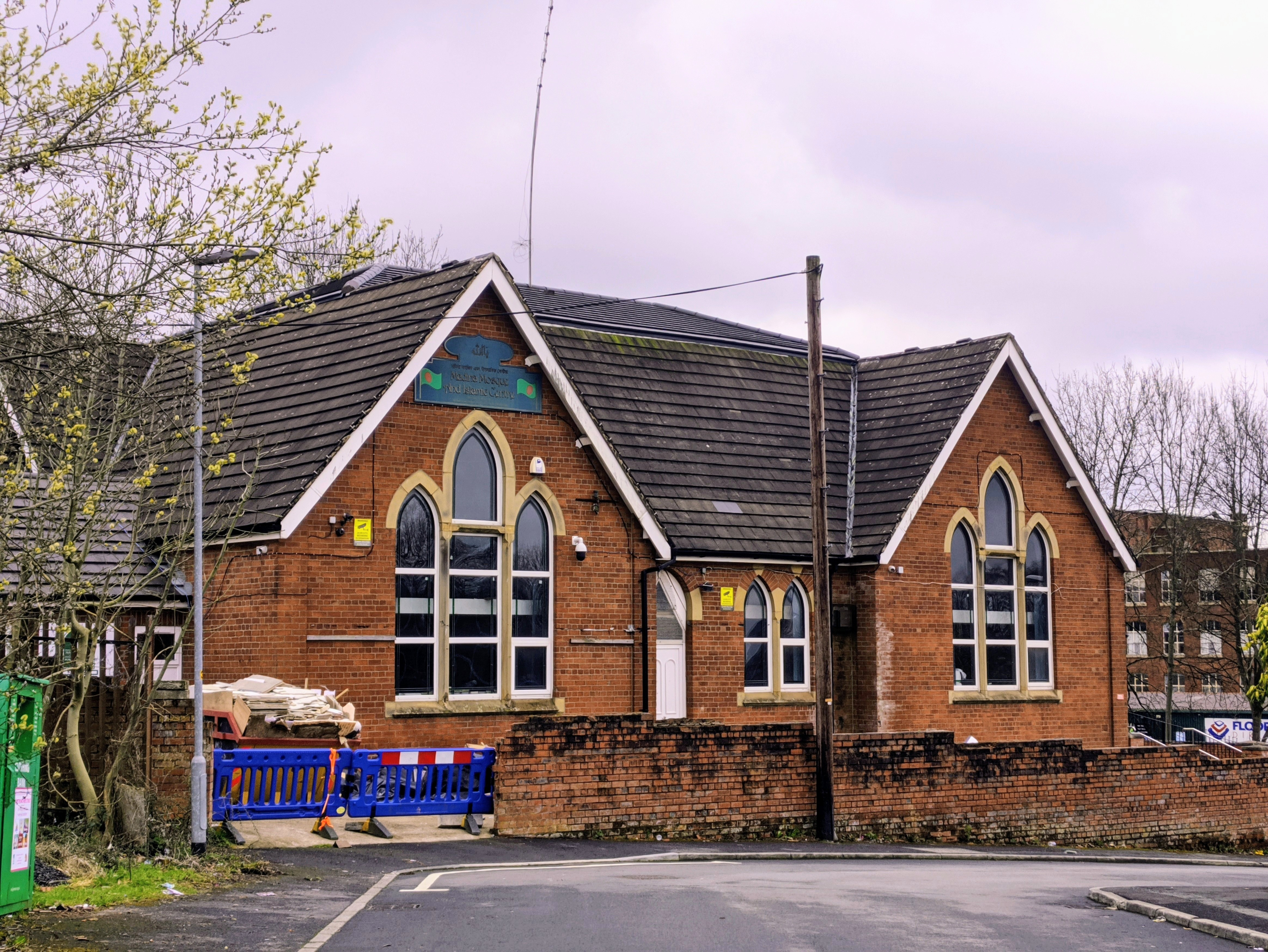
Masjid Exterior from Stansfield Street

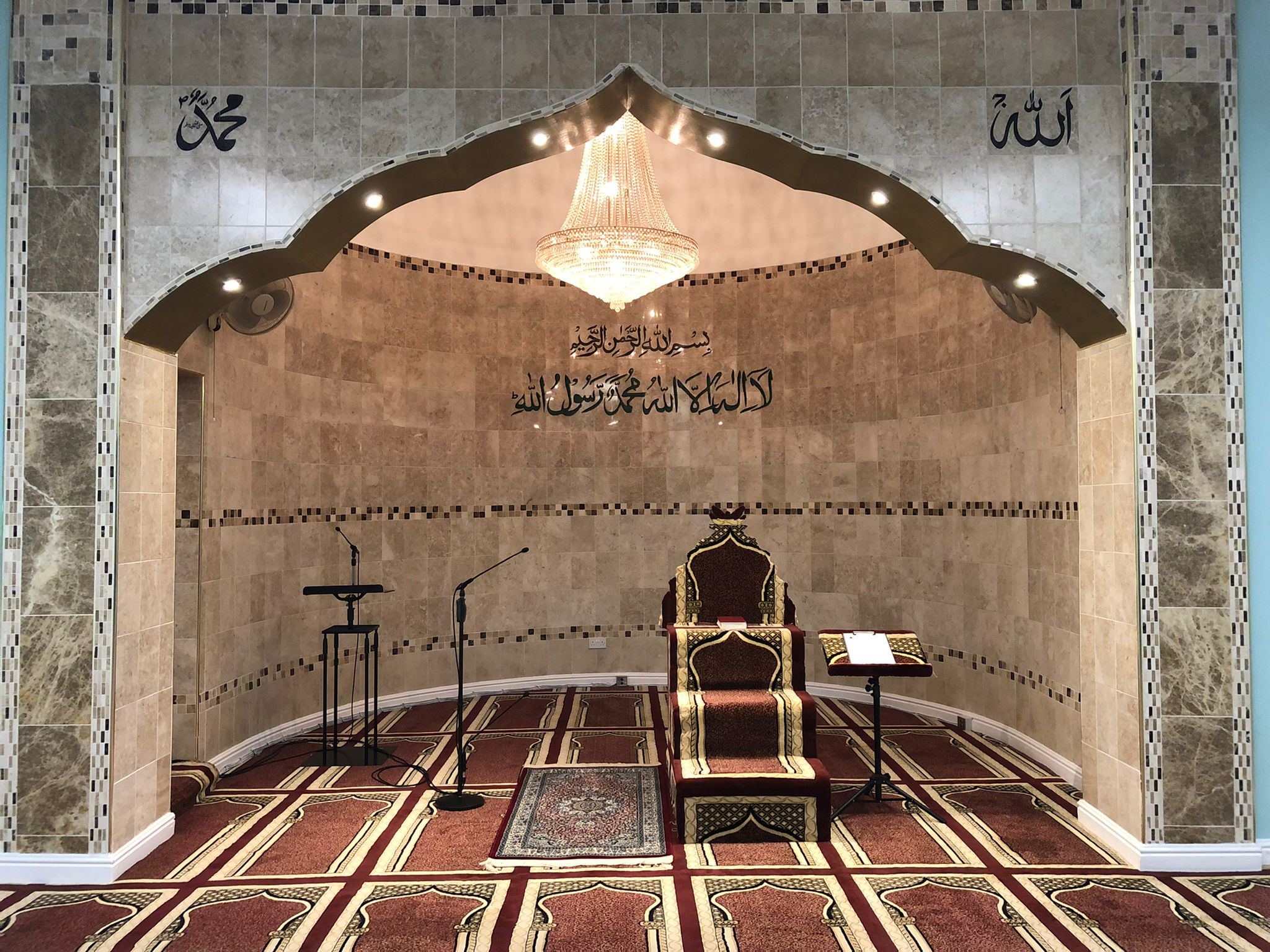
Mihrab

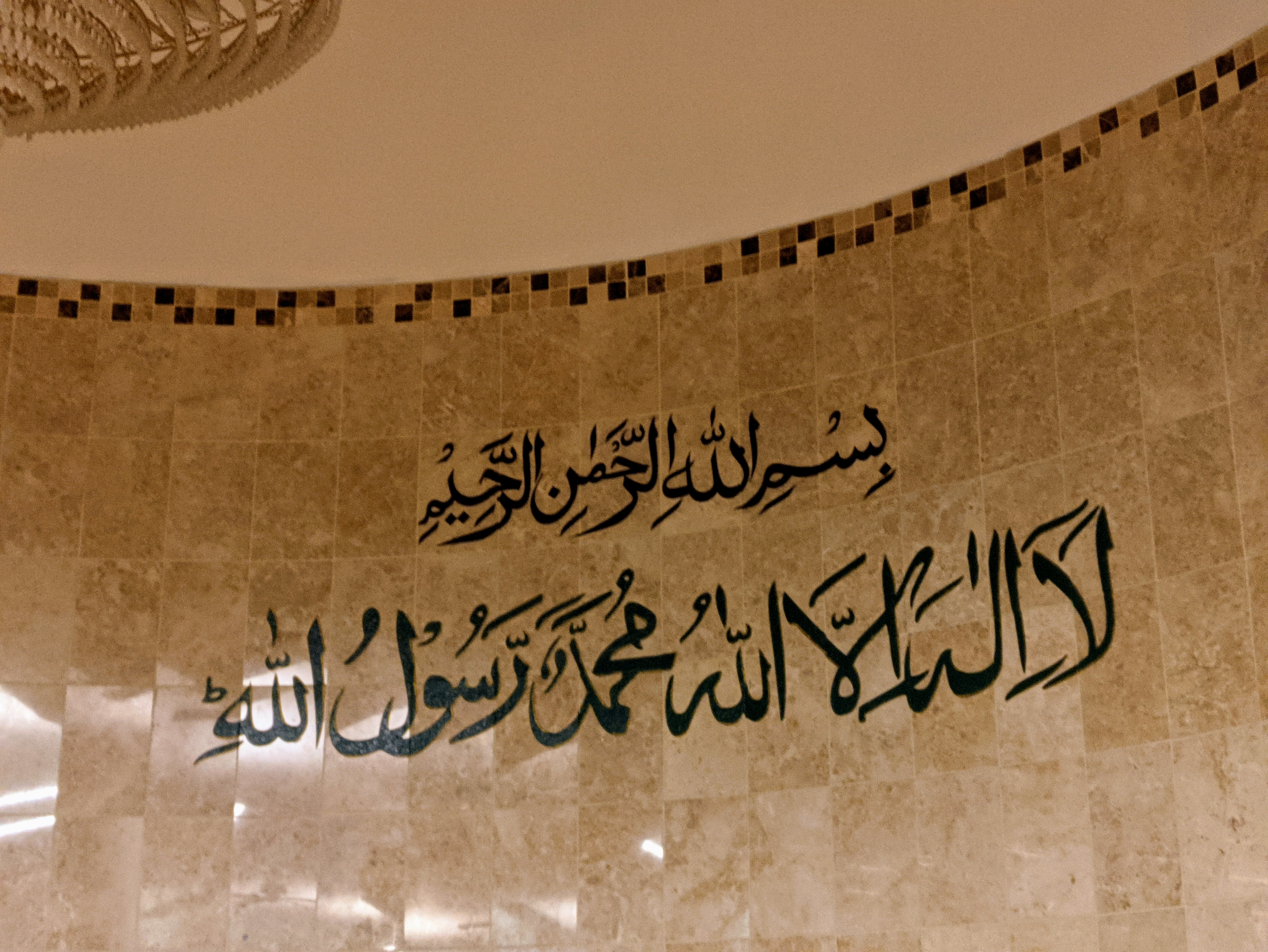
Calligraphy of the Shahada inside the Mihrab

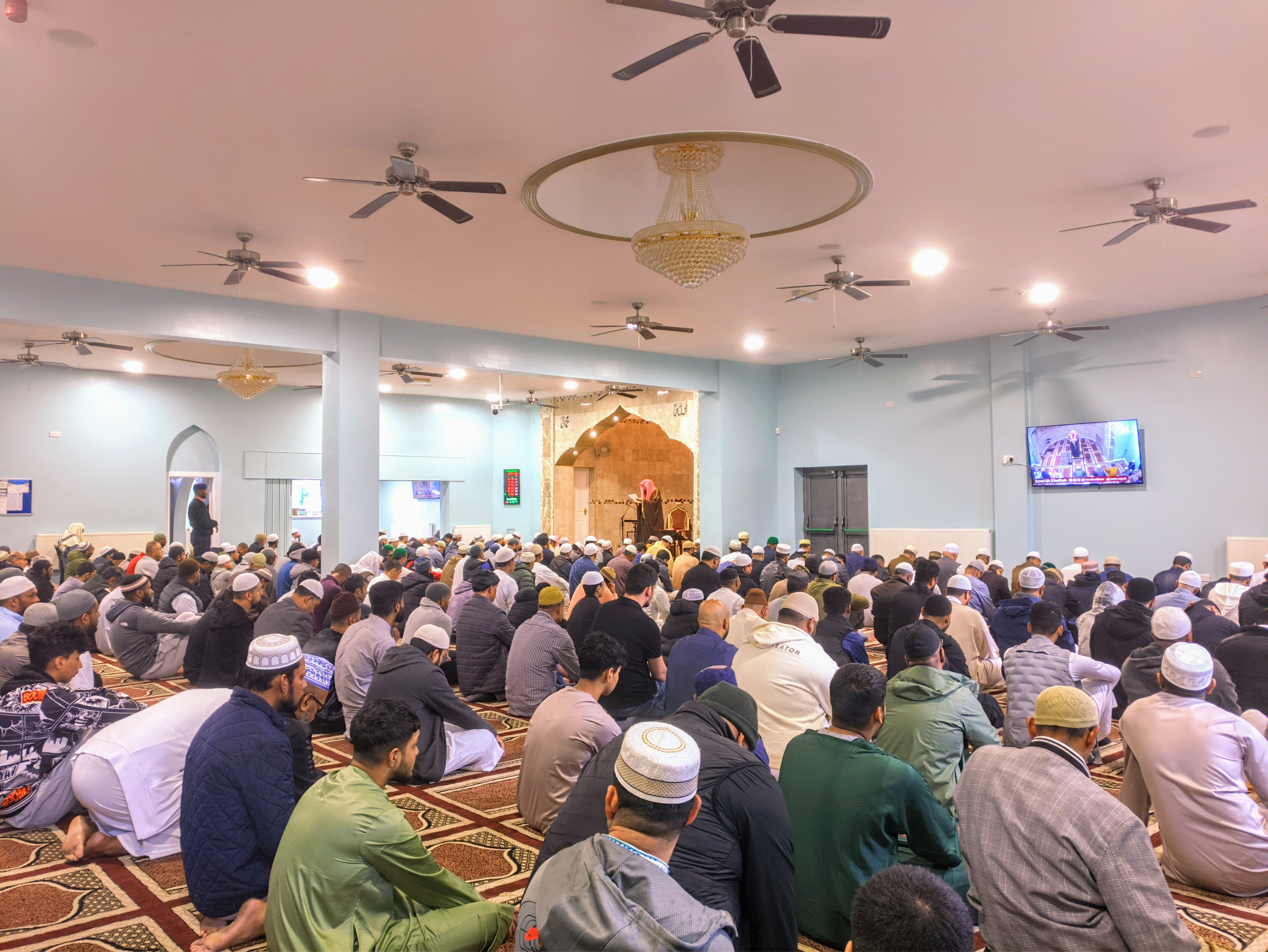
Prayer hall during Jumu'ah

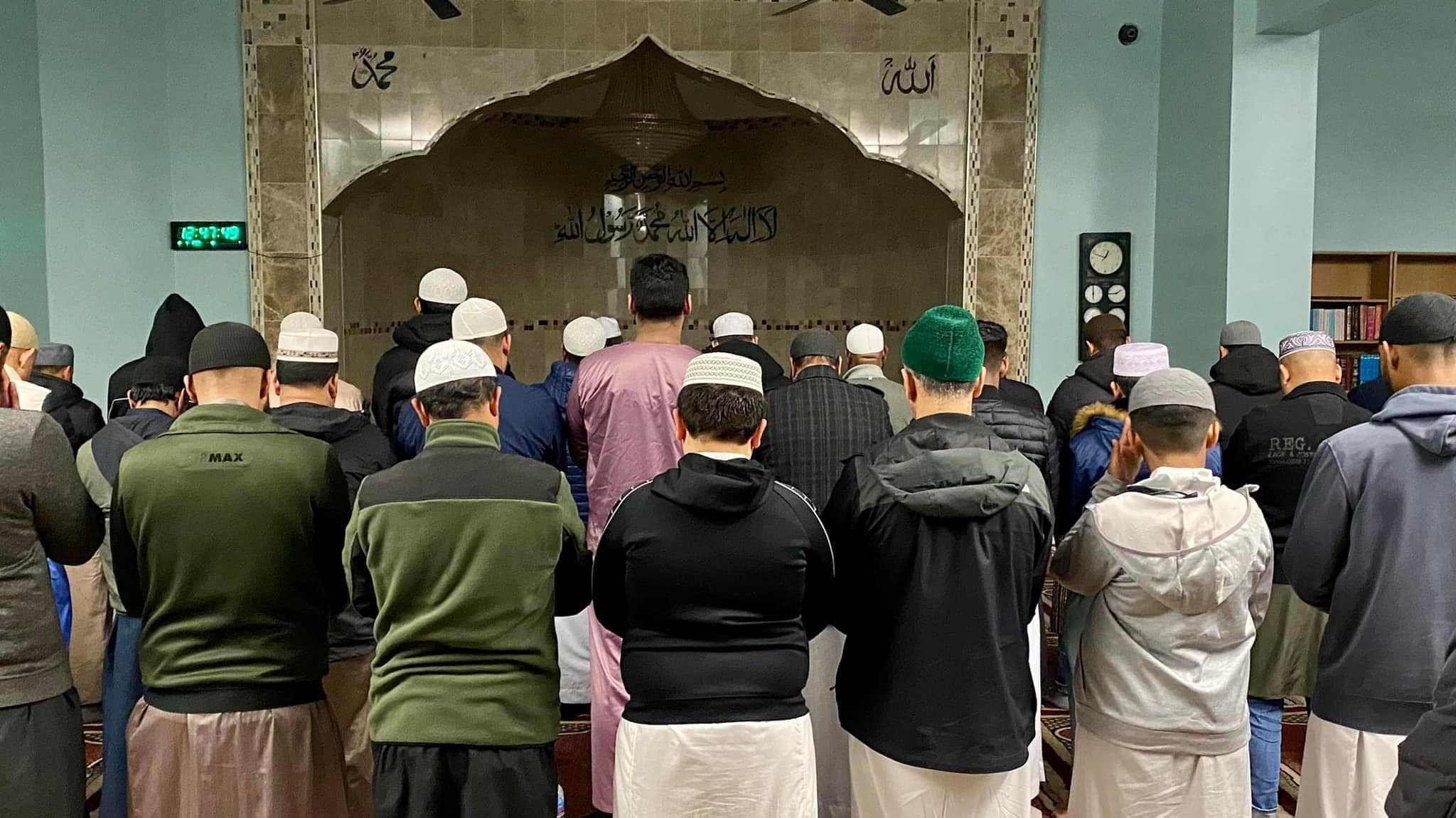
Prayer hall during Ramadan Tarawih prayers

== See also ==
- Islamic architecture
- Abdul Latif Chowdhury Fultali
- Brick Lane Mosque
- British Bangladeshi
- Islamic schools and branches
- List of mosques in the United Kingdom
