= Harrow Central Mosque =

Mosque in Harrow, England

Coordinates: 51.5891°N 0.3323°W

Harrow Central Mosque & Masood Islamic Centre
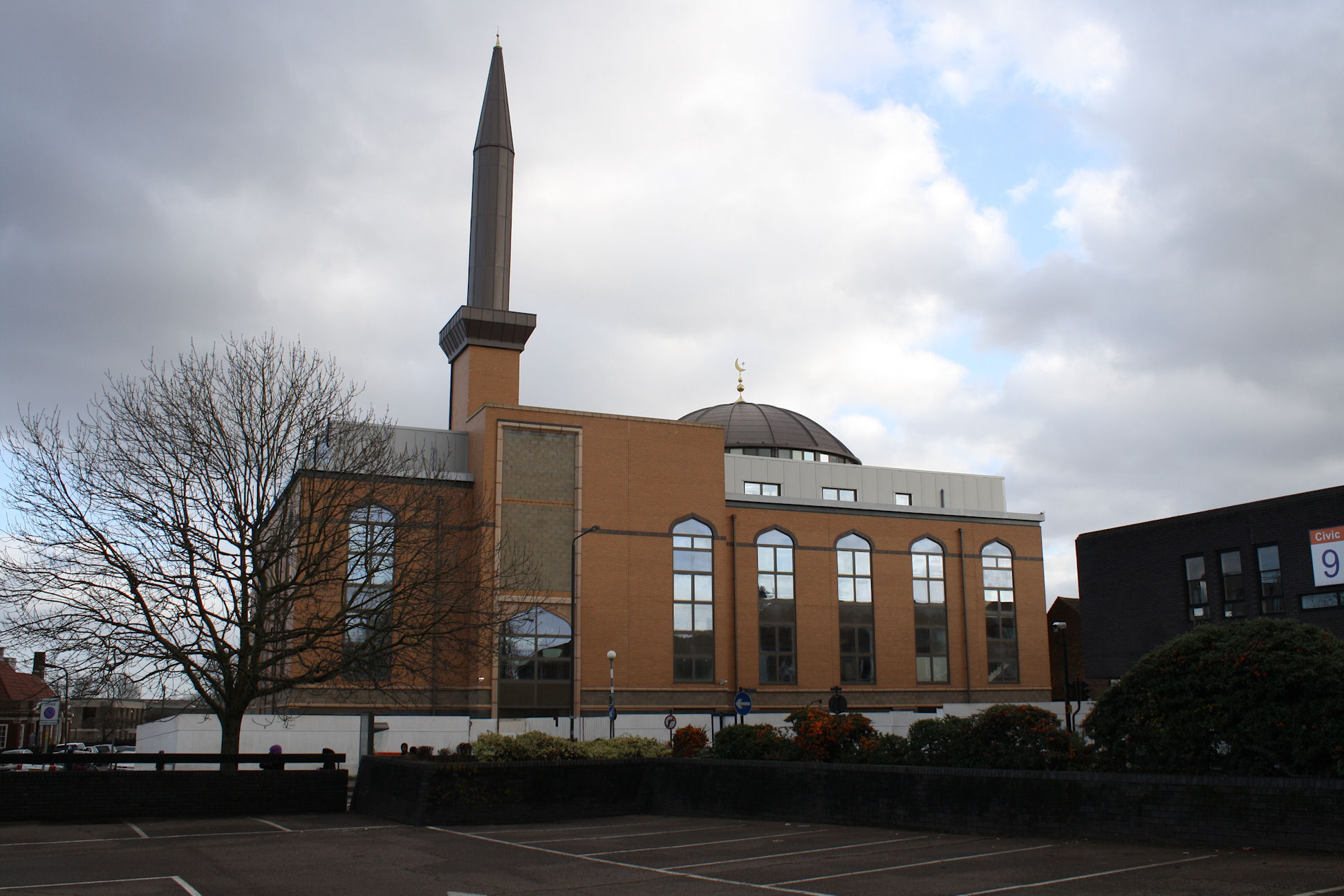

Religion
- Affiliation: Islam

Location
- Location: 34 Station Road, Harrow HA1 2SQ, London
- State: England
- Interactive map of Harrow Central Mosque & Masood Islamic Centre

Architecture
- Type: Mosque
- Style: Islamic; Modern
- Established: 1980; 46 years ago
- Completed: December 2011

Specifications
- Capacity: 4,500
- Dome: 1
- Minaret: 1

Website
- www.harrowmosque.org

Harrow Central Mosque is a Sunni mosque and Islamic community hub in Harrow, England. The current centre opened in 2011 on no. 34 Station Road, adjacent to Harrow Civic Centre and a short distance south of Wealdstone town centre. The purpose-built facility was constructed as a replacement of a house-based mosque next to it, at no. 36 Station Road, which had been occupied by the mosque from 1985.

== See also ==
- Islam in England
- Islamic schools and branches
- Islamism in London
- List of mosques in the United Kingdom
