= Noor-A-Madina Mosque =

Mosque in Lancashire, England, United Kingdom

Noor-A-Madina Ahle Sunnat Mosque
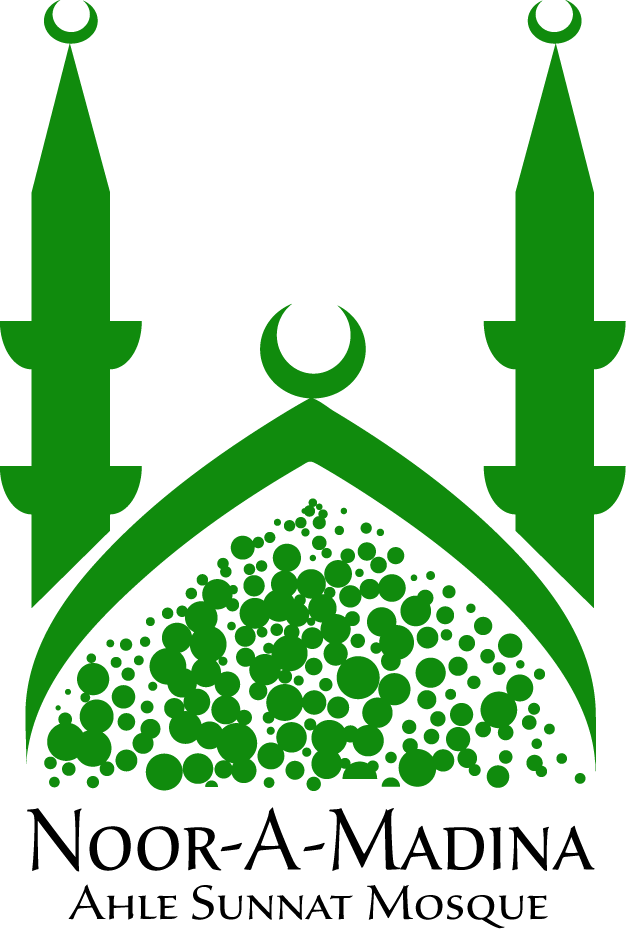

- Noor-A-Madina Mosque shown within Blackpool

Religion
- Affiliation: Sunni Islam
- Status: active

Location
- Location: Blackpool, England, United Kingdom
- Coordinates: 53.799341°N 3.044498°W

Architecture
- Type: mosque
- Established: 2010
- Capacity: 200

Website
- Noor-a-madina.com

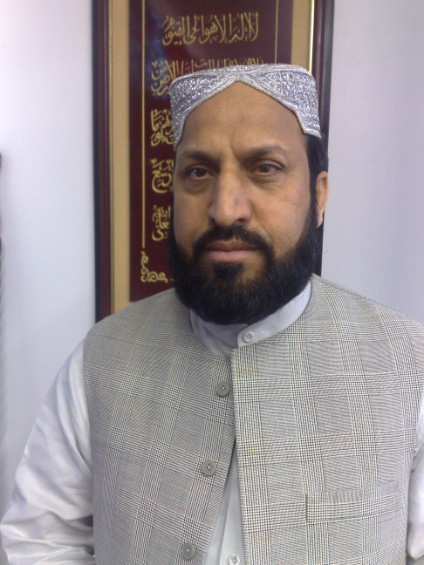
The Imam of Noor-a-Madina Mosque

Noor-A-Madina Ahle Sunnat Mosque is a Sunni Islam mosque in Blackpool, Lancashire, England.

== Facilities ==
Currently, there are two 200-person capacity buildings at the mosque; three remain under development. The mosque currently has a main prayer hall, a daily prayer hall, a ladies prayer room, multicultural centre, and a Quran classroom.

== Events ==
The mosque holds a yearly event to celebrate the birthday of the Islamic prophet Muhammad. The event, celebrated across the world, is named Milad-Un-Nabi.

== Noor-A-Madina Multi Cultural Centre ==
The multi-cultural centre offers many language and educational sessions such as Urdu, Polish, English, math, and Arabic to Muslims and non-Muslims.
