= Bristol Jamia Mosque =

Mosque in Bristol, England, United Kingdom

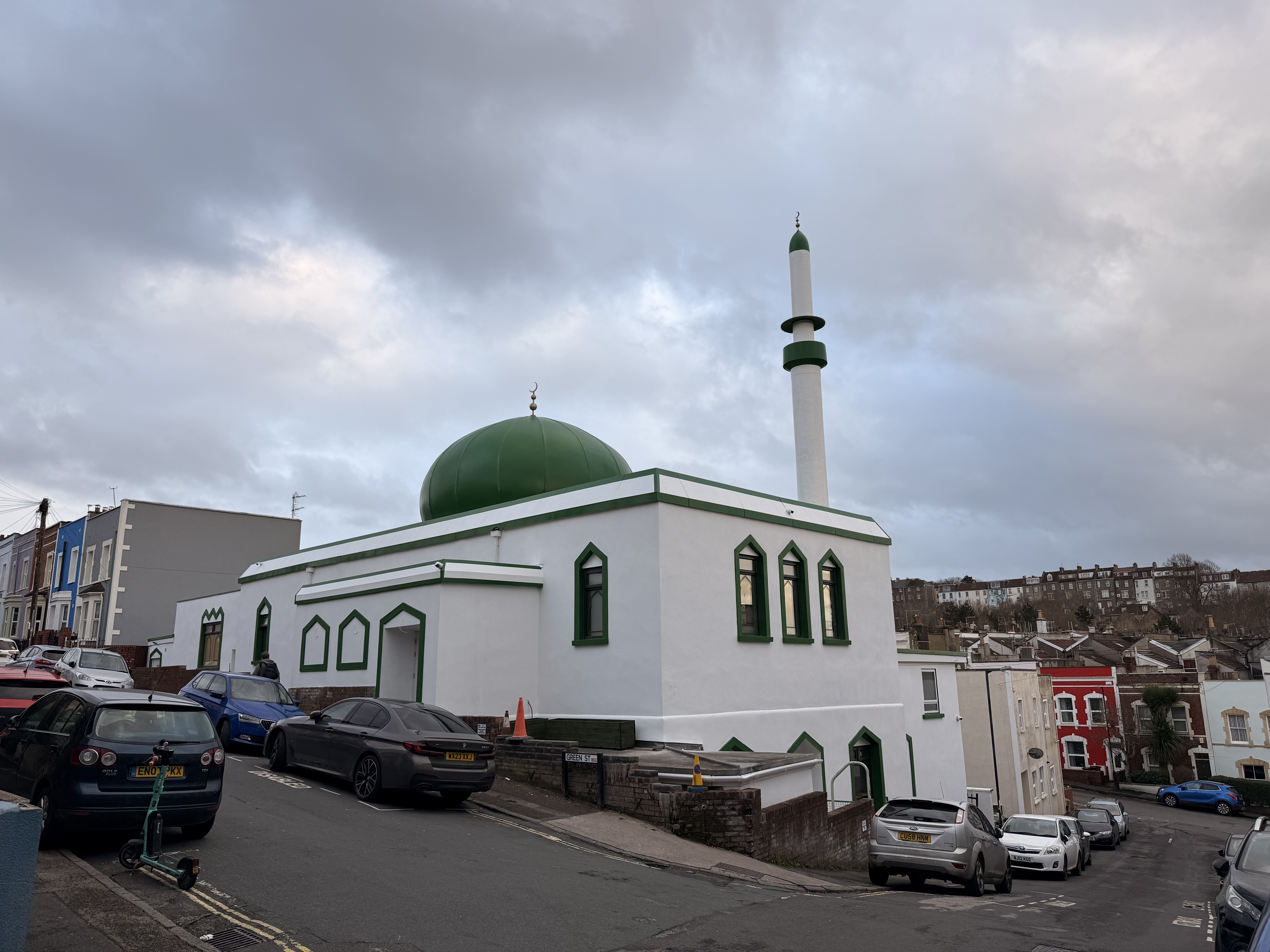

Location
- Location: Bristol, England
- Interactive map of Bristol Jamia Mosque
- Coordinates: 51.44213°N 2.58195°W

Architecture
- Completed: 1968

Specifications
- Capacity: 840
- Length: 67 m
- Width: 64 m
- Dome: 1
- Dome height (outer): 48.5 m
- Dome dia. (outer): 25.5 m
- Minaret: 1
- Minaret height: 88 m

Website
- Bristol Jamia Mosque

The Bristol Jamia Mosque is a mosque in the Totterdown area of Bristol, England. It was the first mosque in Bristol and is currently the largest in the south west of England. The building was formerly a disused church that was bought and converted into a mosque in 1968. It has since been embellished with a dome and minaret.

== Description ==
The mosque has one dome and one minaret. Both men and women are allowed to pray at the mosque; it has a main hall (capacity 700) and a separate women's prayer hall (capacity 140). The building also houses classrooms for children and an event hall for religious celebrations and other meetings. The main hall has a wooden Syrian mimbar. The mosque is open to all traditions of Islam and to the non-Muslim community of Bristol. Bristol Jamia Mosque is a registered charity and a member of Council of Bristol Mosques (CBM), a multi-denominational organisation of mosques in the city established in 2009.

== History ==
Bristol Jamia Mosque was originally an Anglican mission room, known as St. Katherine’s church, which was constructed in 1889 and closed in 1964. In 1968, the Bristol Muslim Association purchased the disused church from the parish council for conversion. The dome and minaret were added to the structure in 1980. It was the first mosque in Bristol and is currently the largest mosque in south-west England.
