= Farooq E Azam Mosque and Islamic Centre =

Mosque in England

- Location within North East England

Religion
- Affiliation: Islam

Location
- Location: Stockton-on-Tees, County Durham, England
- Interactive map of Farooq E Azam Mosque and Islamic Centre
- Coordinates: 54.559662°N 1.318467°W

Architecture
- Type: mosque
- Established: 2017
- Capacity: 2,500 worshippers

Website
- Facebook

The Farooq E Azam Mosque and Islamic Centre is an Islamic mosque in Stockton-on-Tees, County Durham, England. It opened on 15 July 2017, costing £2.2 million and taking 12 years to complete. The mosque can accommodate up to 2,500 people.

It is a registered charity, collecting £91,812 in 31 March 2021. The charity has a stated 6 Trustees and 20 Volunteers. The centre uses this money for the aim of "holding of prayer meetings, lectures, public celebration of religious festivals, providing services of worship, religious teaching, facilities and services to allow believers to practice their faith and follow its doctrines, whilst providing an opportunity and open learning environment for other practising faiths to gain information on Islamic beliefs and teachings and promote community cohesion".

The centre also provides outreach programs to the diverse population within Stockton. Local NHS services such as the James Cook University Hospital's intensive care unit and the local North East Ambulance Service have made financial donations. They have also hosted events and given equipment, such as defibrillators) to improve interaction with sidelined communities. One such event was for community food distribution during the 'beast from the east' weather event.

During the COVID-19 pandemic, the mosque was used as both a vaccination centre and an instrument against COVID vaccine misinformation. The mosque ran outreach programs to help dismiss fraudulent claims, and reinforce that the vaccine did "not contain alcohol, pork or any other animal or foetal products that would be forbidden by Islam".

== Events ==
It recently has won the right to play the call to prayer, or Adhan, once a week at a specifically agreed volume. The plan was voted 10-1 by Councillors to approve the plan, with two abstentions. This made it the first mosque within the north-east to be able to recite the Adhan. It will be broadcast on Fridays between midday and 14:00. The proposal was supported by both the local Labour Councillors Louise Baldock and Mohammed Javed as well as Conservative Tony Riordan, with reports that it would disrupt the local town atmosphere labelled as 'racist'.

This came two years after the mosque was vandalised with offensive graffiti, alongside the other neighbouring mosques of two Jamia Al-Bilal centres. In this incident messages of illicit intent were sprayed on the walls surrounding the mosques.

The mosque was featured in a post-Covid art display, funded by the government-sponsored national 'Here and Now' art project, in association with the Stockton Arts Centre. Created by art group Invisible Flock and artist Umar Butt, the new sound installation 'looked at the town through ten viewpoints. Coming out of lockdown, the piece highlighted both the hidden and distinctive sounds of places where communities gather. Through a series of interviews individuals reflected on being in the town, and the connections or barriers of communication to other people living alongside them'.

During the mourning for Queen Elizabeth II, the mosque took part alongside other local religious buildings and organisations, displaying a large lit-up display of a Union flag on its exterior wall.
