= Bournemouth Islamic Centre and Central Mosque =

Mosque in Dorset, England

Coordinates: 50°43′19″N 1°52′48″W

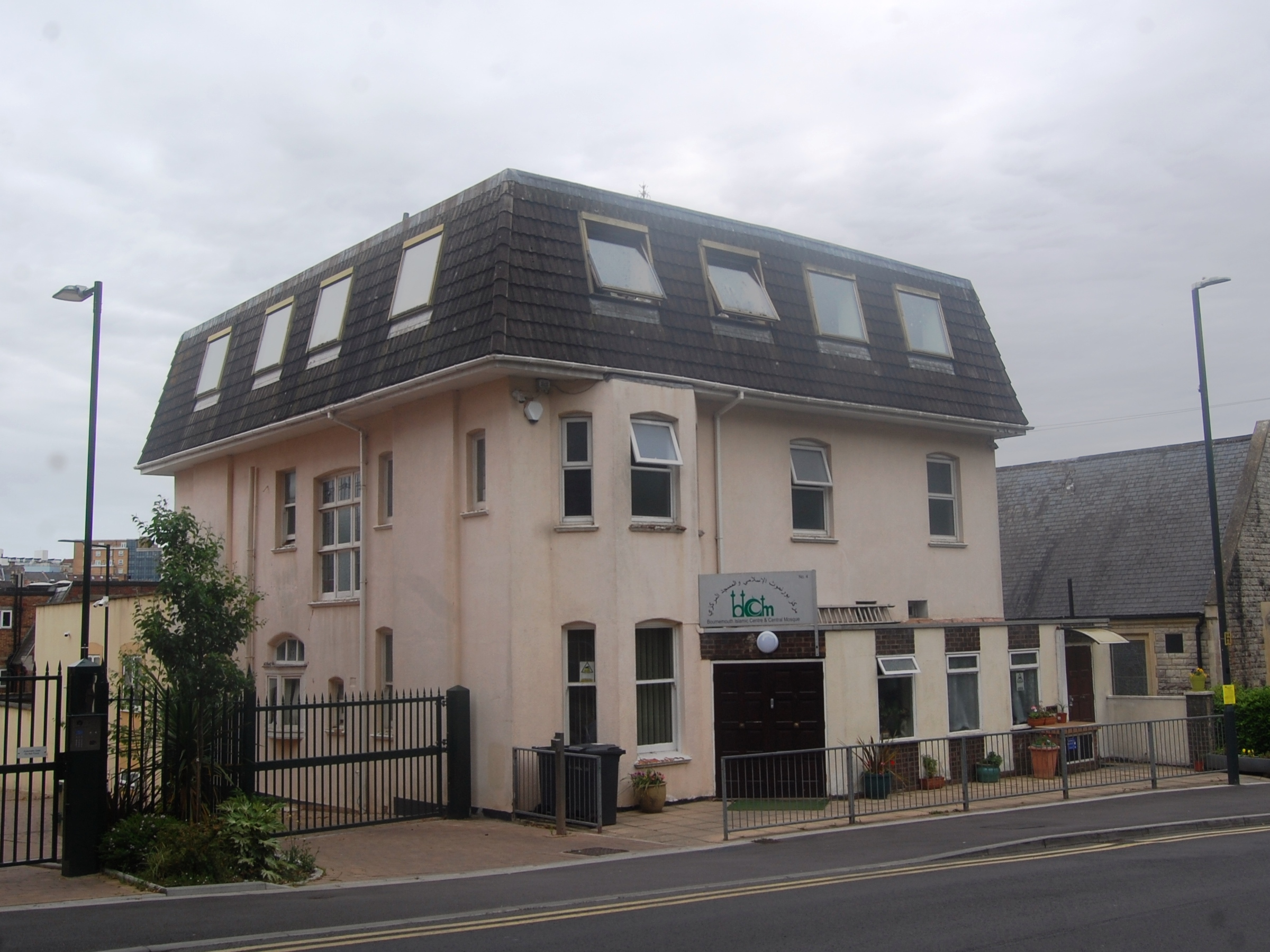

Religion
- Affiliation: Islam

Location
- Location: 4 St Stephen's Road, Bournemouth

The Bournemouth Islamic Centre and Central Mosque is a mosque in the centre of Bournemouth, a town in the English county of Dorset. The building is located in the town centre near St. Andrew's Church and St Stephen's Church.

== History ==
The Bournemouth Islamic Centre and Central Mosque is the main Mosque in the town of Bournemouth. The central mosque is a pink building on St Stephens Road. In 2021, the mosque was used as a COVID-19 vaccination centre. In 2023, the mosque asked for permission to take security measures following reports of attacks.

== See also ==
- List of mosques in the United Kingdom
