= Islamic Forum of Europe =

Organization

- Official logo of the IFE
- Headquarters: Whitechapel, Tower Hamlets, London, UK; Piazza Vittorio Emanuele II, Rome, Italy
- Location: England, Italy, Spain, Portugal, France, Greece, Germany
- Coordinates: 51.5176°N 0.0656°W
- Key people: Dr Abdul Bari; Azad Ali; Ed Husain; Barrister Nazibur Rahman; Barrister Arman bin Quasem; Nowshad Mahfuz; Barrister Nazrul Islam; Abu Bakr Mollah; Aminur Rahman; Islam Uddin; Nizam Uddin; Mosharraf Hossain; Chowdhury Mueen-Uddin; Abdul Qayum (imam)
- Parent organization: Jamaat-e-Islami
- Affiliations: European Council for Fatwa and Research; Muslim Council of Britain
- Website: islamicforumeurope.com

The Islamic Forum of Europe (IFE) is an Islamic organisation based in various countries across western Europe. Its charitable arm was the Islamic Forum Trust. Founded by the members of Bangladesh Jamaat-e-Islami, IFE was formerly headquartered in Tower Hamlets, London, and it now mainly operates across Italy, Greece, Portugal and Spain.

Its youth wing is known as Young Muslim Organisation (YMO), and its women's wing is Muslimaat UK. Its London and Sunderland branches are affiliated to the Muslim Council of Britain.

According to Andrew Gilligan, former adviser of the British Prime Minister and Jim Fitzpatrick, former MP, the Islamic Forum of Europe supported Mayor Lutfur Rahman of achieving part of East London's leadership and infiltrated the local government and the Labour Party.

IFE was described by The Daily Telegraph as a sophisticated political group with a structured rank system and hardline goals. It has been also alleged that, during the Aspire Party's control of Tower Hamlets, millions of pounds of public money were paid to organisations run by the Islamic Forum of Europe, and that the results included stocks of Islamist literature being made available in public libraries.

== History ==
IFE was founded in 1988 as a British Bangladeshi professional group. Its first president was Dr Muhammad Abdul Bari who later became chairman of the East London Mosque, succeeded by Musleh Faradhi as President since 2005. It was supported by Chowdhury Mueen-Uddin, who stands accused of at least 18 murders as well as war crimes in his native Bangladesh, although he contests the allegations.

It was reportedly founded by former members of the Jamaat-e-Islami, with whom it came into conflict over management of the East London Mosque "throughout the late 1980s" resulting in "two High Court injunctions" in 1990 in "response to violence" at the mosque. Dawat'ul Islam is now based at another mosque, Jamiatul Ummah Bigland Street.

Abdullah Faliq is the Deputy Secretary-General, who also help set up the Cordoba Foundation.

An event held by the IFE, hosted Anwar al-Awlaki as a speaker.

It has also worked with the street protest group United East End that opposes the English Defence League (EDL) and part of the Enough Coalition, an umbrella group which aims to tackle anti-Muslim hatred, and that includes organisations such as the Stop the War Coalition, British Muslim Initiative, Federation of Student Islamic Societies, Unite Against Fascism and the East London Mosque.

Muhammad Rabbani, a former senior activist at IFE, went on to become managing director of Cageprisoners and worked at the Osmani Trust. While at IFE, in 2009 he told recruits that:

Our goal is to create the True Believer, [and] to then mobilise these believers into an organised force for change who will carry out dawah [preaching], hisbah [accountability] and jihaad [striving to establish a community]. This will lead to social change and Iqamat-ud-Deen [an Islamic social and political order].

== Islamic Forum Trust ==
The IFT has donated £16,119 to the Staffordshire Muslim Centre charity, and £257,847 to the Luton Islamic Community Forum (LIFC).

It owns properties that it rents out for private hire to other organisations, one of which is in Lozells, Birmingham, it also owns the Union, Berners Street, Lozells in Birmingham.

It also set up the Oldham Muslim Centre (OMC) branch at a cost of £2.2m which opened in April 2010. Vice chairman of the project Syed Badrul Alam, and Central President of the IFE Mohammad Habibur Rahman were at the opening. The trust also owns 120-122 Chadderton Way, also in Oldham.

== Politics ==
The group in 2006 was described as part of a movement of Bangladeshi immigrants in London away from secular left politics towards Islamist politics.

IFE is also reported as the group which runs the East London Mosque, which is located close to its offices. IFE and the mosque have hosted many notable persons and religious leaders including Prince Charles, Abdullah Ahmad Badawi, Fiona MacTaggart, Brendan Barber, Dr Yasir Qadhi, Abdul Rahman Al-Sudais, Saud Al-Shuraim, Salah Al Budair, Bakir Izetbegović, Jamal Badawi, Allama Delwar Hossain Sayeedi and many others.

Farming minister Jim Fitzpatrick reprimanded the organisation for sex segregation policies at the mosque after attending an Islamic wedding held at the venue which strictly seated men and women separately.

A Dispatches documentary aired on 1 March 2010 suggested the IFE are an extremist organization with a hidden agenda that went against Britain's democratic values. Dispatches quoted Azad Ali, the IFE's community affairs coordinator, as saying, "Democracy, if it means at the expense of not implementing the sharia, of course no one agrees with that".

Ali's controversial blog Between the Lines was hosted by the IFE.

In a comment piece in The Guardian newspaper, Inayat Bunglawala of the Muslim Council of Britain suggested that many of the people interviewed on the programme had hidden agendas of their own and noted that Jim Fitzpatrick, who suggested the Labour Party had been infiltrated by IFE members, was to be challenged for his seat by George Galloway in the forthcoming general election who had overturned a 10,000+ majority held by Oona King at the 2005 election.

Galloway was recorded as saying that his 2005 election owed "more than I can say, more than it would be wise for me to say, to the Islamic Forum of Europe." Responding to the Dispatches programme, Galloway denounced it as a smear, credited the IFE only as one of several groups that helped his anti-war campaign, and claimed to know little about the IFE's membership or policies.

The programme also claimed that the IFE also helped Lutfur Rahman to gain the leadership of Tower Hamlets Council from 2008 until 2010. Six unknown Labour councillors told Dispatches that a senior IFE official had threatened to mobilise the group's supporters against them if they did not support the candidate. IFE in a response to the programme stated that the programme "Presented a grossly inaccurate and misleading picture of the Islamic Forum of Europe (IFE). The programme failed to broadcast IFE’s responses to many of the allegations and therefore failed in its basic obligation of fair, honest and balanced reporting."

The IFE and Young Muslim Organisation were featured in the book The Islamist by Ed Husain, where he explains that the Young Muslim Organisation attracts mainly English-speaking Asian youths, providing circles or talks daily at the East London Mosque; while teaching about Islam, it covers the political system of the religion.

In February 2010, The Daily Telegraph described the group as "a sophisticated political group with a structured rank system and hardline goals. Prospective recruits must attend training. One undercover reporter was told that she would have to take an exam and swear an oath of allegiance and ordered to keep her membership of the IFE a secret." Robert Lambert, at the time co-director of the University of Exeter's European Muslim Research Centre, criticized the accusations, maintaining that youth workers from the Islamic Forum of Europe were actively working to oppose the influence of extremist groups such as Al Qaeda and Al Muhajiroun: "the brave Muslims involved have received no praise for their outstanding bravery and good citizenship, and instead faced a never ending barrage of denigration."

== See also ==
- Azad Ali, spokesman for Islamic Forum of Europe
