= Blackpool Central Mosque =

Mosque located in Blackpool, United kingdom

Central Mosque Blackpool
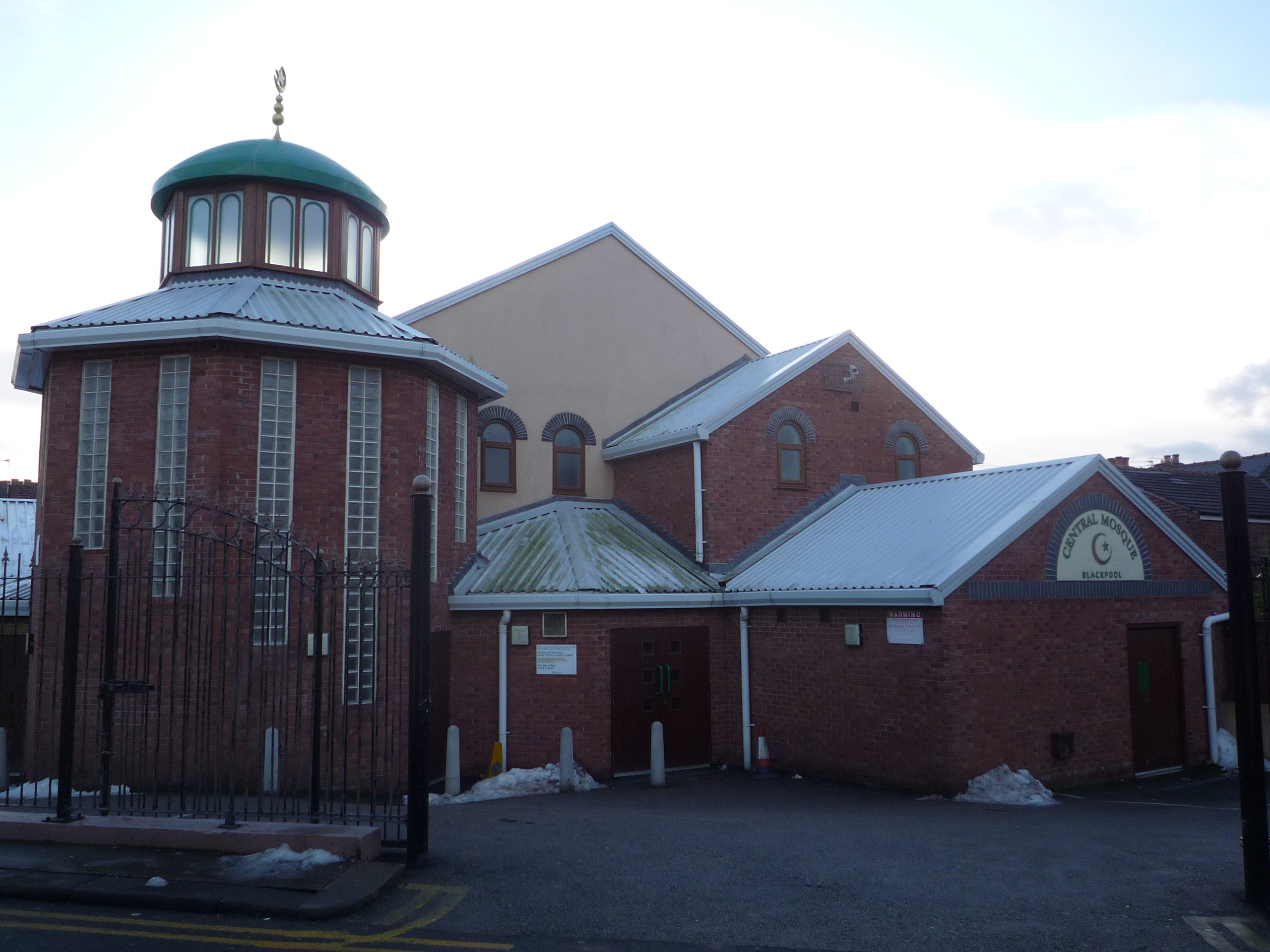

- Location within Blackpool

Religion
- Affiliation: Islam
- Status: active

Location
- Location: Blackpool, England
- Coordinates: 53.8083°N 3.0449°W

Architecture
- Type: Mosque
- Style: Indo-Saracenic
- Completed: 2005

Specifications
- Capacity: 500
- Minaret: 1

Website
- blackpool-mosque.co.uk

Blackpool Central Mosque and Islamic Community Centre is a Sunni mosque in Blackpool, Lancashire, England.

== History ==
The mosque was originally housed in a building on Rigby Road, before moving to its own purpose-built building on Revoe Street. In January 2005 the mosque won a heritage award from Blackpool Civic Trust.

The current Imam is Maulana Ashfaq Patel, who is also the Muslim chaplain at Blackpool, Fylde and Wyre hospitals. The mosque is a member of the Blackpool Area Faith Forum.

== Facilities ==
The mosque houses a 500-person-capacity main prayer hall, a daily prayer hall, a ladies prayer room and 7 classrooms.

== Blackpool Islamic Community Centre ==
The Blackpool Islamic Community Centre (BICC) runs classes, seminars and events for Muslims and non-Muslims.
