= Wembley Central Mosque =

Mosque in London, England

Coordinates: 51.5503°N 0.2979°W

Wembley Central Mosque and Muslim Welfare Association
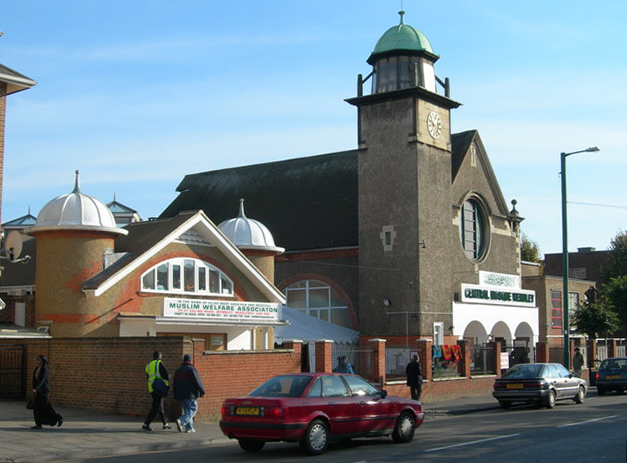

Religion
- Affiliation: Islam
- Branch/tradition: Sunni
- Ownership: Muslim Welfare Association Ltd.
- Leadership: Imam(s): Moulana Mubasshir Ali.; Moulana Sajid; Chairman: Mehboob Bhamani

Location
- Location: London, United Kingdom
- Interactive map of Wembley Central Mosque and Muslim Welfare Association

Architecture
- Architects: Thomas Edward Collcutt & Stanley Hemp (1904); Capital Constructions Ltd (2011)
- Type: Church, redesigned as Mosque
- Established: 1985
- Construction cost: £680,000

Specifications
- Capacity: 2200+
- Minaret: 3

Website
- www.wembleycentralmasjid.co.uk

The Wembley Central Mosque (formerly the St Andrew's Presbyterian Church) is a mosque in the London Borough of Brent. The principal mosque in North West London, it is located on Ealing Road, Wembley, and serves the United Kingdom’s fifth largest Muslim community, which is predominantly Pakistani and Bangladeshi. Along with the adjacent Muslim Welfare Association, it can hold up to 2200 people.

== Building details ==
The three-storey semi-detached Flemish bond brick building was built in 1904 as St Andrew's Presbyterian Church, designed by Thomas Collcutt and Stanley Hamp, who was the main contributor to the costs. The design was influenced by the Arts and Crafts Movement. The brick walls have stone dressings, and there is a tiled gable-facing roof, a broad barrel-vaulted nave, with Diocletian windows and a narthex within it in the form of a wooden gallery, an apse with a hemispherical ceiling, and an arched colonnade at the west end. A northwest tower stands slightly apart from the main building.

The use as a church ended in 1978, and the building stood empty for fifteen years until in 1993 it was bought for £380,000 by the mosque committee. It was listed as a Grade II listed building in that year, by which time the church fittings had been removed.

Work on the conversion to a mosque took place between 1993 and 1996, with the committee spending £100,000 on refurbishing the whole building and building a new ablution area for the men. The mosque has a large hall, a gallery, offices and a funeral room. In 2003, construction began on the first expansion project, to create the Muslim Welfare Association, where a two-storey building adjacent to the mosque had been burnt down in a fire due to an electrical fault. The cost of the project was £500,000. The renovation work finished in 2005, including a brand new first floor. The centre has two halls, classrooms, ladies area, kitchen unit, a meeting room, and a main office.

== History ==
=== 1985: The original Wembley Central Mosque ===
The MWA Committee was set up in 1985 to organise congregational prayers because there was no mosque in North West London despite the high number of Muslims. The committee purchased a three-storey semi-detached house on Harrowdene Road. It could hold a capacity of up to 400 worshippers but soon the Muslim community was growing. A new and bigger mosque with facilities for all Muslims was necessary.

=== 1993: The new Wembley Central Mosque ===
The St Andrew's Presbyterian Church in the centre of Wembley had been vacant for fifteen years. It was bought by the charity funds of the Muslim community, and the money made from the sale of the smaller mosque, established in 1985 on Harrowdene Road. It took three years to complete all the work that was essential. After the work had been completed, the mosque was ready for use. Soon the mosque held the five daily congregational prayers, Jumu'ah prayers, Ramadan prayers (Taraweeh & Tahajjud) and Eid prayers. The new Wembley Central Mosque held a capacity of 700 worshippers. The mosque was also now allowed to broadcast the live Adhan (call to prayer) using loudspeakers only for Jumu'ah (Friday prayer).

=== 1996: Single-storey extension ===
As the building was listed, the committee found it hard to get permission from the local council for building plans but after a long time of trying and hard work, they finally got permission for a single storey extension linked to the back of the mosque to create a brand new ablution area, offices and funeral services.

=== 2003: First expansion project (Muslim Welfare Association) ===
The Muslim population was increasing rapidly each year. Adjacent to the mosque was an old unused building. The committee and the community decided to rebuild it and put it to good use. At first, there was a slight financial problem but the community pitched in together and the mosque instantly raised £500,000 to rebuild the building and name it the Muslim Welfare Association. Work began straightaway in 2003 and the new centre opened in 2005 with over 4,000 people attending the opening Friday prayers.

The Muslim Welfare Association is the other side of Wembley Central Mosque. The committee hoped that the Muslim Welfare Association will help the community by providing better facilities for women, WCM Evening Madrasah, Sunday School and on a busy day, the Muslim Welfare Association can be used for prayer space and can accommodate up to 500 worshippers.

=== 2009: Second expansion project ===
On Fridays, The mosque and centre gets filled up promptly even though there are two Jumu'ah Prayers. Worshippers have to pray on the streets. The Wembley Central Mosque & Muslim Welfare Association decided to launch their second expansion project costing over £1 million. The expansion project aimed to increase the prayer capacity from 2200 to 3500 by building a new prayer hall linked to the existing main hall. After the construction work is complete, there will be more services and facilities including a fully equipped library with ICT facilities. Also, there will be improved facilities for Islamic funeral services.

Meetings were held between the mosque committee, contractors, builders (Capital Constructions) and also the council for permission. After getting permission for a three phase expansion project, Wembley Central Mosque started collecting funds.

=== 2011 ===
On 10 January 2011, Phase 1 of the expansion project began.

On 16 March 2011, Qur'an reciter Abu Bakr Shatri visited the mosque. He first recited Surah Ar-Rahman and then he presented the mosque with an award which was accepted by the Head Imam, Abdul Sattar. Abu Bakr Shatri then made a Dua for the whole Muslim Ummah with the congregation joining in with him.

On 9 July 2011, Egyptian reciter Muhammad Jibreel visited the mosque on his UK tour sponsored by ‘Islamic Relief’. He led the Maghrib Prayer and then offered some Quran recitations in Murattal style.

Present services in the Wembley Central Mosque & Muslim Welfare Association include:

- Complete Islamic Marriage Service
- Halaqah – Topics discussed in various languages
- Sunday School – Islamic classes for older children (teenagers) held in the Muslim Welfare Association
- WCM Evening Madrasah – After school, Islamic Education for children (Wembley Central Madrasah)
- Monthly Islamic Lecture – Lectures done on various Islamic topics. Done on the last Sunday of each month
- Women's Resources – Training and support centre for women

Future planned services include:

- ICT classes – ICT and ESOL training
- Language classes – Classes for learning languages
- Training centre – Training adults for employment
- Careers Advice – Advice with CV writing, applications and interview techniques

2018: Newly Appointed Trustee by charity commission

== See also ==
- Islam in London
- Islamic schools and branches
- Islamism in London
- List of mosques in the United Kingdom
