= Muhammad Abdul Bari =

Bangladeshi-born British physicist, writer, teacher, and community leader (born 1953)

The Honourable Doctor Muhammad Abdul Bari MBE DL FRSA Esq.
- মুহাম্মাদ আব্দুল বারি
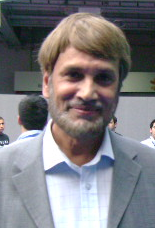
- Born: 2 October 1953 (age 72); Tangail, East Pakistan, Pakistan
- Citizenship: British
- Education: Chittagong University; Royal Holloway, University of London; King's College London; Open University
- Occupations: Physicist, educationalist, writer, scholar
- Years active: 2004–present

Muhammad Abdul Bari (Bengali: মুহাম্মাদ আব্দুল বারি; born October 1953) is a Bangladeshi-born British physicist, writer, teacher, and community leader. He is a former secretary of Muslim Aid, a former chairman of the East London Mosque, and a former secretary general of the Muslim Council of Britain. He also served as the president of the Islamic Forum of Europe (IFE) in its early years when it was formed to organize Bangladeshi diaspora professionals in Europe. In addition to consultancy work, he has written for publications including The Huffington Post and Al Jazeera, and has authored numerous books.

He has been described as one of the most powerful Asian Muslims in Western Europe. In 2006, Time Out put him at #7 on its list of movers and shakers in London. He has also been listed as a community leader in The 500 Most Influential Muslims.

== Early life and education ==
Abdul Bari joined the Bangladesh Air Force in 1978, after studying at Chittagong University. He married in 1981 and left the Air Force the following year. After moving to the United Kingdom, he earned a doctorate in physics from King's College London in 1986 and joined Royal Holloway, University of London, as a postdoctoral researcher. There, he became involved in community work.

He began teaching after completing a Postgraduate Certificate in Education (PGCE) at King's College London in 1991. He spent five years teaching science at a secondary school in Haringey, London, and joined the Tower Hamlets Education Authority as a special educational needs specialist in 1997.

== Career ==
TELCO is now a branch of Citizens UK (CUK), an alliance of local community organizing groups in London, Birmingham, Cardiff, Milton Keynes, and Nottingham. Abdul Bari is a member of CUK's National Council and advised CUK's Commission on Islam, Participation, and Public Life, which was created in September 2015 to confront rising Islamophobia since the 7 July 2005 London bombings.

He served on the London Organising Committee of the Olympic and Paralympic Games Board (LOCOG), which was responsible for preparing for and staging the 2012 Summer Olympics.

In 2014, he created the website Head2heart as a sociopolitical commenting platform, in addition to his business website AmanaParenting, which provides parenting support and consultancy work. He created a bilingual (Bengali and English) YouTube channel under the same AmanaParenting banner, in 2015 to advise on parenting in a pluralist society. In 2018, Dr Abdul Bari consolidated his two previous websites and now presents his thought leadership on various social, political and community topics as well as parenting services through his personal blog DrAbdulBari .

== Awards and recognition ==
In the 2003 New Year Honours, Abdul Bari was appointed a member of the Order of the British Empire. In 2005, he was made a fellow of the Royal Society of Arts. In July 2008, he was made an honorary fellow of Queen Mary University of London.

The London Evening Standard listed him as one of London's 1,000 most influential people in 2009. He was also recognised for outstanding achievement in Islamic affairs and community relations by British Bangladeshi Who's Who. In 2013, he was included in the British Bangladeshi Power 100.

The University of East London granted him an honorary doctorate in education in November 2012 "for his work as Secretary General of the Muslim Council of Britain from 2006 to 2010 and for his contribution to the cultural life of east London". In the 11th Muslim Awards Ceremony of The Muslim News in March 2013, he received the Iman wa Amal (Faith and Action) Special Award.

Abdul Bari was appointed deputy lieutenant of the Greater London Lieutenancy in July 2016.

== Views ==
Abdul Bari has appeared in the British media to speak about Muslims in Britain, integration, and efforts to control the rise of fundamentalism among and against Muslims since the 11 September 2001 and 7 July 2005 attacks. While being a Board Member of London 2012 Olympic and Paralympic Committee he also made many appearances on international TV. He also spoke at many universities, public institutions and other organisations while he was head of the Muslim Council of Britain. In an interview with The Daily Telegraph, he linked the rise of Islamophobia to elements of the media and to some politicians. "Some police officers and sections of the media are demonising Muslims, treating them as if they're all terrorists — and that encourages other people to do the same", he said.

He contrasted the one-dimensional portrayal of the Muslim population with the treatment of Catholics in Britain in the 20th century: "We shouldn't say Muslim terrorists; it stigmatises the whole community. We never called the IRA Catholic terrorists." He argued that the British government's response to violent extremism had created tensions both within the Muslim population and between it and the rest of society, and warned of the consequences of poisoning people's minds against an entire community, as happened in Nazi Germany in the 1930s.

Abdul Bari often writes about family and parenting, as well as social, political, and global issues, in The Huffington Post and Al Jazeera English. On parenting, he urges the involvement of both mothers and fathers, calling them the "grass-root leaders for every generation of newcomers on earth".

In April 2016, the propaganda magazine of ISIS (Daesh) published a hit list of Muslim leaders in the West calling to "Kill the Imams of Kufr (the infidels) in the West". His name was among five in the UK.

== Personal life ==
Abdul Bari's interests include reading and travelling. He speaks Bengali and English fluently and is married with four children.

== Books ==
- Abdul Bari, Muhammad (2002). Building Muslim Families: Challenges and Expectations. Ta-Ha Publishers. ISBN 978-1-84200-041-0.
- —— (2002). The Greatest Gift: A Guide to Parenting from an Islamic Perspective. Ta-Ha Publishers. ISBN 978-1-84200-044-1.
- —— (2005). Race, Religion, & Muslim Identity in Britain. Renaissance Press. ISBN 978-0-9543294-7-1.
- —— (2007). Marriage and Family Building in Islam. Ta-Ha Publishers. ISBN 978-1-84200-083-0.
- —— (2011). Addressing Adolescence: A Guide to Parenting in Islam. Ta-Ha Publishers. ISBN 978-1-84200-125-7.
- —— (2012). British, Muslims, Citizens: Introspection and Renewal. Consilium Publishing. ISBN 978-1-62095-097-5.
- —— (2013). Meet the Challenge, Make the Change: A call to action for Muslim civil society in Britain. Cordoba Foundation. OCLC 855349248.
- —— (2015). Cherishing Childhood: A Guide to Parenting in Islam. Ta-Ha Publishers. ISBN 978-1-84200-154-7.
- —— (2018). The Rohingya Crisis: A People Facing Extinction. Kube Publishing. ISBN 9781847741240.
- —— (2018). A Long Jihad: My Quest for the Middle Way. Kube Publishing. ISBN 9781847741172.
- —— (2021). Muslim Parenting (Bangla ed.). Guardian Publications. ISBN 9789849537083.
- —— (2022). Preparing for Life: How to Help One's Children Become Mature and Responsible Adults. Kube Publishing. ISBN 9781847741875.

eBooks

- —— (2022). Saving Our Planet: How citizens can thwart a climate calamity. Amazon. ASIN B0BQZ96ZNM.
- —— (2021). How to bring justice for Palestinians. Amazon. ASIN B09J95SZBR.
- —— (2021). Chaotic Global Politics: Muslims in the News: Collected Writings of a British Muslim Leader 2011-2017. Kube Publishing. ASIN B09N2ZGDYM.
- —— (2021). Going to Extremes: Muslims in the News: Collected Writings of a British Muslim Leader 2011-2017. Kube Publishing. ASIN B09N2Z719W.
- —— (2021). British & Believing: Muslims in the News: Collected Writings of a British Muslim Leader 2011-2017. Kube Publishing. ASIN B098D84N1S.
- —— (2021). Reflections of British Society: Muslims in the News: Collected Writings of a British Muslim Leader 2011-2017. Kube Publishing. ASIN B09N317RXS.

== See also ==
- British Bangladeshi
- List of British Bangladeshis

Titles in Islam
Preceded by Iqbal Sacranie	Secretary-General of the Muslim Council of Britain; 2006–2010	Succeeded by Farooq Murad
