= Westwood Mosque =

Mosque in Oldham, United Kingdom

Religion
- Affiliation: Sunni Islam
- Leadership: Khateeb: Kawsar Ahmed
- Year consecrated: 1990
- Status: active

Location
- Location: Neville Street, Oldham, Greater Manchester, England
- State: England
- Interactive map of Westwood Mosque
- Coordinates: 53.543996°N 2.1328551°W

Architecture
- Type: Mosque
- Construction cost: £2.2 million (Compass House)

Website
- www.westwoodmosque.org

Westwood Mosque (also known as Oldham Muslim Centre) is a mosque located in Oldham, Greater Manchester, United Kingdom. Plans to establish the centre began in 1990, when property was acquired on Chadderton Way, prior moving to the Compass House in 2010.

== See also ==
- East London Mosque
- Islamic Forum of Europe
- Islam in the United Kingdom
- British Bangladeshis
- Islamic schools and branches
