= A New Account of the Tales of the World =

5th-century historical compilation by Liu Yiqing

- Traditional Chinese: 世說新語
- Simplified Chinese: 世说新语
Transcriptions
Standard Mandarin
- Hanyu Pinyin: shìshuō xīnyǔ
- Wade–Giles: Shih-shuo Hsin-yu
Yue: Cantonese
- Jyutping: Sai3syut3 San1jyu5

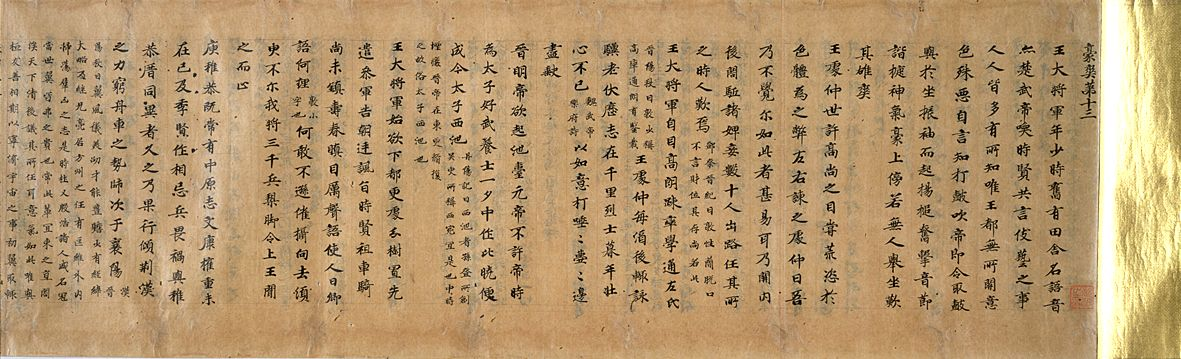
Part of the oldest extant transcription of A New Account of the Tales of the World, 7th-8th century, now located in the Tokyo National Museum.

A New Account of the Tales of the World, also known as Shishuo Xinyu (Chinese: 世說新語 (Note: While the name of this work is sometimes shortened to Shiyu, it is not to be confused with Wei Jin Shiyu (魏晋世語), another work whose name is sometimes shortened to Shiyu as well.)), was compiled and edited by Liu Yiqing (Chinese: 劉義慶; 403 – 26 February 444), a nephew of Liu Yu, during the Liu Song dynasty (420–479) of the Northern and Southern dynasties. It is a historical compilation of anecdotes about Chinese scholars, musicians, and artists during the 2nd-4th centuries.

== Content ==
The book contains around 1,130 historical anecdotes and character sketches of around 600 literati, musicians and painters who lived in the Han and Wei–Jin periods (2nd-4th centuries). Chapter 19, for instance, has 32 stories about outstanding women. It is thus both a biographical source and a record of colloquial language. The original text of the book was divided into eight volumes of juan (卷 "scroll"), though current editions generally span ten volumes.

== Reception ==
While most of the anecdotes and personalities are attested in other sources, traditional Chinese bibliographers did not classify Shishuo Xinyu as history, but as a novel / "minor tales" (小說 xiao shuo), a term that was later used to refer to fiction. Some attribute this to its use of colloquial language as well as how it did not follow the historical conventions of the Twenty-Four Histories. The mixture of literary and vernacular styles set the scene for the later tradition of informal Chinese literature. The 20th-century Chinese novelist Lu Xun spoke highly of the book's aesthetic merits.

== Translations ==
The text was fully translated into English in 2002, with annotations and commentary by Liang dynasty scholar Liu Xiaobiao (劉孝標; 462 - 521 or 463 - 522), (Note: Liu Jun (刘峻; "Xiaobiao" was his courtesy name) has biographies in vol.50 of Liang Shu and vol.49 of Nan Shi. While both biographies recorded that Liu died at the age of 60 (by East Asian reckoning), Liang Shu recorded that he died in the 2nd year of the Putong era, whereas Nan Shi recorded that he died in the 3rd year of that era.) (Note: Together with the commentaries Shuijing zhu (by Li Daoyuan), Pei Songzhi's Sanguozhi zhu, and Li Shan's Wen Xuan zhu, Liu Xiaobiao's work is regarded as one of the “Four Great Classical Commentaries” of China.) by sinologist Richard B. Mather, in the book titled Shih-shuo Hsin-yü: A New Account of Tales of the World.

== Extant versions ==
Manuscript:

- Hand-written fragments from the Tang dynasty (618–907) (唐寫本殘卷)

Woodblock prints:

- Dong Fen edition, 1138 (8th year of the Shaoxing era of the Southern Song); original kept in Japan (南宋紹興八年董弅刊本，原本存於日本)
- Edition by Lu You, 1188 (15th year of the Chunxi era of the Southern Song; 南宋淳熙十五年陸游刻本)
- Edition from Hunan, 1189 (16th year of Chunxi) (淳熙十六年湘中刻本)

== Categories ==
1. Virtuous Conduct 德行第一
2. Speech and Conversation 言語第二
3. Affairs of State 政事第三
4. Letters and Scholarship 文學第四
5. The Square and the Proper 方正第五
6. Cultivated Tolerance 雅量第六
7. Insight and Judgment 識鑑第七
8. Appreciation and Praise 賞譽第八
9. Grading Excellence 品藻第九
10. Admonitions and Warnings 規箴第十
11. Quick Perception 捷悟第十一
12. Precocious Intelligence 夙惠第十二
13. Virility and Boldness 豪爽第十三
14. Appearance and Manner 容止第十四
15. Self-renewal 自新第十五
16. Admiration and Emulation 企羨第十六
17. Grieving for the Departed 傷逝第十七
18. Reclusion and Disengagement 栖逸第十八
19. Worthy Beauties 賢媛第十九
20. Technical Understanding 術解第二十
21. Skill and Art 巧藝第二十一
22. Favor and Veneration 寵禮第二十二
23. The Free and Unrestrained 任誕第二十三
24. Rudeness and Arrogance 簡傲第二十四
25. Taunting and Teasing 排調第二十五
26. Contempt and Insults 輕詆第二十六
27. Guile and Chicanery 假譎第二十七
28. Dismissal from Office 黜免第二十八
29. Stinginess and Meanness 儉嗇第二十九
30. Extravagance and Ostentation 汰侈第三十
31. Anger and Irascibility 忿狷第三十一
32. Slander and Treachery 讒險第三十二
33. Blameworthiness and Remorse 尤悔第三十三
34. Crudities and Slips of the Tongue 紕漏第三十四
35. Delusion and Infatuation 惑溺第三十五
36. Hostility and Alienation 仇隙第三十六
