= Wilhelm Haas =

German diplomat (1896–1981)

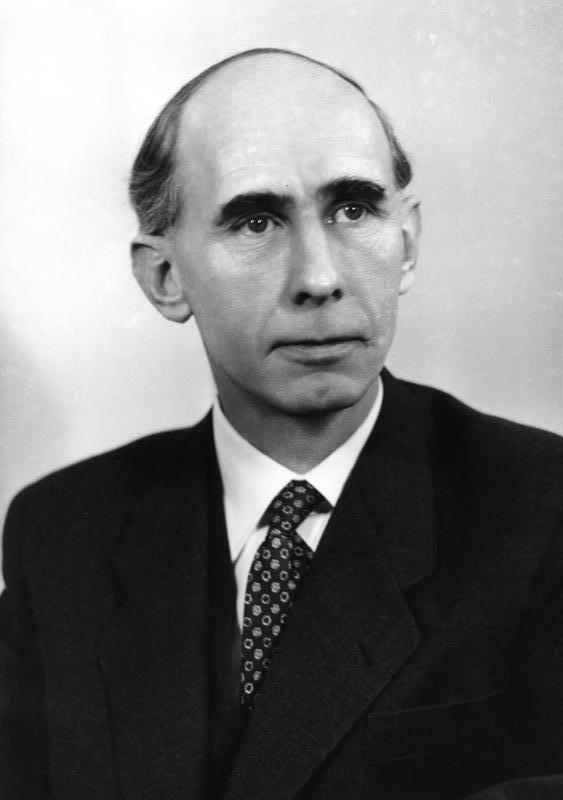
- Haas in 1951
- Born: 4 September 1896; Bremen, German Empire
- Died: 11 January 1981 (aged 84); Bremen, West Germany
- Education: University of Marburg; University of Freiburg
- Occupation: Diplomat
- Spouse(s): Ursula Corwegh (?–1981; his death)
- Children: 4 sons, including Wilhelm Haas
- Awards: Grand Cross of Merit with Star (1954); Order of the Rising Sun, 1st Class (1961)

Wilhelm Haas (4 September 1896 – 11 January 1981) was a German diplomat. He served during the Weimar Republic, was dismissed during the Nazi era due to his wife's Jewish heritage, and later became a prominent ambassador for the Federal Republic of Germany (West Germany). His ambassadorships included posts in Turkey, the Soviet Union, and Japan.

== Early life and education ==
Wilhelm Haas was born in Bremen on 4 September 1896, the son of a merchant from an Evangelical (Protestant) family. He attended the Neues Gymnasium in Bremen. From August 1914 to January 1919, he served as a soldier in World War I, reaching the rank of Leutnant (Lieutenant).

After the war, Haas studied Law at the University of Marburg and the University of Freiburg. He completed an internship at a shipping company and passed the first state law examination (Referendarexamen) in 1921. He earned his doctorate in law in 1922.

== Diplomatic career ==
=== Weimar Republic and early Nazi era ===
Haas joined the German Foreign Office as an Attaché in 1922. His early postings included Paris (1924), Addis Ababa (as Legation Secretary, 1925), the Consulate General in Shanghai (1927), and the legation in Peking (1929). He also served as secretary to the German League of Nations delegation in Geneva.

In 1933, following the Nazi seizure of power, Haas was forced out of his position as managing director of the re-founded German-Japanese Society (Deutsch-Japanische Gesellschaft, DJG). This was part of the Gleichschaltung (coordination) process, aimed at bringing organizations in line with Nazi ideology. The pretext was that Haas's wife, Ursula (née Corwegh; 1907–1994), was of Jewish descent. He was replaced by Friedrich Hack and Sakai Naoe.

Despite this, Haas was appointed Commercial Attaché and head of the economic department at the German embassy in Tokyo in 1934, under Ambassador Herbert von Dirksen. However, he faced increasing antisemitic hostility from Nazi Party members within the embassy, particularly targeting his wife. Pressure from these elements led to his forced retirement from the diplomatic service in 1937.

=== World War II ===
Through the intervention of Herbert von Dirksen, Haas secured a position as a representative for IG Farben in Peking, which was then part of the Japanese puppet state of Manchukuo. This allowed him and his family to remain in China during World War II. During this period Haas hosted a group of German-speakers based in the city who kept apart from the rest of the German emigré community in Peking. Sharing an interest in developing an understanding of certain aspects of Chinese thought, Haas asked Hellmut Wilhelm to present a series of lectures on the I Ching.

=== Post-war career ===
After the end of the war, Haas was interned locally in China. He returned to Germany via Switzerland in 1947. Upon his return, he became a Staatsrat (State Councilor) in the Senate of Bremen.

In 1949, Haas was seconded to the Federal Chancellery in Bonn. From 25 November 1949, he headed the "Organisationsbüro für die konsularisch-wirtschaftliche Vertretung im Ausland" (Organizational Office for Consular and Economic Representation Abroad), tasked with planning the structure and staffing of West Germany's future foreign service. As head of personnel during the initial formation of the new Foreign Office, Haas presented his concept in December 1950. His guiding principles were to minimize the hiring of individuals heavily implicated in the Nazi-era Foreign Office while ensuring sufficient expertise, and to include female applicants.

The Foreign Office was formally re-established on 15 March 1951, separate from the Chancellery, with Chancellor Konrad Adenauer also serving as the first Foreign Minister. Haas initially continued as Personnel Chief. However, in the summer of 1951, he clashed with Adenauer over the Chancellor's attempts to appoint CDU party members to diplomatic posts despite their lack of qualifications. Haas refused to approve these appointments and was subsequently dismissed from his post as Personnel Chief in July 1951. He was succeeded by Herbert Dittmann.

=== Ambassadorial posts ===
Despite the conflict with Adenauer, Haas returned to diplomatic service:

- Turkey: In May 1952, he became West Germany's first ambassador to Turkey, based in Ankara. He served until 1956.
- Soviet Union: Following the re-establishment of diplomatic relations, Haas was appointed ambassador to the Soviet Union in Moscow in 1956. During his tenure, he was reportedly critical of Chancellor Adenauer's policy towards the Eastern Bloc. He served until 1958.
- Japan: From 1958 until his retirement in 1961, Haas served as ambassador to Japan in Tokyo.

== Later life and honors ==
After retiring from the diplomatic service, Haas served as president of the German Association for East European Studies (Deutsche Gesellschaft für Osteuropakunde) until autumn 1971.

Haas received several honors:

- Grand Cross of Merit with Star (Großes Bundesverdienstkreuz mit Stern) of the Federal Republic of Germany (1954).
- Order of the Rising Sun, First Class, from Japan upon his departure in 1961.

The city of Bremen named a street after him, Wilhelm-Haas-Straße, in the St. Magnus district where he lived.

Wilhelm Haas died in Bremen on 11 January 1981.

== Personal life ==
Wilhelm Haas married Ursula Corwegh (1907–1994). They had four sons. One of their sons, Wilhelm Haas (18 August 1931 – 18 October 2024), also became a diplomat. He attended Bowdoin College (Class of 1953) – his graduation year sometimes being mistakenly associated with his father – before pursuing law in Germany and joining the foreign service. He served as the German Ambassador to Israel (1985–c. 1990), Japan (1990–1994), and the Netherlands (1994–1996). While ambassador to Israel, he received an honorary Doctor of Laws (LL.D.) degree from Bowdoin in 1988.

== Writings ==
- Haas, Wilhelm (1969). Beitrag zur Geschichte der Entstehung des Auswärtigen Dienstes der Bundesrepublik Deutschland [Contribution to the History of the Formation of the Foreign Service of the Federal Republic of Germany]. Introduction by the Foreign Office. Bremen: Private printing (financed by the Foreign Office). (Cited in: "AUSWÄRTIGES AMT / NS-DIPLOMATEN: Jemand im Hause". Der Spiegel (14/1971). 28 March 1971.)
