= Norman Howard Cliff =

British Protestant author

Norman Howard Cliff (1925–2007) was a British Protestant author who wrote about Christianity and the history of Protestant missions in China.

== Biography ==
Cliff was born in 1925 in Yantai (formerly, Chefoo) to Howard and Mary Cliff, both pharmacists who were working as missionaries with the China Inland Mission (CIM). As part of the Chefoo School, a boarding school of the CIM, Cliff was interned by the Japanese at the Weixian Internment Camp from 1943 until 1945, when the camp was freed by American paratroopers.

Cliff later went on to pursue a B.A. from the University of South Africa and a B.Com. from Rhodes University. He worked as a minister and an accountant for the United Reformed Church in South Africa, before returning to Britain due to poor health. Back in the UK, Cliff earned an MPhil at the Open University in 1983, writing a thesis on the theology of Watchman Nee, and a PhD at Buckingham University in 1995, writing a thesis on the history of Protestant missions in Shandong Province.

== Works authored ==
- Prisoners of the Samurai: Japanese Civilian Camps, 1941-1945
- Fierce the Conflict (2001)
- White Cliffs of Hangzhou
- Life and Theology of Watchman Nee : Including a Study of the Little Flock
- A Heart for China: The Gripping Story of Benjamin Broomhall
- A Flame of Sacred Love
- Courtyard of the Happy Way
