= Chefoo School =

Christian boarding school in China

China Inland Mission "Chefoo School" (Protestant Collegiate School)
- from Yantai to Kuling, Jiujiang

Information
- Type: Private Boarding
- Motto: In Deo Fidimus and Nihil Absque Labore
- Religious affiliation: Protestant Christian
- Established: in 1881 in Yantai
- Closed: in 1951 in Kuling, Jiujiang
- Athletics: Football (soccer), rowing, cricket, tennis

School building

School in 1903

The Chefoo Girls' School circa 1893

Students doing sports

School in winter

The Chefoo School (traditional Chinese: 芝罘學校; simplified Chinese: 芝罘学校; pinyin: Zhīfú Xuéxiào; Wade–Giles: Chih-fu Hsüeh-hsiao), also known as Protestant Collegiate School or China Inland Mission School, was a Christian boarding school established in 1881 by the China Inland Mission—under James Hudson Taylor—at Chefoo (Yantai), in Shandong province in northern China. Its purpose was to provide an education for the children of foreign missionaries and the foreign business and diplomatic communities in China.

Chefoo School was described by a former student: "On the rising ground looking out across a sleepy, sun-kissed bay, there stood a group of rambling, ivy-covered, neo-Gothic buildings...For nearly fifty years these gracious, elegant, mellowing buildings were the home of a great English boarding school...where children of missionaries from all over China and children of other foreign residents received a Bible-oriented, English 'public school' education up to Oxford Certificate level...the School survived the Boxer Rebellion, plague, tropical diseases, bandits and piracy on the China seas, but its greatest test came in the nineteen forties" during World War II. During the war the Japanese army took control of the school, and the students and staff were moved to the Weihsien Internment Camp. At the end of the war in 1945, the students and staff did not return to Chefoo, although "Chefoo Schools" were established in other locations. The last campus of Chefoo school in China was in Kuling, Jiujiang. Chefoo School Kuling Campus was established in 1947 and survived until 1951 when it was closed by the Chinese communist government.

The Chefoo School called itself "the best school east of Suez."

== Origin and history ==
Hudson Taylor founded the China Inland Mission (CIM) (after 1964 OMF International) in England in 1865 and it became the largest Protestant missionary organization in China. A major problem for missionaries was the education of their children. Most British and American missionaries sent their children back to their home countries for education which meant separations of the parents from their children for years. Taylor, however, had made a commitment that the children of CIM missionaries would be given a British education in China. In 1879, he purchased land from farmers for a school near the picturesque sea port of Chefoo (later Yantai) and in 1881 Chefoo school opened with three students. The Chefoo School grew rapidly and in 1905 had 226 boys and 193 girls enrolled from China Inland Mission parents. In addition, the school admitted a few children of other missionary organizations, businessmen, and other Europeans working in China.

The name of the school was initially the "Protestant Collegiate School." By 1908 it was called the "China Inland Mission school," but later it was usually called the "Chefoo School." Chefoo was a boarding school with students from all over China, many of whom had to travel for weeks to get to the school from where their parents were stationed. In 1940, in one exceptional case, 6-year-old David Michell left his parents' home in remote Guiyang on 8 October and travelling by truck, railroad, and ship, accompanied by other students and teacher escorts and delayed by the war between Japan and China, did not arrive in Chefoo until January 1941.

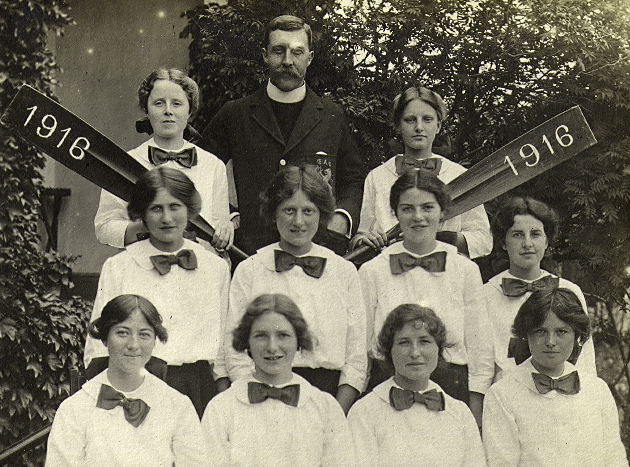
China Inland Mission Chefoo School Girls Rowing in the Year 1916

Chefoo had three departments—the Boys', Girls', and Preparatory School. In 1886 the Boys' and Girls' schools were separated. "In 1895 a Preparatory School for children aged 6 to 10 was opened and in 1896 a new Boys' School (ages 11 to 16) was built and enlargements made to the Girls' School (also ages 11 to 16) which opened in 1898. Head Master Pat Bruce (1930-1945) made significant changes at Chefoo such as the introduction of co-education in 1934; the construction of a new teaching and preparatory bloc; the creation of the Chefoo Orchestra in 1930; the teaching of Chinese Studies; and the beginning of a Girl Guides company. In 1936, Chefoo School adopted the Chinese dolphin as its crest." The curriculum was British, focused on preparing Chefoo students for entrance to British universities. There was a heavy emphasis on religion with daily prayers and two church services on Sunday. All the teachers were CIM missionaries. Sports such as rowing, soccer, cricket, tennis and swimming were popular.

Political chaos in China after 1925, the ongoing civil war between communists and the Chinese government, the invasion of China by Japan in 1937, and the beginning of World War II in Europe in 1939 caused many missionaries and other foreigners to leave China. Nevertheless, in 1940, the Chefoo school still had a student body of 338 students.

== In China but not of China ==
In the first decade of the Chefoo School, several children of mixed European/Chinese parentage unofficially attended the Chefoo School; however, by 1891, mixed-blood students were effectively, if not officially, banned from attending. Many Chefoo students had learned to speak Chinese at home from servants while toddlers, but speaking Chinese at the school was banned for many years, and many forgot the Chinese they had spoken when younger. Study of Chinese culture and language was not offered to students until 1917 and was not mandatory until 1934. "We were in a British compound in the middle of China," said one former student, "and we [might as well] have been in London." CIM policy demanded that its missionaries wear Chinese clothing and live a Chinese lifestyle, but the children of CIM missionaries attended a school in which an objective was to prepare the students for an elite higher education in England—an education and elite status many of their parents did not have. CIM missionary parents were concerned about the professional futures of their children which might be compromised if they did not receive a British education.

The parents of CIM children also feared the "polluting" and unhealthy environment their children experienced in China in their pre-school years. The Chinese environment was "conducive neither to health of body nor purity of minds." Many diseases were rampant in China and deaths from disease in missionary families were common. Isolating Chefoo students from contact with Chinese helped keep the school free of disease. The school's promotional literature advertised that "there are no Chinese houses within a mile or so." Fear of disease, however, did not prevent the Chefoo school from employing many Chinese as servants and workers.

== World War II ==
In July 1937, Japan initiated war with China, a forerunner of World War II. Because of the war some students were unable to visit their families in other parts of China while others left the school to return to their family homes and did not return. The day after the Japanese attack on Pearl Harbor on 7 December 1941, the Japanese visited the school and arrested the headmaster and imprisoned him for a month. Lacking access to funds, the school dismissed most of the Chinese staff and rationed food. The Japanese encroached on the school and slowly took over the buildings for the use of their army. On 5 November 1942 all the remaining students and staff were forced to leave. With a few belongings they walked to Temple Hill, an abandoned missionary compound in the city of Chefoo, and there were housed in crowded conditions until September 1943.

The number of Chefoo staff and students interned at Temple Hill was 252 of whom 77 were adults and 175 were children. One hundred and fourteen of the children were separated from their parents. Ninety of the unaccompanied children were British (including Canadians, Australians, etc.) Forty-seven of this total, all Americans, were repatriated to the United States in September 1943, leaving 205 interned "Chefusians," nearly all British, including 96 unaccompanied children. (One additional child was born later and one student died of an accident in Weihsien.)

In September 1943, the staff and students of Chefoo school were loaded onto first a ship and later trucks and transported to the Weihsien Civilian Assembly Center, an internment camp located in the interior part of Shandong province. There, they would remain for two years until the end of the war.

=== Weihsien ===
The Chefoo students arriving at Weihsien "had grown up in a very cloistered, old-fashioned, Bible-reading, soul-saving religious community." In Weihsien they found themselves members of a community of 1,500 people, mostly British and from all walks of life: businessmen, scholars, Roman Catholic priests, liberal Christians, an African-American jazz band, and more than a few prostitutes, derelicts, and criminals. An internee described the dilapidated compound, about 6 acres (2.4 ha) in size, as "bare walls, bare floors, dim electric lights, no running water, primitive latrines, two houses with showers, three huge public kitchens, a desecrated church, and a dismantled hospital." A Japanese commandant and 40 guards provided meager food and fuel to the internees, but mostly left the internees alone to sort out the details of their confined lives.

The Chefoo staff attempted, mostly with success, to keep the Chefoo students isolated from other internees. They had their own school, separate from the several schools attended by other children in the camp. Romances and friendships between Chefoo students and other children in the camp were broken up by the teachers. Student Mary Previte said that she never feared for her own safety in the camp, although rumors circulated among the adults that the Japanese were going to kill all the internees. Academic standards were maintained. Thirty-seven Chefoo students took the School Certificate Examination while in the camp and 34 passed, becoming eligible for admission to Britain's best universities.

Protestant theologian Langdon Gilkey, however, was less than complimentary about the conservative Protestants, mostly from Chefoo, whom he knew at Weihsien. The "frequent Protestant reaction [was] of moral disapproval, and of spiritual if not physical withdrawal." They "typically huddled together...kept to their own flock of saved souls, evidently because they feared to be contaminated...by this sinful world."

=== Rescue ===
Six American soldiers and a Chinese interpreter parachuted into Weihsien on August 17, 1945. Unknown to the internees, three days earlier the Japanese had announced their surrender, but another two weeks would pass before the surrender papers were signed. The paratroopers were sent by the Office of Strategic Services the forerunner of the CIA, to liberate the internees. Unable to land in the compound because of the guards, they made a low drop from a B-24 into a nearby cornfield. A Salvation Army band began playing "The Star-Spangled Banner" and the prisoners hoisted their rescuers onto their shoulders. Suddenly, unexpectedly, the war was over for them, and they were free. Chefoo student Mary Previte recalled: "The camp went berserk. We didn't know the war was over, people were dancing, weeping, pounding the ground." The Japanese guards at the camp surrendered.

It was late September before the Chefoo students were able to leave Weihsien. The 96 students who had been separated from their parents were transported by the U.S. and British militaries to the places where their families were located. Kathleen Strange and Joyce Kerry reunited with their families in England in December. They had not seen their families for five years and Strange did not recognize her mother. Both were uncomfortable with embraces by their family members. Kerry said, "No one had touched me in years and I felt uncomfortable and embarrassed." David Michell reunited with his family in Australia in November, not having seen them for more than six years.

=== Student views ===
Former Chefoo students shared differing views on the school. "The best ten years of my life," said one. Others said, "one big happy family," and "a wonderful atmosphere of sheer joyful faith, understanding, infinite patience, and love of the staff." The negative views included: "a Public School transplanted to the East with vast overdoses of religion" and "an isolated and abnormal society, fascinating but not healthy." One of the students, Mary Previte, later described the characteristics of the school as "ritual, predictability, and safety which was our salvation" by enabling the students to survive the rigors of imprisonment by the Japanese. Another student, Kathleen Strange, lamenting the long years separated from her parents, criticized the sternness of the school and the lack of affection from teachers. "We were never hugged, we never sat on anyone's lap, we were never kissed."

== After WWII ==
After the war, the Communist forces occupied north China and the school never returned to Chefoo. During the war, branches of the Chefoo School were temporarily opened at (Kiating) (1941–1944) (in a part of China not occupied by Japan), Kalimpong, India (1944–1946) and Shanghai (1946–1947). In 1947, the CIM purchased the buildings of the defunct Kuling American School in Kuling, Jiujiang, a hill station and rest and recreation community for missionaries. Students and staff gradually gathered at the school in Kuling. By the first summer, there were 126 students. By May 1949, Communist forces had occupied Kuling. The school continued until 1951 when the China Inland Mission decided to withdraw completely from China. Staff and students of Chefoo School withdrew to Hong Kong between February and April 1951, where missionary parents waited for their children.

Following the redeployment of missionaries throughout east Asia, new Chefoo schools were established in Japan (1951–1998), Malaya/Malaysia (1952–2001), Thailand (1952–1954), Taiwan (1954–1961), and the Philippines (1956–1981). Chefoo School Malaysia, which was based on the outskirts of Brinchang at the Cameron Highlands, was the longest running and last surviving post-war Chefoo School when it ceased function as a school in June 2001. The compound was subsequently transferred to the Methodist Church in Malaysia and was repurposed as the Methodist Centennial Chefoo Centre, a church-run retreat and hostel opened in 2009 following extensive renovation.

The Chefoo Schools Association was founded in 1908 to operate as an association for all former students and past and present members of staff of the Chefoo Schools. A magazine entitled Chefoo (organ of the Chefoo Schools Association) was first published in 1908, and continued until 2018.

== Chefoo School Students circa 1911-16 ==
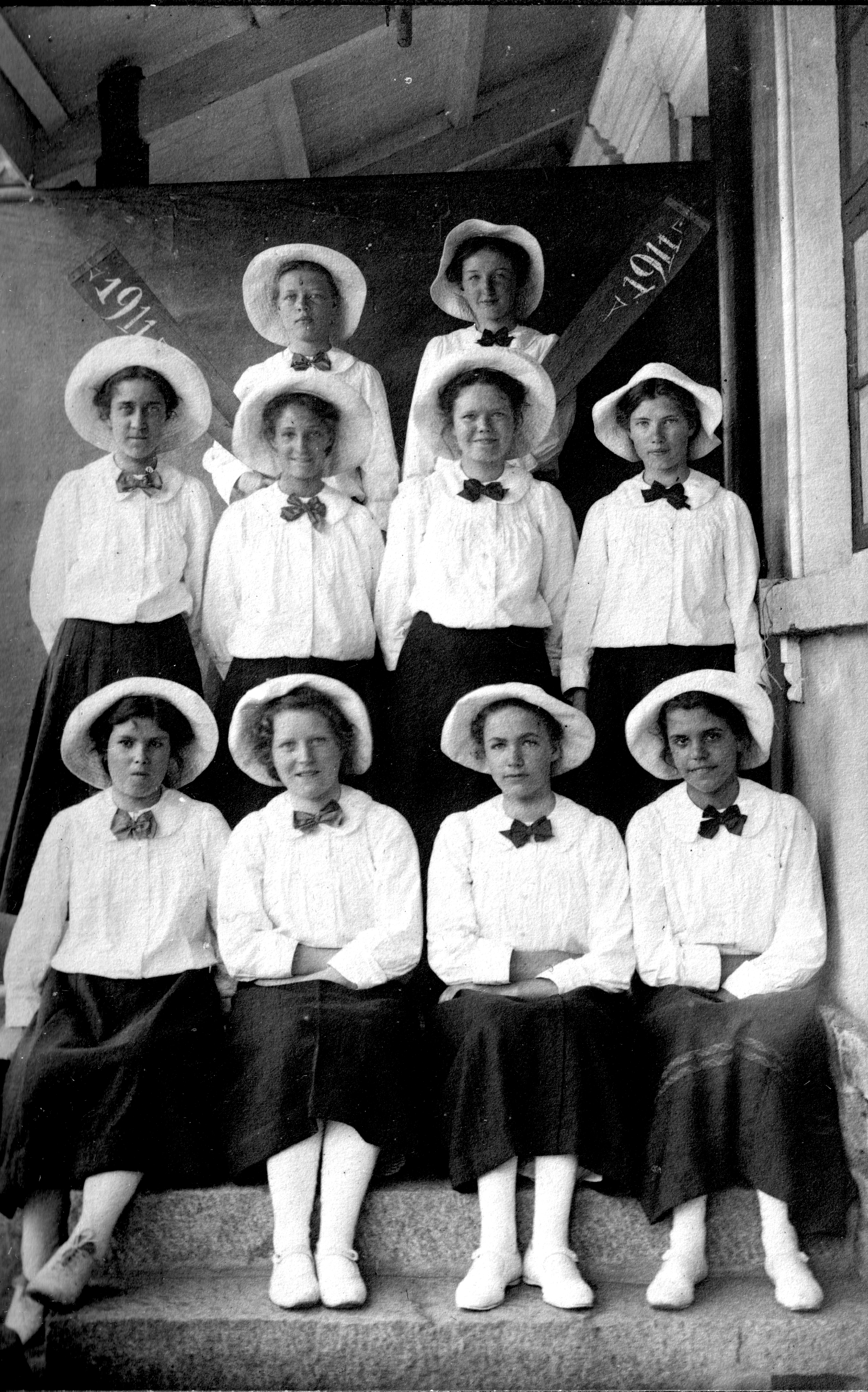

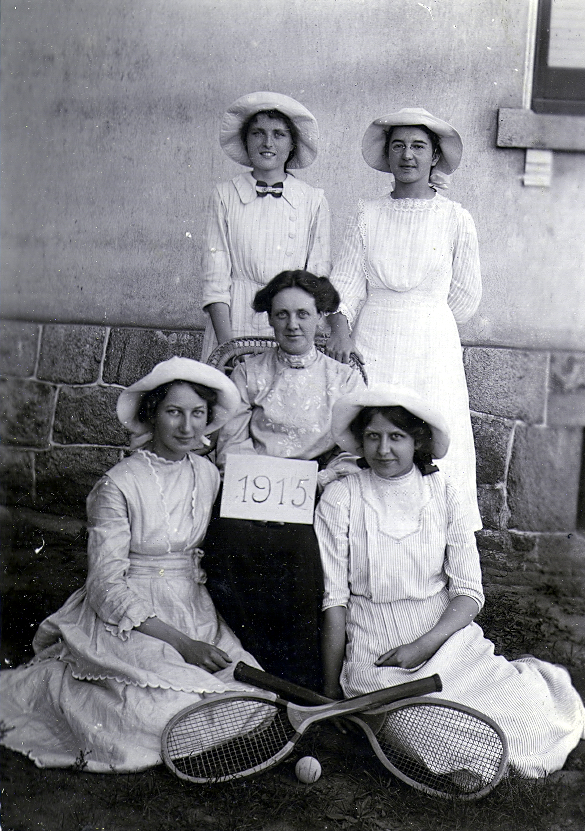

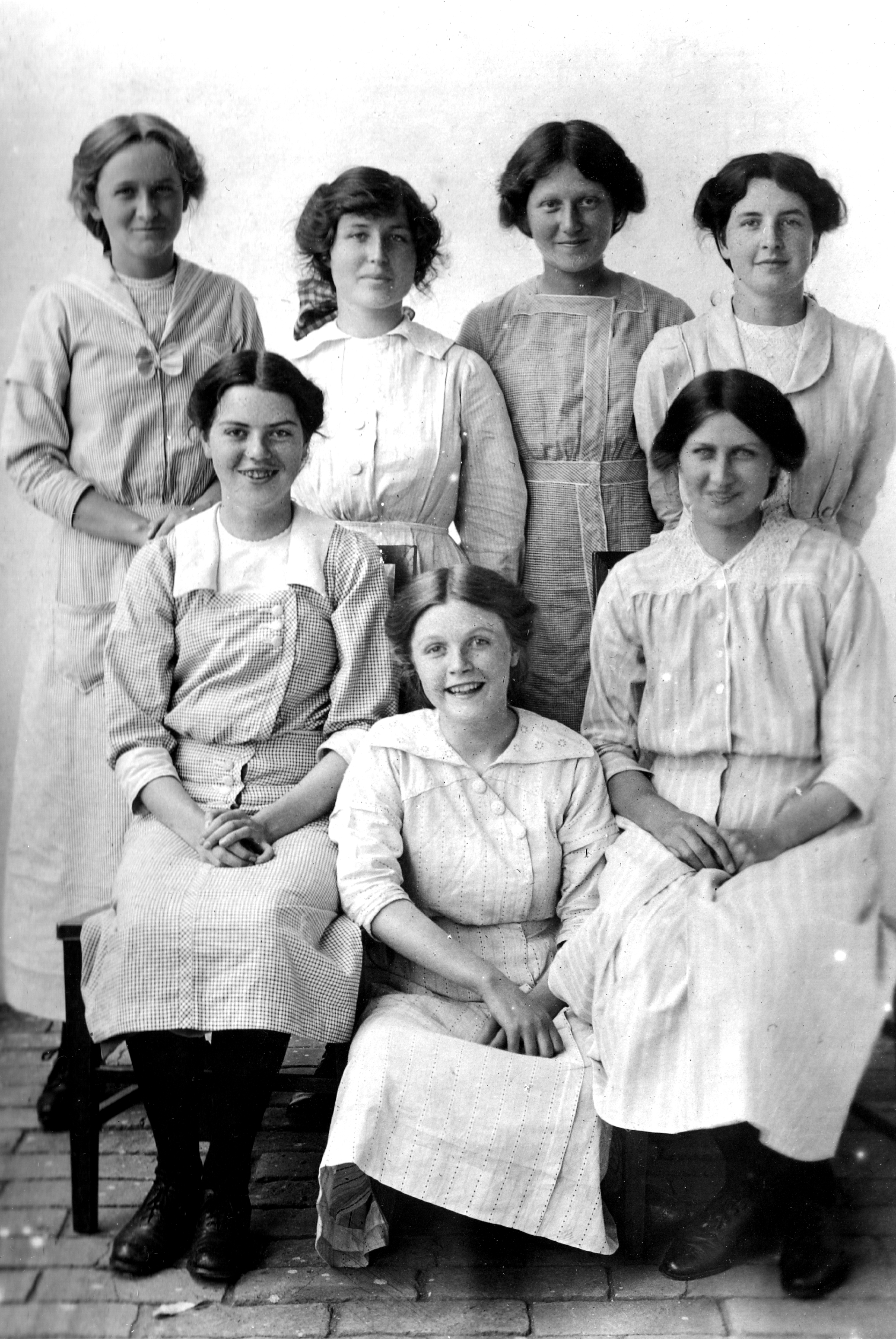

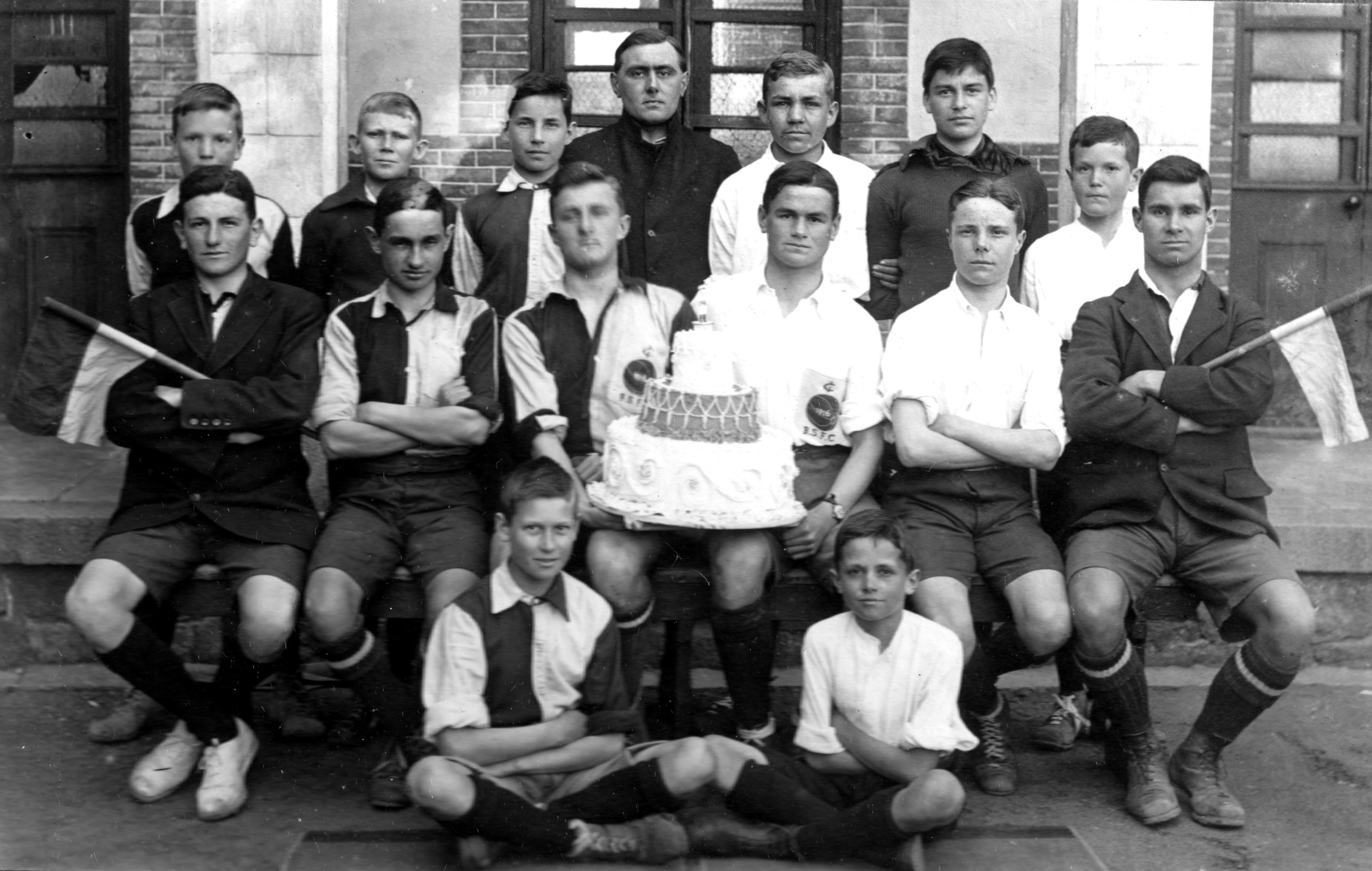

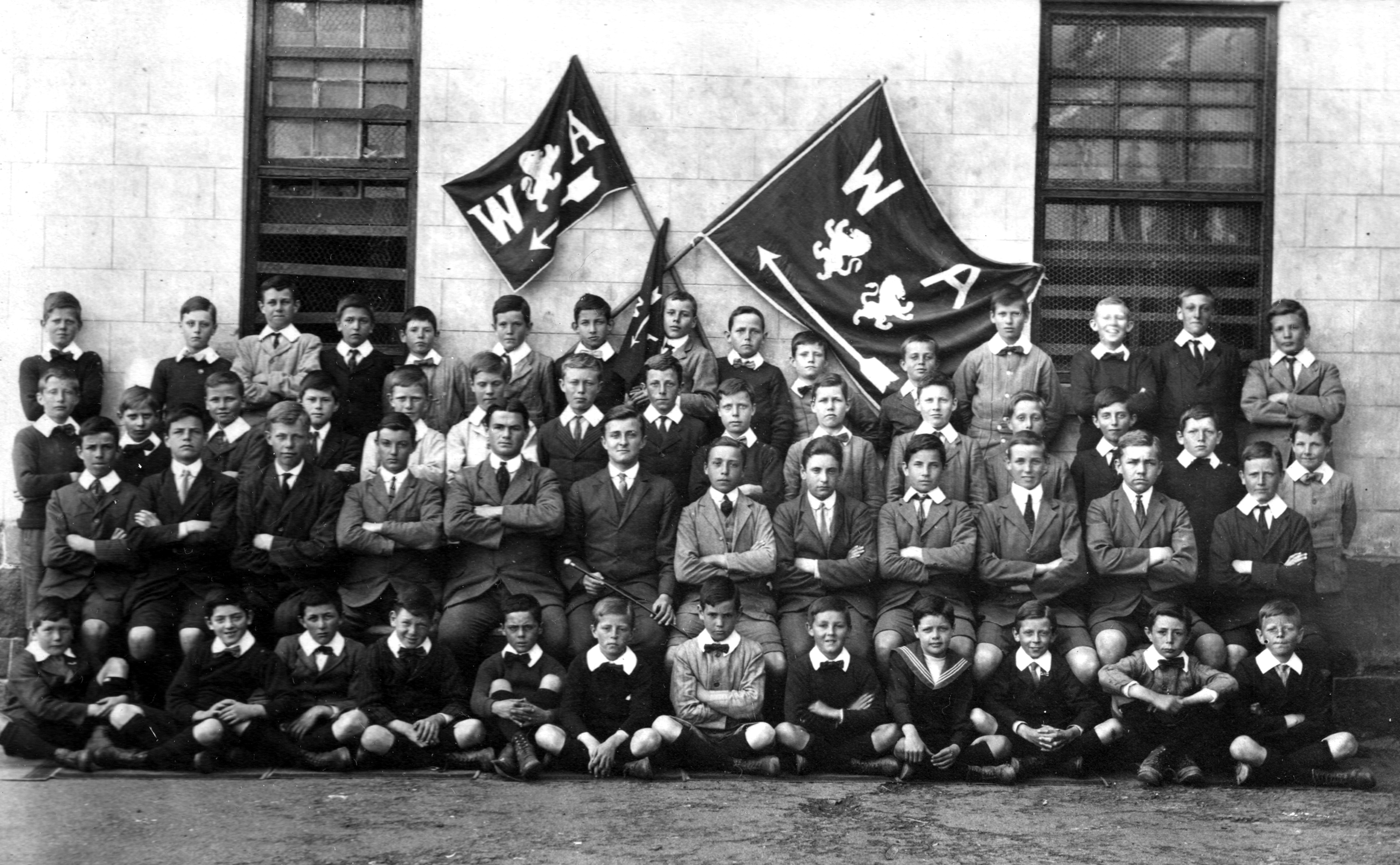

== Notable alumni ==
- Victoria Clare Attisha (née Emslie), first western female physician in Iraq from 1930 to 1970
- Alfred James Broomhall, missionary to China, historian and author
- Norman Howard Cliff, author
- Catherine Honor Harlow, O.B.E., former director, UK Department of Employment and Productivity
- Luther Carrington Goodrich, Sinologist and Columbia University professor.
- Martyn King, youngest pilot killed in the Battle of Britain .
- Henry Luce, American publisher
- Frank Newman (Edward Francis Southan Newman, 1873–1937), of the Imperial Post Office, China.
- Mary Previte, author of Hungry Ghosts, served in the New Jersey General Assembly representing the 6th legislative district from 1998 to 2006.
- Ida Pruitt, social worker and author
- Paul Thompson (sinologist), Sinologist
- Thornton Wilder, American playwright and novelist
- J. Dudley Woodberry, professor and scholar of Islam and Christian missions
- Howard Alexander Hatton, Born in Yunnan, China. Linguist, translator and prolific biblical scholar (Thailand Bible Society, United and American Bible Societies), OMF missionary and son of China Inland Missionaries, Frederick and Dora (Kidd) Hatton.
