= Erwin von Zach =

Austrian diplomat (1872–1942)

Ritter Erwin von Zach
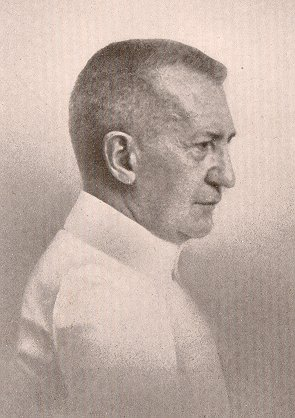
- von Zach (c. 1935)
- Born: 18 April 1872; Vienna, Austria-Hungary
- Died: 19 January 1942 (aged 69); Indian Ocean, West of Sumatra
- Education: University of Vienna
- Known for: Chinese literature, Wen xuan translation

Chinese name
- Traditional Chinese: 贊克
- Simplified Chinese: 赞克
Transcriptions
Standard Mandarin
- Hanyu Pinyin: Zàn Kè
- Wade–Giles: Tzan^{4} K'o^{4}

Erwin Julius Ritter von Zach (18 April 1872 – 19 January 1942) was an Austrian-Hungary diplomat and sinologist noted for his studies of Chinese literature and its translation, as well as his often harsh criticism of other scholars' work. His German translations of the early Chinese anthology Selections of Refined Literature (Wen xuan 文選) and the collected poems of Li Bai and Han Yu are still the only complete translations into a Western language; he also translated the collected poems of Du Fu.

He was the second consul of the Austro-Hungarian concession of Tianjin.

== Early life ==
Erwin von Zach was born on 18 April 1872 in Vienna, which was then a part of the Austro-Hungarian Empire. His family was aristocratic and frequently moved throughout Europe. He attended school in Kraków, Lemberg (modern Lviv), and Vienna, studying Greek and the natural sciences. He enrolled at the University of Vienna as a student of medicine, but audited classes in a wide variety of subjects, including mathematics and Chinese. Following an emergency appendectomy in 1895, von Zach moved to Leiden to recuperate. While in Leiden, von Zach attended the Dutch sinologist Gustaaf Schlegel's Chinese classes and began studying Manchu and Tibetan.

== Career ==
After publishing two articles on Manchu grammar, von Zach chose to pursue a career as a diplomat rather than as a scholar. He served in the Austro-Hungarian consulate in Beijing from 1901 to 1907, using his spare time to compile four volumes of his critiques of previous Chinese scholarship by Western scholars of his and previous generations, which he entitled Lexicographische Beiträge ("Lexicographical Contributions"). In 1909, he submitted and defended the work as a doctoral dissertation at the University of Vienna, and was awarded a PhD. He served as a diplomatic leader in Hong Kong, Yokohama, and then Singapore.

In 1919, following Austria-Hungary's dissolution after its defeat in World War I, von Zach's diplomatic post ceased to exist, leaving him with only a small pension. He then became a diplomat for the Dutch government in Indonesia – then part of the Netherlands East Indies – and served until 1925. In addition to authoring articles on topics of Chinese literature and translation, von Zach also spent years working on German translations of the Wen Xuan and the poems of Du Fu and Li Bai.

== Death and legacy ==
In 1942, near the height of World War II, the 69-year-old von Zach and a large number of Germans were put onto a Dutch ship for transport to Sri Lanka. On the 19th of January, the ship was attacked and sunk by a Japanese torpedo bomber 100 kilometres (62 mi) off the western coast of Sumatra. The Dutch crew escaped with all but one lifeboat, into which 53 of the 477 German passengers were loaded. The rest, including von Zach, drowned in the sea.

Von Zach is remembered as a brilliant scholar who possessed "an astounding knowledge of Chinese", but whose legacy was deeply marred by his "irascible personality and a penchant for acerbic criticism of other Sinologists' work", which alienated him from his peers and prevented him from publishing his work in the major journals of Chinese and Asian scholarship. By the early 1930s, Paul Pelliot felt von Zach's rude and demeaning writings had become unbearable, and banned him from ever publishing articles in T'oung Pao. Von Zach's publications often consisted of what he called verbesserung ("improvement") articles, in which he would thoroughly identify and criticize errors in other scholars' work. He was often known to rail against the competing opinions of others without producing evidence for his position, simply stating that he was right and others were wrong. Although his arrogance and contentious nature alienated him from his colleagues throughout his life, von Zach's talent and insights ensured that much of his work was published and appreciated for its quality.

== Sources ==
- Fogel, Joshua A. De l'un au multiple: Traductions du chinois vers les langues européenes (book review). The Journal of Asian Studies, ISSN 0021-9118, 02/2001, Volume 60, Issue 1, pp. 159 – 161. Available from JStor.
- Honey, David B. (2001). Incense at the Altar: Pioneering Sinologists and the Development of Classical Chinese Philology. American Oriental Series 86. New Haven, Connecticut: American Oriental Society. ISBN 0-940490-16-1.
- Knechtges, David R. (1982). Wen xuan or Selections of Refined Literature, Volume 1: Rhapsodies on Metropolises and Capitals. Princeton: Princeton University Press. ISBN 0691053464.

== Representative major works ==
- —— (1902). Lexicographische Beiträge. I. Peking. Münchener Digitalisierungszentrum
- —— (1904). Lexicographische Beiträge. II. Peking. Münchener Digitalisierungszentrum
- —— (1905). Lexicographische Beiträge Iii. Münchener Digitalisierungszentrum
- —— (1906). Lexicographische Beiträge Iv. Münchener Digitalisierungszentrum
- Han, Yu; translated by Erwin von Zach (1952). Poetische Werke. Cambridge: Harvard University Press.
- Tu, Fu; translated into German by Erwin von Zach, translated from the German by James Robert Hightower (1952). Tu Fu's Gedichte. Ubersetzt Von Erwin Von Zach ... Edited with an Introduction by James Robert Hightower. Ger. Vol. 2. Cambridge, Mass.: Harvard University Press. p. 864.
- Fang, translated by Ilse Martin, James Robert Hightower (1958). Die Chinesische Anthologie: Ubers. Aus Dem Wen Hsüan V. Cambridge, Mass.
- Li, Bai; translated by Erwin von Zach, Hartmut Bieg Lutz Walravens (2000). Gesammelte Gedichte. Wiesbaden: Harrassowitz. ISBN 3447042796.

Diplomatic posts
Preceded by Carl Bernauer	Austro-Hungarian Consul in Tianjin; 1908	Succeeded by Miloš Kobr
