= Cao Xian (disambiguation) =

Cao County (pinyin: Cáo Xiàn) is a county in Heze City, Shandong Province, China.

Cao Xian may also refer to:

- Cao Xian (scholar) (541–645), scholar of the Chen dynasty, the Sui dynasty, and the Tang dynasty
- Cao Xian (Cao Wei), Chinese noble woman of the aristocrat Cao family during the Three Kingdoms period
