= Liu Zewen =

Chinese painter

- 刘泽文
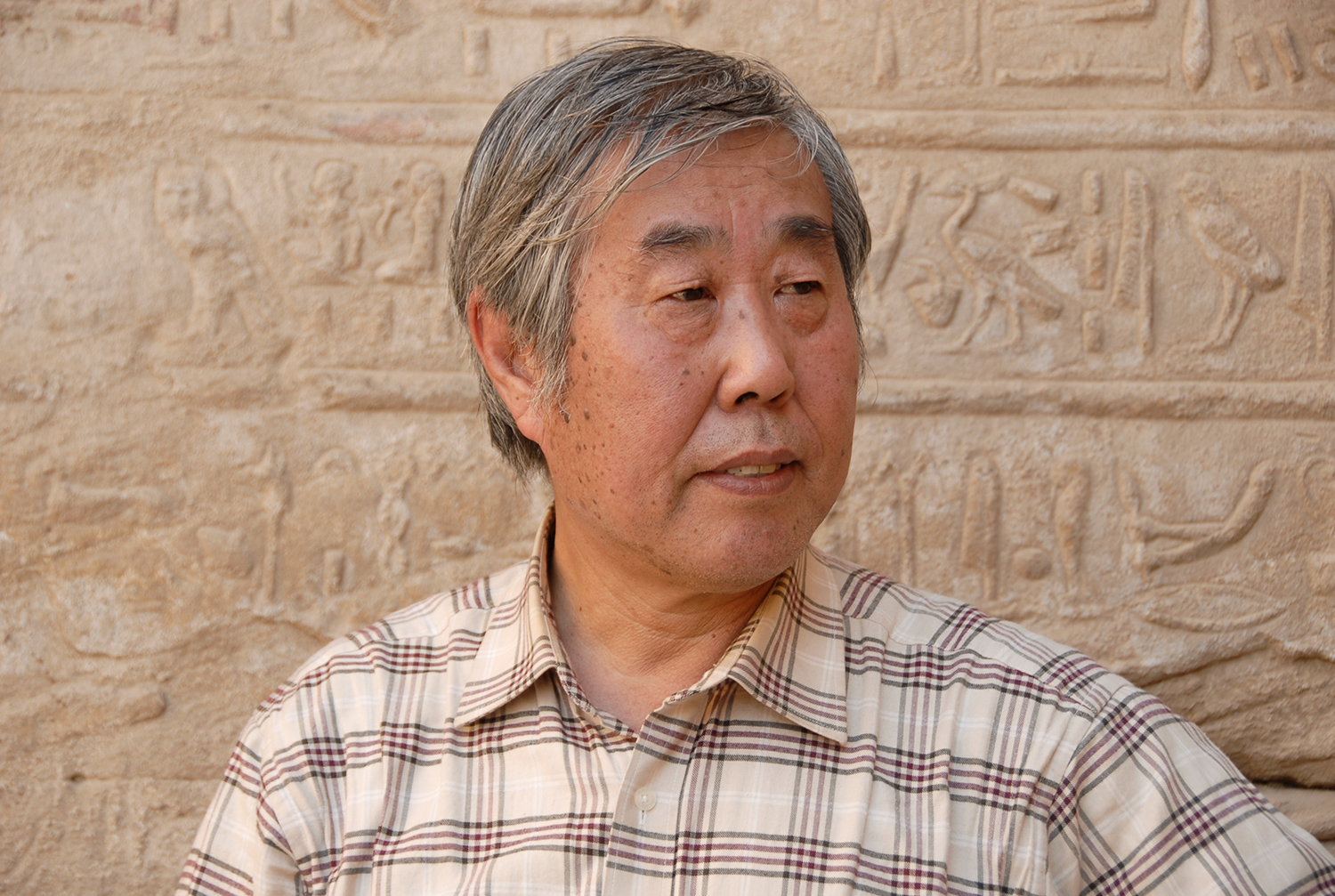
- Liu Zewen in February 2008
- Born: 1943 (age 82–83); Shandong Qingdao
- Occupation: Artist
- Years active: 1966 - Present
- Agent: Yantai Modern Art Academy
- Known for: Painting
- Style: Ink wash painting Gouache; Lianhuanhua; New Year picture
- Title: Member of China Artists Association; The President of Yantai Modern Art Academy
- Awards: 1952–1979 Shandong Excellent New Year picture Award; 1989 First Prize of Shandong Art Exhibition; Bronze Award of 1998 World Chinese Painting and Calligraphy Exhibition; Second prize of Shandong Province Art Exhibition celebrating the 50th anniversary of the founding of the People's Republic of China
- Website: "Yantai Modern Art Academy – Liu Zewen".

Liu Zewen (Simplified Chinese: 刘泽文, Traditional Chinese: 劉澤文, Pinyin: Liú Zéwén), was born in Qingdao, Shandong in 1943. He is a full-time painter of the Yantai Art Academy, national first-class artist and art professor, member of the Chinese Artists Association, visiting professor of the Academy of Fine Arts of Shandong University of Arts, professor of the Shandong Vocational College of Art & Design, consultant of the Shandong Artists Association, consultant of the Chinese Painting Figure Art Committee, committee member of the Shandong Painting Academy, member of the Shandong Chinese Painting Society, Vice President of the Shandong Mural Art Research Institute, honorary chairman of the Yantai Artists Association, and President of the Yantai Modern Art Academy.

Over the past 50 years, he has created thousands of works, which have been exhibited in Shandong provincial, China national and international art exhibitions. Among them, "Looking Beyond the Blue Sea and Thousands of Layers of Waves"《望穿碧海千层浪》, "Stories of Chen Yi's Guerrilla"《陈毅打游击的故事》 and "I Help Grandma with Her Needlework"《我帮奶奶引针线》were selected into the 1975 Chinese National Annual Art Exhibition, 1982 National Youth Art Exhibition and the seventh National Art Exhibition respectively.

He created lianhuanhua books "Break the Blockade line"《冲破封锁线》, Jiaodong red memory lianhuanhua book set – "Party Member Registration Form"《党员登记表》, "War fire of the Temple of thunder"《烽火雷神庙》, "Thousands gold to Yan 'an"《万两黄金送延安》, "Xihai Underground hospital"《西海地下医院》, "Legendary hero from the water"《传奇英雄于得水》and another over 60 books.

He also painted more than hundreds of propaganda paintings, New Year pictures "The Great Unity of All Ethnic Groups in China"《各民族大团结》, "Celebrating the publication of the Fifth Volume of Chairman Mao's Works" 《庆祝毛主席著作第五卷出版》and "The Renewal of Everything"《万象更新》.

== Career ==
In 2016, he won the award of Excellence in the creation category of the National lianhuanhua competition for his lianhuanhua book, The Sacred Signs of Lao-Tzu《老子圣迹图》.

In 1998, his Chinese painting "Examination Room" was selected into the "World Chinese Painting and Calligraphy Exhibition" hosted by the Ministry of Culture of the People's Republic of China and the Chinese Artists Association and won the Bronze Prize.

In 1989, his watercolour painting "I Help Grandma with Her Needlework"《我帮奶奶引针线》selected for the seventh Chinese National Art Exhibition.

In 1982, his gouache paintings "The Story of Chen Yi's Guerilla"《陈毅打游击的故事》were selected for the Chinese National Youth Art Exhibition.

In 1975, his gouache painting "Looking beyond the Blue Sea and Thousands of Layers of Waves"《望穿碧海千层浪》was selected into Chinese National Art exhibition and collected by the National Art Museum of China.

== Style, works and fame ==
"Victory friendship"《胜利友谊》, Weixian liberation monument. Sculpture designer Liu Zewen, placed in the Square of Weixian Internment Camp.

Liu's works of art take a wide range of forms, and he is skilled in various forms of art interpretation, from calligraphy and painting to large-scale sculpture design. His works were exhibited in numerous publications and gallery museum. He has also held exhibitions of his works in different Chinese and international cities.

In January 2017, "The Ox Turns the Universe – Liu Zewen's Ink Wash Painting Art Exhibition" was held in Jinan Shengshi Art Museum.

In September 2016, "The Symphony of Threads and Shapes – Drawing Works Exhibition of Liu Zewen" was held in The Art Museum of Shandong University of Arts.

In April 2016, he went to the World Daily Art Museum in New York City to hold the "Art Walker – Chinese Artists' Works Exhibition".

In May 2015, he went to the United Nations Office at Vienna to hold "Confucius' Home Trip – Chinese Artists' Works Exhibition".

In 2002, he and Yang Songlin, Konvik and Yu Feng went to Austria, Germany, France and other countries to hold "Oriental Charm – Traveling Exhibition of Chinese Paintings in Europe and America".

In September 2001, the "Liu Zewen Drawing Exhibition" was held in Beijing National Art Museum of China.

In May 1998, he was invited to Vienna to hold the exhibition of "Liu Zewen's Plasticism of East and West Asian Art".
