= J. Dudley Woodberry =

American theologian

Dr. J Dudley Woodberry (born 1934) is dean emeritus and senior professor of Intercultural Studies at Fuller Theological Seminary School of Intercultural Studies, specializing in Islamic Studies. While most of Woodberry's time has been spent teaching and writing for scholarly publications, he has also served for many years in Pakistan, Saudi Arabia, and Afghanistan (amongst other Muslim-majority countries). Woodberry has acted as editor for (from most recent to oldest): Paradigm Shifts in Christian Witness: Insights from Anthropology, Communication, and Spiritual Power (2008); Resources for Peacemaking in Muslim-Christian Relations: Contributions from the Conflict Transformation Project (2006); Muslim and Christian Reflections On Peace: Divine and Human Dimensions (2005); Reaching the Resistant: Barriers and Bridges for Mission (1998); Missiological Education for the Twenty-First Century: The Book, the Circle, and the Sandals (1996); and Muslims and Christians on the Emmaus Road: Crucial Issues in Witness Among Muslims (1991)

Woodberry's primary contribution to the field of Islamic-Christian relations has been in the area of "respectful understanding and witness among Muslims," theological comparative works, as well as numerous reflections and articles concerning relevant topics in the world of Muslim-Christian relations. Woodberry also emphasizes a holistic approach to intercultural outreach that is theologically grounded, learned in behavioural sciences, and is not ignorant of the history of Muslim-Christian encounter.

== Background ==
Woodberry was born to American parents engaged in Christian ministry in the Chinese province of Shandong in 1934. He became a Christian "in a childlike way" at the age of three while his family was on furlough back in the States. Upon returning to China, Woodberry recalls surviving an incident where he fell into the freezing Yantai harbour and barely survived the subsequent pneumonia. This incident (in Woodberry's own words), "led to a sense that I had been saved for a purpose". Woodberry would later be sent to the China Inland Mission School in Chefoo where, due to the outbreak of World War II, he would be detained as a prisoner of war by the Japanese. Eventually Woodberry (and his brothers and sisters) were exchanged for Japanese civilians in America and, after a year of separation from his parents, he was reunited with them.

== Life in America ==
Woodberry began his life in America in Upstate New York after a brief stint at Cornell University where his parents studied agriculture. When his Father then decided to move back to China, Woodberry followed his mother and one sister to Nyack, NY where she taught missions at the Missionary Training Institute (now Nyack College). At the age of 13, Woodberry went to boarding school at The Stony Brook School in Stony Brook, Long Island.

Eventually choosing to attend Union College in Schenectady, New York, (where he obtained a Bachelor of Arts) Woodberry soon found himself growing restless and soon embarked on a ministry tour of Latin America – eager to become involved in intercultural outreach. It was at a stopover in Havana, Cuba, where Woodberry sensed he should enter seminary teaching "as a means of equipping indigenous Christians for ministry". His calling to specifically focus on outreach to Muslims was confirmed on a trip to Lebanon where he observed the Palestinian refugee camps and began to "sense some of the issues of peace and justice that must be part of a holistic Gospel".

== Fuller Theological Seminary and American University of Beirut ==
After time spent traveling, Woodberry enrolled at Fuller Theological Seminary where he would create the International Studies Program, and eventually arrive at the American University of Beirut where he would begin his formal training in Islamic Studies under Arab Christian scholars and other notable personalities such as St John Philby. It was here in Beirut that Woodberry would eventually find his future wife, Roberta Smith, who was studying at the Beirut College for Women. Woodberry received a Masters of Divinity from Fuller, and an MA from the American University of Beirut. While in the Middle East, he also had the opportunity to study with scholars of Islam and Christian-Muslim relations such as Kenneth Cragg and Daud Rahbar.

== Harvard Years ==
Smith and Woodberry married and moved to Cambridge, Massachusetts, where their first two sons (John and Bob) were born, while Woodberry continued his education at Harvard University. It was here in Massachusetts that Woodberry began his ministry to international students, as a staff member at Park Street Church where Harold Ockenga served as pastor. At Harvard, Woodberry studied under leading scholars in the field of Islamic studies including Sir Hamilton Gibb, George Makdisi, Wilfred Cantwell Smith, Seyyed Hossein Nasr, and Annemarie Schimmel. His field of study, Islamic Fundamentalism, was seen as a topic of little value at that time. Woodberry would graduate from Harvard in 1968, having completed his Ph.D. in Islamic Studies and writing his dissertation on "Hassan al-Banna's Articles of Belief."

== Pakistan, Afghanistan, and Saudi Arabia ==
After the Harvard years, Woodberry and his family moved to Pakistan with the support of the Presbyterian Program Agency of the United Presbyterian Church in the U.S.A. It was here that their third and final son, David, was born. During a time of ministry in Kabul, Afghanistan, Woodberry acted as an advocate for two Pakistani missionaries who had been incarcerated for handing out the Gospel of Luke. Due to Woodberry's knowledge of the Qur'an, he was able to develop an argument that would be accepted by the Muslim authorities and subsequently secured the release of the missionaries. It was due to this incident with the law that Woodberry began to further develop his thoughts regarding Christian ethics, specifically the limitations of government imposed law when it contradicts Christian commandments. From here, Woodberry continued to Saudi Arabia where he pastored a substantial church before being shut down by the government. Again, Woodberry used Muslim writings, a letter from the Islamic prophet, Muhammad about the Christians of Najran that allowed priests or pastors to continue in ministry as long as they paid the jizya, to eventually see the house churches re-opened. Eventually, with his family in mind, Woodberry returned to America to teach at Reformed Bible College (now Kuyper College) in Grand Rapids.

== Zwemer Institute and further time at Fuller ==
From Grand Rapids, Woodberry moved to California, where he accepted a joint teaching position with the Zwemer Institute (now known as the Zwemer Center) and Fuller Theological Seminary. After some years of teaching, and initial reluctance, Woodberry accepted the deanship of Fuller's School of Intercultural Studies. Woodberry emphasizes a core curriculum containing "Word [theology of mission], World [behavioural sciences like anthropology], and Church [lessons from mission history and church growth]".

== The Woodberry Intercultural Institute ==
In the early 2020's a group of Woodberry's former graduate students and other Evangelical scholars influenced by Woodberry began work on forming a "Woodberry Institute" dedicated to "carrying forward the legacy of J. Dudley Woodberry in promoting the kind of respectful mutual understanding and rigorous scholarship that advances peace between Muslims and Christians and equips Christians to be faithful witnesses to the love of Jesus Christ in their relationships with Muslim friends and partners." This group of scholars decided to rename and repurpose a Christian NGO led by two members of the group as the Woodberry Intercultural Institute." Dudley Woodberry's son Robert Dudley Woodberry serves on the Board of this Woodberry Institute.
