= Ted McLaren =

Scotland international rugby union player

- Born: Edward McLaren; 28 May 1902 Edinburgh, Scotland
- Died: 30 March 1950 (aged 47) Chalfont St Peter, England

Rugby union career
- Position: Centre
Amateur team(s)
Years	Team	Apps	(Points)
- Royal HSFP
- London Scottish
- Shanghai
Provincial / State sides
Years	Team	Apps	(Points)
1922	Edinburgh District		
1923	Scotland Probables		
1924	Scotland Possibles		
International career
Years	Team	Apps	(Points)
1923-24	Scotland	5	(9)

Ted McLaren (28 May 1902 – 30 March 1950) was a Scotland international rugby union player.

== Rugby Union career ==
=== Amateur career ===
McLaren was brought up in Edinburgh and went to the Royal High School. He later played rugby union for Royal HSFP.

On moving to London for business he then played rugby union for London Scottish.

He later played rugby for the Shanghai Rugby Club in China.

=== Provincial career ===
While with Royal HSFP he played for Edinburgh District in the inter-city match of 1922.

While with London Scottish he played for Scotland Probables in the first trial match of 1923. He then played for the Scotland Possibles in the subsequent trial match, a month later, in 1924.

=== International career ===
He was capped 5 times for Scotland from 1923 to 1924.

=== Administrative career ===
He was made a vice-president of the Shanghai club in 1938. He was made President shortly after the war ended. He moved to England in 1949 after the communists took control in China.

The last recorded game of Shanghai rugby club in the 1950s (before the club was re-started in the 1990s) was on 18 March 1950 (a match between the players and former players), although the club drifted on till 1952 in the new communist China. Taken ill a week before that match with a coronary thrombosis, McLaren died around two weeks after that last match in March 1950. Shorn of McLaren's Scottish influence, the closing funds of the club in 1952 went instead to Twickenham in England to furnish the President's Room there.

=== Referee career ===
He became a rugby union referee in China when his playing days were over.

== Business career ==
McLaren worked with the shipping firm Butterfield & Swire. He learned Chinese; and managed to work in various Chinese cities:- Hankow, Shanghai, Tientsin and Hong Kong. He was praised by his company for his sensitive handling of the Wanhsien incident on the Upper Yangtze in 1926 when two boats were seized by the local warlord Yang Sen.

== Friendship with Eric Liddell ==
McLaren was great friends with fellow Scotland international Eric Liddell. Aside from playing in the same Scotland side and being friends in Edinburgh, both moved to Tientsin - Liddell as a missionary and McLaren with business working for Butterfield and Swire - and remained friends in China. Both remained in China as the Second World War started; and both were interred in the Tientsen camp by Japan, before both were sent to the same Japanese Civilian Internment camp in Weihsien, China.

Liddell did not survive the Weihsen camp and died in 1944. It was McLaren that delivered Liddell's eulogy in camp.

We played [Rugby] in the same side and against one another for... three years and never once did he show the slightest sign of bad temper or bad sportsmanship... both... were utterly foreign to him. Many a time he was lain for by his opponents, whose tactics were at least doubtful, but never would he repay them with their own coin - his method was invariable. He merely played better rugby and made them look as second raters. [He had] that characteristic of never to give in ― he was never beaten but always trying... no truer sportsman ever drew on a running shoe...

== Weihsen Internment Camp ==
McLaren became the Chairman of Discipline Committee for the Weihsien Civilian Assembly Center, a prison camp which held 1,500 civilian internees, mostly British and Americans, of the Japanese. His job essentially was the go-between between the internees and the Camp Commander. He protected the internees as much as possible; and even managed to lambast the Japanese officers on occasion. He managed to secure two internees escape; waited until they could not be caught; and then reported the escape to the Japanese Commandant, Mr. Izu. This action successfully ensured no reprisals by the Japanese on the inmates.

Most inmates survived on very meagre rations. That the majority survived is testament to McLaren's skill of diplomacy and organisation; and when the camp was liberated by the Americans they were astounded to find it well-run. The Commandment Mr. Izu was charged with war crimes - but it was McLaren that testified on his behalf, as he believed Izu had done his best for the camp under the Japanese regime; and so Izu was acquitted.
