= Paul Thompson (sinologist) =

Paul Mulligan Thompson
- Born: February 10, 1931; Xingtai, Hebei, China
- Died: June 12, 2007 (aged 76); London, England
- Citizenship: UK
- Known for: Reconstruction of the text of the Book of Shenzi
- Scientific career
- Fields: Linguistics
- Workplaces: School of Oriental and African Studies
- Doctoral advisor: Hellmut Wilhelm

Paul Mulligan Thompson (10 February 1931 – 12 June 2007) was a British sinologist and pioneer in the field of Chinese computer applications.

== Biography ==
Paul Thompson was born at Xingtai in Hebei province, China, where his Northern Irish parents worked as missionaries with the China Inland Mission. He attended the Chefoo School, a Christian boarding school at Yantai in Shandong province, until November 1942 when the staff and students were interned at the Temple Hill Japanese Internment Camp. A few months later, in the summer of 1943, Thompson and his family were moved to the Weixian Internment Camp in Shandong (modern Weifang city), where they remained until liberated by American paratroopers in 1945. His family then moved back to Northern Ireland, and Thompson completed his schooling in Belfast.

After leaving school he travelled widely, and studied at the Free University of Amsterdam, the University of Minnesota at Minneapolis (where he married his wife, Marcia Cole, in 1952), and the U.S. Army Language School at Monterey, California, but he did not obtain a degree from any of these institutions. He also worked for several years as an interpreter in Japan and a teacher in Taiwan. In 1959 he was accepted into the University of Washington at Seattle, where he obtained a BA in 1960, and studied for his PhD on the lost book of Shenzi under Hellmut Wilhelm.

After receiving his PhD he taught at the University of Wisconsin from 1963 to 1970, and then in 1970 he was appointed to a position at the School of Oriental and African Studies (SOAS) in London, where he remained until his retirement in 1996. He was a key figure, together with D. C. Lau, Angus Graham and Sarah Allan, in making SOAS a world-renowned centre for the teaching of Chinese philosophy during the 1970s and 1980s.

Thompson's major academic achievement was The Shen Tzu Fragments (1979), a work of textual scholarship in which he constructed a critical edition of the lost book of Shen Dao (probably originally composed during the early 3rd century BC) from the hundreds of quotations from it that are preserved in other Chinese texts. The methodology that he devised for analyzing the Shenzi fragments was based on the methods originally developed in Classical and Biblical scholarship, and was the first time that such methods had been applied to a classical Chinese text.

In addition to his work on early Chinese philosophy, Thompson was interested in the use of computers for sinological research, and in the early 1980s developed a Chinese text input system that used dynamic tables of statistical frequency to generate a list of candidate characters, thus laying the groundwork for the development of the most common Chinese language input systems in use today.

He died of cancer in 2007.

After his death, Thompson's family presented his library to the Centre for Excavated Texts and Ancient Literature, Fudan University, Shanghai. In 2009 a conference was held in his memory at Fudan University, and the proceedings of the conference were published in 2010 as 出土文献与传世典籍的诠释—纪念谭朴森先生逝世两周年国际学术研讨会论文集 (Excavated texts and transmitted literature: a festschrift for Paul Thompson) by Shanghai guji chubanshe (ISBN 7532556662 / 9787532556663).

Thompson's widow, Marcia Thompson (1927-2023), was an educator. Following her work at North Harringay Primary School, London, she wrote several children's books, one of which, Akbar's India. Growing up and becoming a great emperor, was published in 2019.

== Works ==
- 1979. The Shen Tzu Fragments. Oxford and London.
