= Change: Eight Lectures on the 'I Ching' =

- Author: Hellmut Wilhelm
- Original title: Die Wandlung: Acht Vorlesungen zum I-Ging
- Translator: Cary Baynes
- Publisher: Routledge & Kegan Paul
- Publication date: 1961
- Publication place: London
- ISBN: 0 7100 6661 9

Change: Eight Lectures on the 'I Ching' is a collection of lectures about the I Ching delivered by Hellmut Wilhelm in Beijing in 1943. These lectures were delivered during the Japanese occupation of China. These lectures were delivered in German to a small group gathered around Wilhelm Haas.

The lectures were first published as Die Wandlung: Acht Vorlesungen zum I-Ging (Peking, 1945). The English translation was made by Cary Baynes and was first published in 1961. He acknowledged the support of both Wilhelm and his own daughter, Ximena de Angulo, in the Translator's Note. p.vi

== Preface ==
Hellmut Wilhelm described in which the lectures were first delivered in his "Preface" to the English translation written in Seattle, Spring 1958:

"This was the grim time when the war in China had been going on for almost six years and Peking was under Japanese occupation, a time when all creative forces seemed frozen and darkness ruled the day. During that period there was a group of German-speaking people in the city who kept apart from the activities of the German community and everything connected with it. This group found a center in the home of Wilhelm Haas. Wilhelm Haas is a man with the courage of perseverance; even in the most hopeless situations he has never yielded to despair. And thus it was not by chance that one day he suggested to me that I give some lectures at his house on the Book of Changes.", p.vii

Wilhelm complained that the political climate of the time add encouraged some of the participants to dabble in the occult. This was a tendency that he did not want to encourage.

== 1 Origins ==
(pp. 3–12)
"Our object is to spend some hours together discussing the Book of Changes. Of course, such an undertaking is not without hazards. This book is difficult to understand; it is so full of cryptic sayings and seemingly abstruse matters that an explanation is often not readily available, and we are tempted to fall back on interpretation to get at the meaning. To us children of an essentially rational generation it poses a problem we are at first reluctant to face; we are led into a region in which we do not know the terrain, and which we have forbidden ourselves to enter except possibly in rare moments of imaginative daring." (p. 3)

=== The naming of particular Hexagrams ===
Wilhelm describes how situations are characterised by symbols and the names they have been given. These names include: (p. 4)

- The Corners of the Mouth,
- Youthful Folly,
- Molting,
- Biting Through,
- Possession,
- Return (The Turning Point),
- The Obstacle,
- Oppression,
- Standstill,
- Waiting,
- Decrease,
- Retreat,
- Break-Through,
- Pushing Upward,
- Development,
- Increase,
- Abundance,
- After Completion,
- Before Completion,

The next group of situations are taken from social life: (p. 4)

- The Marrying Maiden,
- The Clan,
- The Well,
- Fellowship with Men,
- Holding Together,
- Approach,
- Wooing,
- Coming to Meet,
- Following,
- The Power of the Great,
- Peace,
- Opposition,
- Conflict,

Individual character traits are identified: (p. 5)

- Modesty,
- Grace,
- Innocence,
- Enthusiasm,
- Inner Truth,

There are also images of suprapersonal significance: (p. 5)

- The Clinging,
- The Arousing,
- Holding Still,
- The Gentle,
- The Joyous,
- The Creative
- The Receptive

Other hexagrams are discussed:

- Darkening of the Light,
- Preponderance of the Great,
- Keeping Still,

=== The emergence of the eight trigrams ===
King Wen is credited with the composition of the I Ching through assembling the eight trigrams in the sixty-four permutations constitute hexagrams of the I Ching. He is also credited with having written the judgments which are appended to each hexagram. The most commonly used sequence of the 64 hexagrams is attributed to him and is usually referred to as the King Wen sequence.

== 2 The Concept of Change ==
(pp. 13–22)
"If we turn now to the concept of change which has given the I Ching its name and which determines its system of thought, we are immediately reminded of the aphorism panta rhei, “everything flows,” used by Heraclitus of Ephesus around the year 500 b.c. as the foundation of his own philosophical system. This was about the time when the I Ching also took shape, and we have here one of those remarkable instances of parallelism when phases in the development of East and West simultaneously find expression in similar ways. Even this instance, however, so striking at first, discloses on closer examination the typical differences between the two worlds." (p.13)

== 3 The Two Fundamental Principles ==
(pp. 23-34)
"We have discussed the element of constancy or reliability in the principle of change and have noted the definition: “Change: that is the unchangeable.” Into the ceaseless change immediately evident to the senses this constancy introduces a principle of order guaranteeing duration in the ebb and flow of events. When man apprehends this principle, he has abandoned the condition of unreflective identification with nature; reflective consciousness enters upon the scene. To become aware of what is constant in the flux of nature and life is the first step in abstract thinking." (p.23)

== 4 The Trigrams and the Hexagrams ==
(pp. 35-47)
"We have tried to sketch the system on which the Book of Changes is based. We saw that the whole order underlying the world and life is imaged in two lines charged with spiritual meaning. These lines are an embodiment of the orbit of change and of the two poles that determine it. It is important to think of this representation as very concrete. Today we tend to speak of “symbols” in such a context, each person varying at will the distance between the symbol and the thing symbolized. In a magical world view, however, such as the one which has left its impress on the oldest strata of our book, a thing and its image are identical." (p.35)

== 5 The Hexagrams Ch’ien and K’un ==
(pp. 48-63)
"The system of the sixty-four hexagrams by which the extent and configuration of the changing world is plotted as if by landmarks is highly interesting from the outset, for the number and make-up of the individual hexagrams is fixed by mathematical law. Nothing can be added, nothing taken away. Scholars have in fact extended the mathematical order underlying the individual hexagram and, applying it to the system as a whole, have obtained a perfect numerical representation satisfying to the imagination of a mind trained in mathematics." (p. 48)

== 6 The Ten Wings ==
(pp. 64–78)
"We have reviewed the treasure of images in the trigrams and hexagrams of the Book of Changes, and have come to realize that these images and their designations belong to a very old stratum of culture and are in part even older than the time of the compilation of the book. Indeed, they belong to a phase of man’s being when myths and symbols still gave form to his intuitions and experiences; they reveal a world in which the language of the psyche and the sense of community expressed by it had not yet been suppressed by a logical individuation." (p. 64)

== 7 The Later History of the Book of Changes ==
(pp. 79–91)
"Our discussion of the system of the Book of Changes has brought out two aspects. We saw in it a method of divination, a way of access to the deep-lying psychic strata of the individual and of the group, the gate to the underground foundations upon which, in the East, all being and action rests. To return to this gateway has always been the prescribed way of meeting the demands of the day; these demands are not to be met with the reactions of the moment, but with a standpoint that is steadfast and timeless. We have seen the method as an early and lucid work of the human mind, consistent, logical, and cogent." (p. 79)

== 8 The Oracle Book ==
(pp. 92–104)
"We have often had occasion to remark that the Book of Changes is originally an oracle book, that is, a system of ideas and precepts from which a person needing information could, upon putting a precisely worded question, obtain the desired answer and guidance. I have endeavored to explain how this system was constituted, in what times and ideas it had its roots, and from what reservoir the answers were taken. I hope I have succeeded in showing not only that this system is so comprehensive that not only is nothing human alien to it, but also that it embraces both the patterns one earth and the images in the heavens." (p. 92)
