= Hellmut Wilhelm =

German Sinologist

- Born: 10 December 1905; Qingdao, Kiautschou Bay concession, German Empire
- Died: 5 June 1990 (aged 84); Seattle, Washington, United States
- Education: University of Berlin
- Known for: Yijing (I Ching) studies
- Scientific career
- Fields: Chinese history, literature
- Workplaces: University of Washington; Peking University
- Notable students: David R. Knechtges

Chinese name
- Traditional Chinese: 衛德明
- Simplified Chinese: 卫德明
Transcriptions
Standard Mandarin
- Hanyu Pinyin: Wèi Démíng
- Gwoyeu Romatzyh: Wey Derming
- Wade–Giles: Wei Te-ming

Hellmut Wilhelm (10 December 1905 – 5 July 1990) was a German Sinologist known for his studies of both Chinese literature and Chinese history. Wilhelm was an expert on the ancient Chinese divination text I Ching (Yi jing), which he believed to represent the essence of Chinese thought. He also produced one of the most widely used German-Chinese dictionaries of the 20th century. He held teaching positions at Peking University and the University of Washington.

Wilhelm's father, Richard Wilhelm, was also a noted Sinologist, and held the first chair of Sinology at the University of Frankfurt.

== Biography ==
Hellmut Wilhelm was born on 10 December 1905 in the Chinese city of Qingdao, which was then a German enclave due to the Kiautschou Bay concession of 1891. Wilhelm was the third son of the German missionary and sinologist Richard Wilhelm. His early education in China coincided with the Xinhai Revolution, when the Qing dynasty was overthrown and China moved toward republican government, and he was intimately familiar with the Chinese intellectual world of that era. When Qingdao was occupied by the Japanese Army, Japan having declared war on Germany in 1914 at the beginning of World War I, Wilhelm's parents sent him to live with friends in Shanghai for his safety.

Following the war's conclusion, Wilhelm's family returned to Germany, where his father became the first chair of Sinology at the University of Frankfurt. Wilhelm first attended a preparatory school in Stuttgart, then began studying at the University of Frankfurt, where he also served as his father's assistant. He later attended Kiel University and the University of Grenoble, studying law and political science. He passed the German Staatsexamen ("State Examination") in law in 1928. After his father's death in 1930, Wilhelm decided to continue his father's work in ancient Chinese literature and pursue a career in Chinese scholarship.

Wilhelm pursued graduate study in Chinese at the University of Berlin. He wrote a dissertation on Ming dynasty scholar Gu Yanwu, receiving a doctorate in 1932. Wilhelm then returned to China, where he lived and worked in Beijing until 1948. He taught German language and literature at Peking University and produced the Deutsch-Chinesische Wörterbuch, a well-known German-Chinese dictionary. During the early 1940s, Wilhelm would frequently give lectures on Chinese history and thought to the German-speaking community in Beijing. In 1944, Wilhelm published a set of lectures on the ancient Chinese classic Yi Jing entitled Die Wandlung: Acht Vorträge zum I-Ging – subsequently translated into English as Change: Eight Lectures on the 'I Ching' – which have become the most widely read introduction to the Yi Jing in a Western language.

In 1948, Wilhelm moved to the United States to take up a position as a professor of Chinese at the University of Washington, where he taught until he was forced to retire in 1971 due to eye problems that affected his vision and reading abilities. He authored dozens of articles and manuscripts, and was a key figure in establishing the Far Eastern and Russian Institute. A collection that includes documents relating to his life, photographs, and manuscripts of his scientific work on Gu Yanwu and the Yi Jing can be found in the German Exiles Archive of the German National Library.

== Students ==
- Paul Thompson (1931 – 2007) – PhD dissertation on Shen Dao.
- David R. Knechtges (born 1942) – translator of Wenxuan, professor at University of Washington

== Selected works ==
- (in German) Chinas Geschichte: Zehn einführende Vorträge ["China's History: Ten Introductory Lectures"] (Chung-kuo li-shih shu-yao 中國歷史術要). Peking: Vetch, 1944.
- (in German) Die Wandlung: Acht Vorträge zum I-ging ["Change: Eight Lectures on the I-Ching"] (Chou-i shu-yao 周易術要). Peking: Vetch, 1944.
- (in German) Gesellschaft und Staat in China: Acht Vorträge ["Society and State in China: Eight Lectures"] (Shih-ch'ün yüan-kuo 史群元國). Peking: Vetch, 1944.
- (in German) Deutsch-chinesisches Wörterbuch ["German-Chinese Dictionary"]. Shanghai: Nössler, 1945.
- Change: Eight Lectures on the I-Ching. Translated by Cary F. Baynes. Bollingen Series, 62. New York: Pantheon Books, 1960.
- Heaven, Earth, and Man in the Book of Changes: Seven Eranos Lectures. Seattle, London: University of Washington Press, 1977.
