= Wenxuan zhu =

Annotations to the Wenxuan collection of poetry and essays

Wenxuan zhu (simplified Chinese: 文选注; traditional Chinese: 文選注; pinyin: Wénxuǎn zhù; Wade–Giles: Wen-hsüan chu) is a Tang dynasty commentary on the Wenxuan (Chinese: 文选; pinyin: Wénxuǎn; Wade–Giles: Wen-hsüan, Selections of Refined Literature). The commentary is authored by the scholar Li Shan (李善, 630–689). It is the oldest surviving and most influential commentary on this classical Chinese anthology. The Wenxuan itself is the earliest extant Chinese anthology arranged by genre.

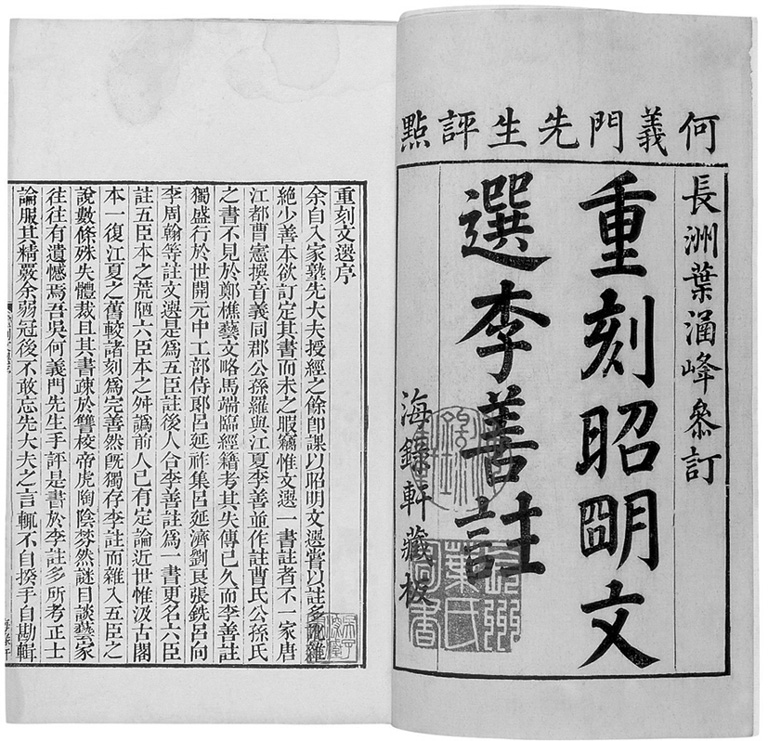
Edition of the Zhaoming Wenxuan 昭明文選 with the Commentary by Li Shan, edited by He Zhuo (何焯, 1661–1722)

Liuchen zhu Wenxuan 六臣注文選

== Overview ==
Li Shan was a Tang dynasty scholar and commentator, renowned for his comprehensive annotations on the Wenxuan, the literary anthology originally compiled by Xiao Tong (萧统) of the Liang dynasty (Southern dynasties). The commentary to the Wenxuan draws on nearly 1,700 classical works and focuses on etymology, literary allusions, and textual criticism. The commentary significantly facilitated the use of classical references in Tang poetry and literature.

The Wenxuan zhu is generally considered a critical commentary rather than a purely explanatory one. Li Shan incorporated and quoted numerous earlier commentaries on the works included in the Wenxuan, submitting his text to the imperial court in 658. His annotations are known for their rigor and detailed scholarship, providing both semantic explanations and textual emendations. Together with the commentaries Shuijing zhu (by Li Daoyuan), Pei Songzhi's Sanguozhi zhu, and Liu Xiaobiao's Shishuo Xinyu zhu, Li Shan’s work is regarded as one of the “Four Great Classical Commentaries” of China.

== Liuchen zhu Wenxuan ==
Another notable commentary (collection) is the Wuchen zhu Wenxuan (五臣注文選, “Comments of the Five Ministers on the Wenxuan”) from 718, a composite edition incorporating annotations by five Tang scholars: Lü Yanji (呂延濟), Liu Liang (劉良), Zhang Xian (張銑), Lü Xiang (呂向), and Li Zhouhan (李周翰). During the Song dynasty, Li Shan's commentary and the five other less prominent Tang-era commentaries were compiled together as the Liuchen zhu Wenxuan (六臣注文選, “Comments of the Six Masters on the Wenxuan”).

The Hanyu da zidian (HYDZD) f.e. uses besides the Hu Kejia 胡克家 Qing dynasty edition (1809; edition Zhonghua shuju 1977) also the Sibu congkan 四部丛刊 photographic reproduction of a Song dynasty print Liuchen zhu Wenxuan 六臣注文选 as its editions.

== Legacy ==
Li Shan's Wenxuan zhu has had a profound impact on Tang dynasty literature and subsequent Chinese literary scholarship. Its meticulous documentation of sources and allusions continues to serve as an important reference for scholars of classical Chinese literature.

The work is important for a better understanding of parts of the transmission history of early Chinese literature, as f.e. of the book Zhuangzi.

A widely used edition today is the 1986 critical edition published by Shanghai guji chubanshe.

Sun Zhizu 孫志祖 (1737-1801) wrote a Wenxuan Lizhu buzheng 文选李注补正 in the time of the Qing dynasty to supplement and correct the work.

== See also ==
- Li Shan – Tang dynasty scholar and author of the Wenxuan zhu (Chinese)

== Bibliography ==
- Wenxuan zhu 文选注. Shanghai guji chubanshe 上海古籍出版社 1986 (critical edition)
- Hanyu da zidian. 1993 (one-volume edition)
