= David R. Knechtges =

American sinologist (born 1942)

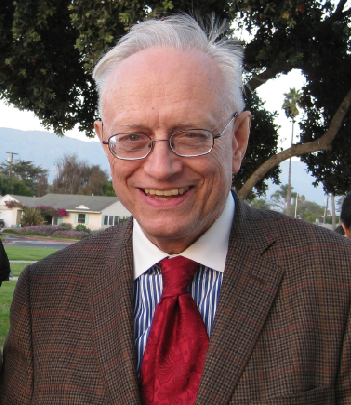
- Born: October 23, 1942 (age 83); Great Falls, Montana, U.S.
- Education: University of Washington (BA, PhD); Harvard University (MA)
- Scientific career
- Fields: Fu, Han dynasty and Six Dynasties literature
- Doctoral advisor: Hellmut Wilhelm
- Other academic advisors: James Robert Hightower; K. C. Hsiao; Li Fang-Kuei; Vincent Y.C. Shih
- Notable students: Stephen Owen

Chinese name
- Traditional Chinese: 康達維
- Simplified Chinese: 康达维
Transcriptions
Standard Mandarin
- Hanyu Pinyin: Kāng Dáwéi
- Gwoyeu Romatzyh: Kang Darwei
- Wade–Giles: K'ang Ta-wei

David Richard Knechtges (/kəˈnɛktəs/; born October 23, 1942) is an American sinologist and professor emeritus of Chinese literature at the University of Washington. An expert on Han dynasty and Six dynasties period literature, Knechtges' studies of Chinese fu poetry are largely responsible for the revival of Western academic interest in the subject, a major genre which had become largely neglected until the mid-20th century.

Knechtges is best known for his ongoing translation of the early Chinese literary anthology Selections of Refined Literature (Wen xuan), which is to be its first ever full translation into English.

== Life and career ==
David Knechtges was born on October 23, 1942, in Great Falls, Montana, and grew up in Kirkland, Washington. Knechtges attended Lake Washington High School, and originally intended to study biology or chemistry. However, while in high school he happened to attend a presentation given at his school by the German Sinologist Hellmut Wilhelm on two well-known China-related novels the students had been assigned to read: The Good Earth by Pearl Buck, and Rickshaw Boy by Lao She. He was fascinated and impressed by Wilhelm's knowledge and presentation, and soon decided to change his academic focus to Chinese history, language, and literature.

After graduating from high school in 1960, Knechtges matriculated at the University of Washington and majored in Chinese, graduating in 1964 with a B.A. magna cum laude. Having decided to pursue graduate study in Chinese, he first went to Harvard University, and received an A.M. in 1965. He then returned to the University of Washington for doctoral studies under Wilhelm, and received a Ph.D. in 1968 with a dissertation entitled "Yang Shyong, the Fuh, and Hann Rhetoric", a study of the fu rhapsodies of Han dynasty writer and scholar Yang Xiong. After receiving his Ph.D., Knechtges taught at Harvard and then Yale University for several years before joining Washington's Asian Languages and Literature faculty in 1972. He taught at Washington for 42 years before retiring in 2014.

Knechtges has written or edited a number of books on ancient Chinese literature, and is best known for his ongoing translation of the Wen xuan (Selections of Refined Literature), a major collection of early Chinese literature, which is to be the work's first ever full translation into English. His wife, Tai-ping Chang Knechtges, is an affiliate assistant professor at Washington, and often serves as Knechtges' co-editor. They have one daughter together.

Knechtges was inducted into the American Academy of Arts and Sciences in 2006. In 2014, the Chinese government awarded Knechtges the 8th China Book Award for his contributions to Chinese literary scholarship, especially his editing and translation of The Cambridge History of Chinese Civilisation.

== Selected works ==
- Knechtges, David R. (1968). "Yang Shyong, the Fuh, and Hann Rhetoric". Ph.D. dissertation (University of Washington).
- ——— (1976). The Han Rhapsody: A Study of the Fu of Yang Hsiung (53 BC – AD 18). Cambridge: Cambridge University Press.
- ——— (1982). Wen xuan or Selections of Refined Literature, Volume One: Rhapsodies on Metropolises and Capitals. Princeton: Princeton University Press.
- ——— (1982). The Han Shu Biography of Yang Xiong (53 BC – AD 18). Tempe: Center for Asian Studies, Arizona State University.
- ——— (1987). Wen xuan or Selections of Refined Literature, Volume Two: Rhapsodies on Sacrifices, Hunts, Travel, Palaces and Halls, Rivers and Seas. Princeton: Princeton University Press.
- ——— (1996). Wen xuan or Selections of Refined Literature, Volume Three: Rhapsodies on Natural Phenomena, Birds and Animals, Aspirations and Feelings, Sorrowful Laments, Literature, Music, and Passions. Princeton: Princeton University Press.
- ———, trans. Gong, Kechang 龔克昌 (1997). Studies on the Han Fu [Han fu yanjiu 漢賦研究]. American Oriental Series. Vol. 84. New Haven: American Oriental Society.
- ——— (2002). Court Culture and Literature in Early China. Variorum Collected Studies Series. Aldershot: Ashgate Publishing.
- ———; Kroll, Paul, eds. (2003). Studies in Early Medieval Chinese Literature and Cultural History: In Honor of Richard B. Mather and Donald Holzman. Provo, Utah: T'ang Studies Society.
- ———; Vance, Eugene, eds. (2005). Rhetoric and the Discourses of Power in Court Culture: China, Europe, and Japan. Seattle: University of Washington Press.
- ——— (2010). "From the Eastern Han through the Western Jin (AD 25 – 317)". In Owen, Stephen (ed.). The Cambridge History of Chinese Literature, Volume 1: To 1375. Cambridge: Cambridge University Press. pp. 116–98.
- ———, ed. (2012). The History of Chinese Civilisation, 4 vols. Cambridge: Cambridge University Press.
- ———; Chang, Taiping, eds. (2010–14). Ancient and Early Medieval Chinese Literature: A Reference Guide. 4 vols. Leiden: E.J. Brill.
