= Langdon Gilkey =

American theologian (1919–2004)

- Born: Langdon Brown Gilkey; February 9, 1919
- Died: November 19, 2004 (aged 85)

Academic background
- Education: Harvard University; Columbia University

Langdon Brown Gilkey (February 9, 1919 – November 19, 2004) was an American Protestant ecumenical theologian.

== Early life and education ==
A grandson of Clarence Talmadge Brown, the first Protestant minister to gather a congregation in Salt Lake City, Gilkey grew up in Hyde Park, Chicago. His father Charles Whitney Gilkey was a liberal theologian and the first Dean of the University of Chicago's Rockefeller Chapel; his mother was Geraldine Gunsaulus Brown who was a well known feminist and leader of the YWCA.

Gilkey attended elementary school at the University of Chicago Laboratory School, and in 1936 graduated from the Asheville School for Boys in North Carolina. In 1940, he earned a Bachelor of Arts in philosophy, magna cum laude, from Harvard University, where he lived in Grays Hall during his freshman year. The following year, he went to China to teach English at Yenching University and was subsequently (1943) imprisoned by the Japanese, first under house arrest at the university and later at Weixian Internment Camp near the city of Weifang in Shandong Province (where Eric Liddell was a fellow internee).

== Career ==
After the war, Gilkey obtained his doctorate in religion from Columbia University in New York, being both mentored by and a teaching assistant to Reinhold Niebuhr. He was a Fulbright scholar at Cambridge University (1950–51), and went on to become a professor at Vassar College from 1951 to 1954, and then at Vanderbilt Divinity School from 1954 to 1963. He received a Guggenheim Fellowship in 1960 to study in Munich; another Guggenheim in the mid-1970s took him to Rome. In late 1963 he became a professor at the University of Chicago Divinity School, eventually being named Shailer Mathews Professor of Theology, until his retirement in March 1989. While on sabbatical in 1970, he taught at the University of Utrecht in the Netherlands; in 1975 he taught at Kyoto University in Japan, his lecture series there focusing on the environmental perils of industrialization. After his retirement he continued to lecture until 2001 at both the University of Virginia and Georgetown University. During this last period of his teaching career, he was also for three months a visiting professor at the Theology Division (now Divinity School) of Chung Chi College, the Chinese University of Hong Kong.

== Death ==
He died of meningitis on November 19, 2004, at the University of Virginia hospital in Charlottesville. He was 85.

== Theological work ==
Gilkey was a prolific author, with 15 books and over 100 articles to his credit. Perhaps his most widely read book was the story of his own religious-theological journey. In Shantung Compound: The Story of Men and Women Under Pressure (1966), Gilkey narrates his departure from the liberal Protestant belief system during World War II when he was made a prisoner of war in the "Civilian Internment Center" near Weixian for two-and-a-half years (1943–1945).

This experience was the basis for his modern interpretation of classical Reformation insights about individual and societal estrangement and self-delusion. Gilkey's new theology of history rethought Christianity and traditional views on sin, free will, providence, grace, eschatology and secular history.

Gilkey once responded to fellow theologian Edgar Brightman, who believed in God because man's history (to him) represented steady moral progress, saying "I believe in God, because to me, history precisely does not represent such a progress."

Gilkey was respected academically for his work on Reinhold Niebuhr and Paul Tillich, but was popularly known for his writings on science and religion. He argued against both Christian fundamentalist attacks on science and secularist attacks on religion. He was an expert witness for the American Civil Liberties Union in the 1981 McLean v. Arkansas lawsuit against an Arkansas State law mandating the teaching of creation sciences in high schools.

His early books and articles demonstrated the existential power of his experiences, from his early pacifist professions as a student at Harvard University, where his classmates included, among others, future President John F. Kennedy, Pete Seeger, and Cardinal Avery Dulles, to his teaching in China and his experiences as a POW.

His teachers, especially Niebuhr and Tillich, at Union Theological Seminary, helped him with methods and categories to formulate a powerful and creative theological vision of his own. In the 1970s and 1980s, Gilkey's theological vision was colored by the growth of Buddhism, and Sikhism as both religions began to influence religious life in America. He held the view most world religions enjoyed "rough parity". "The question for our age," he once wrote, "may well become, not will religion survive, as much as will we survive and with what sort of religion, a creative or demonic one?"

== Books ==
- Maker of Heaven and Earth: The Christian Doctrine of Creation in the Light of Modern Knowledge 1959. ISBN 9780819149763, OCLC 925316842
- Shantung Compound 1966. OCLC 718281479
- Naming the Whirlwind A Renewal of God Language 1970. OCLC 422018062
- Catholicism Confronts Modernity: A Protestant View 1975. ISBN 9780816411634, OCLC 815961187
- Reaping the Whirlwind: A Christian Interpretation of History 1976. ISBN 9780816403080, OCLC 462943771
- Message and Existence: An Introduction to Christian Theology 1979. ISBN 9780816404506, OCLC 421590741
- Through the Tempest: Theological Voyages in a Pluralistic Culture ISBN 9780800624842, OCLC 816005688
- Nature, Reality, and the Sacred: The Nexus of Science and Religion Minneapolis, Minn. : Fortress Press, 1993. ISBN 9780800627546, OCLC 816023043
- Creationism on Trial: Evolution and God at Little Rock 1985. ISBN 9780813918549, OCLC 869085338
- Religion and the Scientific Future: Reflections on Myth, Science, and Theology ISBN 9780865540309, OCLC 611010523
- Contemporary Explosion of Theology: Ecumenical Studies in Theology ISBN 9780810807945, OCLC 815962033
- Society and the Sacred: Toward a Theology of Culture in Decline ISBN 9780824500894, OCLC 815965033
- Gilkey on Tillich 1990. ISBN 9780824509910, OCLC 815994083
- Blue Twilight: Nature, Creationism, and American Religion
- On Niebuhr: A Theological Study 2001. ISBN 9780226293417, OCLC 468550954
