= Weixian Internment Camp =

WW2 Japanese internment camp for enemy civilians

Weihsien Internment Camp

Chinese name
- Traditional Chinese: 濰縣集中營
- Simplified Chinese: 潍县集中营
Transcriptions
Standard Mandarin
- Hanyu Pinyin: Wéixiàn Jízhōngyíng
- Wade–Giles: Wei^{2}hsien^{4} Chi^{2}chung^{1}ying^{2}
- Concentration camp
- Location of Weihsien Internment Camp in Shandong Province, China
- Coordinates: 36°42′08″N 119°07′35″E
- Other names: Weihsien Civilian Assembly Center
- Location: Weifang, China
- Original use: Presbyterian Mission Compound
- Operational: February 1943 – October 1945
- Number of inmates: more than 2,000 internees
- Liberated by: U.S. Army
- Notable books: Shantung Compound by Langdon Gilkey

The Weixian Internment Camp (Chinese: 濰縣集中營), better known historically as the Weihsien Internment Camp, was a Japanese-run internment camp called a "Civilian Assembly Center" in the former Wei County (濰縣; 潍县; Wéixiàn; Wei^{2}hsien^{4}), located near the city of Weifang, Shandong, China. The compound was used by the Japanese during World War II to intern civilians of Allied countries living in North China. The camp operated from March 1943 until October 1945 and more than 2,200 civilians were interned for all or part of the time the camp was open.

The majority of the people in the camp were British, but the population also included American, Canadian, Australian, Italian, Dutch, Belgian, Russian, and other nationalities. Most of the internees were either Christian missionaries or businessmen and their families. More than 350 children were among the internees. The children included the students of Chefoo boarding school, of whom 100 were separated from their parents throughout the war. Weihsien remained in operation until American paratroopers liberated the camp without opposition on 17 August 1945, although the last internee did not leave until October 1945.

Theologian Langdon Gilkey described the experience of an internee at Weihsien. "We suffered no extreme hardships of limb, stomach, or spirit...we were secure and comfortable enough to accomplish in large part the creation and maintenance of a small civilization, but our life was sufficiently close to the margin of survival to reveal the vast difficulties of that task."

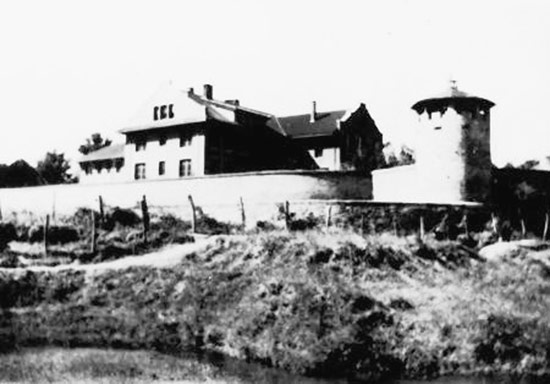
Weixian Internment Camp

== Background ==
Japanese occupation of China in 1940

In July 1937, Japan invaded China, triggering the Second Sino-Japanese War. The Japanese soon captured Beijing and most of the large cities of China. At that time tens of thousands of Europeans and Americans lived in China, mostly businessmen and Christian missionaries along with a sprinkling of scholars, artists, and White Russian refugees from the communist government of the Soviet Union. Although the U.S. and European governments recommended that their citizens leave China, many stayed on, although impacted by shortages of food and other essentials. On 8 December 1941, after the Japanese attack on Pearl Harbor, the Japanese began to seize the assets and register and monitor the activities of enemy nationals, mostly British and Americans, whose countries were at war with Japan.

The enemy nationals living in Beijing were not interned until March 1943. Enemy nationals were ordered by the Japanese to assemble on 25 March at their embassies and were marched to the railroad station. A crowd of Chinese watched the spectacle of foreigners, laden with all the possessions they could carry, walk to the station, a symbol that "the era of Western dominance" in China was over. A twenty-four hour train ride without food and water carried them to Weihsien where most of them were interned until the end of World War II. When the group of Beijing internees arrived at Weihsien, internees from Qingdao (Tsingtao) and Tianjin (Tientsin) were already there to greet them, as well as a large contingent of Roman Catholic priests and nuns.

A large number of internees arrived from Chefoo (Yantai) in September 1943. They numbered 371 persons, mostly British and including 118 students, ages 6 to 18, of the Chefoo School, a Protestant missionary-supported boarding school. Initially, the Japanese expelled the students and staff from the school and interned them in the city of Chefoo. Later, they moved all the Chefoo internees by ship and train to Weihsien.

Overall, in the countries occupied by Japan during World War II, approximately 125,000 enemy nationals were interned. Of those 125,000, ten percent were in China and Hong Kong. In China, Weihsien was one of the largest internment camps, called "Civilian Assembly Centers" by the Japanese.

== Courtyard of the Happy Way ==
Internees at Weihsien were housed in a former Presbyterian mission compound that was called the "Courtyard of the Happy Way" (Chinese: 乐道院; pinyin: Lè dào yuàn). The walled compound where the internees lived was 5 km (3.1 miles) from the city of Weihsien. The compound was about the size of a large city block, slightly more than 6 acres (2.4 ha) in size. An internee described the dilapidated compound as "bare walls, bare floors, dim electric lights, no running water, primitive latrines, two houses with showers, three huge public kitchens, a desecrated church, and a dismantled hospital." The Japanese guards lived in an adjoining area of better houses, formerly the homes of missionaries. The compound was surrounded by farmland.

Not all of the internees sent to Weihsien remained there. The largest group to leave Weihsien were 438 Roman Catholic priests and nuns who, on 16 August 1943, were transferred out of Weihsien and sent to Beijing where they were confined in their religious houses. A few Catholics elected to stay in Weihsien and would become the cleverest of the camp's black marketers.

In September 1943, 1,525 Americans, Canadians, and Latin Americans were repatriated from Japanese-controlled civilian internment camps in East Asia, including 395 from Weihsien. By agreement with Japan, the prisoners were exchanged for Japanese civilian prisoners of the United States. The Wiehsien repatriates were sent by railroad to Shanghai, where they were loaded aboard the Japanese ship Teia Maru. They departed Shanghai on 19 September and sailed to Goa, a Portuguese colony in India. There, they boarded the Swedish Mercy Ship, Gripsholm, on 19 October and, after several stops to release repatriates, arrived in New York City on 1 December. People chosen for the repatriation voyage were on a list compiled by the U.S. and other governments of priority individuals for repatriation. The majority of those repatriated were missionaries and businessmen working for large American companies.

After the transfers and repatriation, the population in Weihsien consisted of 1,093 British, 202 Americans, 42 Belgians, 28 Dutch, and 58 of other nationalities, of whom 358 were children. They were joined on 30 December 1943 by 107 Italians who were interned after Italy's surrender to the allies. The Italians were housed in a separate section of Weihsien. The population from then until the camp was abolished was more than 1,500 internees. The largest number of internees were missionaries and businessmen and their families, but the internees were a diverse lot, coming from both the highest echelons of Western society in China and the lowest. Among rich businessmen and pious missionaries were prostitutes, alcoholics, and drug addicts. Several internees were of mixed-blood. A jazz band of four African-Americans and a Filipino guitar player, called "Pineapple," were among the internees.

The Japanese garrison at Weihsien consisted of a commandant, his staff of five, and 30 to 40 guards. However, the Japanese were little present within the camp. The internees were autonomous on most matters with the Japanese issuing orders and fielding requests of the internees through the internee leaders. As the war wore on the Japanese in the Weihsien area were increasingly isolated and surrounded by communist and nationalist guerillas opposed to their occupation of China. After the war, the camp commandant, Mr. Izu, was charged with war crimes, but a former internee leader, Ted McLaren, testified in his defense and Izu was acquitted.

== Government and politics ==
Shortly after the arrival of most of the internees in March 1943, the Japanese commandant ordered them to create 9 committees for different functions in the management of the camp. A council of the chairmen of the 9 committees represented the camp in relations with the Japanese. The internees decided that each committee would have four members, representing the four groups of internees in the camp at that time: internees from Beijing, Qingdao, Tianjin, and Catholic clerics. Each committee selected a chairman. Businessmen heading large British and American companies in China dominated the leadership. The Japanese did not allow the internees to select a single overall leader.

At first the committee members were selected by the self-appointed leaders of the internees, but, after challenges to the legitimacy of their authority, they were selected by elections held every six months for committee chairmen. "While politically we became a democracy," Gilkey said, "economically our society remained completely socialist...all the means of production were managed by representatives of the community as a whole and not by private individuals." The two problems most encountered were "how do you get a lazy man to work?" and the conundrum of how to ensure that a scarce commodity (food) was distributed in a fair and equitable manner to all internees. The distribution of another scarce commodity (housing) was also fraught with difficulty and conflict.

== Daily life ==
To survive, the internees created kitchens and a hospital, started a library, and educated their children without desks, chairs, or a classroom and with few books. Since the internment camp was in squalid condition, people from all walks of life came together to cook and help in the kitchens, stoke the ovens, clean the latrines, and perform other tasks.

=== Sanitation and water ===
Sanitary facilities were inadequate for 1,500 internees. Only 23 pit toilets in four locations were in the compound and the daily line to use them was long. A "Latrine patrol," mostly of Protestant and Catholic missionaries, was created to supervise the use of and to clean the latrines. Eventually Chinese farmers were allowed into the compound to haul away the "night soil" they valued to fertilize their crops. Latrine workers had the right to take a shower every day while most internees were limited to one shower a week. The internees dug several cesspits where internees could deposit the contents of their chamber pots. Some of the more fortunate among the internees paid others, often with a can of coffee, to stand in for them for their shift in the latrines. The often inadequate water supply of the compound came from several wells.

=== Food ===
Food was the major concern of the internees. Three large kitchens cooked and served meals. The smallest of the three kitchens was allocated to the Italians, and the other two served the remainder of the internees. A small "diet kitchen" fed people with special needs or in the hospital. The internees had four sources of food. The most important was the issue by the Japanese of a small amount of locally procured meat and a more plentiful supply of vegetables such as cabbage, greens, radishes, and eggplants. Each small child received a cup of milk almost daily. A second source was a canteen where people with money could buy luxury items such as fresh fruit and peanut oil procured from local farmers. A monthly loan of 5 dollars called "comfort money" was provided to people of most nationalities among the internees by a Swiss diplomat who periodically visited Weihsien. A third source was the thriving black market (of which more later) and fourth was the arrival and distribution in the camp of food parcels from the American Red Cross (also more later). All these sources dwindled as the war continued and, although there was no starvation, some men lost 50 or more pounds.

The most important item in the diet of the internees was bread which along with tea and vegetable soup, sometimes with a bit of meat, comprised every meal. Prior to the arrival of the internees, the Japanese set up a bakery in the compound and they provided flour. Two elderly Persian bakers were among the internees and they trained a corps of internee bakers to staff the bakery. In 1944 the Japanese reduced the supply of flour and rationing of bread began.

==== Red Cross food parcels ====
Periodically, the Japanese captors permitted food to be sent by mail to internees by individuals and international organizations. The outside sources of food, including that obtained from the black market, fended off actual starvation. Early in the internment period, Catholics in Beijing sent food parcels to the Catholic priests and nuns in Weihsien. In July 1944, food parcels from the American Red Cross arrived in the camp and each American received a parcel. Later, in January 1945, as the food situation in the camp was becoming desperate, an enormous supply of food parcels from the American Red Cross arrived at the camp by donkey cart. About 1500 parcels arrived, each of them weighing about 20 kilograms (44 lb) and containing canned meat, butter, cigarettes, cheese, powdered milk, coffee, and chocolate. The number of parcels was sufficient to give one parcel to each person in the camp, but several Americans, including missionaries, protested that parcels from the American Red Cross should be distributed only to the 200 Americans in the camp, and that each American should receive seven and one-half parcels. A bitter stand-off between the Americans and the other nationalities in the camp ensued until the Japanese decided that each person in the camp would receive one parcel. The incident created a lasting animosity in the camp between the Americans and others. Langdon Gilkey, an American, said that "Had there been no Japanese guns guaranteeing order in the camp, we might easily have faced real strife. Thus might our community have destroyed itself."

=== Health and medical care ===
Thirty-one people died during their internment at Weihsien, including Eric Liddell, a missionary and an Olympic gold medalist. Thirty-three children were born.

When the internees began arriving at Weihsien in March 1943, the hospital had been wrecked and looted. Within ten days, the doctors and nurses had the place functioning with an operating room, a laboratory, pharmacy, and a diet center. One patient with appendicitis was sent to a hospital in Tianjin by train before the operating room was available. He died en route. The most important problem of the hospital was a lack of drugs. In 1944, two escapees from Weihsien reported to the American Army that medicines were desperately needed. The Army dropped four large boxes of sulfa and other drugs to guerrilla forces. The guerillas gave the drugs to the Swiss Consul, V.E. Egger, who visited Weihsien monthly. Through a subterfuge he managed to get the medicines past the Japanese guards and into the camp. The health of the internees was described by a U.S Embassy report (presumably with information provided by the Swiss Consul) as "surprisingly good" despite inadequate nutrition.

=== Housing ===
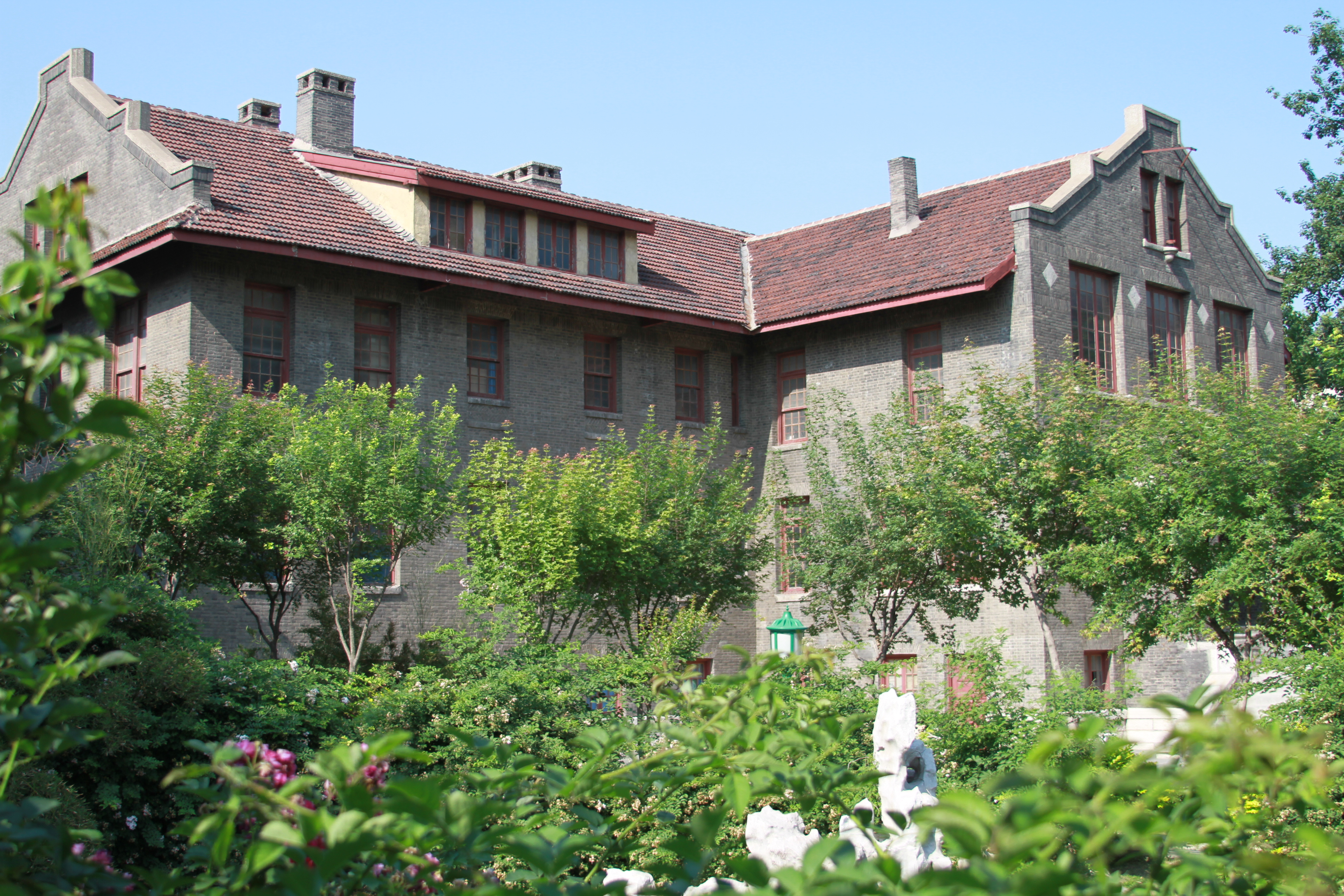
Building of the former Le Dao Yuan mission compound

At Weihsien, there were more housing units than most other Japanese internment camps. Each person was allowed to have around forty-five square feet of space. Single women and men were separated on different sides of the buildings; women on one side and men on the other. The internees were placed in the basements of rooms of the hospital, school buildings, and previous Chinese dormitories. Family housing was set up in compounds, with long rows of rooms that usually held a family of two to four people each. The rooms were approximately nine by twelve feet. Some internees were placed into classrooms for sleeping. In the classrooms, the number of people could range from around ten to thirty people.

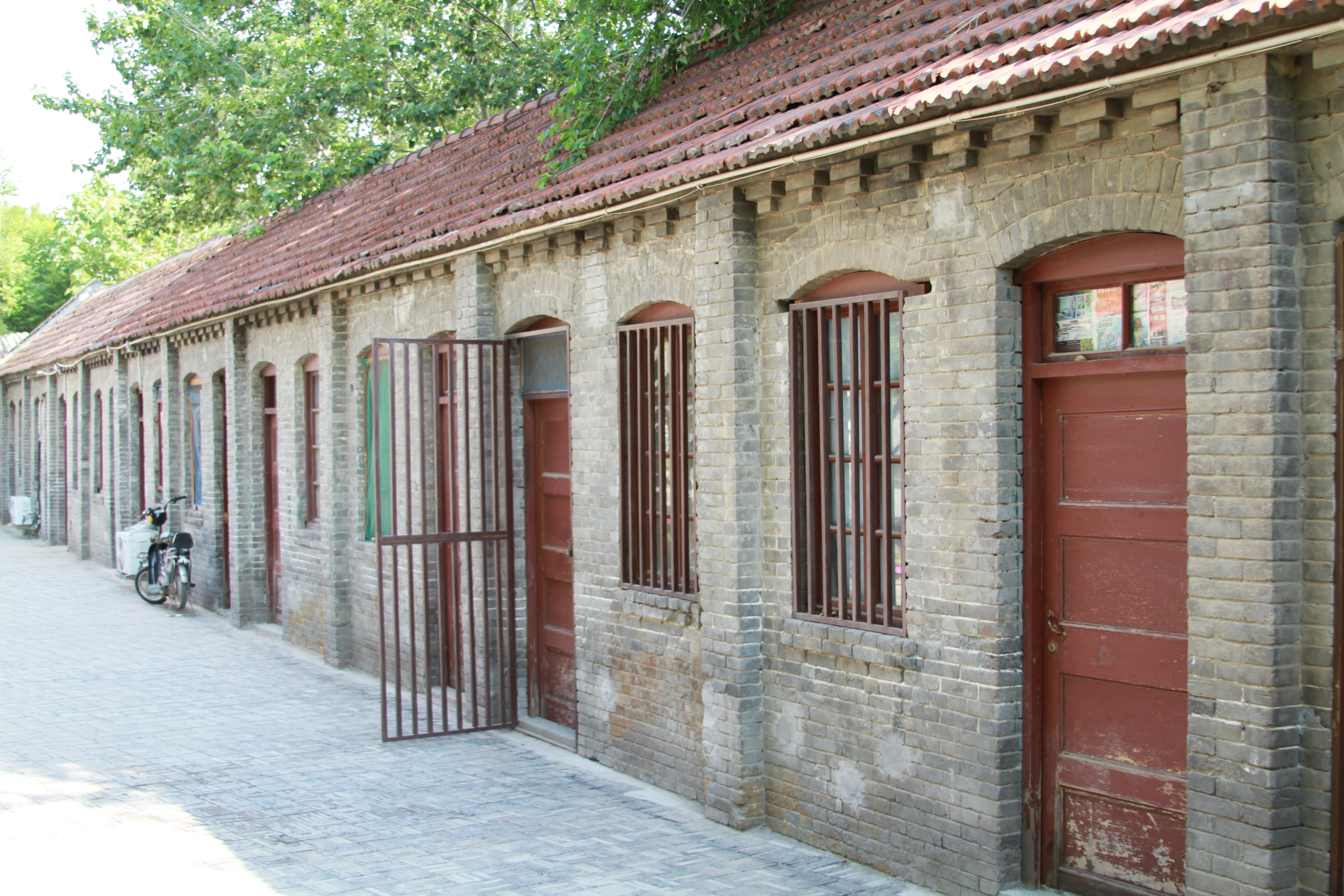
Yard of the former internment camp. Families with children were housed in the small rooms of this building.

=== Black marketing ===
Weixian liberation monument (Sculpture designer: Liu Zewen)

The length of the compound wall coupled with the paucity of Japanese guards facilitated extensive black marketing, especially for food and most especially for eggs. Chinese farmers brought their produce to the compound wall and internees paid them with money or valuables and smuggled the goods over the wall or though holes in the wall created by removing bricks. Gilkey calculated that early in their imprisonment 1,300 eggs per day were being smuggled into the compound. Efforts by the Japanese to halt the black marketing included executing two Chinese farmers. After a hiatus, the black market started up again in July 1944 and, this time, the Japanese guards became the middlemen, facilitating the trade in exchange for a commission. The produce brought into the camp via the black marketers, whose most successful practitioners were Catholic priests and monks, was important for the nutrition of the internees. Children were given a tablespoon per day of crushed egg shells as a calcium supplement.

== Resistance and escape ==
A Belgian Jesuit priest, Father Raymond J. de Jaegher (zh:雷震遠), fluent in Chinese, developed a system for establishing contact with the Chinese Nationalist guerilla forces and hence the Chinese and American governments. De Jaegher began by throwing bricks over the compound wall to the black marketing Chinese outside. The bricks had messages tied to them with money and instructions for delivery to the addressees. Later, as Japanese security tightened, de Jaeger volunteered to supervise the Chinese workers allowed inside Weihsien to empty the cesspools of night soil. The cesspool workers carried concealed messages in and out of the camp for de Jaegher.

Along with a British businessman, Laurence Tipton, de Jaegher made plans to escape Weihsien, but his superior discouraged him, fearing Japanese reprisals on the camp. An American, Arthur Hummel, Jr., a scholar of Chinese, was recruited to take de Jaegher's place in the escape. With the assistance of Chinese-American Roy Tchoo and black-marketer Tommy Wade, on the night of 9/10 June 1944, Tipton and Hummel successfully escaped over the wall and joined Nationalist Chinese guerrillas in the region. Through continued contact with de Jaegher, Tipton and Hummel were able to keep the internees up to date on events outside Weihsien camp and stimulate the Americans to send Red Cross food parcels to the people in the camp who were near starvation. Prior to the escape the morning roll call of internees had been perfunctory. Afterwards, the Japanese dictated two roll calls per day, each of which lasted up to an hour.

== American liberation ==
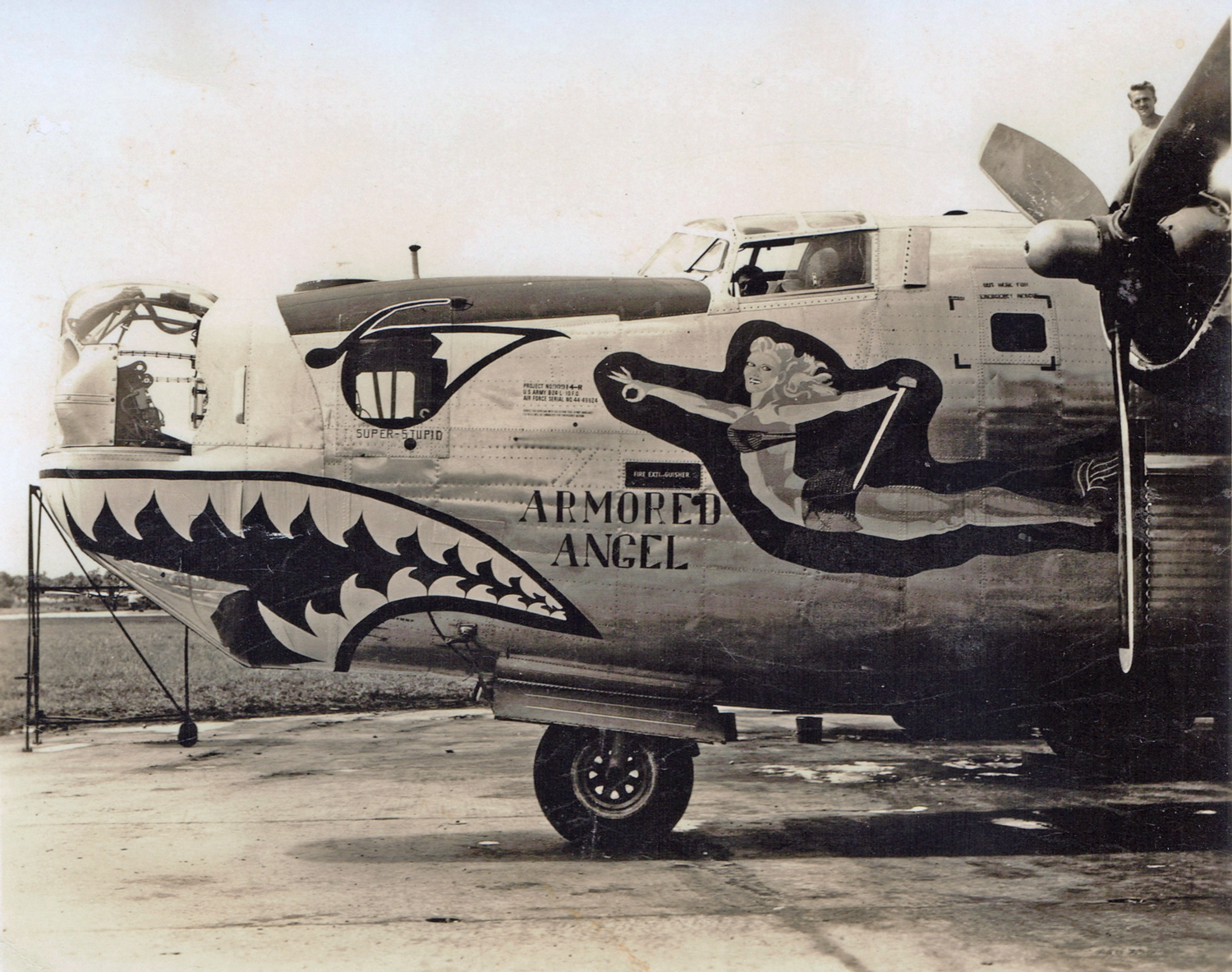
The 'Armored Angel', a WWII-era Consolidated B-24 Liberator airplane

On August 17, 1945, two days after the official Japanese surrender to the Allies, a small rescue team parachuted from the 'Armored Angel', an American B24 Bomber. The team included six Americans (Major Stanley Staiger, Ensign Jimmy Moore, Lt. Jim Hannon, Raymond Hanchulak, Sgt. Peter Orlich, Sgt. Tad Nagaki) and one Chinese interpreter ("Eddie" Wang Chenghan 王成汉). The 'Duck Mission', conducted under the auspices of the OSS, successfully liberated 1,500 Allied civilian prisoners.

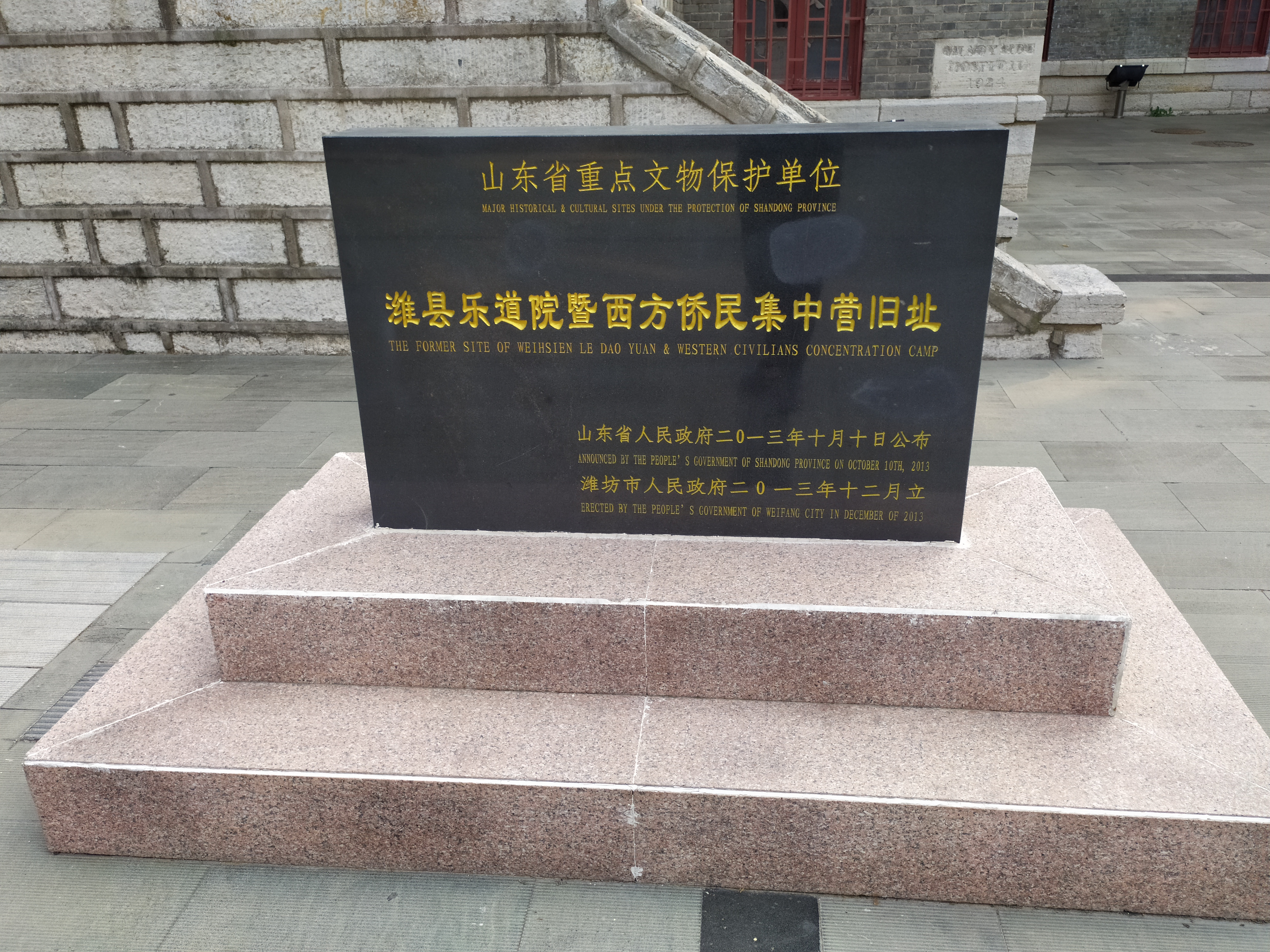
Weihsien Internment Camp became the major historical and cultural site under the protection of Shandong province on October 13, 2013

== Notable internees ==
- Reginald Bazire, Anglican Priest and Missionary
- Michael Boycott, Secretary of the Hong Kong Jockey Club and amateur jockey
- Mary Gladys Cookingham, Bursar at Yenching University from 1922 to 1948. Mary was repatriated to the US in 1943 on the MS Gripsholm. Mary married Vernon Nash in 1958 after she had retired and they lived in Santa Barbara, CA. Vernon was a widower and Mary had known him at Yenching University during the years that she worked in China.
- Joseph Cotterill, Priest
- Walter Wiley Davis, Educator/Yenching Geology faculty/Methodist Missionary
- Langdon Brown Gilkey, American Protestant Ecumenical theologian
- Watson McMillan Hayes, helped to set up Shandong College/Shandong University
- Dixon Edward Hoste, Missionary (CIM), member of the Cambridge Seven
- Arthur W. Hummel, Jr., later American Ambassador to China (1981–85)
- Alfred Jennings, Missionary (CIM)
- May Palmer Jennings, Missionary (CIM)
- Jessie Jennings, Missionary (CIM)
- Asta Marie Kvarme, Missionary from Norway
- Eric Liddell, Scottish athlete, Olympic gold and bronze-medal winner (1924), rugby union international player, and missionary. Died at the compound 21 February 1945 (aged 43). The film The Last Race (AKA On Wings of Eagles) depicts Liddell's time at the camp, with Joseph Fiennes as Eric Liddell. He was also depicted in the multiple-Oscar-winning film Chariots of Fire.
- Ted McLaren, Scotland international rugby union player - Chairman of the Disciplinary Committee at the camp.
- Alice F. Moore, Principal, Peking American School
- Mary Previte, educator and American Democratic Party politician who served in the New Jersey General Assembly, where she represented the sixth legislative district from 1998 to 2006.
- Lope "Papa" Sarreal, Sr., The "Grand Old Man of Philippine Boxing"
- Paul Thompson, British Sinologist
- E. T. C. Werner, British Consul and Sinologist
- John E. Woods, Missionary; later a doctor at the Mayo Clinic
- Mary C. Wright and Arthur F. Wright, historians of China; Professors at Yale University; Mary was the first tenured woman professor in the School of Arts and Sciences at Yale University
