= Wen Xuan =

Anthology of Chinese poetry and literature

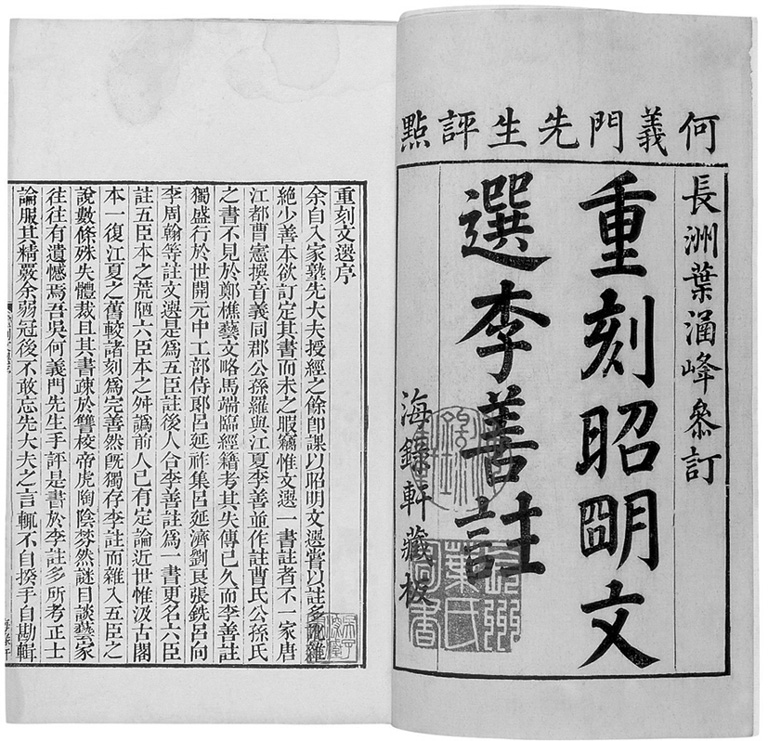
- An edition of the Wen Xuan printed around 1700
- Author: (compiler) Xiao Tong, Crown Prince of Liang
- Original title: 文選

Wen xuan
- "Wenxuan" in Traditional (top) and Simplified (bottom) Chinese characters
- Traditional Chinese: 文選
- Simplified Chinese: 文选
- Literal meaning: "Selections of [Refined] Literature"
Transcriptions
Standard Mandarin
- Hanyu Pinyin: Wén Xuǎn
- Gwoyeu Romatzyh: Wen Sheuan
- Wade–Giles: Wên^{2} Hsüan^{3}
- IPA: [wə̌n ɕɥɛ̀n]
Yue: Cantonese
- Yale Romanization: Màhn Syún
- Jyutping: Man^{4} Syun^{2}
- IPA: [mɐn˩ syn˧˥]
Southern Min
- Tâi-lô: Bûn Suán
Middle Chinese
- Middle Chinese: mjun süén

The Wen Xuan ([wə̌n.ɕɥɛ̀n]; Chinese: 文選), usually translated Selections of Refined Literature, is one of the earliest and most important anthologies of Chinese poetry and literature, and is one of the world's oldest literary anthologies to be arranged by topic. It is a selection of what were judged to be the best poetic and prose pieces from the late Warring States period (c. 300 BC) to the early Liang dynasty (c. AD 500), excluding the Chinese Classics and philosophical texts. The Wen Xuan preserves most of the greatest fu rhapsody and shi poetry pieces from the Qin and Han dynasties, and for much of pre-modern history was one of the primary sources of literary knowledge for educated Chinese.

The Wen Xuan was compiled between AD 520 and 530 in the city of Jiankang (modern Nanjing) during the Liang dynasty by Xiao Tong, the eldest son of Emperor Wu of Liang, and a group of scholars he had assembled. The Liang dynasty, though short-lived, was a period of intense literary activity, and the ruling Xiao family ensured that eminent writers and scholars were frequently invited to the imperial and provincial courts. As Crown Prince, Xiao Tong received the best classical Chinese education available and began selecting pieces for his new anthology in his early twenties. The Wen Xuan contains 761 separate pieces organized into 37 literary categories, the largest and most well known being "Rhapsodies" (fu) and "Lyric Poetry" (shi).

Study of the Wen Xuan enjoyed immense popularity during the Tang dynasty (618–907), and its study rivalled that of the Five Classics during that period. The Wen Xuan was required reading for any aspiring scholar and official even into the Song dynasty. Throughout the Yuan and Ming dynasties study of the Wen Xuan lapsed out of popularity, though the great philologists of the Qing dynasty revived its study to some extent.

Three volumes of the first full English translation of the Wen Xuan have been published by the American sinologist David R. Knechtges, professor emeritus of Chinese at the University of Washington, who aims to eventually complete the translation in five additional volumes.

== History ==
=== Compilation ===
The Wen Xuan was compiled during the 520s by Xiao Tong—the son and heir apparent of Emperor Wu of Liang—at the Liang capital Jiankang (modern Nanjing) with the assistance of his closest friends and associates. Xiao was a precocious child and received an excellent classical Chinese education. His two official biographies both state that by age four he had memorized the Five Classics and at age eight gave a relatively competent lecture on the Classic of Filial Piety to a group of assembled scholars. As Xiao matured, he developed a love of scholarship and books, and by his early teenage years the library of the Eastern Palace – the Crown Prince's official residence – contained over 30,000 volumes.

Xiao spent much of his leisure time in the company of the leading Chinese scholars of his day, and their serious discussions of literature impelled the creation of the Wen Xuan. His main purpose in creating the Wen Xuan was the creation of a suitable anthology of the best individual works of belles-lettres available, and he ignored philosophical works in favor of aesthetically beautiful poetry and other writings. In the Wen Xuan's preface, Xiao explains that four major types of Chinese writing were deliberately excluded from it: 1) the traditional "Classics" that were anciently attributed to the Duke of Zhou and Confucius, such as the Classic of Changes (I Ching) and the Classic of Poetry (Shi jing); 2) writings of philosophical "masters", such as the Laozi (Dao De Jing), the Zhuangzi, and the Mencius; 3) collections of rhetorical speeches, such as the Intrigues of the Warring States (Zhan guo ce); and 4) historical narratives and chronicles such as the Zuo Tradition (Zuo zhuan). After Xiao Tong's death in 531 he was given the posthumous name Zhaoming (昭明; "Resplendent Brilliance"), and so the collection came to be known as the "Zhaoming Wen xuan". Despite its massive influence on Chinese literature, Xiao's categories and editorial choices have occasionally been criticized throughout Chinese history for a number of odd or illogical choices.

=== Manuscripts ===
A large number of manuscripts and fragments of the Wen Xuan have survived to modern times. Many were discovered among the Dunhuang manuscripts and are held in various museums around the world, particularly at the British Library and Bibliothèque Nationale de France, as well as in Japan, where the Wen Xuan was well known from at least the 7th century. One manuscript, held in the Eisei Bunko Museum, is a rare fragment of a Wen Xuan commentary that may predate Li Shan's authoritative commentary from the mid-6th century.

== Contents ==
The Wen Xuan contains 761 works organized into 37 separate categories: Rhapsodies (賦; fu), Lyric Poetry (詩; shī), Chu-style Elegies (騷; sāo), Sevens (七; qī), Edicts (詔; zhào), Patents of Enfeoffment (册; cè), Commands (令; lìng), Instructions (教; jiào), Examination Prompts (策文; cèwén), Memorials (表; biǎo), Letters of Submission (上書; shàngshū), Communications (啓; qǐ), Memorials of Impeachment (彈事; tánshì), Memoranda (牋; jiān), Notes of Presentation (奏記; zòujì), Letters (書; shū), Proclamations of War (檄; xí), Responses to Questions (對問; duìwèn), Hypothetical Discourses (設論; shè lùn), Mixed song/rhapsody (辭; cí), Prefaces (序; xù), Praise Poems (頌; sòng), Encomia for Famous Men (贊; zàn), Prophetic Signs (符命; fú mìng), Historical Treatises (史論; shǐ lùn), Historical Evaluations and Judgments (史述贊; shǐ shù zàn), Treatises (論; lùn), "Linked Pearls" (連珠; liánzhū), Admonitions (箴; zhēn), Inscriptions (銘; míng), Dirges (誄; lěi), Laments (哀; aī), Epitaphs (碑; béi), Grave Memoirs (墓誌; mùzhì), Conduct Descriptions (行狀; xíngzhuàng), Condolences (弔文; diàowén), and Offerings (祭; jì).

The first group of categories – the "Rhapsodies" (fu) and "Lyric Poetry" (shi), and to a lesser extent the "Chu-style Elegies" and "Sevens" – are the largest and most important of the Wen Xuan. Its 55 fu, in particular, are a "remarkably representative selection of major works", and includes most of the greatest fu masterpieces, such as Sima Xiangru's "Fu on the Excursion Hunt of the Emperor" (天子遊獵賦; Tiānzǐ yóuliè fù), Yang Xiong's "Fu on the Sweet Springs Palace" (甘泉賦; Gān Quán fù), Ban Gu's "Fu on the Two Capitals" (兩都賦; Liǎng dū fù), and Zhang Heng's "Fu on the Two Metropolises" (二京賦; Èr jīng fù).

== Annotations ==
The first annotations to the Wen Xuan appeared sixty to seventy years after its publication and were produced by Xiao Tong's cousin Xiao Gai. Cao Xian, Xu Yan, Li Shan, Gongsun Luo, and other scholars of the late Sui dynasty and Tang dynasty helped promote the Wen Xuan until it became the focus of an entire branch of literature study: an early 7th century scholar from Yangzhou named Cao Xian (曹憲) produced a work entitled "Pronunciation and Meaning in the Wen Xuan" (文選音義; Wénxuǎn Yīnyì) and the others – who were his students – each produced their own annotations to the collection.

=== Li Shan commentary ===
Li Shan (李善, d. 689) was a student of Cao Xian and a minor official who served on the staff of Li Hong, a Crown Prince of the early Tang dynasty. Li had an encyclopedic knowledge of early Chinese language and literature which he used to create a detailed commentary to the Wen Xuan that he submitted to the imperial court of Emperor Gaozong of Tang in 658, though he may have later expanded and revised it with the assistance of his son Li Yong (李邕). Li's annotations, which have been termed "models of philological rigor", are some of the most exemplary in all of Chinese literature, giving accurate glosses of rare and difficult words and characters, as well as giving source information and loci classici for notable passages. His commentary is still recognized as the most useful and important tool for reading and studying the Wen Xuan in the original Chinese.

=== "Five Officials" commentary ===
In 718, during the reign of Emperor Xuanzong of Tang, a new Wen Xuan commentary by court officials Lü Yanji, Liu Liang, Zhang Xian, Lü Xiang, and Li Zhouhan entitled "Collected Commentaries of the Five Officials" (五臣集注; Wǔchén jí zhù) was submitted to the imperial court. This "Five Officials" commentary is longer and contains more paraphrases of difficult lines than Li Shan's annotations, but is also full of erroneous and far-fetched glosses and interpretations.

=== Later editions ===
Besides the Li Shan and "Five Officials" commentaries, a number of other Wen Xuan editions seem to have circulated during the Tang dynasty. Almost none of these other editions have survived to modern times, though a number of manuscripts have been preserved in Japan. A number of fragments of the Wen Xuan or commentaries to it were rediscovered in Japan in the 1950s, including one from Dunhuang discovered in the Eisei Bunko Museum and a complete manuscript of a shorter Kujō (九條, Jiǔtiáo) edition printed as early as 1099. The best known of these other editions is "Collected Commentaries of the Wen Xuan" (文選集注; Wénxuǎn jízhù) (Monzen shūchū), an edition of unknown authorship that contains some old Tang dynasty commentaries that were lost in China.

Published during the reign of Emperor Zhezong of Song, in the second lunar month of 1094, the Youzhou Prefecture Study Book contained the first compilation of the annotations of both the Five Officials and Li Shan. The later Annotations of the Six Scholars edition (i.e. the Five Officials and Li Shan), such as Guang Dupei's woodblock printing and the Mingzhou printing was the most well-known edition of the Youzhou book. Another edition, called the Annotations of the Six Officials, which had Ganzhou and Jianzhou versions, was based on the Six Scholars edition but altered the ordering of certain sections.

In the early 19th century, Qing dynasty scholar Hu Kejia produced a collated and textually critical edition entitled Kao Yi (考異; 'A Study of the Differences'). This edition became the basis for most modern printings of the Wen Xuan, such as the Zhonghua Book Company's 1977 edition and the Shanghai Guji's 1986 edition.

== Influence ==
By the early 8th century the Wen Xuan had become an important text that all young men were expected to master in preparation for literary examinations. Famed poet Du Fu advised his son Du Zongwu to "master thoroughly the principles of the Wen Xuan." Copies of the Wen Xuan were obtained by nearly all families that could afford them in order to help their sons study the literary styles of the works it contained. This practice continued into the Song dynasty until the imperial examination reforms of the late 11th century. In the mid-16th century, during the Ming dynasty, an abridged version of the Wen Xuan was created to help aspiring officials study composition for the eight-legged essays on Ming-era imperial exams.

=== Influence in Japan ===
The Wen Xuan (Japanese: Mon-zen) was transmitted to Japan sometime after its initial publication and had become required reading for the Japanese aristocracy by the Heian period. Admired for its beauty, many terms from the Wen Xuan made their way into Japanese as loanwords and are still used.

== Translations ==
=== French ===
- Margouliès, Georges (1926), Le "Fou" dans le Wen siuan: Étude et textes, Paris: Paul Geuthner.

=== German ===
- von Zach, Erwin (1958), Fang, Ilse Martin (ed.), Die Chinesische Anthologie: Übersetzungen aus dem Wen Hsüan, Cambridge, Mass.: Harvard-Yenching Studies, Harvard University Press.

=== Japanese ===
- Uchida, Sennosuke 內田泉之助; Ami, Yuji 網祐次 (1963–64), Monzen: Shihen 文選: 詩篇, vol. 2 vols., Tokyo: Meiji shoin.
- Obi, Kōichi 小尾郊一; Hanabusa, Hideki 花房英樹 (1974–76), Monzen 文選, vol. 7 vols, Tokyo: Shūeisha.
- Nakajima, Chiaki 中島千秋 (1977), Monzen: Fuhen 文選: 賦篇, Tokyo: Meiji shoin.

=== English ===
- Knechtges, David R. (1982), Wen Xuan or Selections of Refined Literature, Volume 1: Rhapsodies on Metropolises and Capitals, Princeton: Princeton University Press.
- ———— (1987), Wen Xuan or Selections of Refined Literature, Volume 2: Rhapsodies on Sacrifices, Hunting, Travel, Sightseeing, Palaces and Halls, Rivers and Seas, Princeton: Princeton University Press.
- ———— (1996), Wen Xuan or Selections of Refined Literature, Volume 3: Rhapsodies on Natural Phenomena, Birds and Animals, Aspirations and Feelings, Sorrowful Laments, Literature, Music, and Passions, Princeton: Princeton University Press.
