= Cao Xian (scholar) =

Cao Xian (541–645), a native of Jiangdu County, Yangzhou, was a scholar of the Chen dynasty, the Sui dynasty, and the Tang dynasty.

He was ordered by Sui Yang Emperor to order and edit the hundred volumes 《桂苑珠丛》. He also authored a number of studies and commentaries including 《博雅音》, 《古今字圖雜錄》, 《文字指歸》, 《小學總錄》, 《揚州記》, 《文選音義》. He advised Emperor Taizong of Tang on understanding of classical texts. After retiring from imperial service he taught many disciplines.
