= Religion in Aberdeen =

Whilst religious affiliation within Aberdeen is diverse, the majority of the population (58%) declared no religion in the 2021 United Kingdom census. Christianity is the dominant religion with 30% of the population associating their beliefs with Christian churches including the Church of Scotland and the Catholic Church.

== Christianity ==
The largest Christian church in Aberdeen is the presbyterian Church of Scotland overseen by the Presbytery of the North East and Northern Isles which manages 23 parishes within the city boundary.

The Catholic Church has 10 congregations in the city, which is within the Diocese of Aberdeen.

The Scottish Episcopal Church has 9 congregations in Aberdeen with a total membership of 993. The city is within the episcopal Diocese of Aberdeen and Orkney.

The Church of Jesus Christ of Latter-day Saints has two congregations in the city, and the Jehovah's Witnesses have one.

In the Middle Ages, Aberdeen contained houses of the Carmelites (Whitefriars) and Franciscans (Greyfriars), the latter surviving in modified form as the chapel of Marischal College as late as the early 20th century.

Also churches still in use today are located in the city centre including Bon Accord Free Church which is situated on Rosemount viaduct near His Majesty's Theatre, Gerrard Street Baptist Church, and Gilcomston South Church situated at the corner of Union Street and Summer Street. Many other churches in the city centre have been converted into bars and restaurants.

=== Kirk of St Nicholas ===
In the Middle Ages there was only one burgh kirk - the Kirk of St Nicholas, one of Scotland's largest parish churches. Like a number of other Scottish kirks, it was subdivided after the Reformation, in this case into the East and West churches. The Kirk of St Nicholas congregation is now an ecumenical partnership in membership of both the Church of Scotland and the United Reformed Church. The large kirkyard of the Kirk of St Nicholas is separated from Union Street by a 147 ft (45 m) long Ionic façade, built in 1831. The divided church within, with a central tower and spire, forms one continuous building 220 ft (67 m) in length.

=== St Machar's Cathedral ===
The pre-Reformation Diocese of Aberdeen is said to have been first founded at Mortlach in Banffshire by Máel Coluim II (1005–1034) to celebrate his victory there over the Danes, but in 1137 David I (1124–1153) transferred the bishopric to Old Aberdeen, and twenty years later St Machar's Cathedral was begun, a few hundred yards from the river Don. With the exception of the period of the episcopate of William Elphinstone (1484–1511), building progressed slowly. Gavin Dunbar, who followed him in 1518, completed the structure by adding the two western spires and the southern transept. The church suffered severely at the Reformation, but is still used by the Church of Scotland as a parish church.

=== St Mary's Cathedral ===
St Mary's Cathedral is the Roman Catholic cathedral. A Gothic Revival building, it was erected in 1859.

=== St. Andrew's Cathedral ===
St. Andrew's Cathedral is the Scottish Episcopal Cathedral. It was constructed in 1817, as St Andrew's Chapel, and was Archibald Simpson's first commission. The church was raised to Cathedral status in 1914. The Episcopal Church in Aberdeen is notable for having consecrated the first bishop of the Episcopal Church in the United States of America, Samuel Seabury. The cathedral was renovated in the 1930s to commemorate the 150th anniversary of Seabury's consecration. The memorial was dedicated with a ceremony attended by the then US ambassador to the UK, Joseph P. Kennedy Sr.

=== Other Churches ===
Belmont Street at the turn of the 19th century was better known as Holy Street as crowds would file out of six churches set over the 400 metre road. The last remaining church congregation in Belmont Street has now moved to Union Square South. Triple Kirks pub, The Academy Shopping mall, Neptune Night Club, and Slain's Castle theme pub is all that remains of the 19th-century traditional church. Ironically the last church to be in Belmont Street was the charismatic newfrontiers church, Christ Central, which met in the Belmont Picturehouse. On Justice Street, is the category B listed St Peter's Roman Catholic Church which opened in 1804.

== Islam ==
Aberdeen's first mosque, Aberdeen Mosque and Islamic Centre, opened in October 1978 on Spital in Old Aberdeen. It moved to Frederick Street in March 2022, with the Spital mosque retained with a reduced capacity.

Another mosque, Masjid Alhikmah, opened on 3 May 2018.

== Other religions ==
Other religion in Aberdeen and the North East of Scotland is represented through Aberdeen Synagogue and Jewish Community Centre, a small Jewish congregation. The city also has a Unitarian community and the Hazelhead area holds a Thai Buddhist temple. The University of Aberdeen has a small society of the Baháʼí Faith.

== Gallery ==
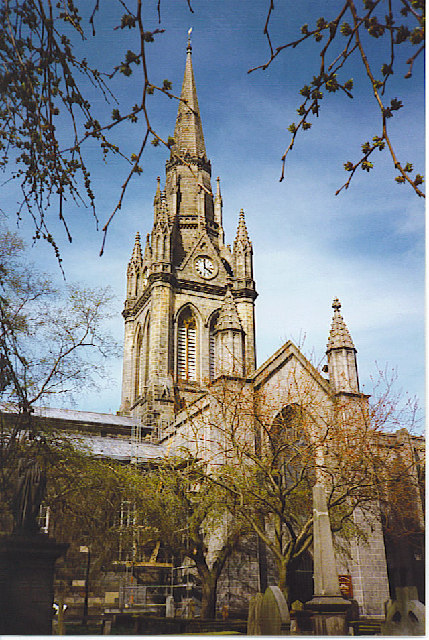
Kirk of St Nicholas

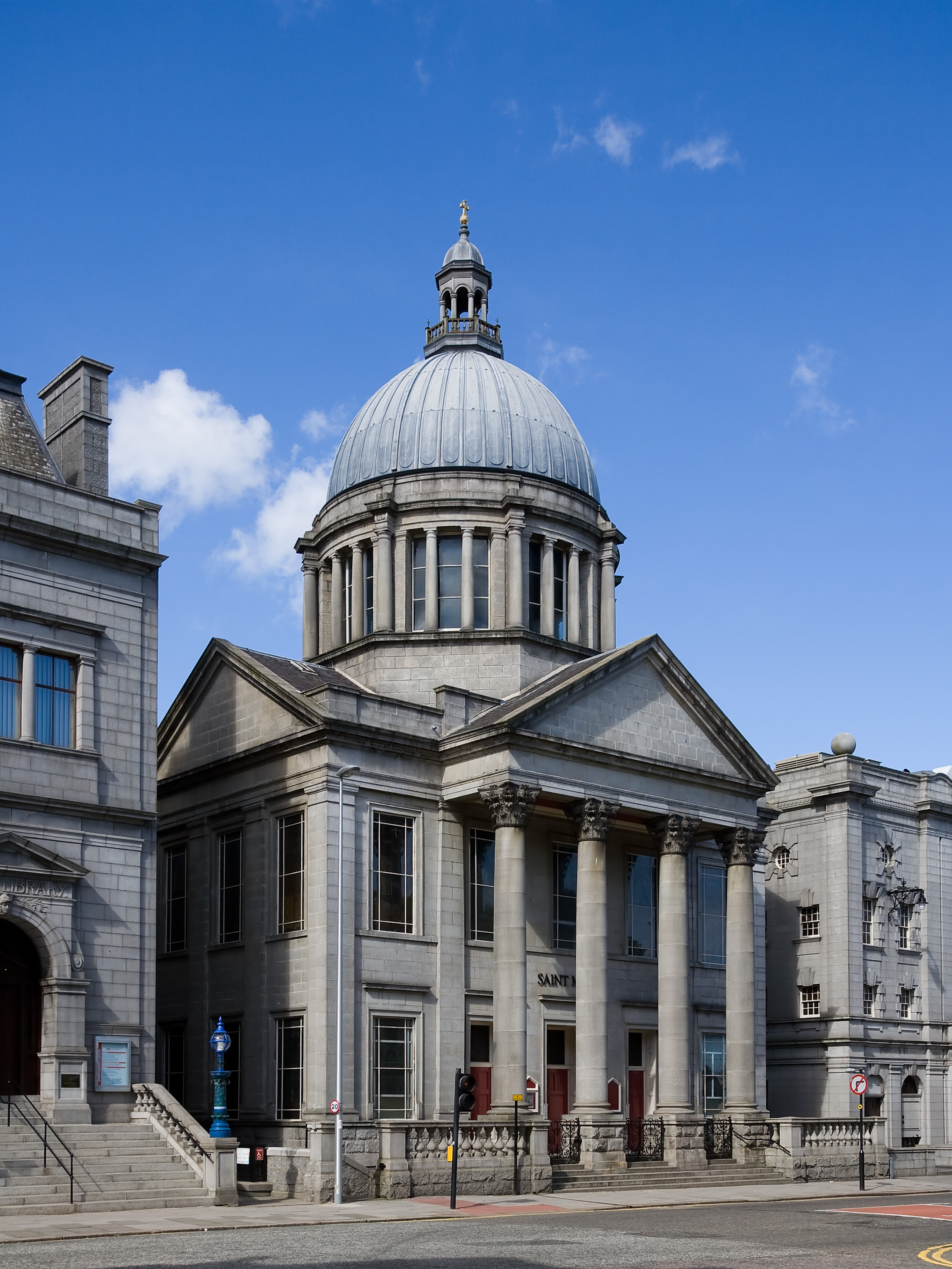
Saint Mark's Church

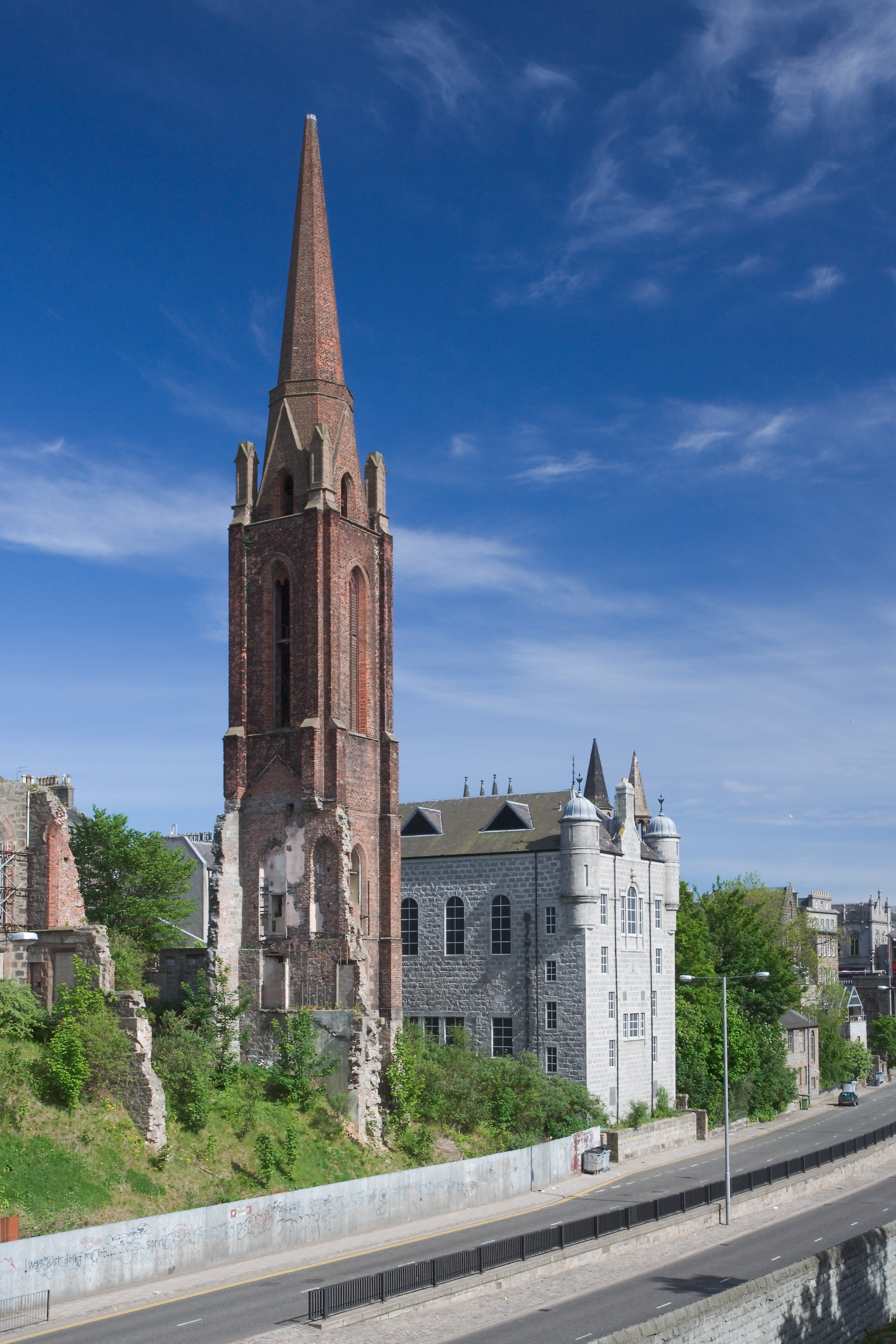
Triple Kirks, abandoned

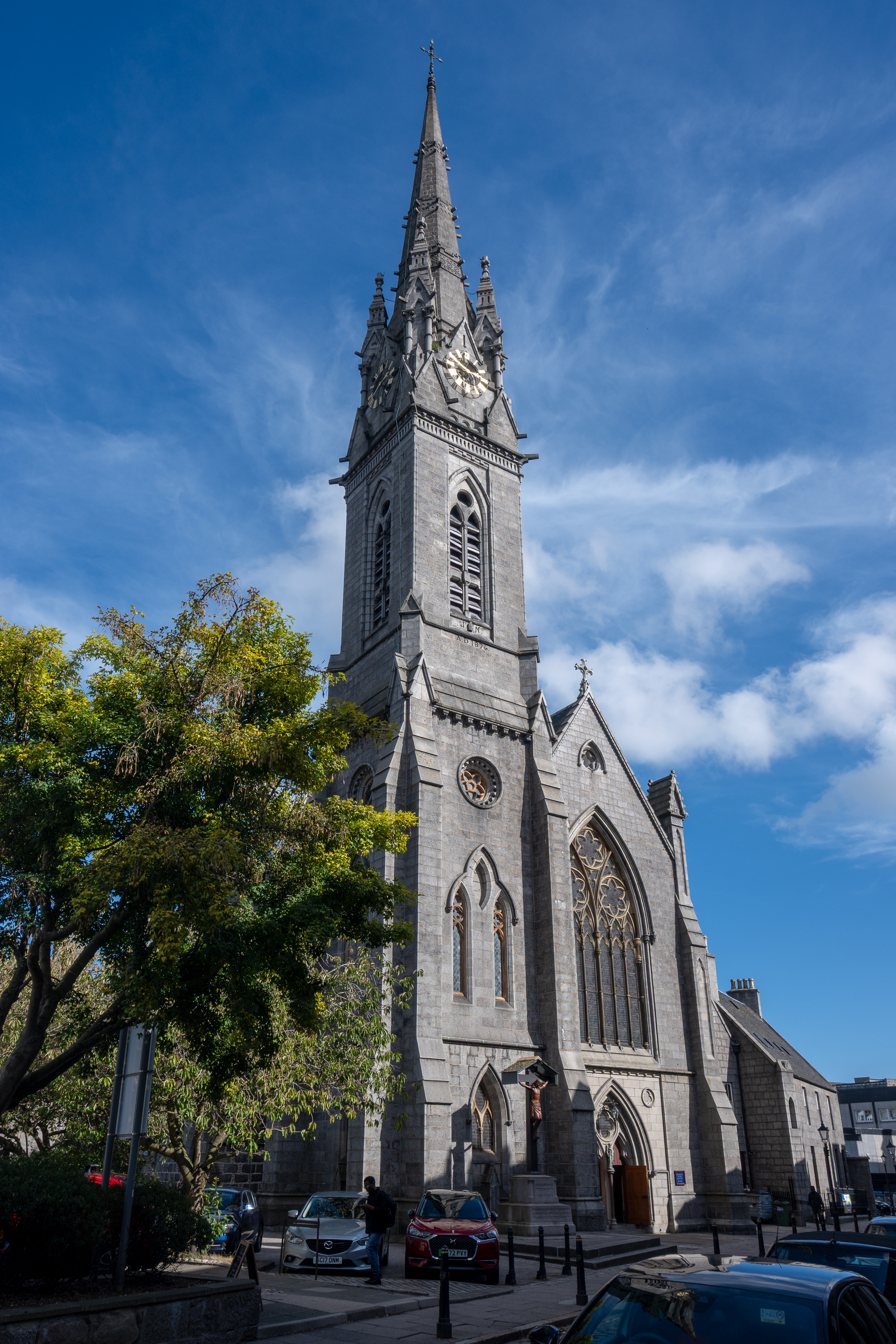
St Mary's Cathedral

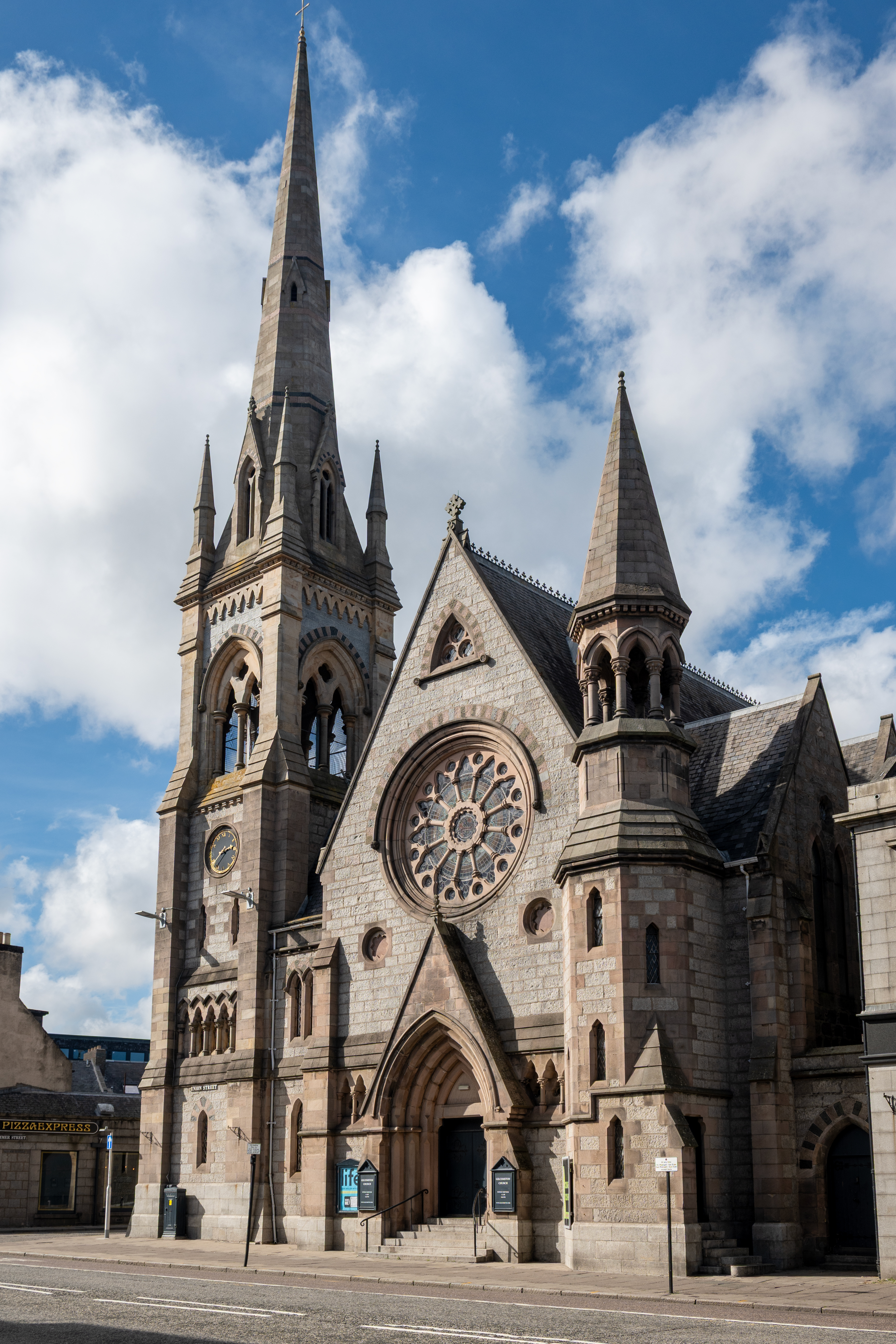
Gilcomston Church
