= Tron Church =

Tron Church may refer to:

- The Tron Church, Glasgow
- Tron Kirk, a former Church of Scotland church in Edinburgh, Scotland
- St George's Tron Church, a Church of Scotland church in Glasgow, Scotland
- Tron Theatre, whose building was the home of a 17th-century Tron Church in Glasgow, Scotland
- The Tron Church at Kelvingrove, an evangelical Presbyterian church in Glasgow, Scotland
