= Aberdeen Mosque and Islamic Centre =

Mosque in Aberdeen, Scotland, United Kingdom

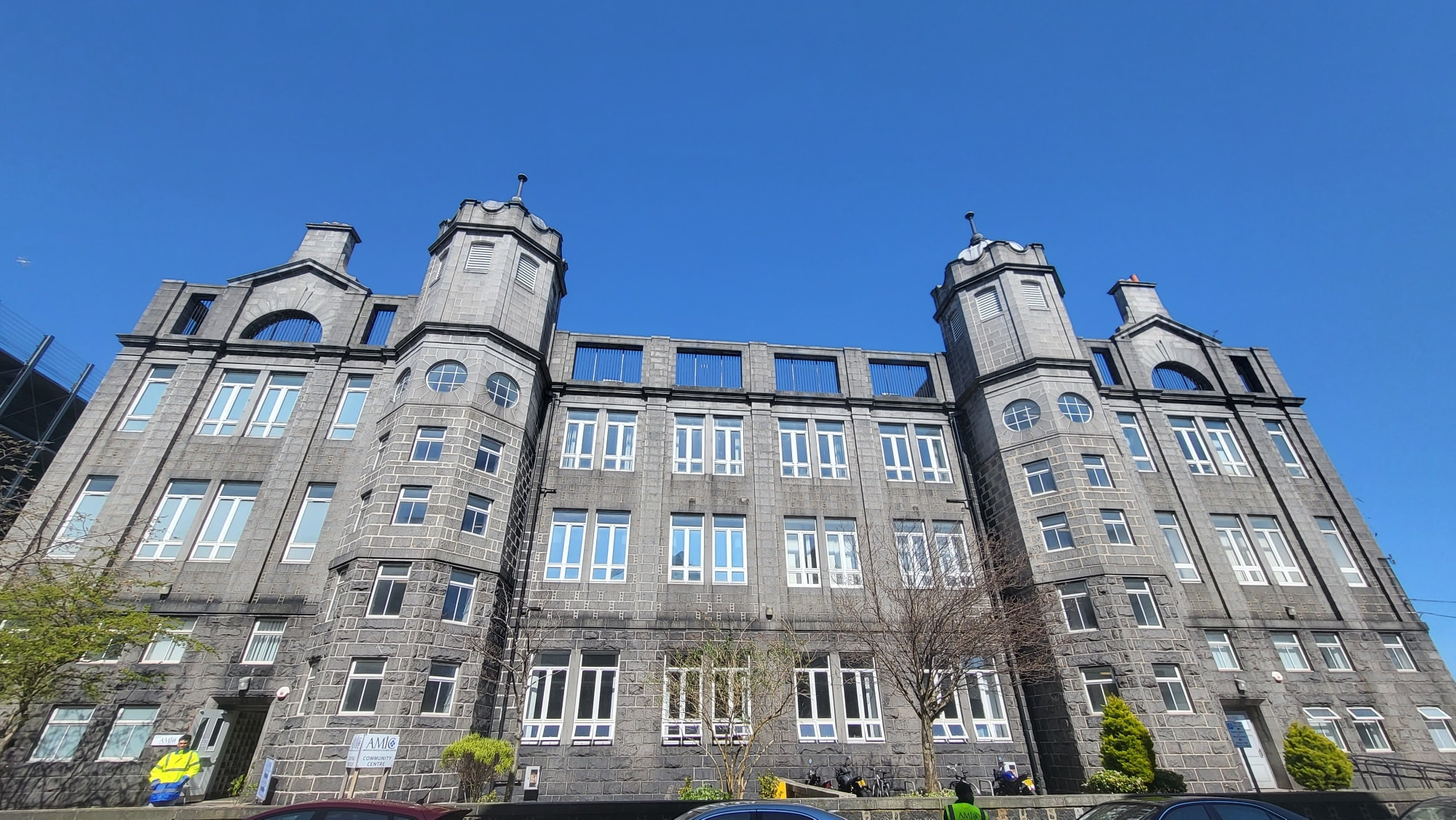

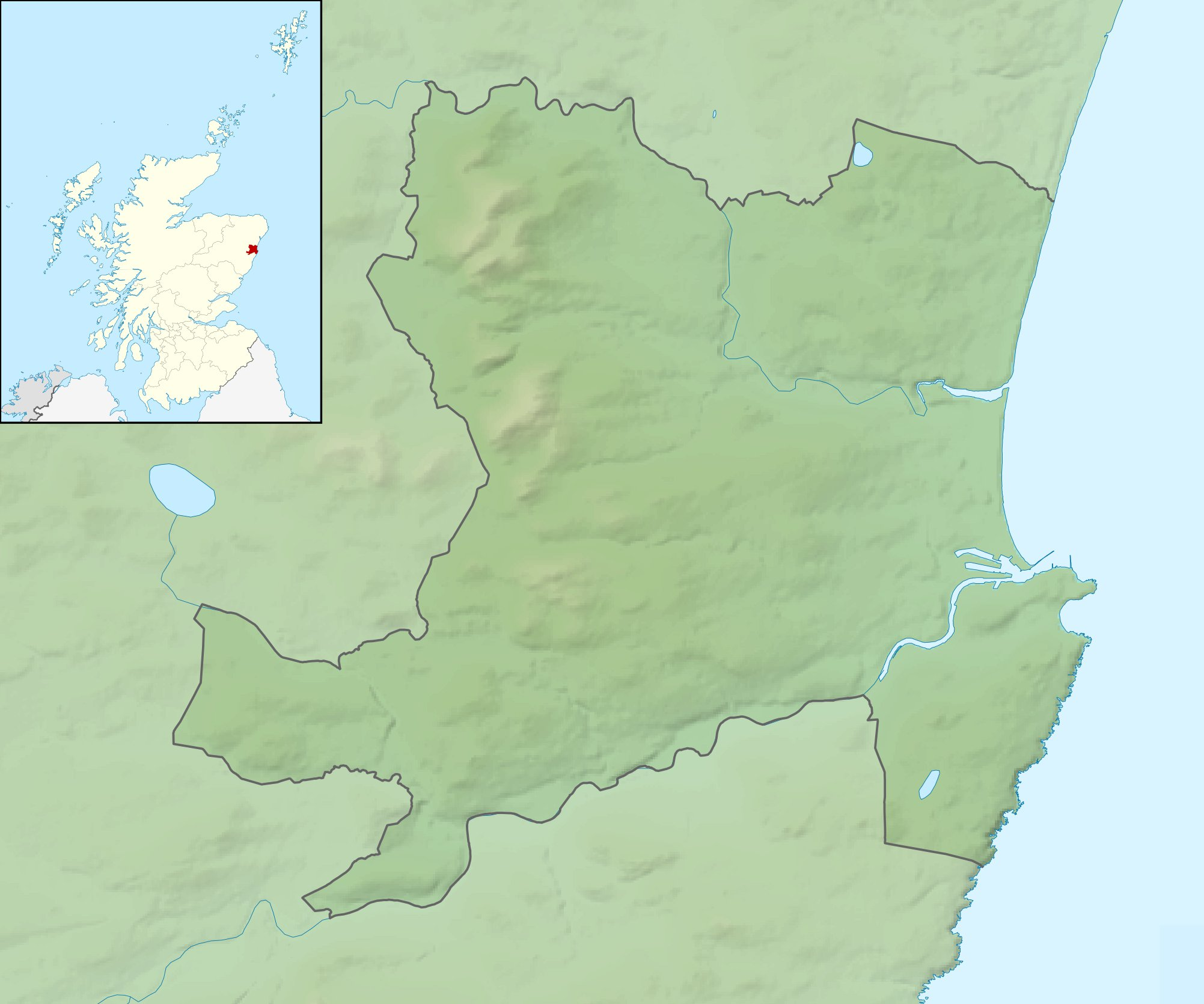
- Location of the mosque in Aberdeen

Religion
- Affiliation: Sunni Islam
- Ecclesiastical or organizational status: Mosque
- Status: Active

Location
- Location: Aberdeen, Scotland
- Country: United Kingdom
- Interactive map of Aberdeen Mosque and Islamic Centre
- Coordinates: 57°09′39.2″N 2°06′02.6″W

Architecture
- Type: House
- Established: October 1978; 47 years ago (as a community)
- Completed: 1905 (as a house)

Website
- aberdeenmosque.org

The Aberdeen Mosque and Islamic Centre (AMIC) is a Sunni mosque, located in Aberdeen, Scotland, in the United Kingdom. It is the largest mosque and Islamic centre in the North East of Scotland, and operates two sites within Aberdeen. The Aberdeen Central Mosque site is located on Frederick Street, and another older mosque operating for locals and students is located on Spital near the University of Aberdeen.

== Purpose ==
Registered as a charitable, non-profitable, non-political organisation, the purpose of AMIC is to hold congregational prayers and Islamic religious activities, with provision of free religious services to members of the Muslim community relating to Islamic marriage, birth, death and burial in accordance with Scottish law. AMIC also aims to promote unity and provide channels for better communication and understanding between the Muslims and non Muslims in the area. The mosque contributes to the local community by promoting and participating in projects related to areas of social concern.

Occasionally, AMIC, as well as other mosques in Aberdeen, host various types of open days to accommodate and provide some insight for the wider community.

== History ==
The mosque was founded by a small number of University of Aberdeen students and some local business people in October 1978. Initially the mosque was located in a small house beside the university. As the Muslim community grew bigger, several neighbouring houses were purchased to accommodate the growing number of worshippers.

In March 2022, the mosque moved to a larger site on Frederick Street which serves as the Central Mosque for the Muslim Community of Aberdeen and its surrounding area. The site on the Spital is open and primarily used by students and nearby residents.

== Education ==
AMIC currently operates several schools during weekdays, Fridays and the weekend, that cater for a range of individuals. These include AMIC Madrasah, Al-Noor Islamic School, privately run classes for iGCSE Islamic Studies, and a Friday evening school for girls which runs alongside its counterpart for boys in Masjid Alhikmah.

== See also ==
- Islam in Scotland
- List of mosques in the United Kingdom
- Religion in Aberdeen
