= The Tron Church, Glasgow =

Church in Glasgow, Scotland

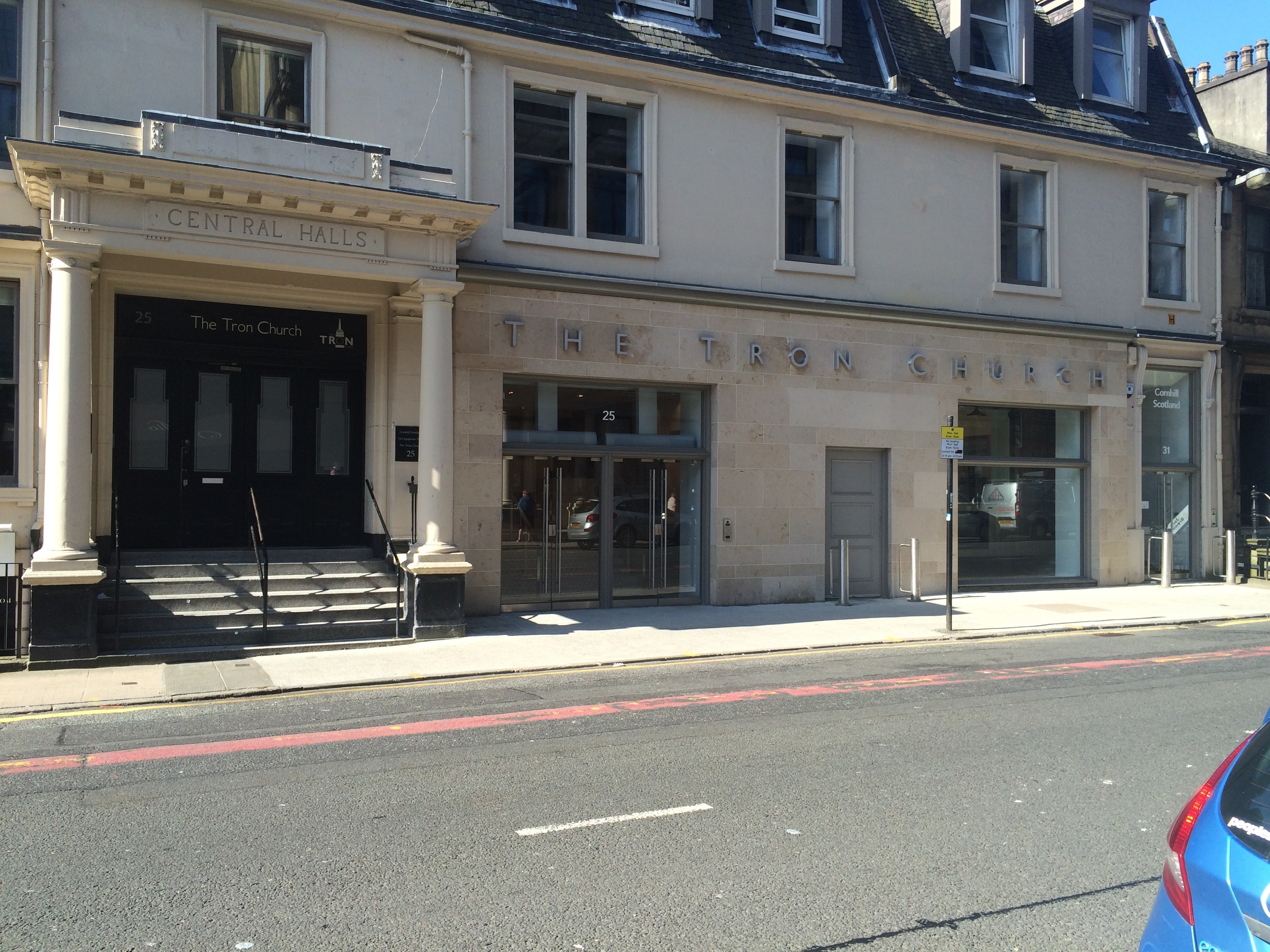
'Tron Central' at 25 Bath Street.

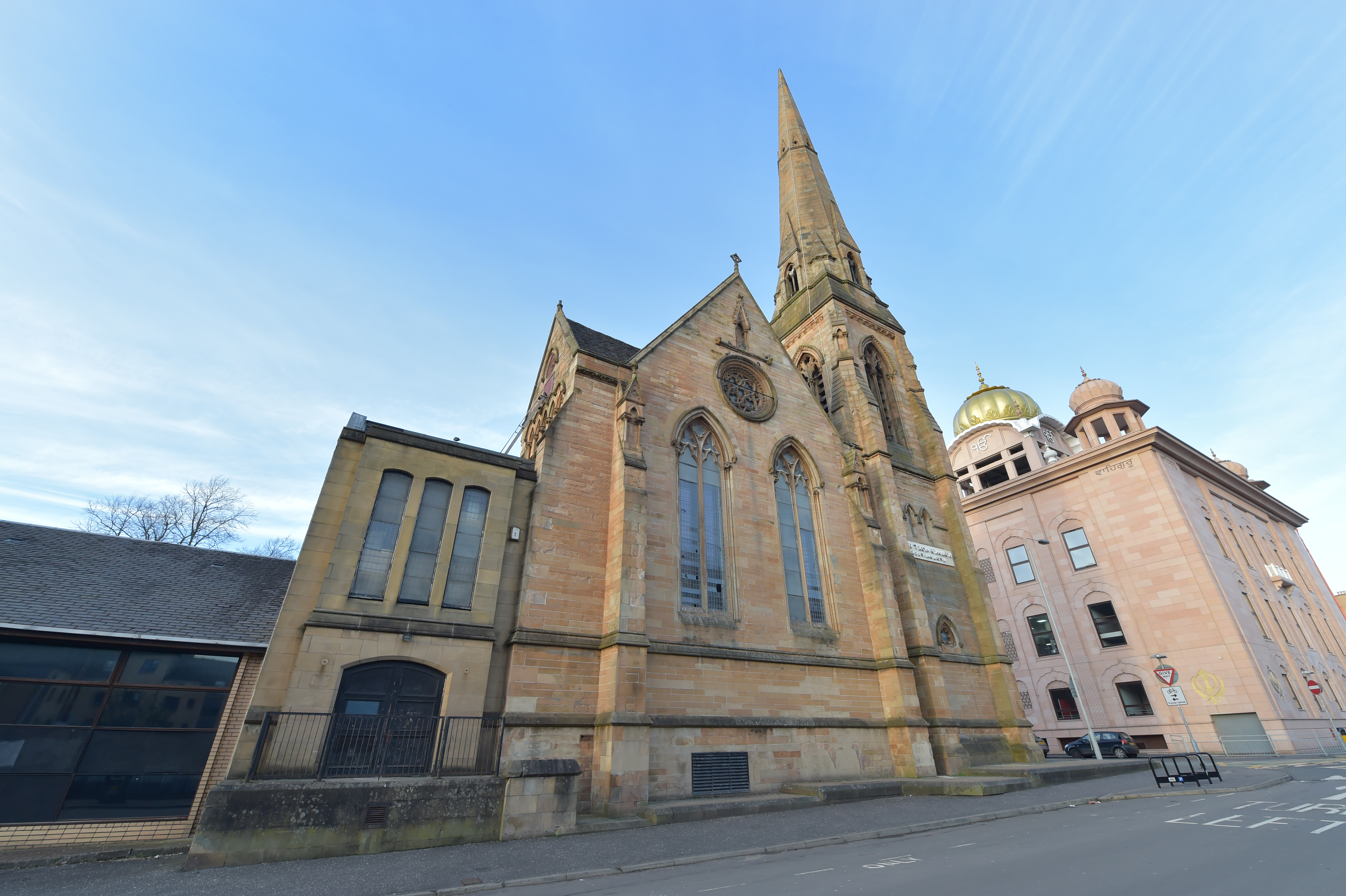
'Tron Kelvingrove' at 73 Claremont Street.

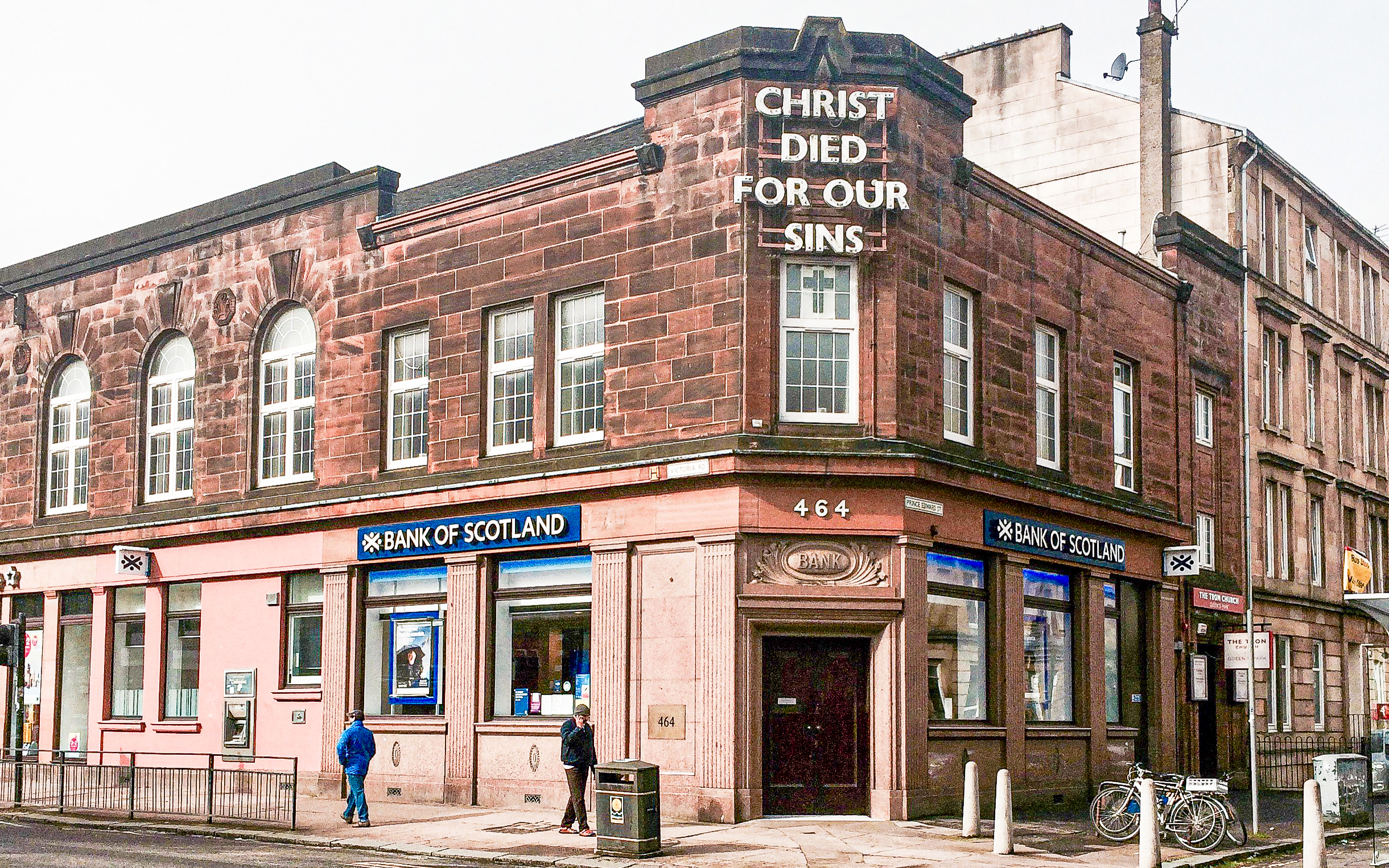
'Tron Queen's Park' at 5 Prince Edward Street

The Tron Church is an evangelical Presbyterian church which meets in three locations across Glasgow—in the city centre on Bath Street, in the Kelvingrove area of the West end of Glasgow, and on the Southside of Glasgow near Queen's Park.

'The Tron' has a strong heritage of expositional preaching which has been carried on through the ministries of Tom Allan (1955–1964), George Duncan (1964–1977), Eric Alexander (1977–1997), Sinclair Ferguson (1997–2004), and William Philip (2004–present).

Today, The Tron Church is a part of the Didasko presbytery, a small fellowship made up of seven churches across Scotland: Cornerstone Community Church, Stirling; Edinburgh North Church; Gilcomston Church, Aberdeen; Grace Church, Dundee; Maxwell Church, Kilmaurs; The Tron Church, Glasgow; and Trinity Church, Glasgow.

== History ==
=== 1687-1940: The 'Wynd' and 'The Tron' ===
The name of the church harks back to the original location of the congregation in the Trongate area of the city. A 'tron' was a device used for weighing and measuring often found in marketplaces in medieval Scotland. Without a true and trustworthy tron, transactions in marketplaces could not function fairly. The name of the church therefore calls to mind the need for unchanging truth in order for society to function and thrive.

The church in the Trongate was originally called the Wynd Church; it took its name from the streets it was situated between, New Wynd and Back Wynd, and was formed in 1687. Its founding members were determined to maintain a faithful biblical witness against great pressure to conform to the pro-episcopal establishment.

=== 1808-2012: St George's & St George's-Tron ===
In 1808, a new church building was built on Buchanan Street which became the meeting place for the congregation of the Wynd Church under the name of St George's Parish Church. In 1940, the congregation then merged with the congregation of Tron St Anne's and then became known as St George's Tron. ‘The Tron’, as the name of the church has commonly been known in the city of Glasgow for many decades now and is still in use today.

=== Recent history ===
The congregation remained in the building on Buchanan Street until December 2012, when they moved again to the nearby premises on Bath Street due to disagreements with the Church of Scotland and their position on the authority of the Bible - an issue which came to a head over the particular issue of the ordination of Ministers in same-sex relationships. Virtually all of the membership left the Church of Scotland, and continued to meet in the current building on Bath Street. 'The Tron' was one of several congregations to leave the Church of Scotland at this time. The Church of Scotland retains ownership of the Buchanan St building, which has since gained a new congregation.

Following this move, the congregation of 'The Tron' church now meet in three different buildings in Glasgow, being on Claremont St, Prince Edward St, and Bath St. They also host a Farsi service each month, with the other english services being translated via an app.
