= Islam in Scotland =

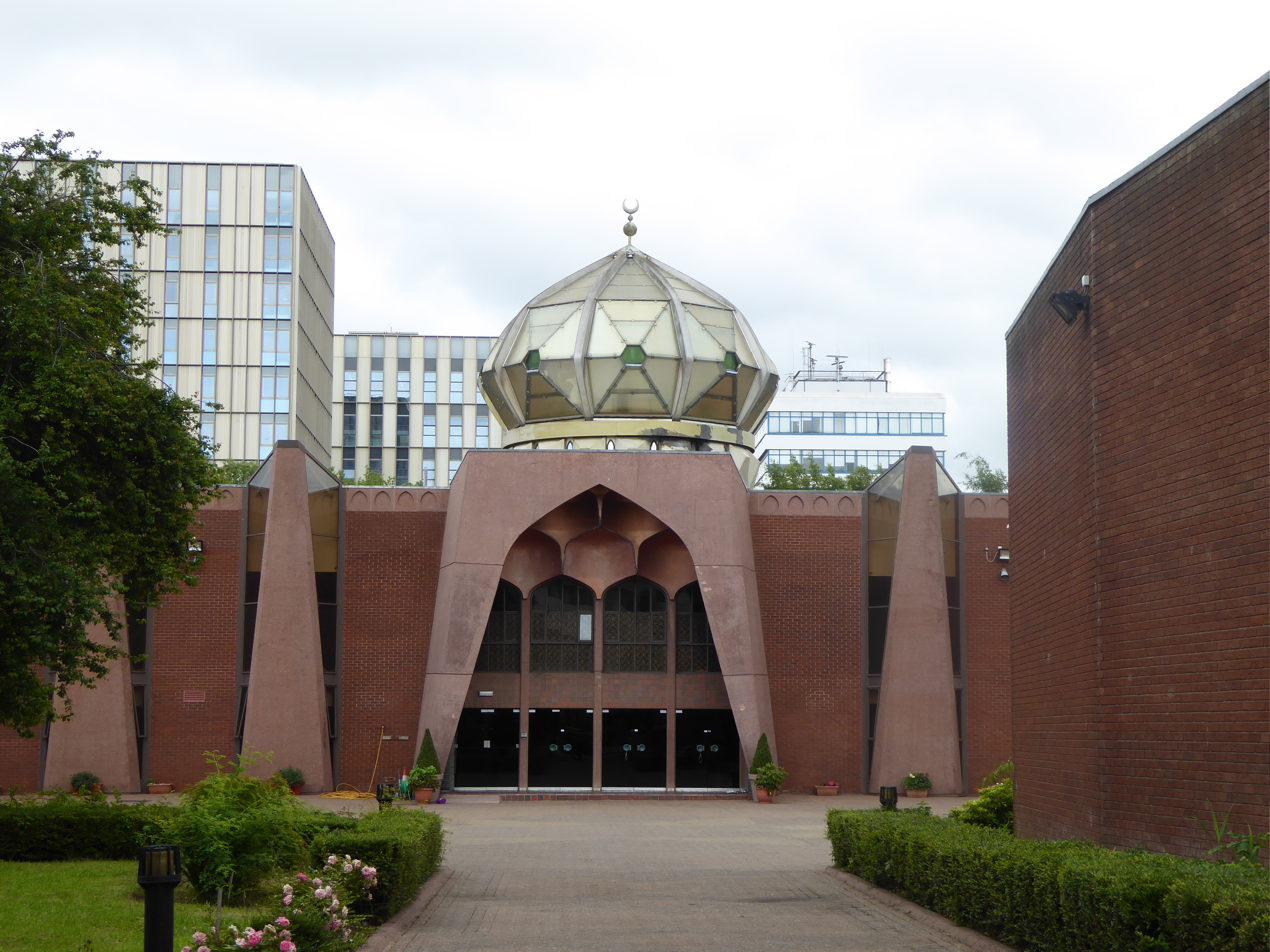
- The Glasgow Central Mosque is the largest Sunni mosque in Glasgow

Total population
- 119,872 – 2.2% (2022 Census)

Regions with significant populations
- Glasgow City: 48,766 – 7.9%
- City of Edinburgh: 18,034 – 3.5%
- Aberdeen City: 6,465 – 2.9%
- Dundee City: 6,232 – 4.2%

Religions
- Majority Sunni Islam

Muslim Population History in Scotland
Year	Pop.	±%
2001	42,557	—
2011	76,737	+80.3%
2022	119,872	+56.2%
Source: Office for National Statistics and National Records of Scotland

In the 2022 census, Muslims comprised 2.2 per cent (119,872) of Scotland's population.

The first Muslim known to have been in Scotland was a medical student who studied at the University of Edinburgh from 1858 to 1859. The production of goods and Glasgow's busy port meant that many lascars were employed there. Most Muslims in Scotland are members of families that immigrated in the later decades of the 20th century.

== History ==
The first named Muslim known in Scotland was Wazir Beg from Bombay (now "Mumbai"). He is recorded as being a medical student who studied at the University of Edinburgh in 1858 and 1859. Manufacturing and Glasgow's busy seaport meant that many Lascars were employed there. Dundee was at the peak of importing jute, and sailors from Bengal were also seen at its port. Records from the Glasgow Sailors' Home show that nearly a third (5,500) of the boarders in 1903 were Muslim Lascars.

However, the immigration of Muslims to Scotland is a relatively recent event. The majority of Scottish Muslims are members of families who immigrated in the late 20th century. Scotland's Muslims in 2001 represented just 0.9% of the population (42,557), with 30,000 in Glasgow. By 2011, the Muslim population had increased to 76,737, accounting for 1.4% of Scotland's population. In 2022 census, it was 2.2%.

== Demographics ==
Muslims in Scotland are an ethnically diverse population. Although a majority of Muslims are of Pakistani (52%) origin, 14.5% are Arab, 4.6% are White and 8?.% are African. Glasgow has the highest Muslim population of any city in Scotland with 7.9% of residents identifying as Muslim in the 2022 census. Pollokshields and Southside Central are the wards with the highest concentration of Muslim residents – 27.8% and 15.7% respectively. 37.3% of Muslim in Scotland were born in Scotland, with another 7.3% born elsewhere in the United Kingdom. Edinburgh is home to the second highest population of Muslims in Scotland. Taken together, Glasgow and Edinburgh are home to around 60% of all Muslims in Scotland.

=== Ethnicity ===
The table shows the Muslim populations among ethnic groups and nationalities in Scotland.

Muslims by Ethnic group
Ethnic group	2022	
Ethnic group	Number	% of Muslim population
– Scottish	2,051	1.71
– British	489	0.41
– Irish	45	0.04
– Polish	128	0.11
– Gypsy and Irish Traveller	31	0.03
– Roma	42	0.04
– Other White	2,721	2.27
– Mixed	4,293	3.58
– Indian	3,197	2.67
– Pakistani	61,743	51.51
– Bangladeshi	5,611	4.68
– Chinese	130	0.11
– Other Asian	6,021	5.02
– African	10,512	8.77
– Caribbean	53	0.04
– Other Black	220	0.18
– Arab	17,358	14.48
– Other Ethnic group	5,213	4.35
TOTAL	119,872	–

== Identity ==
According to information from the 2011 Scottish census, 71% of Muslims in Scotland consider their only national identity to be Scottish or British (or any combination of UK identities). The census concluded "Muslims have a strong sense of belonging to Scotland in particular and the UK more generally."

== Education and employment ==
In 2011, 37.5% of Scottish Muslims held degree level qualifications compared to the Scotland average of 27.1%. 21.4% of Muslims in Scotland had no qualifications, slightly lower than the 22.9% average for Scotland. Only 4.5% of Muslims in Scotland had poor English language skills.

Muslims in Scotland in 2011 were less likely to be employed full-time (31%) than the general population (51%). Contributing factors for this include Muslims being more likely to be students (19%) than the general population (6%), and 25% of Muslim women 'looking after the home or family', in comparison to 5.6% of women from the overall population. 8.7% of Scottish Muslims were unemployed, whereas 6.3% of the general population were unemployed. Approximately a third of Scottish Muslims working full-time are self-employed, compared with 12% of the general population.

== Mosques ==
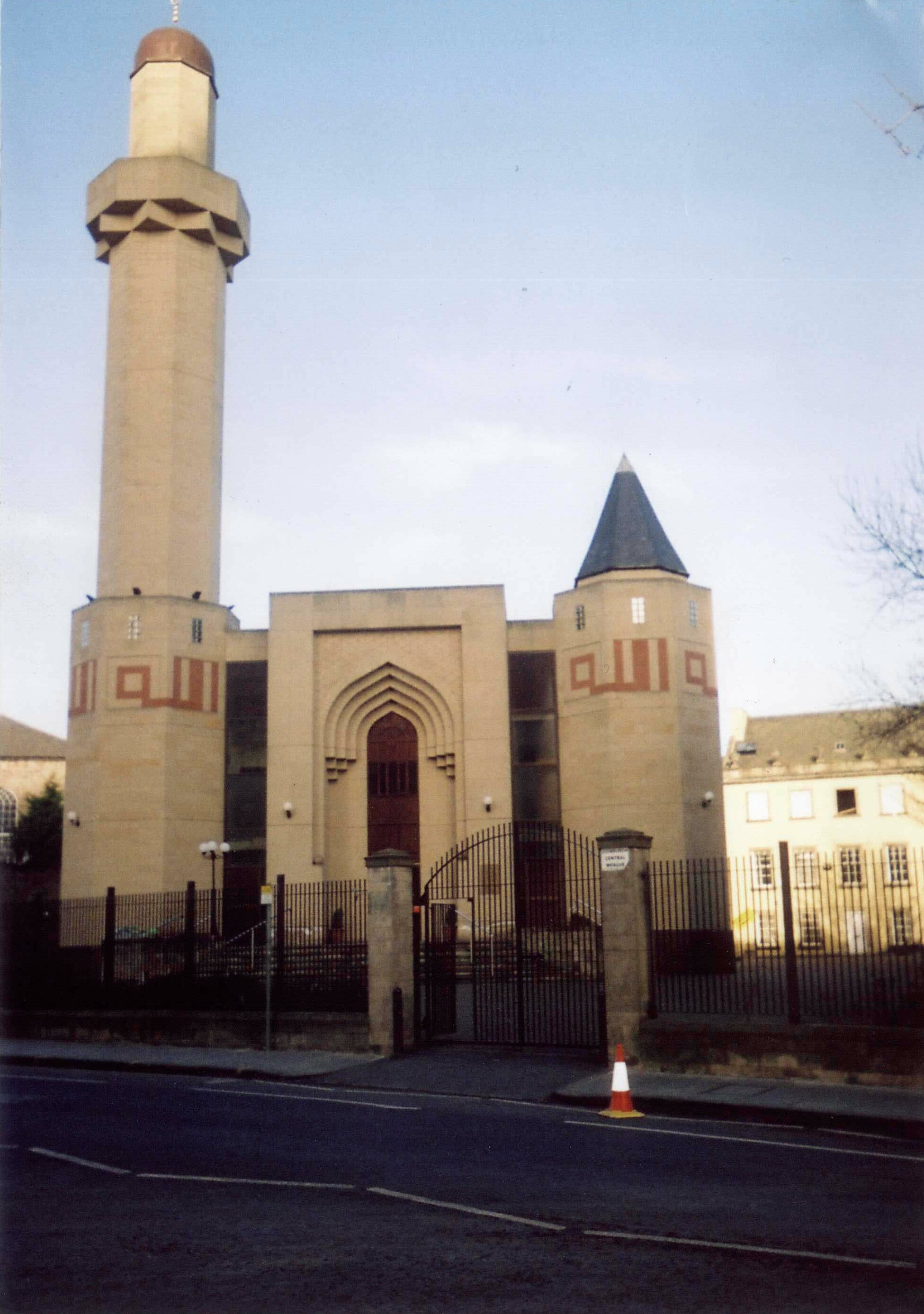
Edinburgh Central Mosque

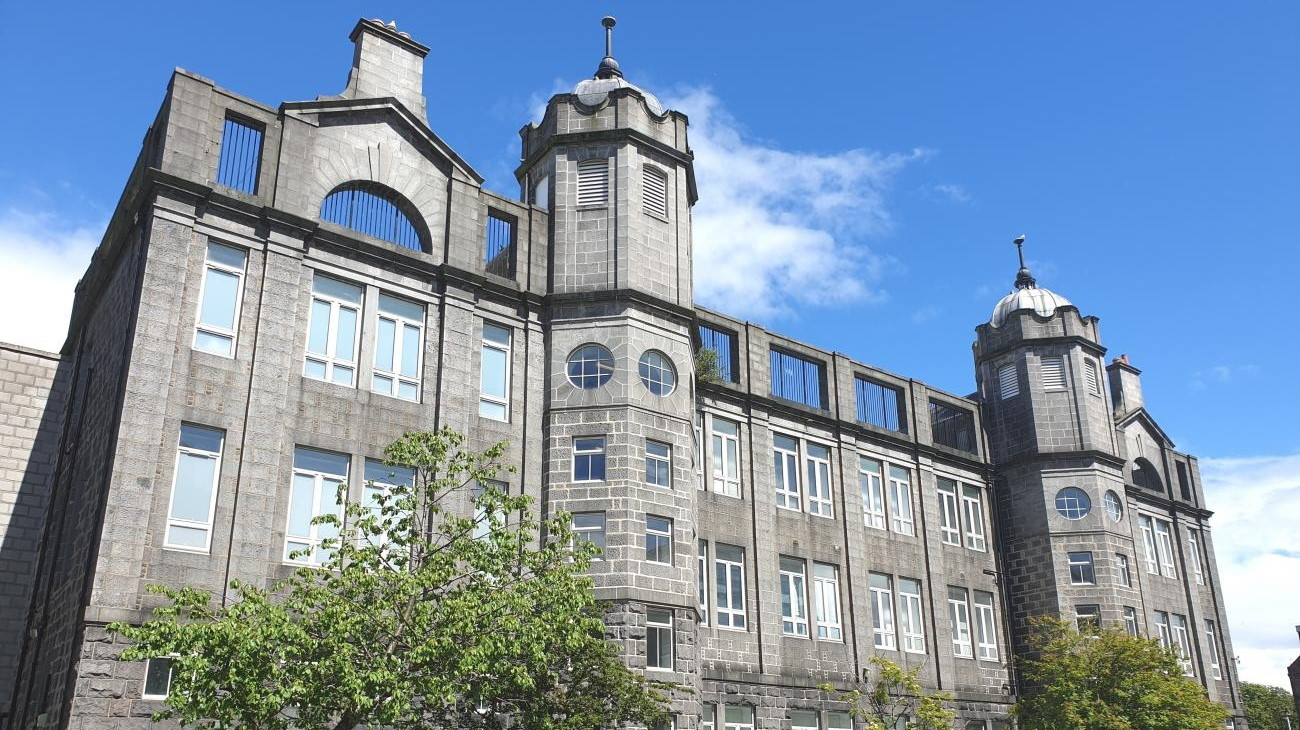
Aberdeen Mosque and Islamic Centre

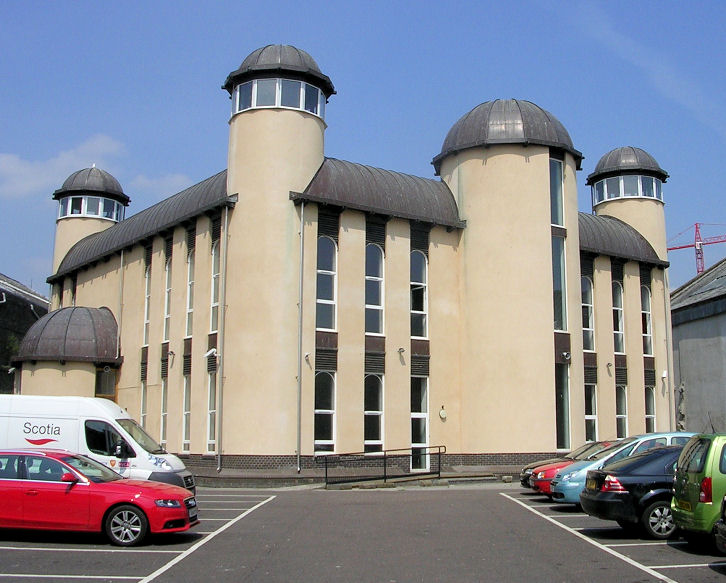
Dundee Central Mosque

Some important mosques in the major cities of Scotland are Glasgow Central Mosque, Edinburgh Central Mosque, Aberdeen Mosque and Islamic Centre, and Dundee Central Mosque.

== Notable Scottish Muslims ==
- Aamer Anwar - Leading Lawyer & Campaigner
- Ali Abbasi - Gaelic television presenter.
- Bashir Ahmad - First Asian Member of the Scottish Parliament (2007–09)
- Lady Evelyn Cobbold – diarist, traveller and noblewoman
- Tasmina Ahmed-Sheikh - Politician who served as a Member of Parliament (MP) for Ochil and South Perthshire, 2015-2017, Scottish National Party Trade and Investment spokesperson, Deputy Shadow Leader of the House in the House of Commons, and the SNP's National Women's and Equalities Convener.
- Abdal-Qadir As-Sufi (Ian Dallas) - Shaykh of Instruction, leader of the Darqawi-Shadhili-Qadiri Tariqa and founder of the Murabitun World Movement
- Bashir Mann - Former Labour councillor
- Misbah Iram Ahmed Rana (Molly Campbell) - Mixed Scottish-Pakistani heritage involved in publicised parental custody issues
- Humza Yousaf MSP - First Asian to become First Minister of Scotland
- Anas Sarwar MSP - Leader of the Scottish Labour Party
- Mohammad Sarwar MP - First Muslim MP at Westminster from 1997 to 2010. His son Anas Sarwar held the same seat from 2010 to 2015 and has been an MSP since 2016.
- Mona Siddiqui - British Muslim academic, currently is a University of Edinburgh's Professor of Islam and Interreligious studies, as well a regular contributor to BBC Radio 4, The Times, Scotsman, The Guardian, The Herald
- Kaukab Stewart - The first female of Pakistani descent to be elected as a Member of the Scottish Parliament (MSP) in 2021
- Viscount Reidhaven - Eldest son of the Earl of Seafield.
- Osama Saeed - Chief executive of the Scottish-Islamic Foundation & Former Head of Al-Jazeera Global PR & Marketing
- Mushtaq Ahmad - Lord lieutenant of Lanarkshire.
- Zara Mohammed - First female and youngest ever Secretary-General of the Muslim Council of Britain
- Sohaib Saeed - Islamic scholar, academic and imam

== See also ==
- Islam by country
- Islam in the United Kingdom
- Muslim Council of Scotland
- The Muslim Weekly
- Scottish Muslims
- Demographics of Scotland
- British Asian
- Asian-Scots
- New Scot
