= Murder of Asad Shah =

2016 murder case in Scotland

The murder of Asad Shah was the religiously motivated murder of an Ahmadiyya Muslim shopkeeper, in the Scottish city of Glasgow on 24 March 2016. The murderer, a Sunni Muslim, Tanveer Ahmed, had driven from the English city of Bradford with the intent of confronting Shah about his claim to be a prophet. Shah had allegedly issued YouTube videos in which he claimed the status of a prophet. Mainstream Islam's belief being that Muhammad is considered as the last prophet, Ahmed regarded Shah's claims to be blasphemous. Some Muslims and mosques in the UK praised his action. Ahmed was sentenced to life imprisonment with a minimum term of 27 years.

== Murder ==
Ahmed reached Glasgow on 24 March 2016 and confronted Shah as he served behind the counter in his shop in Shawlands. He demanded that Shah must retract his views. Shah declined to do so and offered to shake Ahmed's hand as a gesture of goodwill. Ahmed responded by drawing a knife and stabbing Shah repeatedly. Shah attempted to escape by running outside his shop, but Ahmed continued the attack despite the intervention of Shah's brother Athar. After Shah collapsed from his wounds, Ahmed stomped repeatedly on his head and face. He then walked a short distance to a bus shelter and waited for the police. When they arrived and approached him, he reportedly told them: "I respect what you do and I have nothing against you and so I am not going to hurt you. I have broken the law and appreciate how you are treating me."

=== Motives for the murder ===
Following his arrest and remand to prison, Ahmed issued a statement through his lawyer explaining his motives for the murder: "This all happened for one reason and no other issues and no other intentions. Asad Shah disrespected the messenger of Islam the Prophet Muhammad, peace be upon him. Mr Shah claimed to be a Prophet." Ahmed was an admirer of Mumtaz Qadri, a Pakistani Sunni who assassinated the Punjab Governor Salmaan Taseer after Taseer suggested a relaxation in Pakistan's strict blasphemy laws. Like Qadri, who was hanged for the assassination, Ahmed belongs to a religious group called Dawat-e-Islami, which is dedicated to defending the honour of Muhammad. The organisation released a statement in which they did not condone Ahmed's crime.

=== Reaction to murder ===
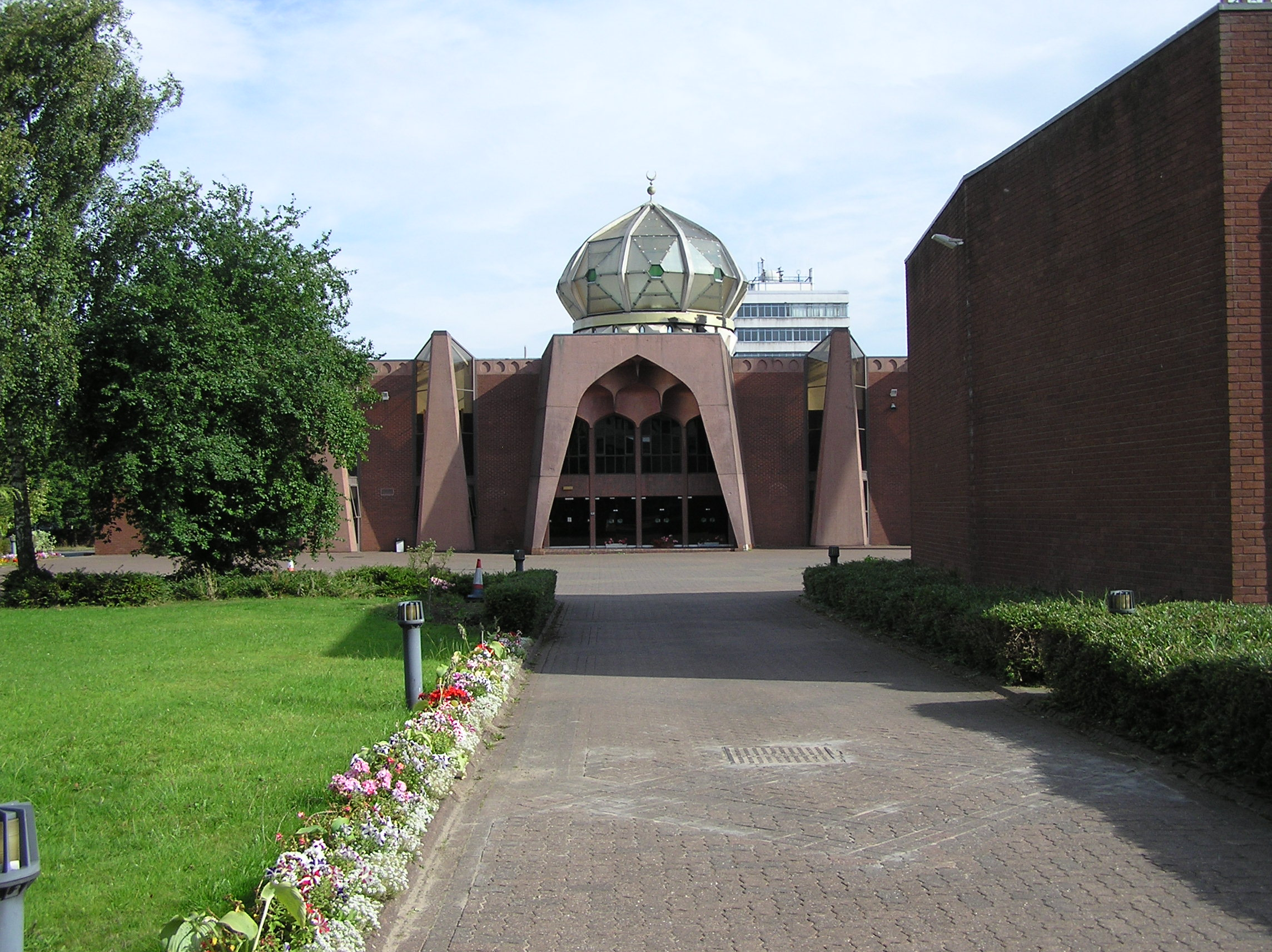
Representatives of Glasgow Central Mosque rejected an invitation to a vigil in Shah's memory.

The First Minister of Scotland, Nicola Sturgeon, attended a vigil for Shah, together with 500 other people. The Ahmadiyya community issued a statement about the murder that read: "In any society, all members of the public have a right to safety and it is up to the Government and police to protect members of the public as best they can. In this context it is up to the Government to root out all forms of extremism and the Ahmadiyya Muslim Community has been speaking about the importance of this for many years." The Ahmadiyya community then conducted an anti-extremism campaign in Scotland. Representatives from the Sikh, Jewish and Christian communities attended the launch of the campaign and invitations were extended to the Glasgow Central Mosque and the Muslim Council of Scotland. The Guardian reported that both the Mosque and the Council declined the invitations "at the last minute" with apologies.

=== Victim ===
Asad Shah was 40 and was born in Rabwah, Pakistan. He moved to Scotland from Pakistan in 1998 and was granted asylum. He was a shopkeeper in Shawlands, Glasgow.

=== Murderer ===
Tanveer Ahmed is a Sunni Muslim who was working as an Uber minicab driver and lived in Bradford, and like Shah had migrated to Britain from Pakistan. He was aged 32 at the time of his conviction. On 7 July 2016, he admitted murder. On 9 August 2016, he was sentenced to life imprisonment with a minimum of 27 years in the High Court in Glasgow by Judge Lady Rae. The judge said Shah was regarded by those who knew him as a "peaceful and peace-loving man and family man who went out of his way to show respect for those of any faith." She said his murder was an "appalling display of merciless violence" and told Ahmed that he was responsible for the "barbaric, premeditated and wholly unjustified killing of a much loved man who was a pillar of the local community."

On hearing his sentence, the killer shouted: "Muhammad is the prophet, he is the only one." His supporters in the public gallery chanted back to show their solidarity.

== Review of legislation ==
Lord Advocate James Wolffe formally recommended a review of legal standards governing crimes aggravated by religious prejudice as a result of this murder.
