= Bon Accord Free Church =

Coordinates: 57°8′55″N 2°6′32″W

- Bon Accord Free Church
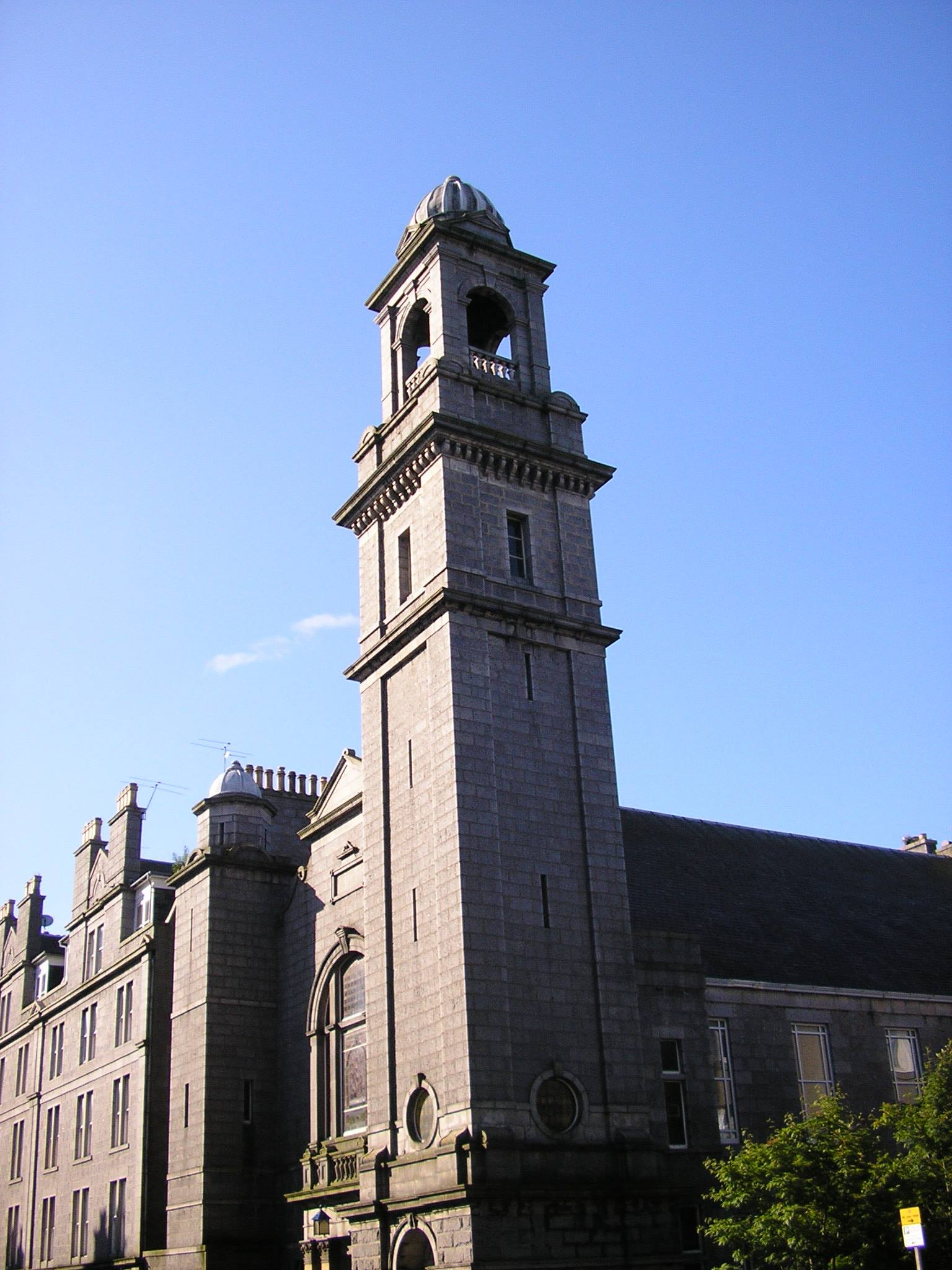
- Bon Accord Free Church
- Location: Aberdeen
- Country: Scotland
- Denomination: Free Church of Scotland
- Churchmanship: Evangelical
- Website: www.bafreechurch.org.uk

History
- Former name: St. Columba Free Church
- Founded: 1845

Architecture
- Functional status: Active
- Style: Granite

Specifications
- Capacity: 700
- Materials: Granite

Administration
- Parish: Aberdeen
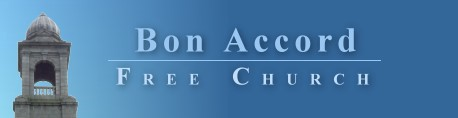

Bon Accord Free Church is a congregation of the Free Church of Scotland in Aberdeen.

== History ==
Bon-Accord Free Church was formed in 1828 via the secession of members of the congregation of Trinity Chapel, who purchased the Union Terrace church from a Baptist congregation. In 1834, it became a quoad sacra parish, and gained members as a result of secessions from Gilcomston Church. Minister Gavin Parker led the congregation through the Disruption. The congregation underwent a series of reaffiliations, becoming a United Free church, then Bon-Accord Church of Scotland in 1929 when the United Free church reunited with the Church of Scotland, before its most recent affiliation as Bon Accord Free Church in 1974.

In September 2025, the church congregation sent out Rev. Ben Traynor to be a church planter in the Garioch area of Aberdeenshire, centred around Inverurie to be Gairoch Free Church.

== Buildings ==
The current building was designed in 1894 by the architect Robert Gordon Wilson on the site of the Union Baptist Chapel and opened in 1896. Following the Union of 1900 it became the Bon Accord United Free Church. From 1962 to 1974 it was Bon Accord St Paul's Church before reverting to Bon Accord Free Church in 1974.

The congregation has been in the Bon Accord building ever since it was bought in 1977. Before this, they used a building on Dee Street until the building became too small for them during the 1970s. The present building on Rosemount Viaduct seats around 700 people.

The current building underwent significant renovations and repairs in 2016/ 2017 during this time the congregation moved out of the building and met in a local community centre. These included repairs to the roof and both domes as well as internal modifications. The foyer was increased in size to create a small café/ breakout space, the sanctuary was decreased in size as a result with the pews also being removed from the main floor of the sanctuary to be replaced with chairs. The balcony in the sanctuary retains the original pews. The church organ was removed given it had rarely been used since the building was purchased in 1974 and had fallen into disrepair though the organ pipes remain in place as a decorative feature above the pulpit.

== Ministers ==
Name	Years	Left to
Hector Cameron	1975–1982	Killearnan, Black Isle
Alex MacDonald	1983–1993	Buccleuch and Greyfriars, Edinburgh
Iver Martin	1997–2003	Stornoway, Isle of Lewis
David MacPherson	2008–2020	Operación San Andrés, Peru
Joe Hall	2021 -	
Donald Smith (assistant)	2023 -	
