= Hector Cameron (moderator) =

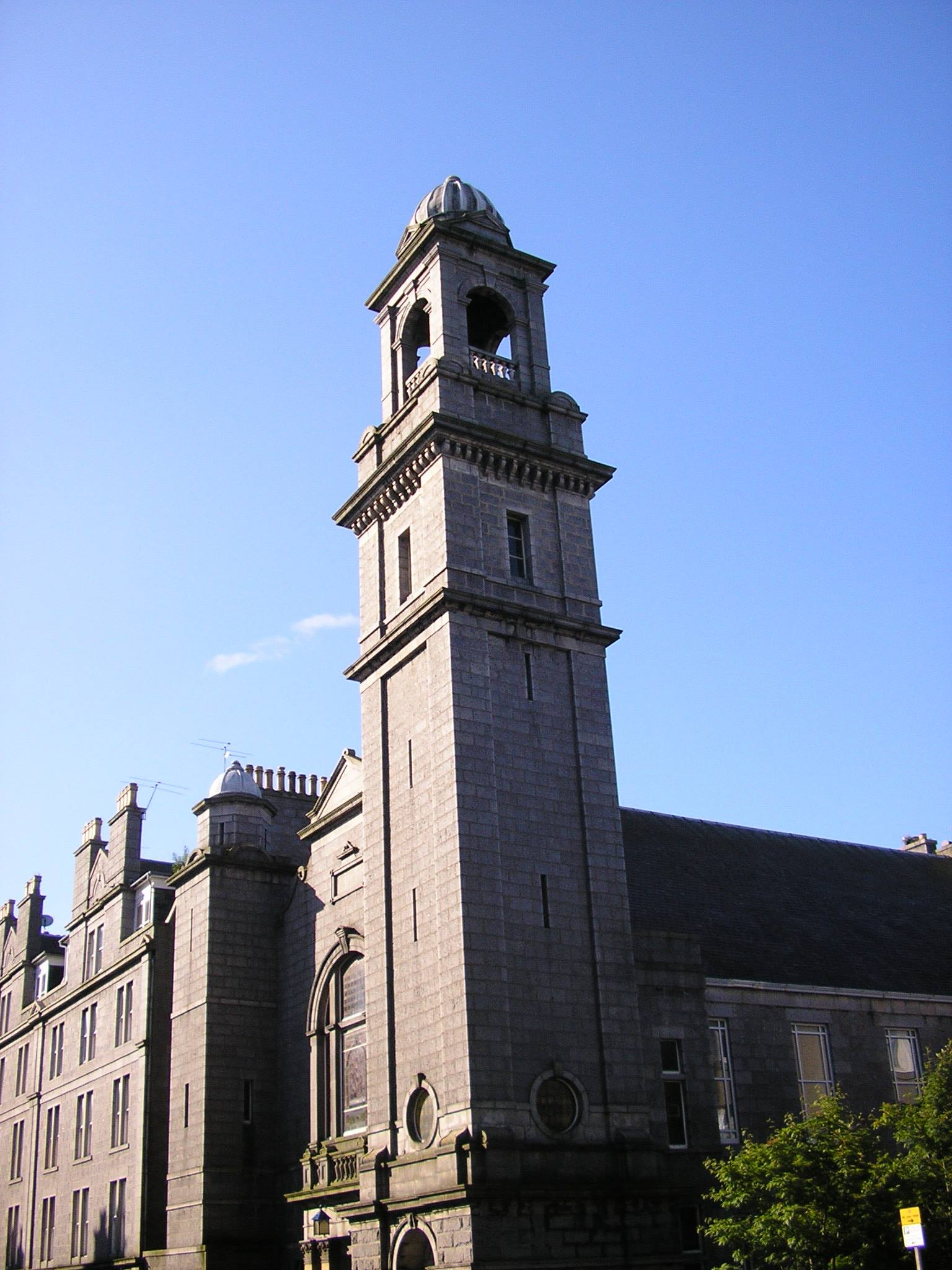
Bon Accord Free Church in Aberdeen

Hector Cameron (1924–1994) was a Free Church of Scotland minister who served as Moderator of the General Assembly in 1980.

== Life ==
He was born in Resolis in Ross-shire in 1924 the son of Rev William Cameron (1885-1950), descended from shepherds in the Lochaber district, and his wife, Elizabeth Mackintosh. His paternal grandfather was Rev Hector Cameron (1835-1915) of Lochs and Backs (who was a noted Gaelic poet). All three generations were ministers of the Free Church of Scotland.

His family had left the established Church of Scotland in the Disruption of 1843 to join the Free Church.

He served with the Signal Corps during the latter part of the Second World War. He then studied Divinity and was ordained as a minister of the Free Church in 1954. He initially served in a Free Church in London then obtained a post in Lybster in Caithness. He then spent time at both Wick and Dornoch before going to Aberdeen.

He was minister of Bon Accord Free Church in Aberdeen from 1975 to 1982. During this period, from 1980 to 1981, he served as Moderator of the General Assembly the highest position in his church.

In 1983 he moved to the more sedate joint parish of Killearnan and Fortrose on the Black Isle. in 1990 the parishes split into separate congregations.

He retired to Inverness in 1989 and died there in March 1994.

Following his death, 1200 of his books were donated to found the Hector Cameron Library in the Highland Theological College.

== Family ==
His wife Lois Anna Mackay died in Inverness in 2018 aged 91. They had two children: Martin and Jane.
