= Sinclair Ferguson =

Scottish theologian and academic

Sinclair B. Ferguson
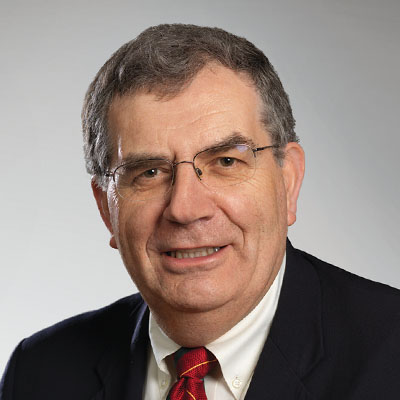
- Born: February 21, 1948 (age 78)
- Occupations: Systematic theology scholar; Presbyterian minister
- Spouse: Dorothy Ferguson

Academic background
- Education: University of Aberdeen (PhD)
- Thesis: The Doctrine of the Christian Life in the Teaching of Dr. John Owen (1661–1683) (1979)

Academic work
- Discipline: Systematic theology
- Institutions: Reformed Theological Seminary; Westminster Theological Seminary
- Notable works: The Holy Spirit (1997); The Whole Christ: Legalism, Antinomianism, and Gospel Assurance―Why the Marrow Controversy Still Matters (2016)

Sinclair Buchanan Ferguson (born 21 February 1948) is a Scottish Reformed systematic theology scholar. Known for his teaching, writing, and editorial work, he has been Chancellor's Professor of Systematic Theology at Reformed Theological Seminary since 2017, commuting from Scotland, where he was an assistant minister at St. Peter's Free Church of Scotland, Dundee. He is currently a preaching associate at Trinity Church, Aberdeen.

== Early Life ==
Ferguson was born on 21 February 1948 in Glasgow, the son of Robert Buchanan Ferguson and Emma Harriet Standish Sinclair Swanston Munro. He was educated at Alexandra Parade Primary and Whitehill Secondary (1953-1965) in the Dennistoun area of Glasgow. He grew up next to the local Church of Scotland, but his parents never attended it.

== Career ==
Ferguson studied at the University of Aberdeen for all of his university education, earning first a Master of Arts, then a bachelor of divinity (1965 - 1971), before gaining his Ph.D. During his days as a student, he worshiped at Gilcomston South Church, under the ministry of William Still.

Ferguson was ordained as a minister in the Church of Scotland by the Presbytery of Glasgow on 29 September 1971, after being licensed by them on 13 May that year. He became the assistant at St George's-Tron Church, in the centre of Glasgow under the ministry of George B. Duncan, who had served in the Church since March 1965.

On 4 April 1974, he became the minister of St. John's, Baltasound, the most northerly parish in Scotland, on the island of Unst, Shetland. He demitted that charge on 4 April 1976 to become the editor of the Banner of Truth Trust. He was later offered a teaching position as a part-time Professor of Systematic Theology at Westminster Theological Seminary, Philadelphia.

He then moved back to his native Scotland in 1997, filling the pulpit at St George's-Tron Church, Glasgow, where he served as Assistant Minister, succeeding the 20-year ministry of Eric Alexander. He was formally inducted on 1 July 1998.

In the mid-2000s, he then transferred back to the US to the Associate Reformed Presbyterian Church, serving as the senior pastor of historic First Presbyterian Church of Columbia, South Carolina.

From 25 August 2013, he served as a preacher and elder at St. Peter's Free Church of Scotland in Dundee. In recent years, Sinclair has become the preaching associate at Trinity Church in Aberdeen.

In 2022, a Festschrift was published in his honor. Theology for Ministry: How Doctrine Affects Pastoral Life and Practice includes contributions from Joel Beeke, Ligon Duncan, W. Robert Godfrey, Michael Horton, Douglas Kelly, Robert Letham, Philip Ryken, and Chad Van Dixhoorn.

=== Other roles ===
Ferguson has served as an editor with the Banner of Truth Trust.

He was also a professor of systematic theology at Redeemer Seminary in Dallas.

He has held the Charles Krahe Chair for Systematic Theology at Westminster Theological Seminary.

He also previously served as a council member of the Alliance of Confessing Evangelicals.

He serves as a Teaching Fellow for Ligonier Ministries.

== Personal life ==
Ferguson was born and raised in the East End of Glasgow, although his family originated from the north of Scotland. It wasn't until going to Aberdeen University that he left Glasgow. He was converted to Christianity before he turned 15.

He is married, since 16 July 1971, to Dorothy May Allan (born 29 April 1947). Together they have three sons and a daughter, and 12 grandchildren. His youngest son, John, is minister of Inverness Associated Presbyterian Church.

== Works ==
Ferguson speaks at numerous conferences worldwide. Books he has written, edited, or contributed to include:

- Know Your Christian Life (1981) ISBN 0-87784-371-6
- Kingdom Life in a Fallen World - Living Out the Sermon on the Mount (1986) ISBN 0-89109-194-7
- John Owen on the Christian Life (1987) ISBN 0-85151-503-7
- New Dictionary of Theology (Master Reference Collection) (1988) ISBN 0-8308-1400-0, editor with David Wright and J. I. Packer
- Daniel (Mastering the Old Testament, Vol 19) (1988) ISBN 0-8499-3557-1
- Grow in Grace (1989) ISBN 0-85151-557-6
- Children of the Living God (1989) ISBN 0-85151-536-3
- A Heart for God (1996) ISBN 0-85151-502-9
- The Christian Life (1996) ISBN 0-85151-516-9
- Discovering God's Will (1996) ISBN 0-85151-334-4
- Sermon on the Mount (1996) ISBN 0-85151-519-3
- The Pundit's Folly (1996) ISBN 0-85151-676-9
- Big Book of Questions and Answers (1997) ISBN 1-85792-295-6
- The Holy Spirit (1997) ISBN 0-8308-1536-8
- Let's Study Philippians (1998) ISBN 0-85151-714-5
- Reformed Confessions Harmonized (1999) ISBN 0-8010-5222-X, editor with Joel Beeke
- Let's Study Mark (1999) ISBN 0-85151-755-2
- The Big Book of Questions & Answers about Jesus (2000) ISBN 1-85792-559-9
- The Grace of Repentance (Today's Issues) (2000) ISBN 1-58134-165-2
- The Preacher's Commentary - Vol. 21 - Daniel (2002) ISBN 0-7852-4795-5
- John Owen: The Man and His Theology (2003) ISBN 0-87552-674-8, contributor about John Owen
- Let's Study Ephesians (2005) ISBN 0-85151-907-5
- Faithful God - An exposition of the book of Ruth (2005) ISBN 978-1-85049-216-0
- In Christ Alone: Living the Gospel Centered Life (2007)
- By Grace Alone: How the Grace of God Amazes Me (2010) ISBN 978-1567692020
- The Grace of Repentance (Redesign) (Today's Issues) (2011) ISBN 978-1433519833
- The Christian Life: A Doctrinal Introduction (2013) ISBN 978-1848712591
- Name above All Names (2013) with Alistair Begg ISBN 978-1433537752
- Deserted by God (2013) ISBN 978-1848711532
- The Whole Christ: Legalism, Antinomianism, & Gospel Assurance--Why the Marrow Controversy Still Matters (2016) ISBN 978-1433548000
- In The Year of Our Lord: Reflections on Twenty Years of Church History (2018) ISBN 978-1567699708
- Worthy: Living in Light of the Gospel (2023) ISBN 978-1-4335-8317-9
- Maturity
- The Dawn of Redeeming Grace (2021) ISBN 978-1-78498-638-4
