= Dundee Central Mosque =

Mosque in Dundee, Scotland, United Kingdom

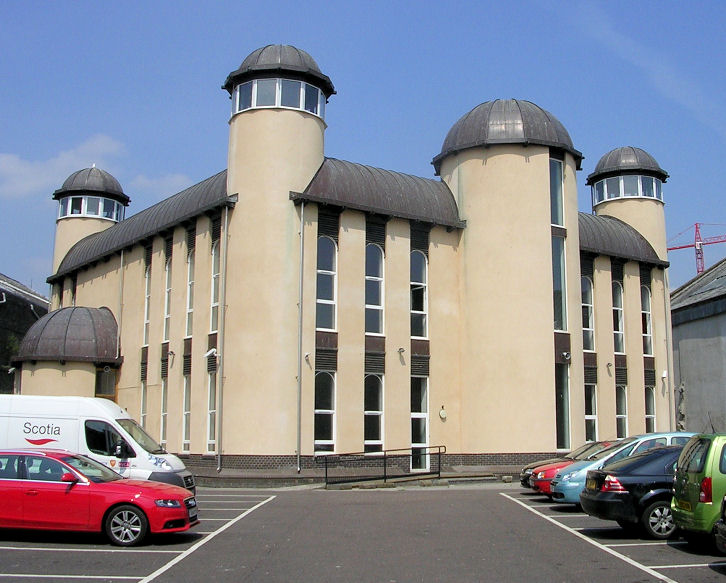

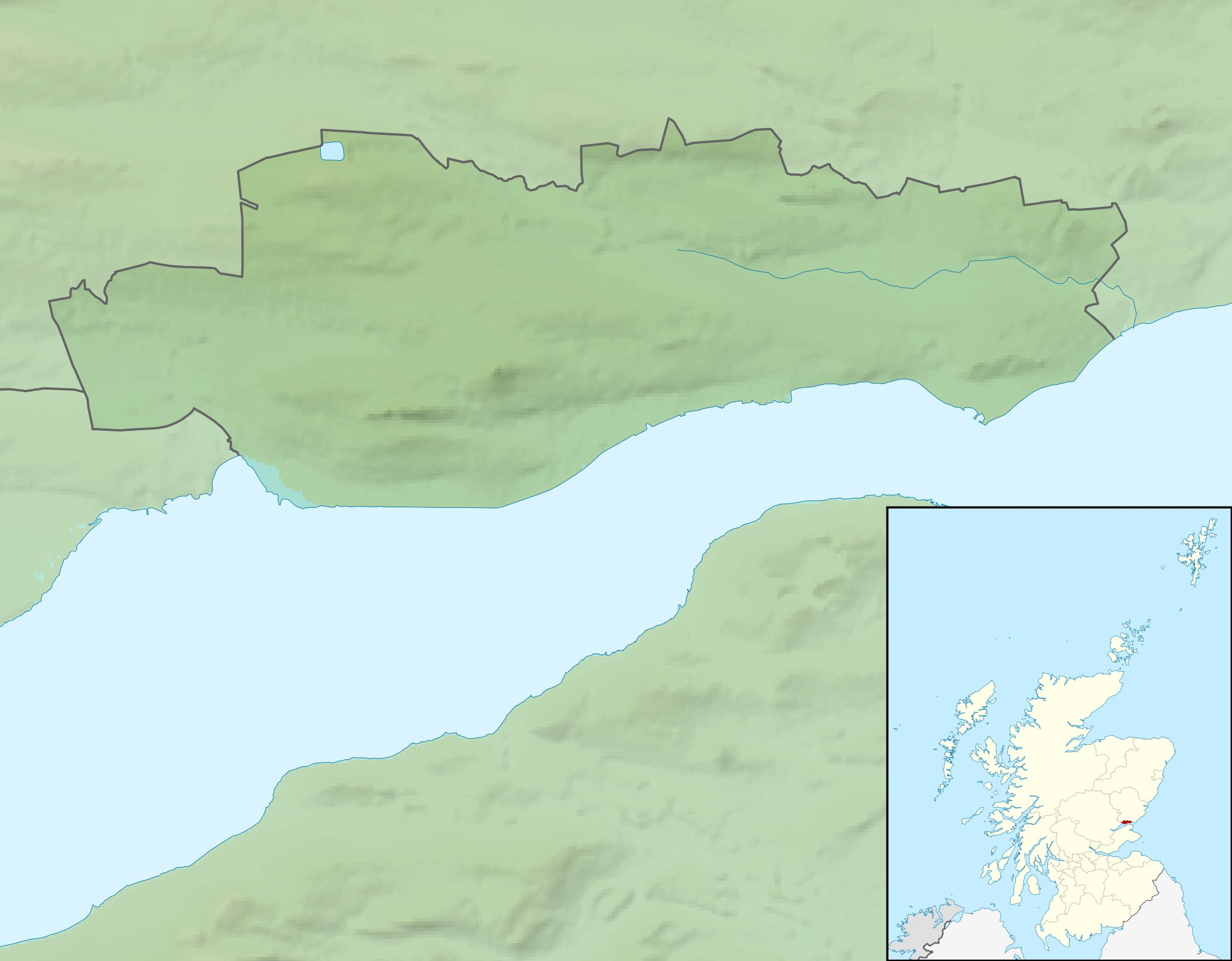
- Location within Dundee City council area

Religion
- Affiliation: Sunni Islam
- Sect: Deobandi
- Ecclesiastical or organizational status: Mosque
- Status: Active

Location
- Location: Dundee, Scotland
- Country: United Kingdom
- Interactive map of Dundee Central Mosque
- Coordinates: 56°27′42″N 2°58′50″W

Architecture
- Architect: Lucas Dow Design Studio
- Type: Mosque architecture
- Completed: 2000
- Construction cost: £2 million

Specifications
- Direction of façade: South-east
- Capacity: 1,000 worshipers
- Dome: Four
- Minaret: Four
- Materials: Stone; copper

Website
- dundeeislamicsociety.com

The Dundee Central Mosque (also known as the Jamia Mosque) is a Sunni Deobandi mosque, located on the junction of Brown and Miln streets, to the west of the city centre of Dundee, Scotland, in the United Kingdom. Completed in 1995, the mosque replaced an earlier mosque, completed in 1969, located on South Erskine Street.

== History ==
The Dundee Central Mosque was the first purpose-built mosque in north-east Scotland, designed and built to face Mecca to the south-east.

== Architecture ==
Designed by Lucas Dow Design Studio, the building is trapezoidal and constructed from smooth cream stone with a rounded copper roof. On each corner is a rounded tower, with a minaret and plain glass at the top. On the south elevation is the mihrab, a semi-circular projection from the wall, with a dome on top. Each elevation has groups of 2 to 4 full-length plain windows, arched in a rectangular frames. To the south-east of the mosque, at the other end of the car park, is the community centre.

Entrance to the mosque is gained by the northern elevation where shoe shelves line the wall. The male prayer room is located on the ground floor. It is a large bright space, carpeted with gold coloured lines on a red background, indicating where each man should stand. The ceiling is panelled with wood. On the south wall is the mihrab, a semi-circular space with a pulpit for the imams. The bare walls are painted white, showing uniform ashlar bricks. There are book cases in the south and east corner of the room with prayer beads, wooden stands and a clock for prayer time on the southern wall. Outside this room, located in the western corner of the mosque is the male washroom.

Directly above the male prayer room is the female prayer room. It is smaller, but again with gold lines on the red carpet for women to stand on. On the south wall is a bookshelf with religious texts and toys for small children on the floor. A washroom is separated by a screen to the north/north-west of the worship space.

== Imams ==
- Shaykh Mohammed Abdul Rauf
- Shaykh Hamza ibn Abdurrahman

...

== See also ==
- Islam in the United Kingdom
- Islam in Scotland
- List of mosques in the United Kingdom
