= St George's Tron Church =

Coordinates: 55.861832°N 4.253941°W

- The Parish Church of St George's Tron
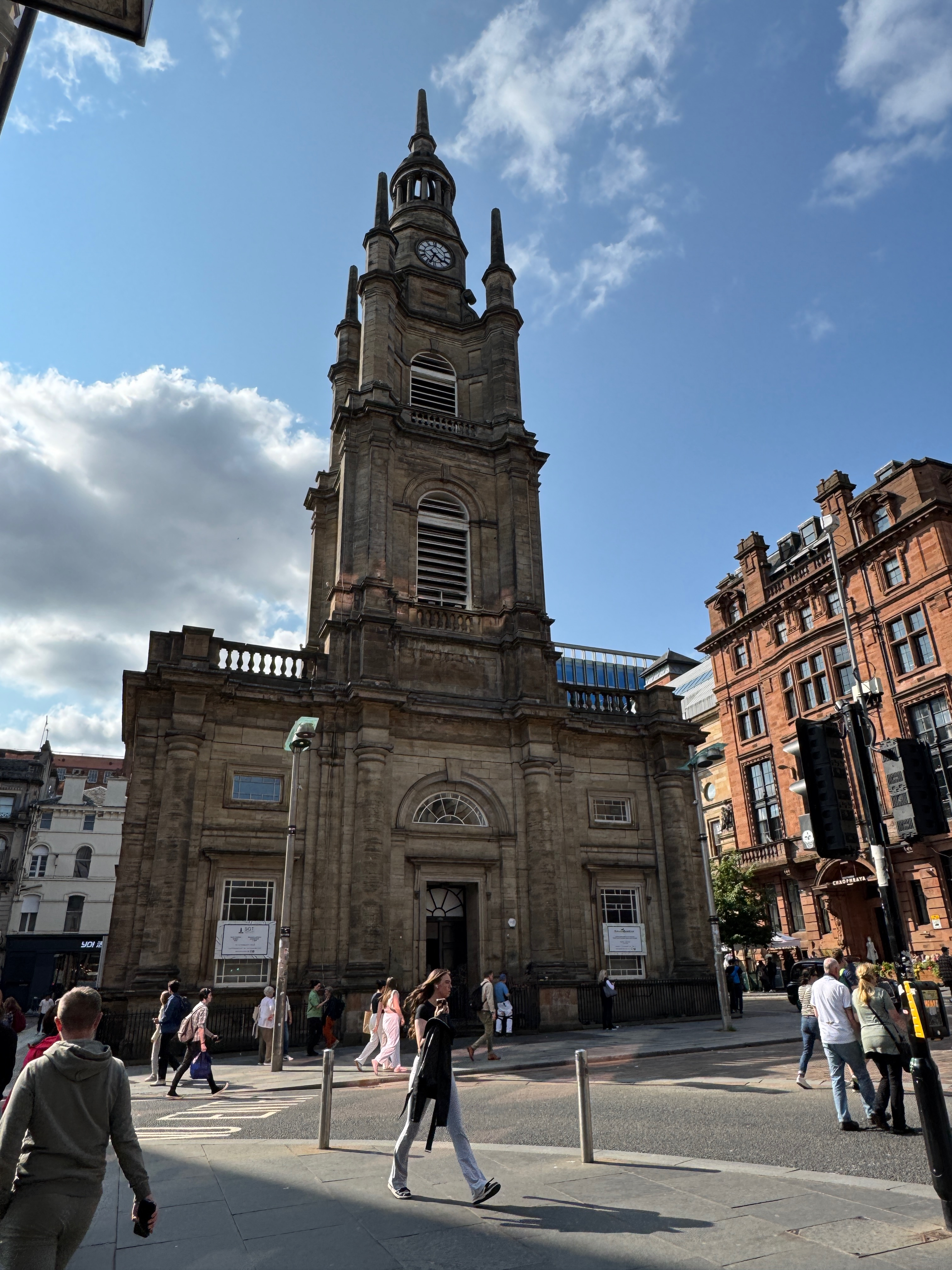
- The building in 2024
- St George's Tron Church
- Location: Glasgow
- Country: Scotland
- Denomination: Church of Scotland
- Churchmanship: Evangelical
- Website: Church Website

History
- Former name: St George's Parish Church
- Status: Active
- Dedication: Saint George

Architecture
- Functional status: Church
- Architect: William Stark
- Completed: 1808

Listed Building – Category A
- Designated: 6 July 1966
- Reference no.: LB33003

The St George's Tron Church, in Glasgow, Scotland, is a Church of Scotland church in the city centre, located in Nelson Mandela Place, previously known as St George's Place, fronting Buchanan Street at West George Street, along from Queen Street Station. It should not be confused with the 17th-century Tron Church, which lies to the south-west on Trongate and was redeveloped in the 1980s as the Tron Theatre. Located right on the busiest shopping street in Scotland (Buchanan Street), the building is a significant presence, and the oldest in the area. It stands as a terminating vista for West George Street.

== History ==
The church opened in 1808, originally as St. George's Parish Church, with the original congregation originating from the Wynd Church in the Merchant City near to the Trongate. In 1815 Thomas Chalmers, later to be the leader of the evangelical party in the disruption of 1843, became minister of the church. A merger with the Tron St Anne congregation (previously of the Laigh Kirk on Trongate) in 1940 led to the compound St George's Tron name coming into use.

A notable minister of the parish was Tom Allan, a key figure in the Scottish evangelical movement of the mid-20th century. Tom Allan died of a heart attack in 1965. His ministry was followed by that of George Baillie Duncan who developed a strong emphasis on biblical preaching and teaching and who served from 1965 to 1977. Another notable minister, also an evangelical, was Eric Alexander, who served from 1977 to 1997 as was Sinclair Ferguson who served in the late 1990s and early 2000s.

In 2004 Rev Dr William J. U. Philip became minister of the congregation, following a five-year term as Director of Ministry with the Proclamation Trust. During his ministry he oversaw the establishment of Cornhill Scotland, a training organisation for preachers and teachers of the Bible.

In 2012 the Reverend William Philip and the congregation left the Church of Scotland and moved to new premises on Bath Street where they have continued as an independent congregation under the name of the Tron Church.

=== Today ===
The Reverend Alastair Duncan was duly appointed as a Transition Minister for a 7 year period in order to re-plant a congregation in the landmark city centre church, before being formally inducted over zoom in 2020.

St George’s Tron is open to the public 7 days a week.

=== Recent activity ===
In 2015 Iain Campbell took up a temporary post as Artist-in-Residence at St George's. Campbell produced a painting titled "the last supper" depicting men in difficult personal circumstances dining at a table. This was to commemorate a cafe operated in the church which was a social enterprise project run in conjunction with Glasgow City Mission. The Glasgow Street Pastors continue to operate out of St George's Tron, using it as their "safe zone" on Friday and Saturday nights.

== Architecture ==
The building, which was commissioned by the City Fathers was designed by William Stark, was opened in 1808, originally as St. George's Parish Church.

=== Refurbishment ===
From 2007-9 the church building was refurbished by CRGP architects and surveyors. This restored a number of original features which had been concealed by practical alterations over the years as well as revealing and addressing structural weaknesses in the tower. The new interior is an open and contemporary design, making it an excellent location for the Wild Olive Tree cafe.

== See also ==
- George Baillie Duncan
- Sinclair Ferguson
