= Gilcomston Church =

Coordinates: 57°8′38.3″N 2°6′31.4″W

- Gilcomston South Church
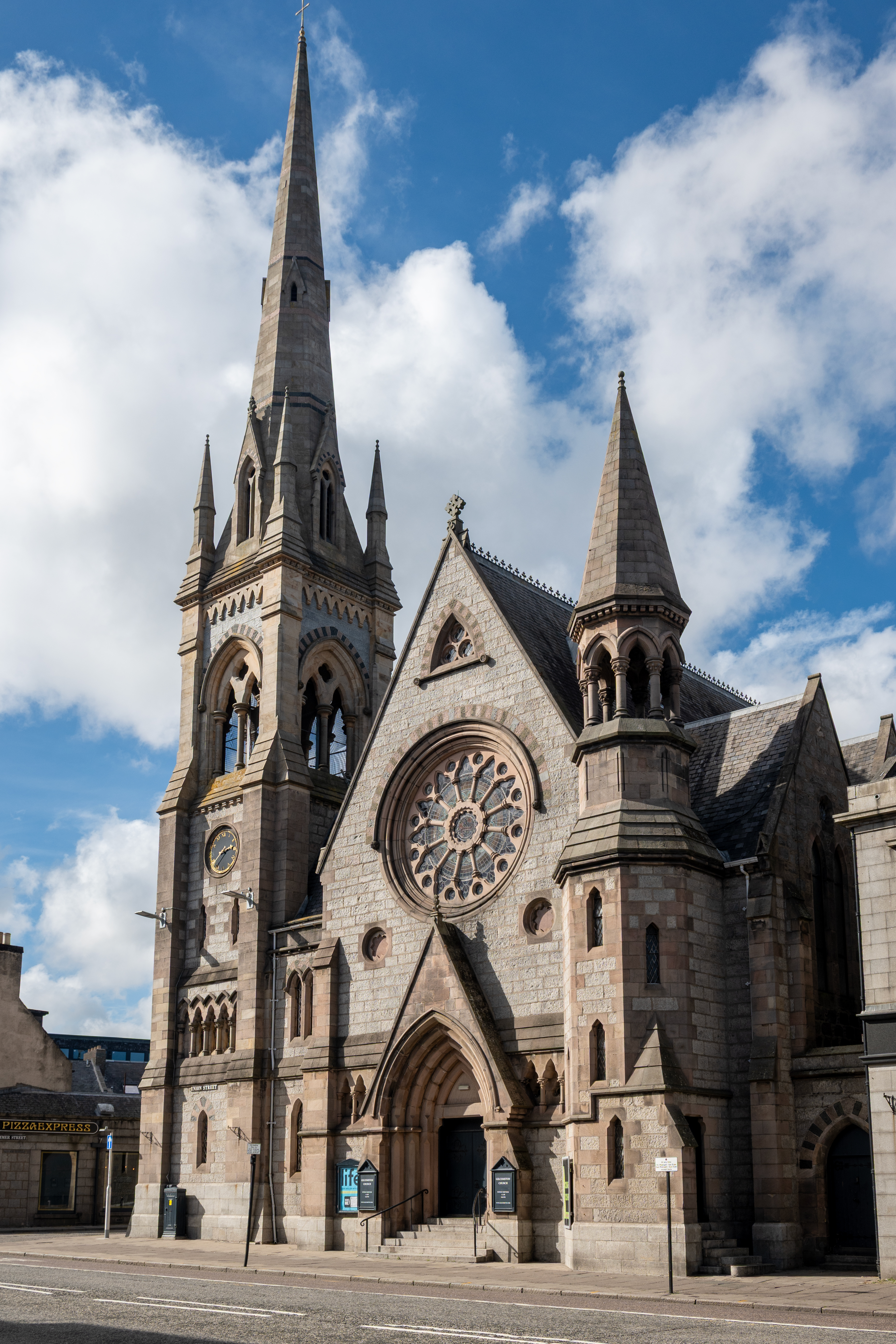
- Gilcomston Church
- Location: Aberdeen
- Country: Scotland, United Kingdom
- Language: English
- Denomination: Didasko
- Previous denomination: Church of Scotland
- Churchmanship: Evangelical
- Website: http://www.gilcomston.org/

History
- Former name: Gilcomston South Church
- Events: Spire added 1875 (rebuilt 1995); interior refurbished 2004 by LDN Architects

Architecture
- Heritage designation: Category B listed building
- Architect: William Smith
- Architectural type: 19th-century ecclesiastical architecture

Gilcomston Church is an evangelical congregation, a member of the Didasko fellowship, which meets in the church buildings on Union Street, Aberdeen. It was built in a 19th-century ecclesiastical architecture style. The congregation was formerly part of the Church of Scotland and known as Gilcomston South Church.

The building's asymmetrical layout stands out as a distinctive feature, reflecting the influence of the Camden Society and Ecclesiologists, a style later carried forward by the Aberdeen Ecclesiological Society through the late 19th century.

This church was designed by architect William Smith (1817-1891) and served as the second, more elaborate premises of the United Free Church in Aberdeen when opened on September 6th, 1868 with services from Rev. Mr Nixon and Rev. Dr Walter Macgilvray. It's spire was added in 1875 and later rebuilt in 1995. In 2004, the interior was refurbished by LDN Architects.

== Overview ==
The church almost closed during World War II, but a subsequent new approach proved controversial but ultimately highly influential. The church became one of the Church of Scotland's most notable evangelical congregations, with a strong emphasis on biblically based expository preaching. The Rev William Still, minister of the congregation 7 June 1945 – 8 May 1997, developed this approach and gained international recognition. The systematic preaching of the entire bible, verse-by-verse and chapter-by-chapter, was then an innovation in the Church of Scotland; some others have subsequently copied this approach. The Rev William Still was close friends with the brothers Rev James Philip of Holyrood Abbey Church in Edinburgh and Rev George Philip of Sandyford Henderson Memorial Church in Glasgow, where similar approaches in ministry were also developed. William Still never married.

The church is well attended, especially by students responding to this distinctive type of Christian ministry and witness. From 18 June 1998 to 2015, the minister was the Rev Dominic Smart.

In June 2011, Rev Dominic Smart indicated that the congregation were considering leaving the Church of Scotland due to the General Assembly's decision to move towards the ordination of homosexuals to the ministry. In February 2013 the Rev Dominic Smart announced on the church website that he was leaving the Church of Scotland. The Elders and almost the entire membership also left the Church of Scotland, and formed an independent congregation with the Minister. The congregation initially rented the church building from the Church of Scotland before purchasing it outright.

From 2016 until 2024 the minister was Rev. Jeremy Middleton, who had been minister at Davidson's Mains Church of Scotland from 1988 until 2015.

Rev. Nathan Owens, formerly a minister within the United Free Church of Scotland, was inducted as minister on 1 October 2024 and is still serving.

== Gallery ==
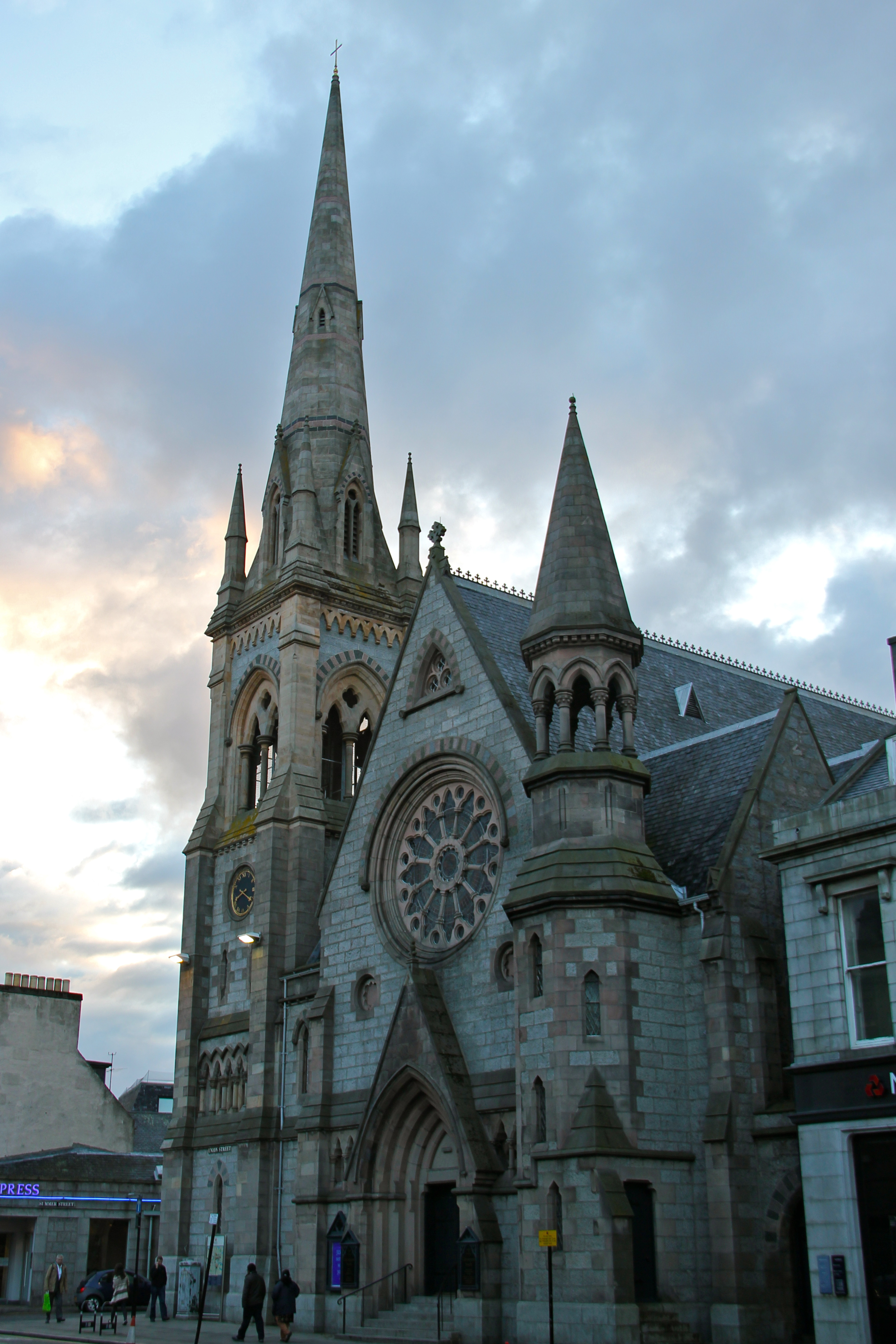
Gilcomston South Church main building

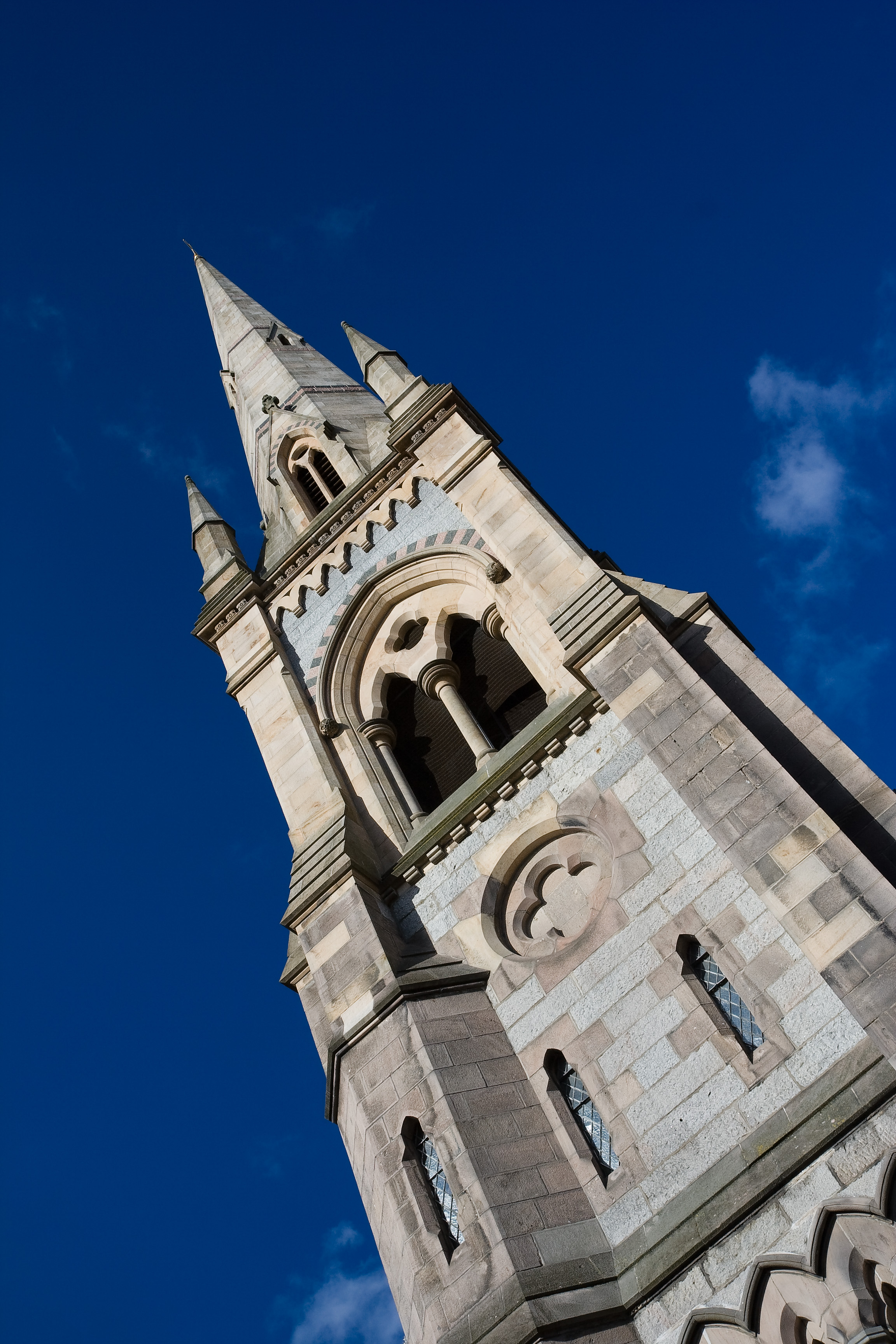
The tower of Gilcomston South Church

== See also ==
- List of Church of Scotland parishes
