= Gerrard Street Baptist Church =

Church in Aberdeen, Scotland

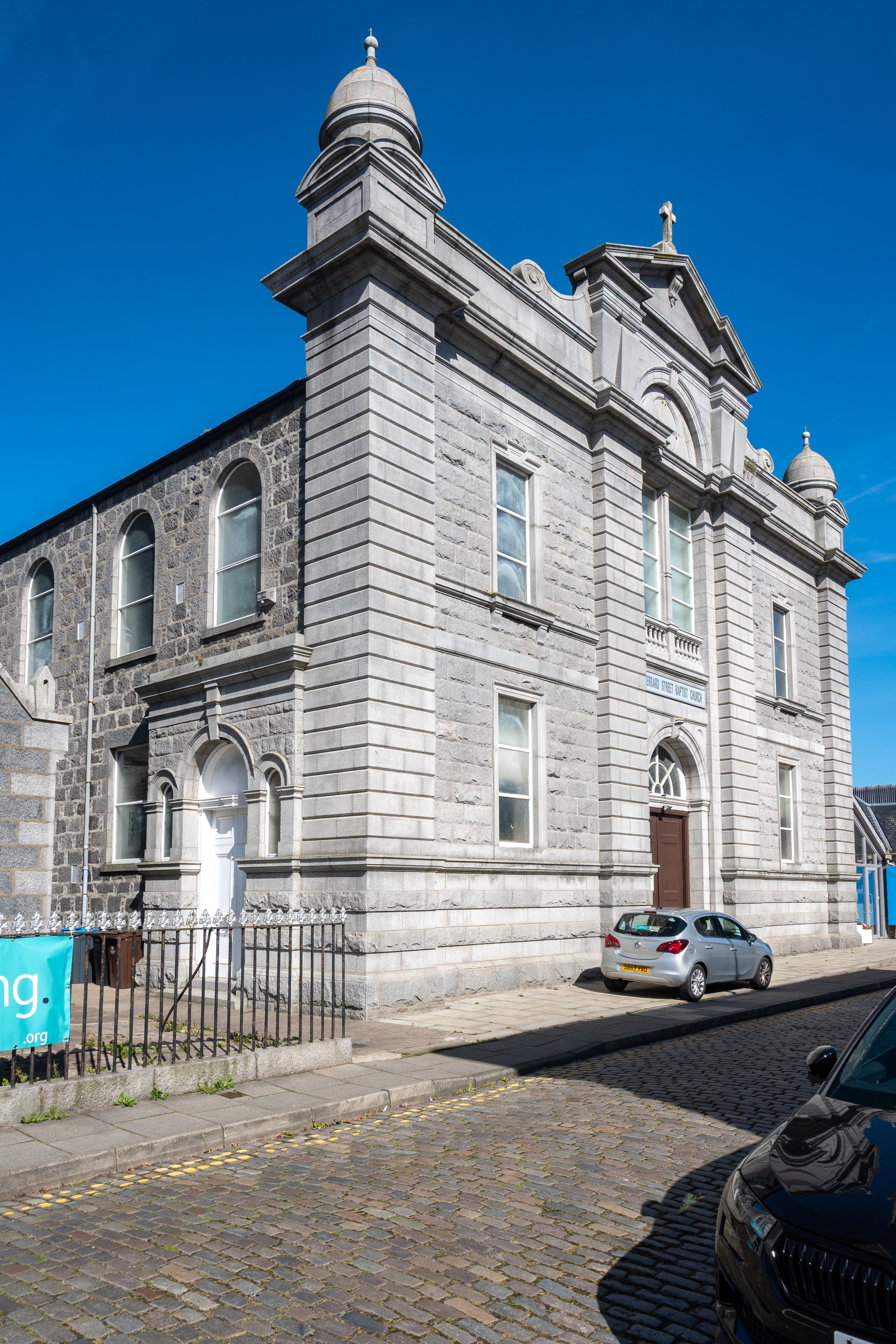
Gerrard Street Baptist Church

Gerrard Street Baptist Church, located in the city of Aberdeen in Scotland, is a Baptist church affiliated with the Baptist Union of Scotland.

== History ==
The building, originally belonging to the United Free Church of Scotland, was opened in 1900, although a church has existed on the site since 1844. The church, including an adjoining church hall, is a Category B listed building.
