= Muslim Council of Scotland =

Islamic organization based in Scotland, United Kingdom

- Abbreviation: MCS
- Formation: 2007
- Headquarters: Scotland, United Kingdom
- Website: mcscotland.org

The Muslim Council of Scotland (MCS) is an umbrella organisation of Islamic organisations in Scotland. Founded in 2007, the registered charity is based in Glasgow. It is focused on integrating Muslims into Scottish society and engaging the Scottish Muslim community with political and social initiatives. Over 100 organisations are affiliated with the MCS, including mosques, madrassas, media bodies and community centres and groups.

== See also ==
- Islam in Scotland
