= Meadowbank and Willowbrae Church =

Church in Edinburgh, Scotland

Coordinates: 55.9569°N 3.1640°W

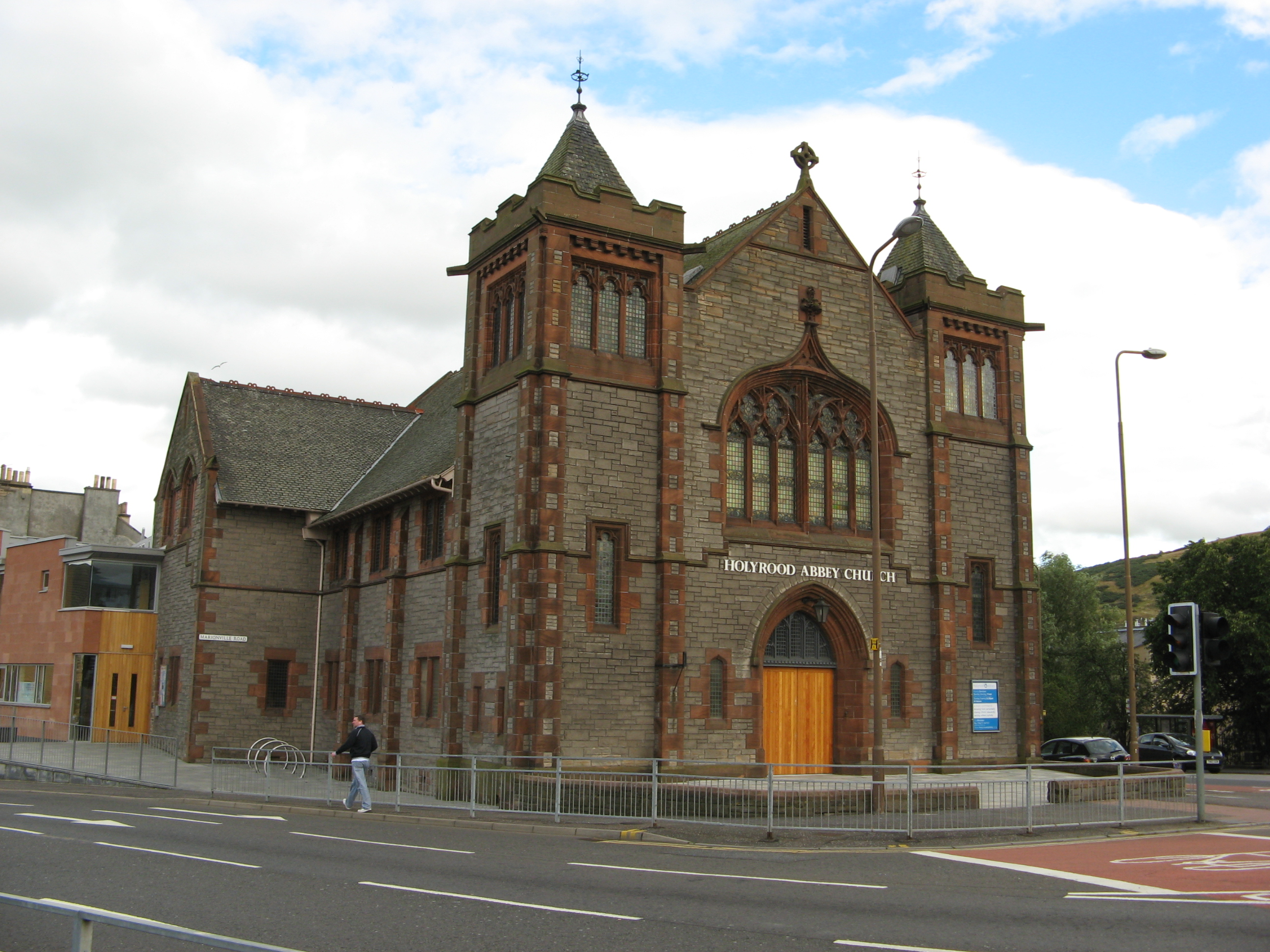
Meadowbank and Willowbrae Church

Meadowbank and Willowbrae Church (known until 2017 as Holyrood Abbey Church, and then until 2025 as Meadowbank Church) is a congregation of the Church of Scotland in Edinburgh, Scotland. It is based in a late-Victorian church building on London Road, Abbeyhill, around 0.5 miles (0.80 km) north of Holyrood Abbey. The church building was opened in December 1900 as Abbeyhill United Free Church.

The 12th-century Holyrood Abbey served as the parish church of the Canongate until the construction of the Kirk of the Canongate in 1688. Following the Disruption of 1843 in the Church of Scotland, part of the congregation of the Kirk of the Canongate left to form Holyrood Free Church. A new building was constructed by them on Abbey Strand, in front of the Palace of Holyroodhouse. In 1915 this congregation united with Abbeyhill United Free Church, henceforth using the church buildings at 83 London Road. When the United Free Church of Scotland united with the Church of Scotland in 1929, the congregation became known as Holyrood Abbey Church.

The former Holyrood United Free Church building adjacent to the Palace was used for many years as a storeroom, but in 2002 was extensively renovated and reopened as The Queen's Gallery, for art exhibitions from the Royal Collection.

The building at 83 London Road was designed by R M Cameron, and is protected as a category B listed building. It was extensively upgraded in 2006–2007.

The name Meadowbank and Willowbrae Church was adopted following a union between the congregations of Meadowbank Church of Scotland and Willowbrae Parish Church in September 2023. A closing service was held in the Willowbrae building (formerly known as New Restalrig) in June 2025 and that building is expected to be put up for sale by the end of 2025.

In 2014 the minister of Holyrood Abbey Church resigned over his disagreement with the Kirk's decision to accept homosexual ministers in marriages and civil partnerships. He led many of the congregation to set up Holyrood Evangelical Church, an independent congregation.

Due to the shortage of Church of Scotland ministers, and following the schisms within Holyrood Abbey and the nearby New Restalrig Parish Church, the Presbytery of Edinburgh decided to close the building on the corner of London Road and Easter Road used by London Road Church and unite that congregation with the remaining members of the Holyrood Abbey congregation. The union took place in February 2017 and the combined congregation was known as Meadowbank Church.
