= Didasko =

Scottish Calvinist denomination

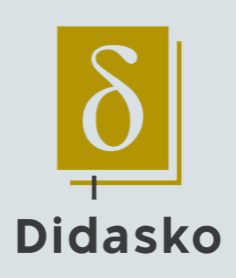
- Classification: Protestant
- Scripture: Bible
- Theology: Reformed Westminster Confession of Faith
- Polity: Presbyterian
- Region: Scotland
- Origin: 2017
- Separated from: Church of Scotland
- Congregations: 7 congregations in Scotland.
- Official website: https://sites.google.com/view/didaskoscotland/home

Didasko is a family of conservative-evangelical Presbyterian churches in Scotland which have formed a presbytery. It was formed in 2017 as a result of five congregations leaving the Church of Scotland, primarily due to disagreements about human sexuality.

The name comes from a Latinisation of the Greek διδασκω, meaning "I teach".

== Origin ==
In 2008, the Presbytery of Aberdeen appointed Scott Rennie, a Church of Scotland minister, to serve within its bounds at Queen's Cross Church; the first time that a congregation and presbytery had voted to appoint an openly gay minister. This caused division within the denomination, resulting in some ministers, elders and members leaving the denomination, largely beginning in 2011 with High Hilton Church in Aberdeen. In addition, some congregations split, resulting in a breakaway church, and some congregations decided to leave the denomination as a whole.

Ministers, congregations and breakaways have joined the Free Church of Scotland, the International Presbyterian Church and United Free Church of Scotland. However, the original five congregations (Cornerstone Community Church, Edinburgh North Church, Grace Church Dundee, Gilcomston and Tron Church) in the Didasko Presbytery came together to form a fellowship of their own.

== Theology ==
Didasko is a collection of evangelical Presbyterian congregations in Scotland.

Originally self-described as a "a confessing fellowship", in that "we confess the faith of Christ crucified, stand firm for the biblical gospel, affirm the historic creeds of catholic Christianity, and hold as a subordinate standard the Westminster Confession of Faith (Scripture itself being the only ultimate authority and standard)." it now normally uses the term Presbytery.

They are committed to work, pray and support each other in their common mission to proclaim the Good News of Christ to the people of Scotland and beyond.

== Churches ==
| Church | Location | Minister | Web | Founded | Notes |
|---|---|---|---|---|---|
| Cornerstone Community Church | Stirling | Rev. Calum Jack | https://cornerstonestirling.org/ | 2015 | Split from Stirling North Church of Scotland |
| Edinburgh North Church | Edinburgh | Rev. Stephen Ballingall | http://edinburghnorth.church/ | 2015 | Split from St Stephen's Comely Bank Church of Scotland |
| Grace Church Dundee | Dundee | Vacant | https://www.gracechurchdundee.co.uk/ | | Split from Logie & St John’s (Cross) Church of Scotland |
| Gilcomston | Aberdeen | Rev. Nathan Owens | https://www.gilcomston.org/ | | Congregation of Gilcomston South Church of Scotland |
| Maxwell Church | Kilmaurs | Andrew Whitmarsh | https://maxwellchurch.com/ | 2024 | Moved from United Free Church of Scotland. |
| Trinity Church | Bishopbriggs | Garry Brotherston | https://trinity-church.co.uk/ | 27 Jan 2025 | Split from the majority of the congregation leaving Bishopbriggs Free Church. |
| The Tron Church | Glasgow | Rev. William Philip | https://www.tron.church/ | | Congregation of St George's-Tron Church of Scotland. |

== Partnerships ==
Didasko is a member of Affinity.
