= George Baillie Duncan =

George Baillie Duncan (born India, 1912; died Isle of Wight, 4 April 1997) was a prominent evangelical Anglican and Church of Scotland minister, and Keswick Convention speaker.

== Biography ==
George Duncan was born in India of missionary parents in 1912, and brought up in Scotland. His father had previously been a minister in Edinburgh.

He was educated at Merchiston Castle School and the University of Edinburgh. And, he later studied for the ministry at the Church of England training seminary, Oak Hill College, in London. He was ordained into the Church of England, and he served as curate at Broadwater Parish Church, Worthing. He had three further ministries at St James's, Carlisle; St Thomas's English Episcopal Church, Edinburgh; and Christ Church, Cockfosters (1951-8), where he was succeeded by the Rev. Kenneth Hooker. In all three places, there was church growth under his leadership.

Returning to Scotland he ministered at Portland Church, Troon, for six years, before moving to St George's Tron Church, Glasgow, after the death of Tom Allan; he ministered here from 1965 to 1977. During that time, Sinclair Ferguson was a student with him. In retirement he was a member at the Edinburgh Barclay Church.

From 1947 he was a well-known speaker at the annual Keswick Convention; and also spoke regularly at the Filey Christian Holiday Crusade, organized by the Movement for World Evangelisation, of which he was the Chairman and President. He spoke at Keswick more than virtually every other speaker in the 150 year history. He also served as member of the council for the Keswick Convention, and later as a trustee. As a result, he had many requests to preach across the world, and in 1959 had a year of preaching across the globe on behalf of the Keswick convention.

Later in retirement, he lived in East Sussex, where he wrote several books, as well as preaching regularly. His wife died in 1989. Together, they had two daughters and two sons. He died on 4 April 1997 at his daughter's home on the Isle of Wight.

== Works ==
- Duncan, George B. (1960). The Life of Continual Rejoicing: Studies in the Epistle to the Philippians.
- ——— (1965). Living the Christian Life.
- ——— (1965). Mastery in the Storm.
- ——— (1972). Pastor and People: A Devotional Commentary on 2 Corinthians. Word Books.
- ——— (1973). The Person and Work of the Holy Spirit in the Life of the Believer. - later edition: The Renewing Spirit
- ——— (1975). Day by Day with George Duncan.
- ——— (1977). It Could be Your Problem.
- ——— (1977). Wanting the Impossible. Preaching for Today.
- ——— (1981). Week by Week with George Duncan.
- ——— (1984). A Preacher among the Prophets.
- ——— (1986). Marks of Christian Maturity.
- ——— (1989). Preach The Word. London: Marshall Pickering.
