= Glasgow Central Mosque =

Mosque in Glasgow, Scotland, United Kingdom

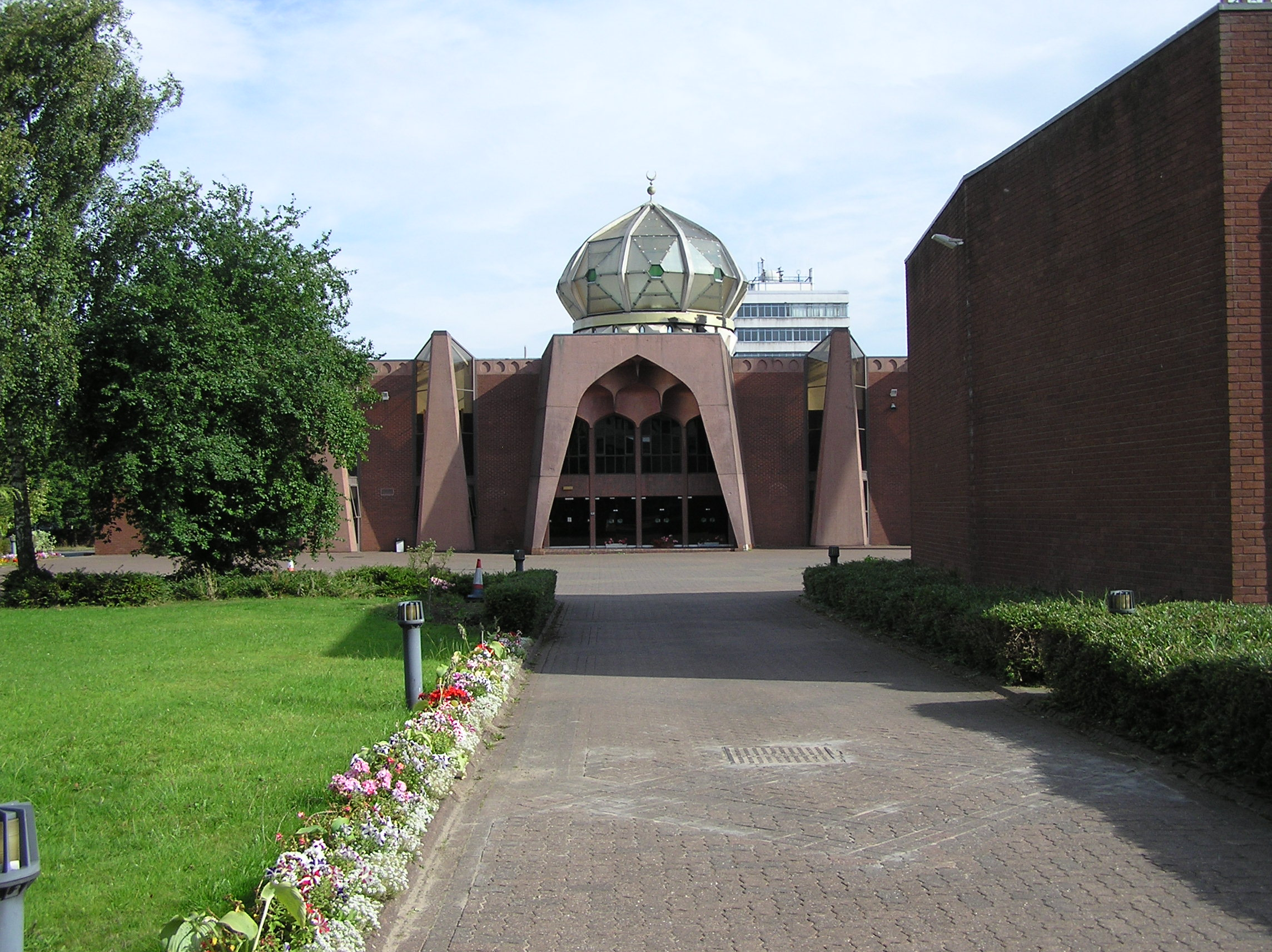

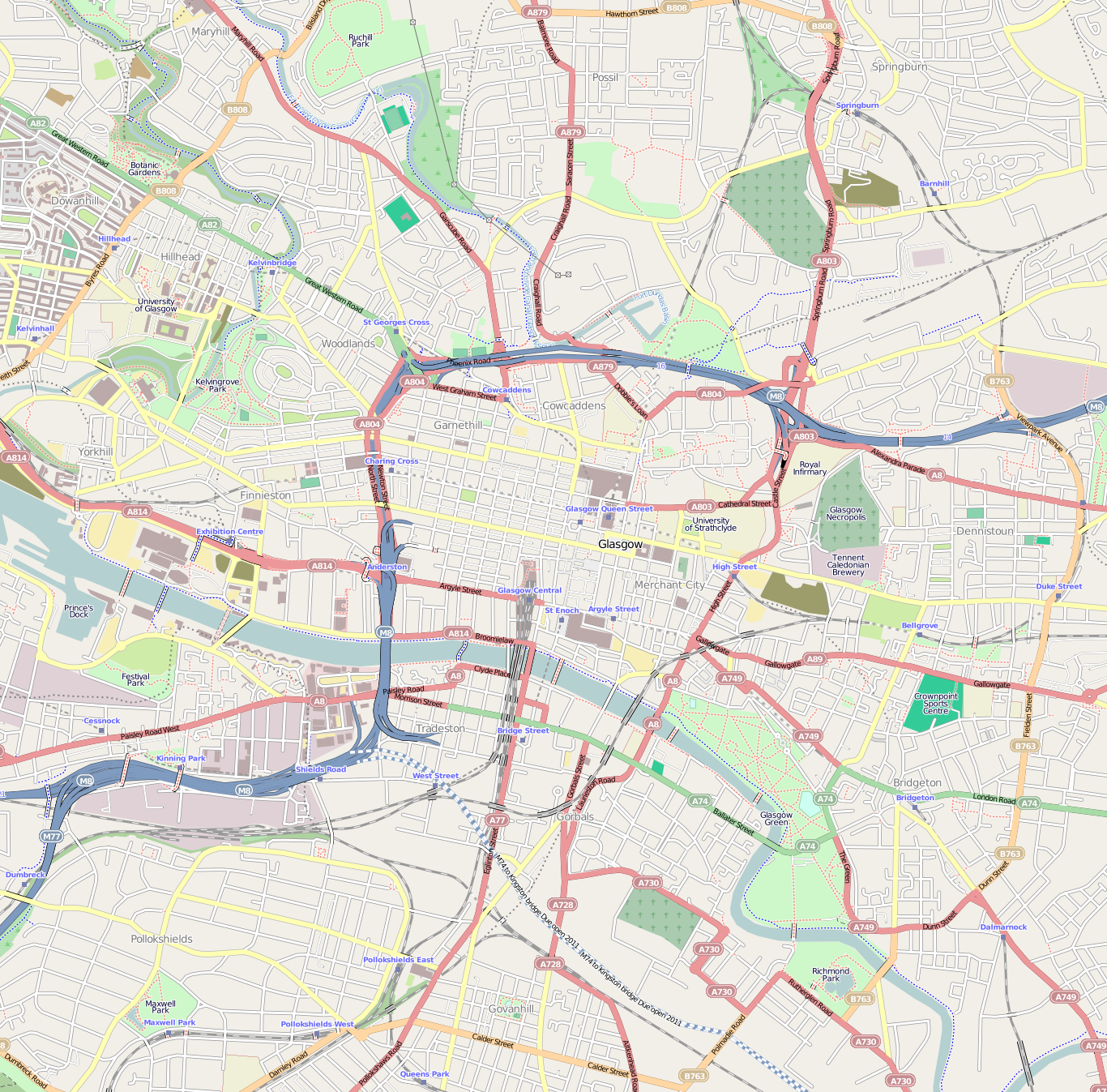
- Location of the mosque in central Glasgow

Religion
- Affiliation: Sunni Islam
- Ecclesiastical or organizational status: Mosque
- Status: Active

Location
- Location: Glasgow, Scotland
- Country: United Kingdom
- Interactive map of Glasgow Central Mosque
- Coordinates: 55°51′9″N 4°15′3″W

Architecture
- Architect: Coleman Ballantine
- Type: Mosque architecture
- Style: Islamic
- Completed: 1983
- Construction cost: £3 million

Specifications
- Capacity: 4,000 worshipers
- Dome: One
- Minaret: One
- Materials: Old red sandstone

Website
- centralmosque.co.uk

The Glasgow Central Mosque is a Sunni Deobandi mosque, located on the south bank of the River Clyde in the Gorbals district of central Glasgow, Scotland, in the United Kingdom.

The Islamic Centre is the central institution for the local Muslim community, and is the largest community centre in Strathclyde. With capacity for 4,000 worshippers, it is Scotland's largest mosque. The mosque was designed by Coleman Ballantine Partnership Architects in the Islamic style built in old red sandstone, and was completed in 1983.

== Controversies ==
In February 2016, Habib ur Rehman Rauf, (Note: Sometimes spelled Habib ur Rahman Rauf.) then-religious head of the mosque (who moved to an Edinburgh mosque in 2020), was quoted in the media supporting the actions of Mumtaz Qadri, who assassinated Pakistani politician Salman Taseer whilst acting as his security guard. Habib said his "comments were 'misconstrued' and said the situation had added to his 'sense of tragedy' following recent terror attacks." Qadri disagreed with Taseer's opposition to Pakistan's blasphemy law.

In April 2016, the International Business Times said that the mosque held annual Khatme Nabuwwat conferences. The mosque president, Dr Mohammed Shafi Kausar said there was no secular group at the mosque. Also in April 2016, representatives of Glasgow Central Mosque ostensibly accepted but then declined to appear at the last minute at a vigil in memory of Asad Shah, a Pakistani shopkeeper assassinated by a Pakistani Muslim extremist.

== Imams ==
There are three imams at the mosque:

- Shaykh Muhammad Vaez
- Shaykh Abdul Ghafoor Ahmad
- Qari Wali Ahmed

== See also ==
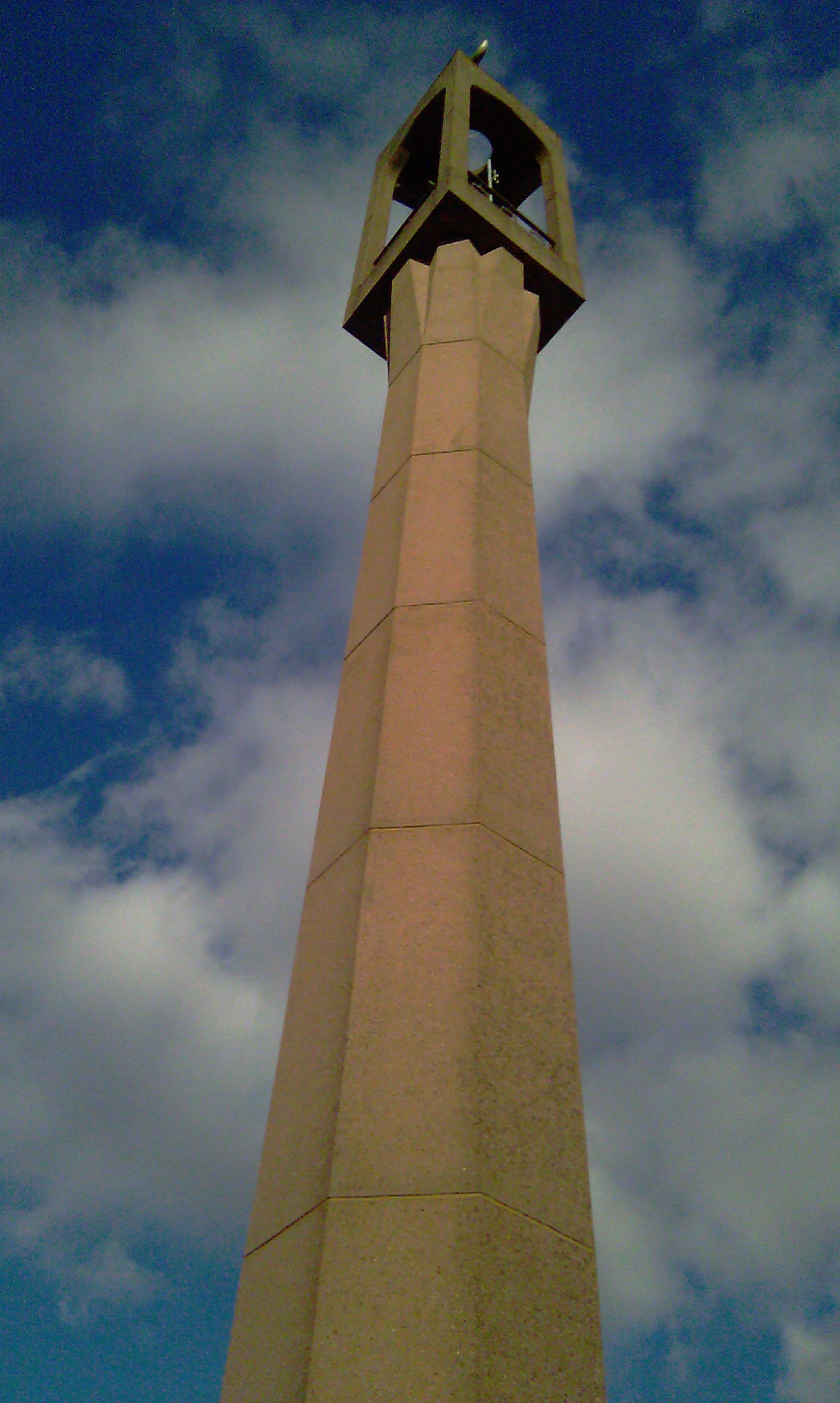
The mosque minaret of the mosque

- Islam in the United Kingdom
- List of mosques in the United Kingdom
