= Masjid Alhikmah =

Mosque in Aberdeen, Scotland, United Kingdom

Masjid Alhikmah and Community Centre
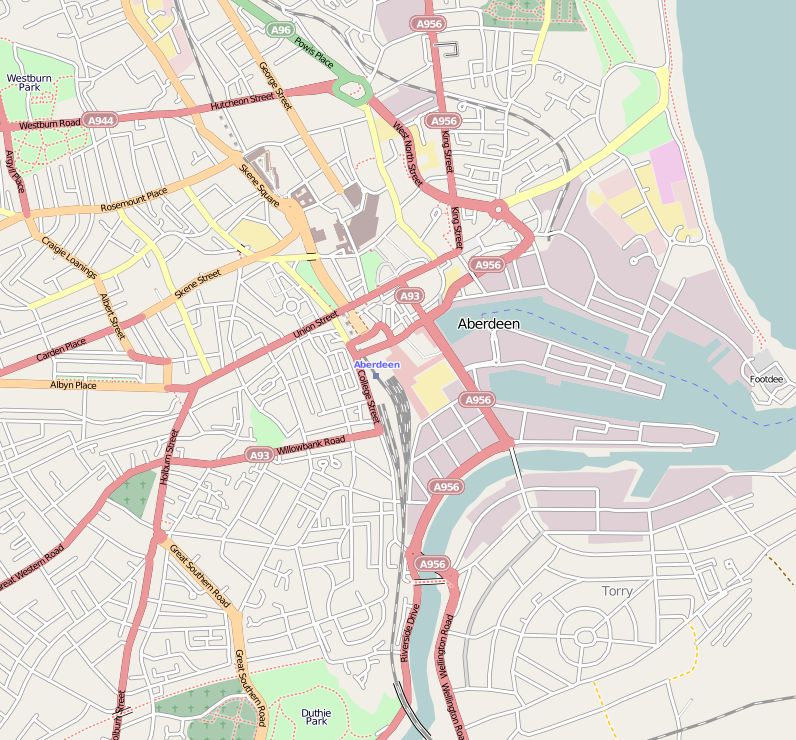
- Location within Central Aberdeen

Religion
- Affiliation: Islam
- Branch/tradition: Sunni

Location
- Location: Nelson Street, Aberdeen, Scotland
- Interactive map of Masjid Alhikmah and Community Centre
- Coordinates: 57°09′15″N 2°05′51″W

Website
- https://masjidalhikmah.org.uk/

Masjid Alhikmah and Community Centre is the second major mosque in Aberdeen, Scotland. It was constructed to meet the needs of Aberdeen's growing Muslim community in Aberdeen.

Current facilities include separate designated prayer halls for men and women, a funerary bathing area, a recreational space, a meeting room, and a crèche.

Along with the other mosques in Aberdeen, Masjid Alhikmah hosts open days for anyone who wishes to attend and learn about Islam first hand.

Masjid Alhikmah has also proposed to renovate the derelict Nelson Street playing fields opposite the mosque for the benefit of the whole community. The project, called Urban Fields, is set to be carried out by DMA Architects.

== History ==
Masjid Alhikmah was founded by the registered Scottish charity known as the Alhikmah Foundation. The foundation, formed in 2013, set to work straight away on their fundraising project to fund the cost of building the mosque. By the end of 2015 they had almost completed their target by acquiring funds close to £2million.

Construction of the mosque started in early 2015 and finished in 2018. The mosque opened its doors shortly before the Islamic month of Ramadhan in 2018.
