= Scottish Protestant missions =

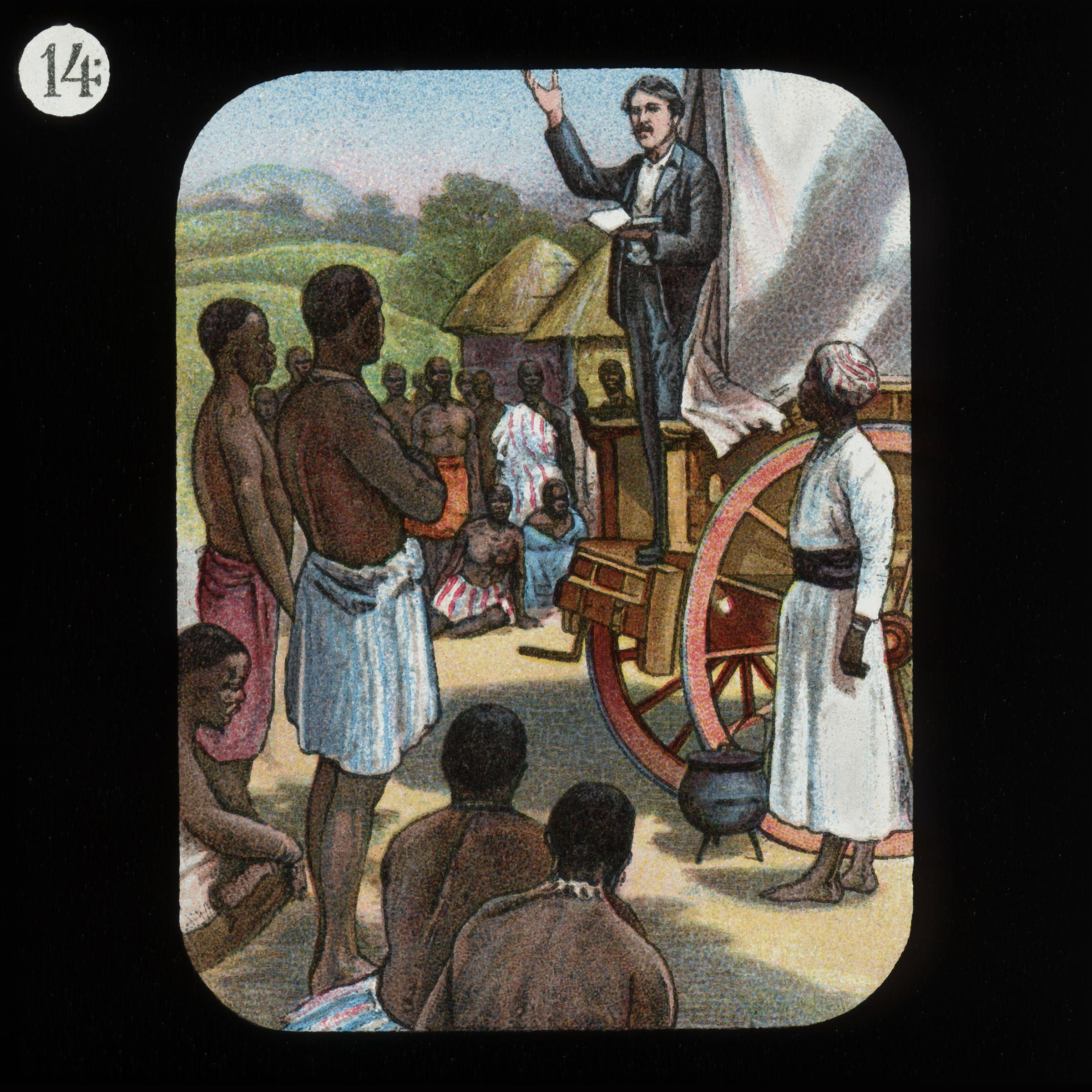
David Livingstone preaching from a wagon in one of the illustrations that were used at home to relate missionary work to audiences in Britain

Scottish Protestant missions are organised programmes of outreach and conversion undertaken by Protestant denominations within Scotland, or by Scottish people. Long after the triumph of the Church of Scotland in the Lowlands, Highlanders and Islanders clung to a form of Christianity infused with animistic folk beliefs and practices. From 1708 the Society in Scotland for Propagating Christian Knowledge (SSPCK) began working in the area. In 1797 James Haldane founded the non-denominational Society for the Propagation of the Gospel at Home. Dozens of lay preachers, divinity students and English preachers were sent to the region. In the early nineteenth century a variety of organisations were formed to support evangelism to the region.

From the late eighteenth century the Industrial Revolution led to a rapid urbanisation of Scottish society. This created alarm amongst the Christians of the new Middle Class. The first urban mission was founded in Glasgow in 1826 and drew on all the Protestant churches. Thomas Chalmers advocated the "aggressive method", emphasising self-reliance backed up by intensive Sunday school and evangelistic efforts. By the 1870s every middle class urban congregation had its evangelisation association and usually a mission station. An inter-denominational Home Mission Union in Glasgow was formed in 1885 which ensured that rivalries did not develop. The "Layman's Revival" reached Scotland in 1859 and lasted until 1862. The visit of American Evangelists Moody and Sankey in 1874–75 revitalised the Evangelical mission.

The Scottish churches were relatively late to take up the challenge of foreign missions, but they came to embrace them enthusiastically. They were among the leading forces in European and American activity in India, sub-Saharan Africa, the West Indies, China and the New Hebrides, and missionary work became one of their major contributions to the business of Empire. Scottish foreign missionary work was mainly undertaken by small, local organisations that were often inter-denominational. The most famous Scottish missionary, David Livingstone, became an icon of evangelic outreach, self-improvement, exploration and a form of colonialism. Women also played a major role with single women like Mary Slessor becoming missionaries in their own right.

The Evangelical effort began to decline in intensity in the final decades of the nineteenth century. Urban religion became dominated by the working classes themselves, with new proletarian organisations. In the early twentieth century the focus of the churches broadened to include social problems. The 1910 World Missionary Conference held in Edinburgh, has been seen as the culmination of nineteenth-century Protestant Christian missions. The missionary drive began to decline after the First World War, although the Church of Scotland continued to attach importance to its efforts. Most of the imperial aspects of the foreign missionary project had gone by the 1950s and humanitarian efforts began to be more significant. Despite declining church attendances Evangelical missions continued in Scotland into the twentieth century. There were a series of initiatives connected with the re-united Church of Scotland between 1947 and 1956. The Tell Scotland Movement resulted in the controversial 1955 Billy Graham All-Scotland Crusade, which arrested the decline in church attendance. However, attendance declined rapidly from the 1960s, resulting in a reduction in home mission activity. Most evangelism was now left to local congregations and it was much smaller in scale. By the twenty-first century the increasingly secularised Scotland became the subject of a number of "reverse mission" from countries that Europeans and North Americans had originally evangelised.

== Highlands and Islands ==
James Haldane, retired sea captain and founder of the non-denominational Society for the Propagation of the Gospel at Home

Long after the triumph of the Church of Scotland in the Lowlands, Highlanders and Islanders clung to a form of Christianity infused with animistic folk beliefs and practices. The cults of saints like Bride and Maelrubha persisted, beside rituals like the sacrifice of bulls and the cleansing of milk, along with tales of fairies, kelpies and other beasts. There had been localised success during the Reformation, undermined by a shortage of Gaelic-speaking clergy and the vast scale and inaccessibility of some parishes.

The Scottish Society for the Promotion of Christian Knowledge (SSPCK) was founded by Royal Charter in 1708. Its aim was partly religious and partly cultural, intending to "wear out" Gaelic and "learn the people the English tongue". By 1715 it was running 25 schools, by 1755 it was 116 and by 1792 it was 149, but most were on the edges of the Highlands. The difficulty of promoting Protestantism and English in a Gaelic-speaking region eventually led to a change of policy in the SSPCK and in 1754 it sanctioned the printing of a Bible with Gaelic and English text on facing pages. The government only began to seriously promote Protestantism from 1725, when it began to make a grant to the General Assembly known as the Royal Bounty. Part of this went towards itinerant ministers, but by 1764 there were only ten. Probably more significant for the spread of Protestantism were the lay catechists, who met the people on the Sabbath, read Scripture, and joined them in Psalms and prayers. They would later be important in the Evangelical revival.

In 1797 James Haldane founded the non-denominational Society for the Propagation of the Gospel at Home. Dozens of lay preachers, divinity students and English preachers, such as Charles Simeon (1759–1836) and Rowland Hill (1744–1833), were sent to the region. They preached an evangelical gospel, influenced by the ideas of Tom Paine and established independent churches across the Highlands. When Haldane and his brother Robert accepted the principle of adult baptism in 1808 most of them became Baptist chapels. Gaelic school societies were founded, beginning in Edinburgh in 1811, supporting travelling schools to the northern Highlands and western Isles. The Congregational Union of Scotland was formed in 1812 to promote home missions. In 1827 the Baptists consolidated their efforts in the Baptist Home Missionary Society. In 1824 the government provided funds to build 32 churches and 41 manses in the Highlands. After the Disruption in 1843 most of the expansion was in new churches established by the Free Church. Missions to fishermen and seamen began with the Seamen's Friend Societies.

The mission to the Highlands and Islands was highly successful in transforming the religious complexion of the region and the lives of the people. It succeeded in creating a stronghold of Evangelical Presbyterianism. At the Great Disruption in 1843 most of the clergy and congregations would demonstrate their allegiance by leaving the Church of Scotland for the breakaway Free Church. Callum Brown argues that the mission to the Highlands and Hebrides was Scotland's first "foreign" mission and acted as a "dry run" for future work in Africa and Asia.

== Urban missions ==
From the late eighteenth century the Industrial Revolution led to a rapid urbanisation of Scottish society. By 1859 almost a third of the population were resident in a town of more than 10,000 people. This created alarm amongst the Christians of the new Middle Class, who noted that there were insufficient churches to accommodate the growing number of urban workers and their families. Preaching in 1827 Thomas Chalmers warned of the "home heathens", "paganism" and "dense irreligion" of an urban poor who were alienated from the Church, morality and the social order. Fears of non-church going would be confirmed nationally by the "emergency" revealed in the Census of 1851. The result was a new emphasis on Christianising the urban working classes that resulted in a series of missions to the towns.

The first urban mission was founded by David Nasmith (1799–1839) in Glasgow in 1826 and drew on all the Protestant churches. This City Mission spread to almost every British and Irish city and the US. Chalmers' experiment in St. John's, Glasgow, published in The Christian and Civic Economy of Large Towns (1821–26), provided a model of urban mission based on lay visitation. He advocated the "aggressive method", in which poor relief was replaced with a voluntary system, distributed parsimoniously to the poor after intrusive questioning by church elders. The emphasis on self-reliance was backed up by intensive Sunday school and evangelistic efforts, underlined by frequent visitations, sometimes as often as once a month, undertaken by large number of volunteers who pressured parents and workers to participate. The system was widely adopted by the Free Church after the Great Disruption and would be taken up by the Church of Scotland under the leadership of A. H. Charteris (1835–1908) in the 1870s. By the 1870s, every middle class urban congregation had its evangelisation association and usually a mission station, where members of the working classes were encouraged to strive for financial independence and the status of full congregational membership. After the expansion of congregations in the 1860s and 1870s there was considerable duplication of effort and competition between churches and denominations in Glasgow. As a result, an inter-denominational Home Mission Union was formed in 1885, which divided the city into small districts, ensuring that the whole city was covered and that rivalries did not develop.

A new wave of urban revivalism began in New York in 1858, sometimes called the "Layman's Revival" because of the prominence of lay preachers. It reached Scotland the next year following a trade depression and enthusiasm would continue in a heightened form until 1862. In the major manufacturing districts of the country, prayer meetings were held in offices and factories and in the streets of Edinburgh and Glasgow. Some viewed the revival with alarm, as it caused absenteeism from work and long prayer meetings disrupted the working day. The visit of American Evangelists Ira D. Sankey (1840–1908), and Dwight L. Moody (1837–99) to Edinburgh and Glasgow in 1874–75 revitalised the Evangelical mission, leading to the founding of the Glasgow United Evangelistic Association. The Tent Hall was opened in the city in 1876, which hosted poor relief and evangelical meetings, and the Bible Training Institute for training lay evangelists was founded in 1892. Charteris was instrumental in the foundation of the Women's Guild in 1887, which underlined the role of women in the missions. They also acted as Biblewomen, reading scriptures, and dominated teaching in the Sunday schools.

Urban missions did not succeed in gaining the religious loyalty of the mass of the urban working classes and were beginning to lose their effectiveness by the last decades of the nineteenth century. However, although the majority of the working classes did not come to attend churches, the success of the urban missions was that the working class did make up the majority of those who did attend and support the churches and would later shape the ideas of the trade union and labour movements.

== Overseas missions ==
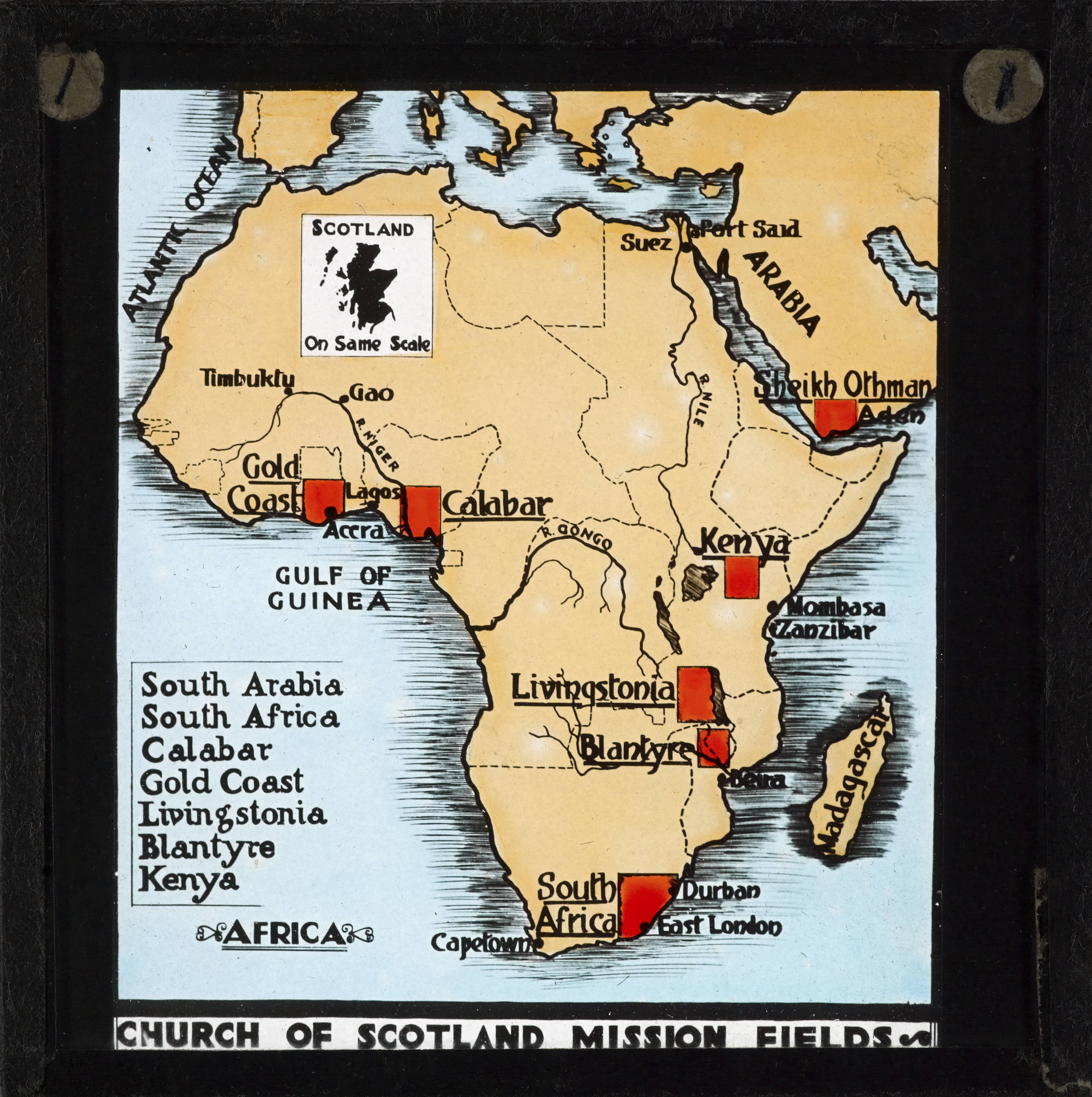
Map of Church of Scotland Mission Fields, late nineteenth century

The Scottish churches were relatively late in taking up the challenge of foreign missions, but they came to embrace it enthusiastically. They were among the leading forces in European and American activity in India, sub-Saharan Africa, the West Indies, China and the New Hebrides, and missionary work became one of their major contributions to the business of Empire. Most missionaries worked within either a medical or educational context, establishing schools, universities and hospitals. Scottish missionary efforts were fuelled by the rivalry between different denominations in Scotland, and may have helped distract from problems at home. The missions were popularised at home by publications and illustrations, often particularly designed to appeal to children, and through the new medium of the magic lantern show, shown to audiences in church halls throughout the country.

Scottish foreign missionary work was mainly undertaken by small, local organisations that were often inter-denominational. The most important was the Edinburgh Missionary Society (EMS, later the Scottish Missionary Society, SMS) and the Glasgow Missionary Society (GMS). Both societies began their work in Sierra Leone in 1797, but the efforts failed and were rapidly abandoned. The societies then worked as associated societies of the London Missionary Society (LMS), through which most Scottish missionaries would be sponsored until the mid-nineteenth century. Scottish missionaries sponsored by the LMS included Robert Moffat (1795–1883). He arrived in Cape Colony in 1817, later to be joined by his wife Mary, and where he worked with Dutch Reformed minister George Thom. The GMS did not resume its direct work abroad until the 1820s after a visit from Thom built up their enthusiasm. They dispatched several missionaries to the Cape, including John Ross (1799–78), the first minister set apart for foreign missionary work by the Church of Scotland, who arrived in 1823. They joined John Brownlee (1791–1871), a Scottish missionary of the LMS, who had founded a station at Tyhume. Ross founded another, later known as Lovedale.

The most famous Scottish missionary, David Livingstone, was funded by the London Missionary Society. After his "disappearance" and death in the 1870s he became an icon of evangelic outreach, self-improvement, exploration and a form of colonialism. The legacy of Livingstone can be seen in the names of many mission stations founded following his example, such as Blantyre (the place of Livingstone's birth) for the Church of Scotland and Livingstonia, headed for more than fifty years by Robert Laws (1851–1934) for the Free Church, both now in Malawi.

Women also played a major role. Initially this was as the wives of male missionaries, as was the case with Mary Moffat, the daughter of Mary and Robert Moffat, who married Livingstone in 1845. Increasingly single women began to act as missionaries in their own right, often as teachers. Former Millworker Mary Slessor (1848–1919) spent 28 years as a United Presbyterian missionary in Calabar in modern Nigeria. Arriving in 1876, she combated cruelty and superstition, earning the title of Eka Kpukpro, Mother of All the Tribes.

In India Alexander Duff (1806–78), who arrived in Calcutta in 1830, played a major part in the development of higher education and the conversion of higher caste Indians. After the Great Disruption many of the staff from the established Church of Scotland's India mission joined the Free Church. Patrick Manson (1844–1922), who worked in China, is considered by many to be the father of modern tropical medicine. In Japan Scottish missionaries enjoyed some success and Henry Faulds (1843–1930) helped implement major advances in medicine under the Meiji. Members of the Free Church became associated with the colonisation of New Zealand: the Free Church offshoot the Otago Association sent out emigrants in 1847 who established the New Edinburgh or Otago settlement in 1848.

== Decline and revivals ==
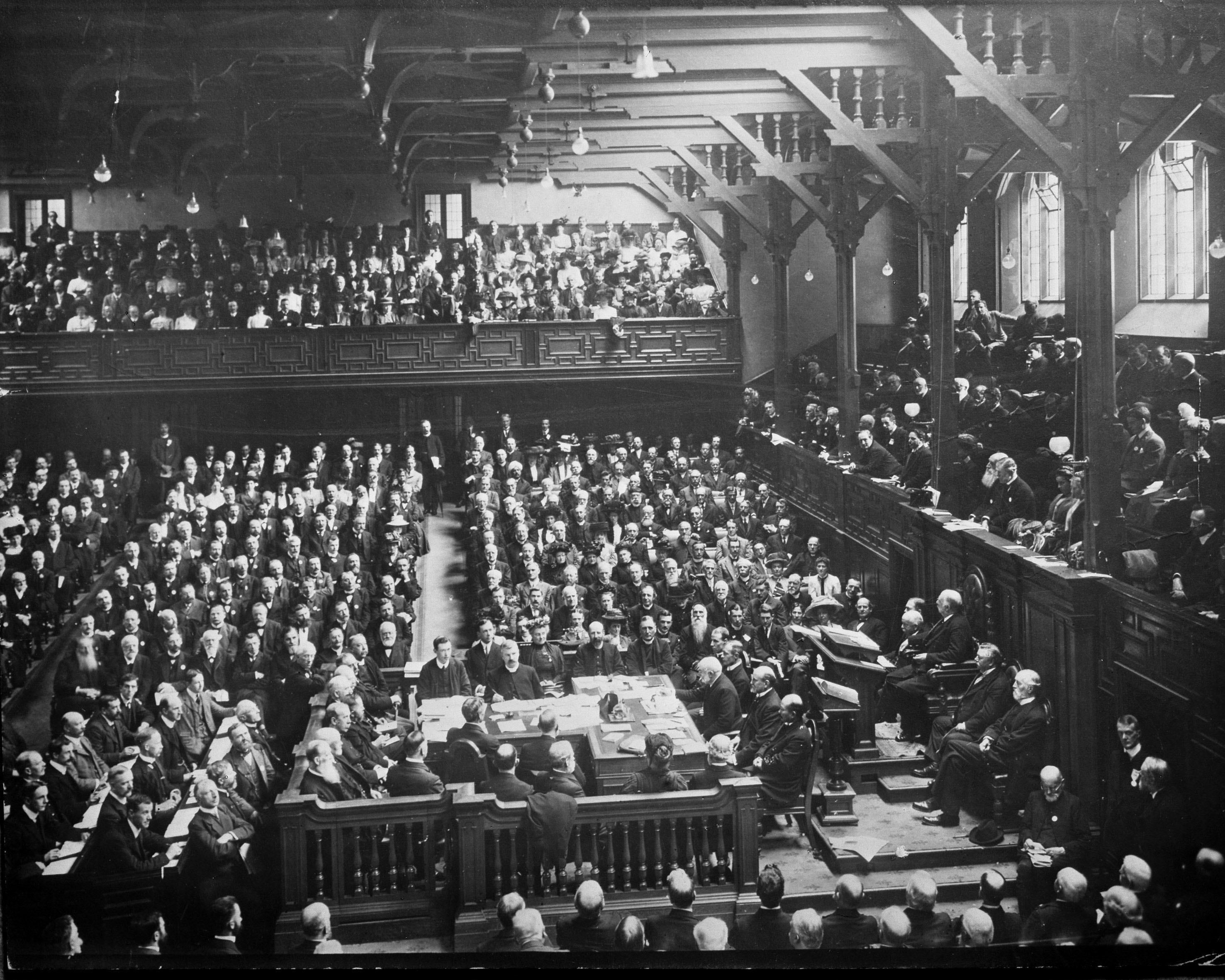
The 1910 World Missionary Conference, Edinburgh

The Evangelical effort began to decline in intensity in the final decades of the nineteenth century, both in Scotland and in major cities throughout the UK. There began to shortages of volunteers and funds for a large number of organisations. Reasons for this transformation that have been advanced include changes in leisure habits, the rise of socialism and the Labour movement, loss of middle class certainty about the validity of the gospel and its imposition on the working class as a solution to social ills. The migration of the middle classes away from inner city areas to newly built suburbs also removed them from contact with the working classes and a loss of willingness to engage in the Evangelical project, particularly the new petite bourgeoisie of white collar workers and tradesmen. As a result, urban religion became dominated by the working classes themselves, with new proletarian organisations such as the United Evangelistic Associations of Glasgow and Dundee, the United Working Men's Christian Mission, the Protestant Missionary Society of Glasgow, the Salvation Army and the various temperance societies. The Faith Mission was founded in 1886 and sponsored "pilgrims" who went wherever they were invited. The imposition of Evangelical religion above also began to be rejected by the working classes themselves, who began to resist attendance at organised events and visitations.

In the early twentieth century the focus of the churches began to broaden to include social problems. In 1900 the inter-denominational Scottish Christian Social Union was formed. In 1904 the Church of Scotland established a Social Work Committee under David Watson and the United Free Church a Social Problems Committee. Rather than focusing on the salvation and self-improvement of the working classes, they looked to help with issues of child welfare, slum housing and unemployment.

In 1910 the World Missionary Conference held in Edinburgh, has been seen as the culmination of nineteenth-century Protestant Christian missions and the formal beginning of the modern Protestant Christian ecumenical movement. The foreign missionary drive began to decline after the First World War, although the Church of Scotland continued to attach importance to its missionary efforts. The aim of most presbyterian missions was to establish self-supporting, self-governing and self-propagating churches, however, they were sometimes reluctant to release land and control. A number of native Christians, broke away to form their own independent "Ethiopian Churches", distinct from white dominated missions. This persuaded many missionaries of the need for distinct Presbyteries, still linked to white dominated denominations and missions. Among the first was the Bantu Presbyterian Church in 1929, which late became the Reformed Presbyterian Church in Southern Africa. Most missionaries were relatively positive about political independence and de-colonisation in the twentieth century, in contrast to many in their parent churches at home. Most of the imperial aspects of the foreign missionary project had gone by the 1950s and humanitarian efforts began to be more significant.

The Scottish denominations tended to continue to treat the Highlands and Islands as in need of special missionary attention into the twentieth century, with the Church of Scotland maintaining missions in the Islands until the 1960s. However, as the region became more bi-lingual and integrated into southern Scottish culture, the need for separate structures reduced and Highland agencies were gradually integrated into larger denominational structures. The Baptist Home Missionary Society of Scotland became part of the Baptist Union of Scotland in 1931 and the Home Mission Committee was abolished altogether in 1971.

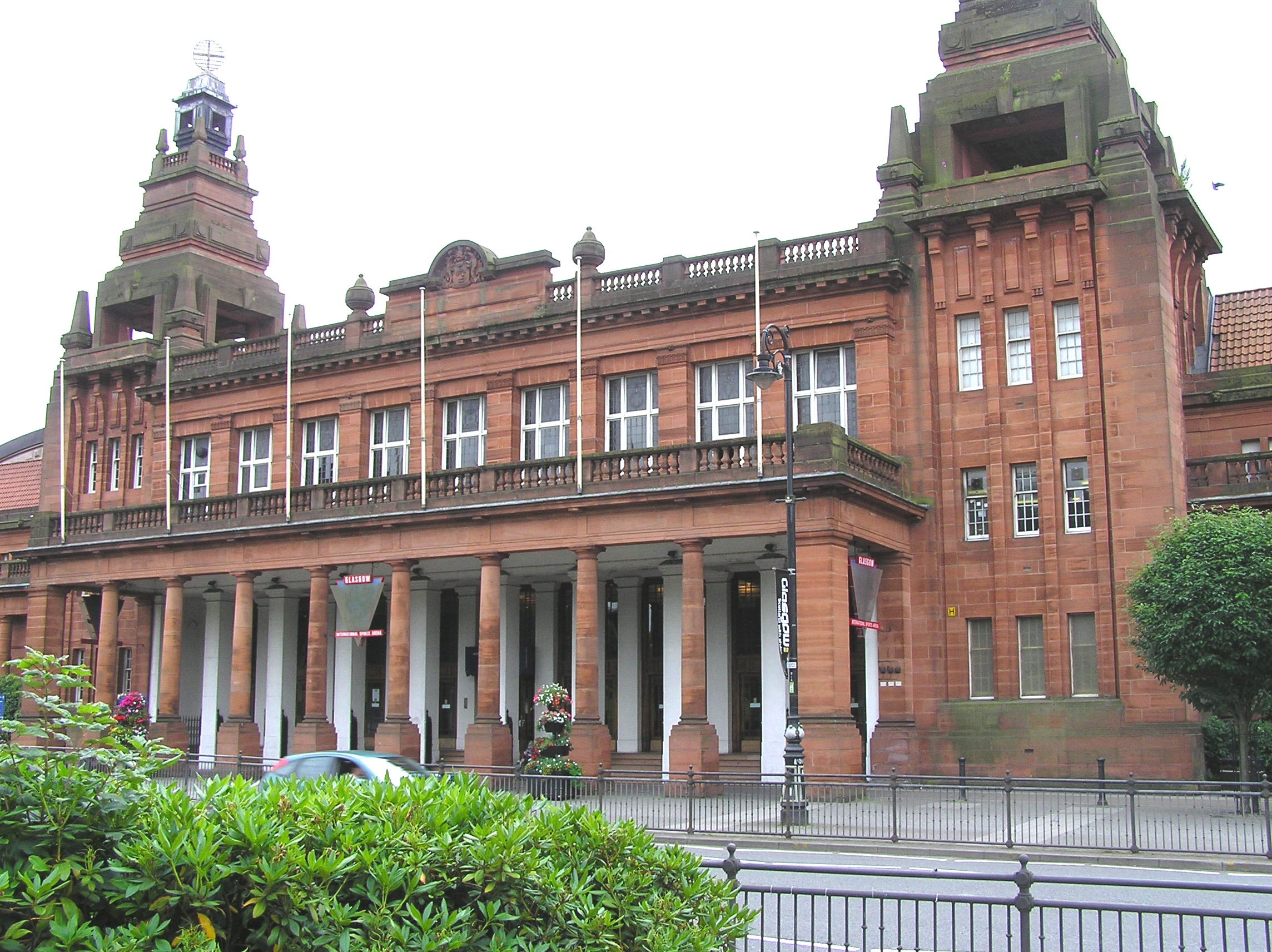
Kelvin Hall, Glasgow, the site of the climax of the 1955 Billy Graham Crusade

Despite declining church attendances Evangelical missions continued in Scotland into the twentieth century. There were a series of initiatives connected with the re-united Church of Scotland between 1947 and 1956. These included "Christian Commandos" and the "Radio Missions" of 1950–52 using BBC Scotland. The Herbridean revival of 1949–53 was initiated by the preaching of Faith Mission evangelist Duncan Campbell (1898–1972). The Tell Scotland Movement (1953–66), associated with Tom Allan and D. P. Thomson, resulted in the controversial 1955 Billy Graham All-Scotland Crusade, climaxing at the meeting in Glasgow's Kelvin Hall. Six weeks around Easter 1955 saw nightly mass rallies of 10,000 people packing Kelvin Hall and for two weeks others attended churches and halls throughout the country. The final event at Hampden Park attracted just under 100,000 people. All this was accompanied by extensive press and broadcasting coverage and a return to visitation on a scale not seen since the nineteenth century. The success was great enough to arrest the decline in church attendance, which returned to almost pre-war levels. However, the effects were short-lived. Church attendance began to decline rapidly in the 1960s, resulting in an "apparent loss of nerve" and a decline in home mission activity. Among the most effective of the organisations of the late twentieth century was the Scripture Union, which published Bible notes and scripture texts for children, organising meetings inside and outside of school. Most evangelism was now left to local congregations and it was much reduced in scale from the major efforts of the previous century.

By the twenty-first century the increasingly secularised Scotland became the subject of a number of "reverse missions" from countries that Europeans and North Americans had originally evangelised and which now attempted to restore or support Christianity in western countries. These include the Redeemed Christian Church of God, founded in Nigeria in 1952, who opened the Open Heaven parish in Edinburgh in 2003, and the Heart for the City project in Glasgow, founded by Lucas Njenga, which combined evangelism with concern for social renewal. However, most of their recruits have been immigrants of African origin.
