= George MacLeod =

Scottish soldier and cleric (1895–1991)

The Very Reverend Captain The Lord MacLeod of Fuinary Bt MC
- Moderator of the General Assembly
- Church: Church of Scotland
- In office: 1957 to 1958
- Predecessor: Robert Scott
- Successor: John Fraser
- Other post: Leader of the Iona Community (1938–1967)

Orders
- Ordination: 1924

Personal details
- Born: George Fielden MacLeod; 17 June 1895
- Died: 27 June 1991 (aged 96)
- Denomination: Presbyterianism
- Education: Winchester College
- Alma mater: Oriel College, Oxford; University of Edinburgh; Union Theological Seminary, New York
- Military career
- Service: British Army
- Service years: 1914–1918
- Rank: Captain
- Unit: Argyll and Sutherland Highlanders
- Conflicts: World War I
- Awards: Military Cross; Croix de Guerre (France)

George Fielden MacLeod, Baron MacLeod of Fuinary, Bt, MC (17 June 1895 – 27 June 1991) was a Scottish soldier and clergyman; he was one of the best known, most influential and unconventional Church of Scotland ministers of the 20th century. He was the founder of the Iona Community on the island of Iona and served as Moderator of the General Assembly of the Church of Scotland (1957).

== Early life ==
He was born in Glasgow in 1895. His father (Sir John MacLeod) was a successful businessman before entering politics as a Unionist MP; his mother Edith was from a wealthy Lancastrian family (owning cotton mills). From this background and heir to a baronetcy, George MacLeod was educated at Winchester College and Oriel College, Oxford. His paternal grandfather was the highly respected Revd Norman MacLeod of the Barony Church, Glasgow, a Moderator of the General Assembly of the Church of Scotland and Chaplain to Queen Victoria.

== First World War service ==
Upon the outbreak of the First World War, and having been a cadet in the Officers Training Corps, MacLeod was commissioned in the Argyll and Sutherland Highlanders, British Army, as a temporary second lieutenant on 19 September 1914. He first saw active service in Greece. After falling ill with dysentery, he was sent back to Scotland to recuperate, after which he was posted to Flanders. On 24 June 1917, he was made an adjutant and promoted to acting captain. He saw action at Ypres and Passchendaele. He was awarded the Military Cross (MC) in October 1917, and the French Croix de Guerre with palm for bravery in 1918.

T./Lt. George Fielden MacLeod, Arg. & Suth'd Highrs.
For conspicuous gallantry and devotion to duty as adjutant, volunteering to go out and do duty in the hastily-organised line of defence when no company officers remained. He carried out his duties as adjutant as well, and was of the greatest assistance in keeping cohesion.

— Military Cross citation in The London Gazette

== Ministry ==
His experience of this total war profoundly affected MacLeod, leading him to train for the ministry. He studied divinity at the University of Edinburgh, followed by a year at Union Theological Seminary, New York City (1921-1922). Upon return to Scotland he was invited to become Assistant at St Giles' Cathedral. During this period he became increasingly concerned over the issue of social inequality in Scotland. In 1924 he was ordained as a Church of Scotland minister, to be Padre of Toc H (Talbot House) in Scotland. Such non-parochial appointments were extremely unusual at the time. Following a disagreement, he resigned from Toc H in 1926, but was invited to become associate minister at St Cuthbert's Church, Edinburgh.

His wartime experiences, combined with a profound disillusionment by post-World War I political rhetoric of "a land fit for heroes," deeply affected him. Confronted by the realities of the depression and unemployment faced by those less privileged than he, MacLeod gradually moved towards supporting socialism and pacifism. From 1937 he became actively involved with the Peace Pledge Union (PPU), and from 1958 with the Campaign for Nuclear Disarmament (CND).

Meanwhile, in 1930, to considerable surprise, he decided to leave St Cuthbert's Church to become minister at Govan Old Parish Church—encountering the considerable social problems caused by poverty in this part of Glasgow. The pace of work took its toll and in 1932 he suffered a breakdown. He spent some time recuperating in Jerusalem in early 1933. While worshipping in an Eastern Orthodox Church on Easter Day he felt a profound spiritual experience, feeling a sense of recovery of the Church as the corporate Body of Christ. This would strongly influence the rest of his life.

He resigned (giving up the financial security of a parish minister's stipend) to become the full-time leader of the Iona Community, which he founded in 1938. His efforts started in the early 1930s when he bought Fingleton Mill as a refuge for Glasgow's poor. The idea of rebuilding Iona Abbey using ministers, students and unemployed labourers working together influenced his thinking; the Iona Community developed as an international ecumenical community, with offices in Govan and a presence on the island of Iona. Underpinning the fellowship of the Community were four emphases: mission, political involvement, a ministry of healing, and worship, by which MacLeod and the Community sought a way to connect the Church with an industrial age. He led a series of parish missions (sometimes known as a 'Message of Friendship') in Scottish parishes associated with the Community, and supported the 1950 Glasgow Churches' Campaign and the 1950s Tell Scotland Movement. However, he opposed the invitation promoted by Rev. Tom Allan to Dr Billy Graham that led to the 1955 All-Scotland Crusade.

== Global policy ==
He was one of the signatories of the agreement to convene a convention for drafting a world constitution. As a result, for the first time in human history, a World Constituent Assembly convened to draft and adopt the Constitution for the Federation of Earth.

== Later life ==
During World War II, he served as locum minister at Canongate Kirk in Edinburgh—a parish also then afflicted by poverty.

In 1948 (aged 53) he married Lorna; immediately after the wedding they travelled to Australia for a preaching tour. The 1940s and early 1950s were a difficult period professionally. MacLeod was involved in what became known as the "Govan Case." He was invited by the congregation to return to Govan Old Parish Church in 1948, but the Presbytery of Glasgow refused to approve his appointment, given his wish to continue his active leadership of the Iona Community. The case was referred to the General Assembly; ultimately he was refused permission to combine the two posts.

Despite a feeling of hurt and rejection over the "Govan Case", MacLeod remained one of the highest-profile figures in the Church of Scotland. In 1957 he was elected Moderator of the General Assembly of the Church of Scotland, following one Commissioner standing up and asking whether it was appropriate that a man who had been described as being "half way to Rome and half way to Moscow" should be Moderator.

On 6 February 1967, MacLeod was awarded a peerage, becoming Baron MacLeod of Fuinary, of Fuinary in Morven in the County of Argyll; the only Church of Scotland minister to have been thus honoured. He was introduced to the House on 15 February 1967. He later became the first peer to represent the Green Party.

From 1968 to 1971, he was Rector of the University of Glasgow. The rector is one of the most senior posts at the University of Glasgow and is elected by the students.

George MacLeod's influence on the Church of Scotland was considerable. His initial emphasis on parish mission was generally welcomed and favourably compared to the campaigns of his contemporary, D.P. Thomson. Although dismissed by some as a maverick, he helped to raise awareness of pacificism, ecumenism and social justice issues, and inspired many to become involved with such questions. Through the creation of the Iona Community, he was a pioneer of new forms of ministry (outside more conventional parish or chaplaincy structures).

In 1989 MacLeod received the Templeton Prize.

== Arms ==
Coat of arms of George MacLeod
Crest A Bull's Head cabossed Sable horned Or between two Keys wards uppermost of the last Escutcheon Azure a Castle triple-towered Argent masoned Sable windows and Portcullis Gules on a Chief of the second an Open Book proper leaved of the fourth Motto Hold Fast

Academic offices
Preceded by The Lord Reith	Rector of the University of Glasgow; 1968–1971	Succeeded by Jimmy Reid
Baronetage of the United Kingdom
Preceded by Ian MacLeod	Baronet (of Fuinary); 1944–1991	Succeeded by John MacLeod
