= John Fraser (minister) =

John Annand Fraser, MBE, TD was Moderator of the General Assembly of the Church of Scotland from 1958 to 1959.
He was born into a clerical family on 21 June 1894 and educated at Robert Gordon's College, Inverness Royal Academy and the Universities of Aberdeen and Edinburgh. During The Great War he served with the Gordon Highlanders.

Ordained in 1921, he was initially an Assistant Minister at St Matthew's, Edinburgh, 1921. After this he held incumbencies at Humbie and Hamilton, during which time he was the Moderator and his son, later Sir Charles Annand Fraser, attended the Hamilton Academy. From 1960 to 1970 he was Minister of Aberdalgie. He died on 3 October 1985.

Religious titles
Preceded by George MacLeod	Moderator of the General Assembly of the Church of Scotland; 1958–1959	Succeeded by Robert Henry Wishart Shepherd
