= Charles Fraser (businessman) =

Scottish businessman (born 1928)

- Born: 16 October 1928 (age 97)
- Education: MA and LLB
- Alma mater: University of Edinburgh
- Occupation: Businessman

Sir Charles Annand Fraser KCVO WS DL FRSE (born 16 October 1928) is a Scottish businessman and former Chairman, Lothian and Borders Enterprise, Scottish Enterprise network.

== Early life ==
The son of the Very Revd John Fraser MBE who was Moderator of the General Assembly of the Church of Scotland 1958–59, Charles Annand Fraser was born on 16 October 1928 at Humbie in East Lothian, Scotland, and educated at the former Hamilton Academy. His father was at that time Minister at Hamilton Old Parish Church. Charles Fraser was to continue his studies at the University of Edinburgh, graduating MA and LLB.

== Business career ==
A partner (1965 to 1992) in the Edinburgh solicitors W. & J. Burness WS, Fraser is a former director of British Assets Trust PLC; Scottish Media Group (formerly Scottish Television PLC); Scottish Business in the Community and Stakis PLC. He was also non-executive Vice-Chairman of United Biscuits (Holdings) between 1986 and 1995 and Chairman of the banks Morgan Grenfell (Scotland) and Adam and Company. Fraser has also served as a director of the Scottish Widows Fund, (1978–94).

== Other appointments ==
From 1966 to 1972 Fraser served as a member of the Council of the Law Society of Scotland, and from 1969 to 1988, as Purse Bearer to the Lord High Commissioner to the General Assembly of the Church of Scotland, serving also, from 1972 to 1978, on the Court of Heriot-Watt University.

In 1991, Fraser was appointed Chairman of Lothian & Edinburgh Enterprise, part of the Scottish Enterprise network, a post he held until 1994, from which year, to 1997, he served as Chairman of the Secretary of State for Scotland's Advisory Committee on Sustainable Development. From 1997 to 2000, Fraser was also a Trustee of the World Wildlife Fund (UK).

== Honours ==
Charles Annand Fraser was appointed LVO in 1968; CVO in 1985 and knighted, as KCVO in 1989. He was also appointed a Deputy Lieutenant for East Lothian in 1984 and elected a Fellow of the Royal Society of Edinburgh in 1993.
