= St Ninian's Centre, Crieff =

St Ninian's Centre
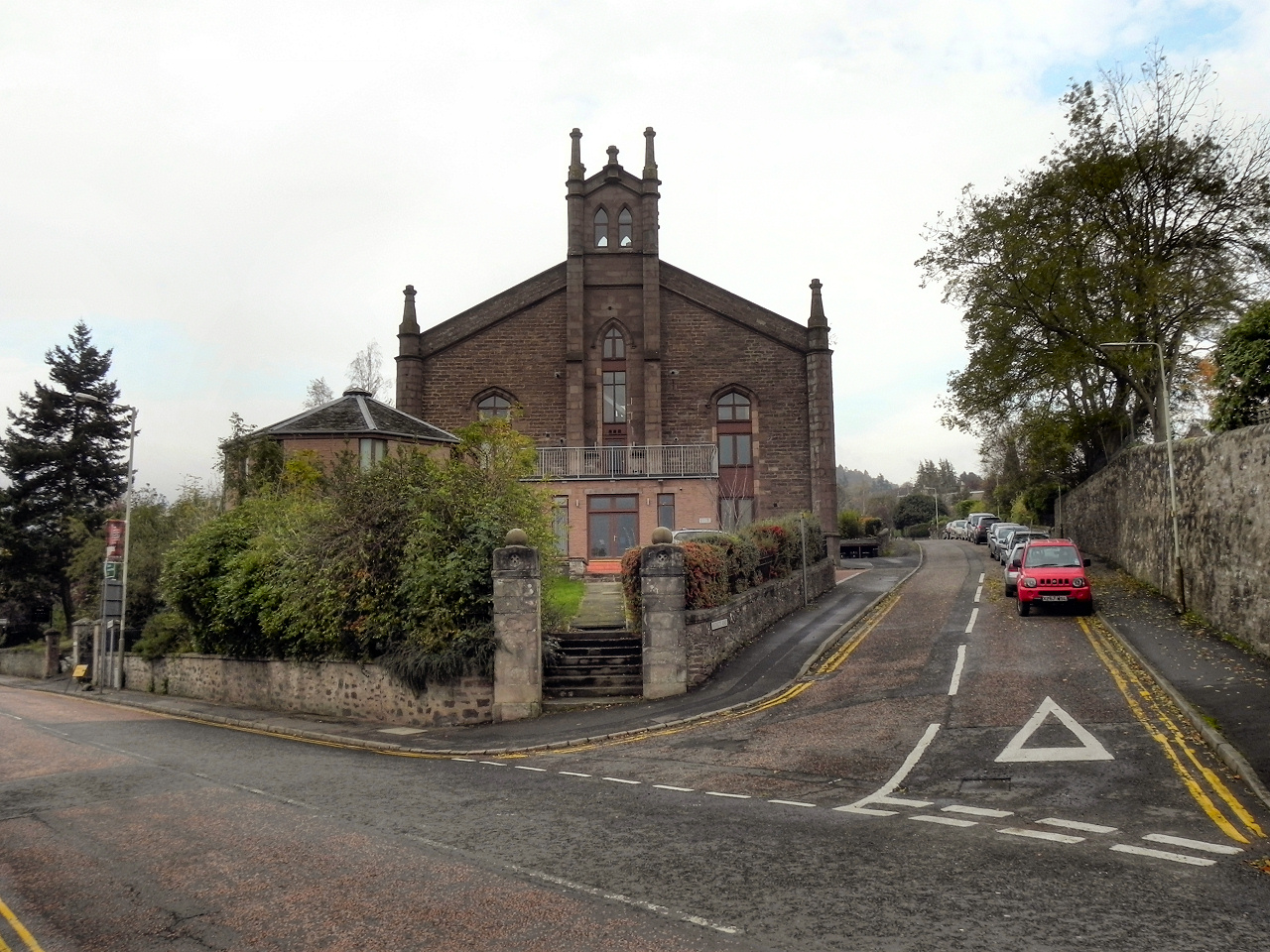
- St Ninian's Centre

- Location of the St Ninian's Centre in Perth and Kinross
- 56.375304°N 3.84397°W
- Location: Comrie Road, Crieff
- Country: Scotland
- Denomination: Former Church of Scotland

History
- Former name: Crieff West Parish Church
- Status: Former church
- Dedication: St. Ninian
- Events: 1958: converted to conference centre; 2002: conference centre closed

Architecture
- Functional status: Private flats conversion
- Style: Gothic Revival
- Years built: 1837-8
- Closed: 1958

Specifications
- Materials: Sandstone

The St Ninian's Centre (1960–2001) was a conference centre owned by the Church of Scotland which was located in Crieff, Perthshire, Scotland. It was converted from the former Crieff West Parish Church (Crieff West and Crieff North Parish Churches had united in 1957) and was extensively used for over 50 years as a training and conference venue by church groups, for both day visits and residential events. It closed in the 2000s and has since been converted to private flats.

== History ==
Crieff West Parish Church was built 1837-8 on the corner of Comrie Road and Heathcote Road as a chapel of ease to the older Crieff (East) Parish Church, which stands on Strathearn Terrace. The Crieff Parish lay within the Presbytery of Auchterarder. In 1864 the status of the church was raised to a quoad sacra parish.

The building was converted for use as a lay training centre and was officially opened in 1958 by the evangelical Church of Scotland minister D. P. Thomson. It was extensively used for over 50 years as a training and conference venue by church groups, for both day visits and residential events.

By the 1990s use of the centre was declining and the facilities were in need of modernisation. In 2000 the Church of Scotland's Board of National Mission proposed the closure of the centre. After some disagreement at the General Assembly, a Special Commission was set up to explore future use of the building, including continued use of the building as a Christian conference centre, but these proposal were not successful. In 2001 the General Assembly authorized the closure of St Ninian's. Planning permission was then sought for a change of use, and the building was sold off and converted into private flats, which today are rented out as holiday accommodation.

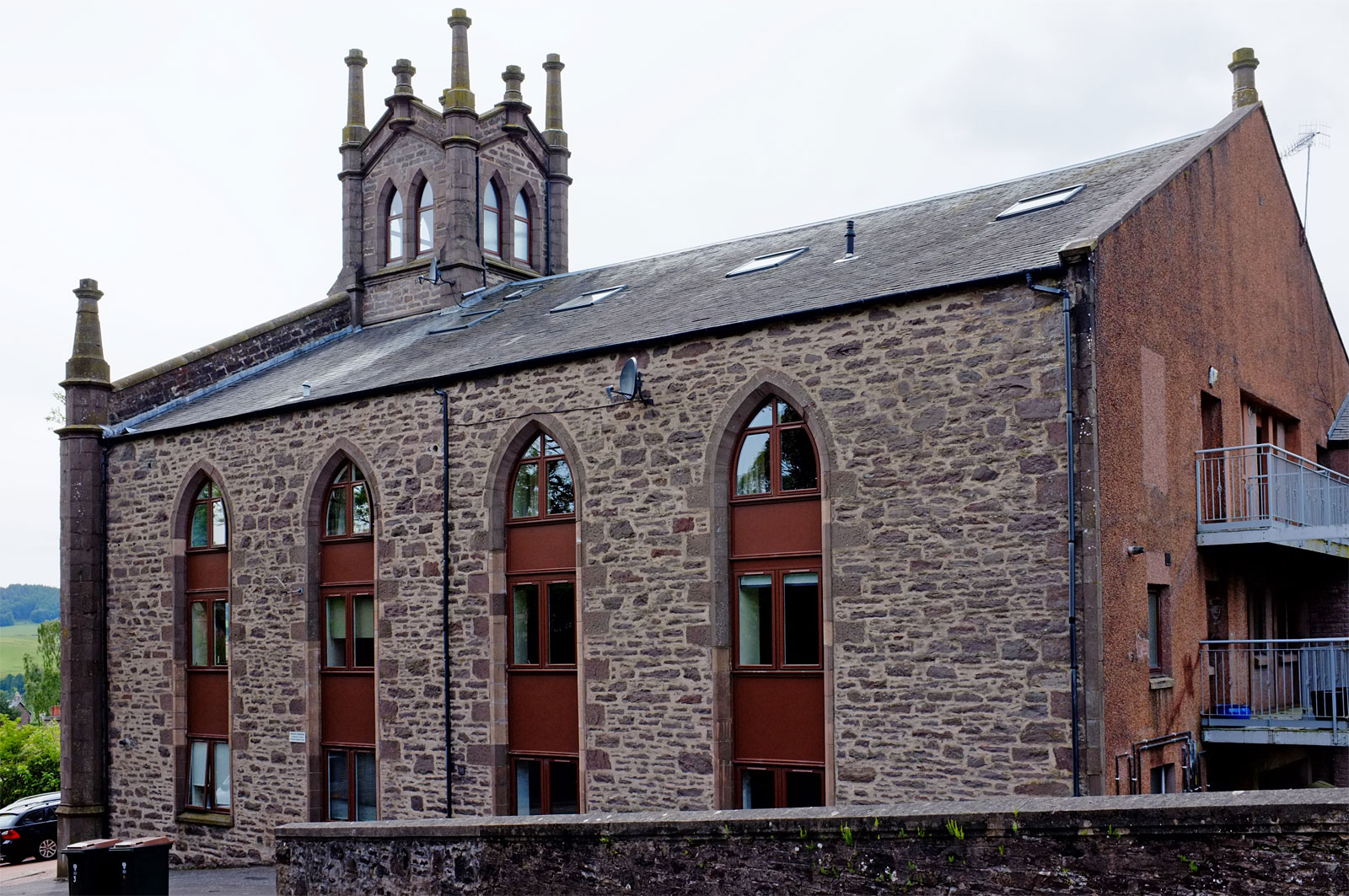
St Ninian's Centre following conversion to apartments

== Architecture ==
The church was designed by the Scottish architect Thomas Lennox Watson in an early Gothic Revival style fronted with ashlar stone. The centrepiece of the front gable end is a bell tower and the corners are topped with Gothic pinnacles. Around 1925, additional church furnishings were installed by the designer Robert Lorimer. After conversion to a training centre, alterations to the building were carried out in 1960 by the architects Finlayson & Campbell. In 1982, a stone-clad flat-roofed porch was added to the front and an octagonal chapel built on the south-west side.
