= Tell Scotland Movement =

The Tell Scotland Movement (1953-1966) was the most extensive and ambitious attempt at outreach by the Protestant Churches in Scotland in the twentieth century. At the time, together with its associated All-Scotland Crusade, led by Dr Billy Graham, it generated considerable energies, publicity and controversy. In 1964 Tell Scotland became a founding part of the Scottish Churches Council, within the ecumenical movement. Commentators since have had varied views about the extents to which Tell Scotland succeeded or failed.

== Background ==
The Union in 1929 of the established Church in Scotland with the United Free Church of Scotland to create the Church of Scotland was viewed as an opportunity to reach what were called “the churchless million” by a more effective and efficient system of parishes. The Call to the Church of the Forward Movement of 1930-31, however, struggled for attention during the Great Depression.

Rev. George MacLeod argued during the inter-war years "Are not the churchless million partly the Church's fault" and sought to address this by better connections between congregations and their immediate areas, by organizing ministers in teams, and by demonstrating concern for wider society. A "mission of friendship" in his Govan Old Parish Church brought in impressive numbers of new worshippers. The Iona Community was born out of MacLeod's pastoral experience and missionary concerns.

1937-39 saw the Scottish churches collaborate in their own version of the "Recall to Religion" first promoted by archbishop of Canterbury Cosmo Gordon Lang who commended the way the "Recall" was taken up in Scotland. George MacLeod was one of twelve Ministerial Evangelists acknowledged by the General Assembly of 1938 to support the Recall. By 1939 it was possible to speak of a socially-aware "new evangelism" being practiced: "The development has been away from the large meeting and toward more intensive work among people in their homes and places of work," and on a more cooperative basis between denominations.

This emphasis on congregationally-centred outreach, enabling the mission of the laity, was affirmed during the Second World War by the "Baillie Commission", the Church of Scotland's General Assembly's "Commission for the Interpretation of God's Will in the Present Crisis," convened by the Very Rev. Prof. John Baillie, which reported to the Assembly 1941 to 1945.

== Immediate origins ==
During, and in the years immediately after the Second World War, as Leader of the Iona Community George MacLeod led a series of parish missions and supported the creation of new congregations in post-war housing schemes through the Church Extension movement.

On behalf of the Home Board of the Church of Scotland, D.P. Thomson led a series of visitation evangelism campaigns; that in 1947 in North Kelvinside, the parish of Rev. Tom Allan was widely publicized, while the "Mid-Century Campaign" in Paisley, unusually, lasted an entire year, March 1950 to April 1951.

Other major evangelistic campaigns organized in Scotland in this period were the "Commando Campaigns" in both Edinburgh and Glasgow of 1950, and the "Radio Missions" organized by BBC Scotland in 1950 and 1952.

== Principles and organization ==
Developing directly from planning for a third Radio Mission, the Tell Scotland Movement came under the direction of a committee supported by the Baptist Union of Scotland, the Church of Scotland, the Churches of Christ in Scotland, the Congregational Union of Scotland, the Methodist Synod in Scotland, the Iona Community, the Scottish Episcopal Church, the United Free Church of Scotland, and the United Original Secession denomination.

Direction Direction of the Movement came from a larger Parent Committee, with a smaller executive meeting as the Steering Panel. Rev. William A. Smellie, convener of the Church of Scotland's Home Board, chaired both Tell Scotland groups. Ronnie Falconer of BBC Scotland was secretary of the Steering Panel; other executive members were David Read (chaplain of Edinburgh University), Charles Duthie (Principal of the Scottish Congregational College), Edward Campbell of the Baptist Union, Charles Anderson of the Episcopal Church, Elizabeth Wardlaw of the United Free Church, Horace Walker and Roddie Smith of the Church of Scotland, and Ralph Morton, Deputy Leader of the Iona Community. Rev. Tom Allan was appointed full-time Field Organizer.

Motivation At a press conference to launch the Movement in 1953, the Movement explained its motivation: "Mission must be the constant activity of the Church in love and obedience to her Lord. The urgency of the Church's missionary task is being brought home to us in several ways: (i) We are recognising the inadequacy of traditional methods of evangelism. (ii) We are conscious of the apparent failure of the conventional life of the Church to respond in compassion to the needs of the world. (iii) We are convinced that the only word for a bankrupt world is the Word of the Church's Lord."

Principles Three general principles were agreed to underpin the Movement: (1) "The key to evangelism lay with the parish or local congregation. Mission was not something added to the Church's life but was one part of the Church's witness. (2) Effective mission was not an occasional or sporadic effort but was a continuous pattern of life within the local Church. (3) Whatever the method of mission, the layman had a vital and strategic part to play."

Planning Three phases were planned: (1) Motivation (mission to ministers and office-bearers) September 1953 to June 1954; (2) Recruitment and training of the laity (mission to congregations) September 1954 to June 1955; (3) Outgoing mission to the community, beginning September 1955. No end date was set, as Tell Scotland was conceived as an ongoing movement, not a one-off campaign. Tom Allan explained the central part expected to be played by congregations in his pamphlets: The Agent of Mission and The Congregational Group in Action, and he recommended to the Movement James Maitland's Iona Community pamphlet, Caring for People with its call to care for "the aged and infirm, the sick, the destitute; the involvement with the critical political issues of the times".

== The All-Scotland Crusade ==
The success of Dr Billy Graham's 1954 crusade in Harringay, London, then brought demands, unexpected when Tell Scotland began, that an invitation be issued to him to lead a campaign in Scotland. Despite the opposition of George MacLeod, the Movement's Parent Committee itself invited Graham to lead a campaign in Glasgow in spring 1955, to be extended to the whole country as an "All-Scotland Crusade" by the telephone relay system. Tom Allan justified the addition of the Crusade to phase two of Tell Scotland, and the commitment of the Movement to cooperate with the Crusade, by suggesting that such a series of rallies would better prepare congregations for their phase three task of outreach. George MacLeod, to the contrary, feared that a traditional rally-based professional Crusade would fatally undermine the congregational emphasis of Tell Scotland.

With Tom Allan as chairman of its executive committee, the All Scotland Crusade, sponsored by Tell Scotland in cooperation with the Billy Graham Organization, was held during March and April 1955. Large numbers of people attended Billy Graham's sermons in Glasgow's Kelvin Hall and watched the BBC's broadcasts from the Crusade. Initial reports were highly positive: Tom Allan claimed that "a total of 1,185,360 people in Scotland attended meetings of one kind or another."

== The Outgoing movement ==
Congregations across Scotland took up the challenge of the third, out-going, phase of Tell Scotland. By summer 1956, the General Assembly of the Church of Scotland heard that "There is hardly a part of Scotland where there has been no evangelistic activity ... some 600 campaigns of house to house visitation have been carried through". These were often arranged on an inter-denominational basis.

After a citywide visitation of Edinburgh, 1955–56, the Church of Scotland Presbytery concluded that "The year of parochial evangelism shows many more people added to the Church than the year of mass evangelism".

At the invitation of local presbyteries and congregations, D.P. Thomson led campaigns under the Tell Scotland brand in Sutherland (1955), Mull, Ross-shire and Orkney (1956) and Shetland (1957). In 1958 he cooperated with Tom Allan in the Glasgow Central Churches Campaign.

Rev. Tom Allan had resigned as the Movement's Field Organiser in the autumn of 1955 and accepted a call to the Glasgow city-centre parish of St George's-Tron Church.

== The final phase ==
A second chapter of Tell Scotland's life ran from 1957 to 1966, during which the Movement supported two branches of work. Under Allan's successor, Rev. Ian Mactaggart, Field Organiser 1955-1960, further parish missions were encouraged. In addition Rev. Colin Day was appointed to lead a series of national "Kirk Week" events, large-scale conferences to encourage the laity to think through the implications of their faith for the worlds of home and work.

In 1957, an administrative reorganisation created a governing Committee with an Executive and four Commissions: on Evangelism, on the Bible, on the Community and on the Laity. These published study pamphlets. When Mactaggart left office, a 50-strong Panel of "Missioners" held discussions but were unable to agree any new national mission or project.

By 1961 widespread disappointment with the Movement was being reported.

In 1964 the Movement's structures became the Department of Mission of the new Scottish Council of Churches and the name was dropped in 1966.

The Tell Scotland Archive is held (2014) at New College Library, The University of Edinburgh.

== Publications associated with the Tell Scotland Movement ==
=== 1953–55 ===
- Stewart, James S. (1953) A Faith to Proclaim London: Hodder & Stoughton (recommended by the Steering Panel)
- Stewart, James S. (1953) The Missionary Church Glasgow: Tell Scotland.
- Morton, T. Ralph (1954) Evangelism in Scotland Today Glasgow: Tell Scotland.
- [no author credited] (1954) Strategy for Mission Glasgow: Tell Scotland.
- Hunter, A.M. (1954) Interpreting Paul's Gospel London (recommended by Tom Allan)
- Maitland, James (1954) Caring for People: The Church in the Parish Glasgow: The Iona Community (recommended by Tom Allan)
- Allan, Tom (1954) The Agent of Mission: the lay group in evangelism, its significance and its tasks Glasgow: Tell Scotland.
- Allan, Tom (1955) The Congregational Group in Action. Glasgow: Tell Scotland.

=== 1955 ===
- Thomson, D.P. (ed.) (1955) We Saw The Church In Action! The Press and BBC report on those visitation campaigns 1947 to 1954, Crieff.
- Thomson, D.P. (1955) Guidance For Those Engaged In House-To-House Visitation Campaigns, Crieff.
- Thomson, D.P. (prepared by) (1955), New Testament Conversions. A Question Course Handbook For Preachers, Teachers, Personal Workers and Counsellors And Bible Study Groups, Crieff.
- Thomson, D.P. (ed.) (1955) Two by Two! The rank and file of the church report on what happened when they went out visiting, Crieff.
- Thomson (ed.) (1955) You Are Going Out Visiting? Let us tell you a little about it! By (1) Elders of the Kirk, (2) Women of the Guild, (3) The Young People Crieff.
- Thomson, D.P. (1955) The Road Ahead: A Word To Those Who Are Beginning The Christian Life Crieff.
- Thomson, D.P. (1955) A Pocket Guide For Personal Workers And Counsellors Engaged In After Meeting And Enquiry Room Work Crieff.
- Thomson, D.P. (1955) Visitation Campaigns: a study guide for congregational groups and youth fellowships Crieff.
- Thomson, D.P. (1955) Beginning The Christian Life: A First Month’s Daily Bible Reading From The New Testament For The Young Disciple Crieff.
- Allan, Tom (ed.) (1955) Crusade in Scotland ... Billy Graham London: Pickering & Inglis

=== 1956–59 ===
- Thomson, D.P. (1956) The Sutherland Adventure. The Tell Scotland Campaign In The Presbytery Of Tongue, August 1955 with Contributions By David Maxwell and Other Members Of The Team Crieff.
- Thomson, D.P. (1956) West Highland Adventure. The Tell Scotland Campaign In Mull And Iona, Coll And Tiree, Morvern And Ardnamurchan, Spring 1956 Crieff.
- Thomson, D.P. (prepared by) (1956) Epistle To The Philippians. A Four Week Question Course For ‘Tell Scotland’ Training Schools And Campaigns And For Preachers, Teachers, Bible Students And Bible Study Groups Crieff.
- Small, R. Leonard (1956) The Fellowship We Have to Share Edinburgh: The Saint Andrew Press.
- Thomson, D.P. (prepared by) (1956) The Parables Of Jesus. A Question Course For Preachers, Teachers, Bible Students And Bible Study Groups Crieff.
- Thomson, D.P. (1958) Harnessing The Lay Forces Of The Church. Experiences, Adventures And Discoveries In The Work Of Visitation Evangelism In Scotland, 1946-57 Crieff.
- Fraser, I. (1959) Bible, Congregation and Community SCM Press.

=== 1960 ===
- Mactaggart, I. (1960) After Five Years Glasgow: Scottish churches' Tell Scotland Movement pamphlet series 2; no. 1.
- The Commission on the Bible (G.S. Gunn) (1960) Truth in Action: The authority of the Bible for the mission of the Church Scottish Churches Tell Scotland Movement pamphlet series 2; no. 2.
- The Commission on the Laity (M. Dinwiddie) (1960) The Layman at Work Scottish Churches Tell Scotland Movement pamphlet series 2; no. 3.
- The Commission on the Community (I. Fraser) (1960) Calling You In Scottish Churches Tell Scotland Movement pamphlet series 2; no. 4.
- The Commission on Evangelism (M.E. Macdonald) (1960) The Lost Provinces Scottish Churches Tell Scotland Movement pamphlet series 2; no. 5.
- [no author given] (1960) Word and World Scottish Churches Tell Scotland Movement.
- Commission on the Laity, In the world : seven studies in Christian living today Glasgow: Scottish Churches Tell Scotland Movement (no date).

Also

- 1956-1968, Rally, Glasgow: an independent Christian journal commended by the Tell Scotland Steering Panel.

== Opinions ==
Commentary on the Tell Scotland Movement remains divided. In the years immediately after 1955, sociology lecturer John Highet of Glasgow University conducted surveys of opinion on the effectiveness of the evangelism of the Movement and the Crusade, and in 1960 reported sharply different views in a chapter entitled "To what end? An appraisal of effect".

Statistics show that Church of Scotland church membership peaked in 1956 and then dropped off in the years following.

- In 1966 D.P. Thomson concluded that visitation evangelism was more likely than mass or crusade evangelism to have enduring results.
- In 1978 Ronnie Falconer considered that "Billy's message was not really in touch with modern society" and that the Crusade's high visibility encouraged too many to say "Leave it all to Graham", avoiding the demands of local mission.
- In 1984 Rev. Prof. James Whyte regretted the intrusion of the Crusade, considering that it prevented congregationally-based outreach from developing.
- In 1986-7 Peter Bisset considered Tell Scotland as a whole "The most important movement of mission that Scotland had seen in the course of the century" and "A movement of mission scarcely paralleled in the record of the years".
- In 1989 D.W. Bebbington, writing more generally of the UK, concluded that "Billy Graham was reaching extensively beyond the middle classes" and that "he administered a powerful tonic".
- In 1990 Ron Ferguson considered that the invitation to invite Billy Graham fatally divided the leadership of the Movement, draining its energies.
- In 1997 Oliver Barclay credited the All-Scotland Crusade with "a very significant effect on Scottish church life" with a peak in Church of Scotland membership following it.
- In 1998 James Maitland remembered that the Movement "made its own positive contribution to the breakdown of denominational barriers throughout the country."
- In 2001 Callum G. Brown acknowledged that the numbers attending Tell Scotland-type events were vast and that they "had a powerful resonance to 1950s Britain". He argued that broader social trends resulted in "cultural traditionalism" crumbling in Britain in the 1960s.
- In 2008 Frank Bardgett suggested that inward looking congregations, ministerial inability to facilitate lay outreach, and the theological ignorance of the laity all hampered those interested either by the Crusade or by visitation evangelism from long-term integration with congregations.
