= Tom Allan (minister) =

British minister

Thomas (Tom) Allan

Personal life
- Born: 16 August 1916 Newmilns, Ayrshire, Scotland
- Died: 8 September 1965 (aged 49) Glasgow, Scotland
- Education: Glasgow University

Religious life
- Religion: Christian
- Denomination: Church of Scotland
- Church: Glasgow: North Kelvinside (1946-1953); Glasgow: St George’s Tron (1955-1964)

Senior posting
- Post: Field Organiser: The Tell Scotland Movement (1953-1955); Chair of Executive Committee, All-Scotland Crusade (1955)

Thomas (Tom) Allan (1916-1965) was a minister and evangelist of the Church of Scotland, broadcaster, author, columnist and pioneer of practical church outreach in social work, primarily in the city of Glasgow. His notable achievements were recognised with one of the city's highest honours, the St Mungo Prize in 1964.

== Ayrshire roots and studies ==
Tom Allan always cherished his Ayrshire roots. Born in Newmilns, he benefited from the rich music and singing traditions of the valleys and participation in the life of the local church. He also there met Jean Dunn from the same community and school. They were married in 1941. Allan completed a First Class Honours in English at Glasgow University in 1938.

== RAF service ==
When the Second World War began Allan left his exempted divinity studies and volunteered for service in the Royal Air Force. Eyesight faults prevented flying. He was sent for officer training and on to Intelligence work. 1945 saw him at Supreme Headquarters Allied Expeditionary Force in Reims and Frankfurt.

His war experience challenged his faith, and he became more agnostic and doubtful. That changed during an Easter Day service in war-ravaged Reims, when an African American soldier rose to sing the solo Were you there when they crucified my Lord? He was strongly affected by the experience, and it changed Allan's life.

He returned to home and family, to an intense year of study at the Department of Divinity in Glasgow University, winning the prize in New Testament studies and graduating M.A. in 1946. During this period as a mature student, he began a lengthy association with the Church of Scotland evangelist, D.P. Thomson, becoming a leader at the Seaside Missions Thomson organized after the war.

== North Kelvinside ==
Tom Allan was called to his first parish of Glasgow's North Kelvinside in 1946, an inner city area of mainly tenement buildings housing 10,000 people. Congregational membership increased from 487 to 611 in his first year.

In 1947 Allan issued an invitation to D.P. Thomson to conduct a visitation campaign in North Kelvinside. Volunteers from Seaside Mission teams and from the congregation visited all homes in the parish, speaking of faith in Christ and offering invitations to church. Thomson described the campaign in a leaflet: Visitation Evangelism. Public attention was caught and further increased when Allan published his own reflections in The Face of My Parish (1954) which led the World Council of Churches to invite him to join their Commission on Evangelism.

During Allan's seven year ministry, North Kelvinside's congregational membership grew towards 1,200. The emergence of a Congregational Group from all ages, sexes and backgrounds, committed to the work of evangelism, was central to Allan's ministry, offering training in prayer, bible study and application in Christian service. In The Face of My Parish, however, Allan described the divisive impact of the 1947 campaign and its aftermath and commentators since have picked up this point.

== Broadcasts ==
1947 also saw the beginning of Allan's involvement with first radio and later television religious broadcasting via the Scottish service of the BBC which began with his ‘Family Prayers’ series and lasted eighteen years. The then organiser for the BBC's Religious Broadcasting in Scotland, Ronald Falconer, considered Allan's ‘Way to Live’ series a highlight of the period, recording that audience research gave one episode an "Appreciation Index several points above any other Scottish broadcast that week, religious or secular".

Tom Allan was a key planner, contributor and missioner to the 1950 and 1952 ‘Radio Missions,' which Falconer thought unique to Scotland, being Christian mission promoted by radio programmes broadcast by a national network. Local churches were invited to set up listening groups and discuss, assess and act on the content of the broadcasts - Falconer also wrote that while only a small minority did more than simply listen in, North Kelvinside provided model cooperation.

== Tell Scotland and Billy Graham ==
The Tell Scotland Movement emerged directly from the experience of the Radio Missions and more broadly because, post war, churches throughout Europe shared a consensus that mission must be the priority. Supported by Scotland's Protestant denominations, the Movement adopted three principles: that mission is not occasional but continuous; that the agent of mission is the Church itself and that the place of the Layman is decisive. Tom Allan demitted from North Kelvinside and accepted appointment as Field Organiser for Tell Scotland: he travelled widely to communicate the vision and principles of the Movement, and helped develop a three-year plan of preparation, training and practice with the aim of achieving not simply parish missions but missionary parishes.

The Billy Graham campaign in London in 1954 caused divisions in the Tell Scotland leadership: Rev. Dr George MacLeod and the Iona Community especially objecting to such crusade evangelism. Yet as a Billy Graham visit to Scotland seemed inevitable, Tom Allan recommended that an ‘All Scotland Crusade’ could fit into the Tell Scotland programme by inspiring many more lay people to commit themselves to undertake local church evangelism; the Movement's leadership agreed with him and invited Graham to conduct the 'All Scotland Crusade' of March to April, 1955. Tom Allan was appointed Chairman of the Executive Committee for the Crusade while remaining Tell Scotland Field Organiser.

Later analysis of the Crusade was positive and negative. Undoubtedly many new Christians were won and many others inspired to enter more deeply into the work of their local churches, but the Crusade had not penetrated much beyond the existing church allegiance. Many opted for the way of mass evangelism rather than the way of local witness and service, two 'ways' that Tom Allan himself considered had to go hand in hand: "Tom was as left wing as George", George MacLeod's biographer, Ron Ferguson, considered.

== Glasgow: St George’s Tron ==
Following the Crusade, Tom Allan resigned as Organiser for Tell Scotland and in September 1955 became minister of the city-centre of Glasgow at St George's-Tron Church.

Allan continued the pattern of ministry he had followed at North Kelvinside. Preaching the message was paramount and that gathered many hearers by its quality and power. Saturday night Evangelistic Rallies were organised and attracted large attendances. A congregational and area group was opened to all who wanted to equip themselves better for the work of evangelism and service. Teaching and training were intensive.

Beyond congregational membership, the realities of the city centre area were demanding. There were 4,000 residents. More thousands of workers crowding daily into the city centre; a different kind of invasion came for entertainment and retail; the rampant social problems of the city, often revealed in late night and early hours, included homelessness, prostitution, alcohol abuse, criminal activity and ex prisoners. St George's-Tron Church sought to first survey and then to adapt its life to be in contact with these issues. In 1958, in conjunction with D.P. Thomson and the city centre congregations of other denominations, Allan promoted the Glasgow Central Churches Campaign.

Of course, normal church structures could never be adapted to impinge much on the variety of deep-seated social problems. Tom Allan got in touch with the Social Responsibility Department of the Church of Scotland (now called 'Crossreach'). A partnership was formed with the vision of setting up a counselling and rehabilitation facility in the city. The Tom Allan Counselling Centre offered accessible short-term help with all types of problems; the Glasgow Lodging House Mission was a partner for help with homelessness. At the heart of all this were volunteers from the Church. Some were medical and social professionals others provided stand-alongside friendship. All were trained to be able to share their faith in a natural sensitive witness. The congregation began to reflect wider Glasgow society regardless of class or wealth.

== The Media ==
A very different kind of ‘pulpit’ opened up for Tom Allan when he was asked to write a weekly column for the Glasgow Evening Citizen. He was sent to Russia, The Holy Land and Rome to write a series on each one for the newspaper.

BBC broadcasting resumed at St George’s Tron using Tom Allan at the great Festivals of the Christian Year and culminating in a full-length TV film called ‘Meeting Point in the City Centre’. A lesser but important programme that the City Council requested of him was to initiate an anti-smoking ‘clinic’. He took on the challenge although he was himself a very heavy smoker from RAF days. With all the new evidence he stopped and many, mainly men, stopped with him and the BBC broadcast it effectively.

== The End Years ==
All this work load was ‘paused’ when Tom Allan suffered a heart attack in 1961. He had to give up everything. However, it was found that the heart damage was not serious and slowly over a year, he was able to pick up all the tasks as before, accepting invitations to USA and Canada. A second very serious heart attack while visiting a Billy Graham campaign in Miami, USA, made retirement an immediate necessity.

Tom Allan's name and mission lives on in the 'Tom Allan Centre' in Glasgow and in the memories of the many hundreds of people whose lives were changed and influenced.

Rev. Tom Allan died on 8 September 1965 in Glasgow.

=== The St Mungo Prize 1964 ===
The Lord Provost of Glasgow, Mr Peter Meldrum, announcing the award of the 1964 St Mungo Prize "for the person who has done most in the past three years for Glasgow by making it more beautiful, healthy, or more honoured", was reported to have said: "Mr Allan had become a minister, friend, and adviser not only to his parishioners but to many others, no matter their religious persuasion ... He had travelled extensively and carried a strong and favourable impression of Glasgow abroad, so that his church became the meeting place for church leaders from all over the world. Mr Allan had contributed to the cultural and educational development of the city in a worthy and honourable way."

== See also ==
- The Tom Allan Archives are held (2014) by the University of Edinburgh: New College Library.
- ‘Why I Believe’: Tom Allan's contribution to a BBC Radio series of interviews & repeated posthumously as a tribute broadcast: may be available via
- Thomson, D.P. (ed.) (1963)Why I Believe: Tom Allan, James S. Stewart and D.P. Thomson discussing personal Christian belief with Ian Pitt-Watson on B.B.C. Scottish Television, 1962-3, Crieff: St Ninian’s Training Centre, National Library of Scotland shelfmark NE.29.g.16(4.
- Allan, Tom (1954) The Agent of Mission: The Lay Group in Evangelism, Its Significance and Its Task Glasgow: The Tell Scotland Movement.
- Allan, Tom (1955) The Congregational Group in Action Glasgow: The Tell Scotland Movement.
- Allan, Tom & Meikle, Henry B. Tell Scotland Movement discussion, recorded at Aberdeen, 31 October 1954. Held at William Smith Morton Library, Union-PSCE, Richmond, Virginia, USA.
- Paterson, Bill (2008 & 2009)Tales from the back green London: Hodder & Stoughton ISBN 9780340936825. An autobiographical account of a childhood in the Glasgow of the 1950s to which Tom Allan ministered.
