= 1922–23 Scottish Districts season =

Rugby union competition

- Countries: Scotland
- Date: 1922–23
- Matches played: 1

The 1922–23 Scottish Districts season is a record of all the rugby union matches for Scotland's district teams.

== History ==
Edinburgh District beat Glasgow District in the Inter-City match.

== Results ==
Date	Try	Conversion	Penalty	Dropped goal	Goal from mark	Notes
1905–1947	3 points	2 points	3 points	4 points	3 points	

=== Inter-City ===
2 December 1922

Glasgow District	8 – 17	Edinburgh District
	Report

New Anniesland, Glasgow
Referee: Willie Burnet (Hawick)

Glasgow District:
Edinburgh District:

=== Other Scottish matches ===
11 November 1922

Inverness-shire and Ross-shire	–	Aberdeenshire

Inverness

Inverness-shire and Ross-shire:
Aberdeenshire:

18 November 1922

Midlands District	6 – 17	North of Scotland District
Try: Robertson; Black	Report	Try: Gordon; MacGregor; Ian McLeod x 2 Cruickshank; Con: Strathdee

Heatherwick Park, Ladybank
Attendance: 700
Referee: J. C. Smith (Edinburgh Institution)

Midlands District: Donald (Kirkcaldy); McKenzie, Muir, Wighton (Dundee HSFP), and Jenkins (captain) (Dunfermline); Craig (St Andrews University) and Wilson; Black (Dunfermline), Hobb (Dundee HSFP), Andersen, Stevenson (St Andrews University), J. H. S. Davidson, R. Bonthrone (Howe of Fife), Brackenridge (Panmure), Howie (Kirkcaldy), and Robertson (Dunfermline).
North of Scotland District: Jarvis (Highland); McGregor, Gordon, Saunders (Aberdeen Grammar School F.P.), and Ian McLeod (Highland); Cruickshank and Sorley (captain) (Aberdeen Grammar School); Mclntosh, Walker (Highland), G. McLeod (Aberdeen Grammar School), Tom (Aberdeen University), Spark, Watt (Aberdeen Grammar School), Rhind (Aberdeen University), McLellan (Highland) and Strathdee (Gordonians)

25 November 1922

North of Scotland District	–	South of Scotland District
	Report; Report

North of Scotland District:
South of Scotland District:

=== Junior matches ===
24 February 1923

South of Scotland District	–	Edinburgh District

South of Scotland District:
Edinburgh District:

=== Trial matches ===
9 December 1922

Scotland Probables	36 – 6	Scotland Possibles
	Report

The Greenyards, Hawick
Attendance: 6000
Referee: J. H. B. Scott (SRU)

Scotland Probables:
Scotland Possibles:

23 December 1922

Scotland Probables	25 – 14	Scotland Possibles
	Preview; Report

Inverleith, Edinburgh
Attendance: 10,000
Referee: J. M. Tennent (SRU)

Scotland Probables:
Scotland Possibles:

6 January 1923

Scotland Probables	18 – 3	Scotland Possibles
	Report

New Anniesland, Glasgow
Attendance: 7,000
Referee: J. M. Tennent (SRU)

Scotland Probables:
Scotland Possibles:

=== English matches ===
No other District matches played.

=== International matches ===
No touring matches this season.
