= D. P. Thomson =

David Patrick Thomson
- Title: Rev. Dr.

Personal life
- Born: 17 May 1896
- Died: 16 March 1974 (aged 77) Crieff, Scotland
- Spouse: Mary Rothnie
- Education: Glasgow University

Religious life
- Religion: Christian
- Denomination: United Free Church & Church of Scotland
- Church: Dunfermline: Gillespie Memorial (1928–1934); Cambuslang: Trinity (1939–1945)

Senior posting
- Post: Organiser for Evangelism 1947–66; Warden of St Ninian’s, Crieff 1958–66

David Patrick Thomson (17 May 1896 – 16 March 1974) was a minister of the Church of Scotland who followed a vocation in Christian evangelism as a student, a parish minister, a director of Residential Centres, and as a Christian author and publisher.

When he retired in 1966, the General Assembly of the Church of Scotland described him as "One of the outstanding leaders of the Church in this generation".

== Early life and career ==
Born on 17 May 1896 in Dundee, Scotland, D.P. Thomson first led evangelistic services while serving as a lieutenant of the Army Service Corps in the British Salonika Army during the First World War. On return to Britain he continued to preach, first as an itinerant evangelist and then as a student for the ministry of the United Free Church of Scotland.

In 1917 and 1918 Thomson was the representative in Scotland of the Heart of Africa Mission (now WEC International) led in Africa by Charles Studd and in the UK by Mrs Priscilla Studd.

As a student at Glasgow University 'DP' (as he was often known, "never with disrespect if not always with affection") created the Glasgow Students Evangelistic Union and led many campaigns, 1922–28, being responsible for encouraging Eric Liddell, the Scottish international rugby player and Olympic gold-medalist athlete, to speak publicly of his faith in Christ.

Thomson graduated M.A. at Glasgow in 1922.

== As a publisher, editor and author ==
While training for the ministry, Thomson founded the Thomson & Cowan trading company and published a series of books entitled Handbooks of Modern Evangelism. As he acknowledged later in life, these were edited by himself and his brother Robert under the pseudonym 'Two University Men'. Copies of the series held in the National Library of Scotland are: Evangelism in the Modern World, Modern Evangelistic Movements, Winning the Children for Christ and The Modern Evangelistic Address.

Thomson edited and/or wrote a substantial number of books and pamphlets on evangelism and on Scottish church history. These were often self-published, a matter of regret to his first biographer, Rev. Dr Ian Doyle. Thomson's three autobiographical works were: The Road to Dunfermline: The Story of a Thirty-Five Years' Quest, Why I Believe and Personal Encounters.

In the 1930s, while Warden of the St Ninian's Centre, Lassodie, Thomson created The Lassodie Press and published further Christian titles edited by him, including Scottish Pulpit: Sermons by representative Scottish preachers, Professor as Preacher: Sermons by Scottish Theological Professors, and Women in the Pulpit: Sermons and Addresses by Representative Women Preachers.

Four of Thomson's books attracted more commercial publishers and a wider readership: these were Men Christ Wants: Evangelistic Addresses, How I found Christ. Personal Narratives Of Conversion, and two books containing stories of missionary adventures, intended for a younger readership: Labrador To Savage Island – Stories Of The Ships Of Christ – Maritime Missionary Adventure Throughout The World, and Goodwin Sands to Solomon Islands: More Stories of the Ships of Christ.

Many of Thomson's pamphlets were on Scottish church history. George Wishart: The Man Who Roused Scotland was commissioned by the Wishart Quarter-Centenary Committee for the commemoration held that year at St Andrews. Other pamphlets were produced in connection with campaigns in particular areas: for example, It Happened in Kintyre supported the campaign in the Kintyre peninsula of 1949.

== Adult ministry – first phase ==
Ordained in 1928, 'DP' served first as minister of Dunfermline: Gillespie Memorial congregation. In 1934 he was appointed to the staff of the Home Board of the Church of Scotland as an evangelist, leading Seaside Missions in the summer and local campaigns in the winter months. During this period he also founded the St Ninian's, Lassodie, Training Centre (in Fife) and the Lassodie Press.

D.P. Thomson married Miss Mary Rothnie in 1939: she was the daughter of Rev. Douglas Rothnie, minister at Lucea, Jamaica. They had no children.

During the Second World War he was minister at Cambuslang: Trinity Church of Scotland and founded ‘The Church of Scotland Fellowship in Evangelism’.

Many members of the congregation were called up for war-service and at the end of the war the Service Personnel Committee of Trinity Church published a duplicated volume, Letters To The Manse From Members And Adherent Of Trinity Church, Cambuslang, On Service With The Navy, The Army, The Air Forces, The WMS The ATS, The WAAF, The Mercantile Marine, The Land Army And The Nursing Services 1939–1945, on behalf of its funds.

Learning that his friend Eric Liddell had died in a Japanese Internment Camp on 21 February 1945, D.P. Thomson became Secretary to the Eric Liddell Memorial Committee. Funds were raised to assist Liddell's widow and for the education of their children and also to endow an Eric Liddell Memorial Trophy for the best boys’ performance at the Scottish Schools Athletic Championships. To support the Fund, 'DP' wrote a short biographical pamphlet: Eric Liddell: The Making Of An Athlete And The Training Of A Missionary, which was published in Glasgow by the Committee in 1946. The archives of Eric Liddell Memorial Fund are [2014] held by the Lloyds Banking Group Archives (Edinburgh).

Later, Thomson wrote a full-length biography of Eric Liddell: Scotland's Greatest Athlete: The Eric Liddell Story, republished in hardback as Eric H. Liddell: Athlete and Missionary.

== Adult ministry - second phase ==
From January 1946 'DP' was again appointed by the Home Board as organiser for seaside mission and summer camp work, a post which also allowed him to lead evangelistic campaigns. One of these, in Glasgow: North Kelvinside, the parish of one of his seaside mission leaders, Rev. Tom Allan, caught public attention for its use of intensive visiting of the parish by congregational members and volunteers from outside. Thomson came to specialize in Visitation Campaigns, which in their developed form involved teams visiting all homes in the target area as well as most places of work, cinemas, pubs, football matches etc. - the worlds of home, work and leisure. In order to concentrate on this work, he secured Tom Allan's secondment from North Kelvinside to organize the seaside mission programme of 1949.

D.P. Thomson had a supporting role in the Tell Scotland Movement and also in the Edinburgh events of the Billy Graham All-Scotland Campaign of spring 1955.

To coordinate the volunteers Thomson recruited from congregations across Scotland he founded the Work & Witness Movement and, 1955–58, led geographically ambitious campaigns in the Western and Northern Islands. These campaigns were not without their critics. Some thought that the use of volunteers from outside undercut mission by church members living in the area, that the missions were "perfunctory and superficial".

In 1958 ‘DP’ founded his second Residential Centre for Lay Training at the St Ninian's Centre, Crieff, and was its Warden until retirement in 1966 – after which he continued writing from what he described as ‘The Research Unit', his own home at Barnoak, Crieff.

D.P. Thomson was awarded an honorary D.D. by the University of Glasgow in 1962. He died on 16 March 1974.

The Council on Mission and Discipleship of the Church of Scotland is D.P. Thomson's literary executor, and they retain his remaining archive of papers, including his multi-volume 'Diary of My Life'.

== Theology ==
D.P. Thomson, in his autobiographical The Road to Dunfermline, claimed to have learned most from the American evangelist, Dwight L. Moody. He also admired Henry Sloane Coffin and claimed that as an adult his own trajectory was away from the fundamentalism of his youth. Within British evangelicalism Bebbington held the broad or open evangelical approach he described as "centrist" ... "was probably most successful in Scotland, where D.P. Thomson and Tom Allan were leaders of an effective movement of co-ordinated lay evangelism."

As he was not primarily a theologian, Thomson's approach could also be described as "pragmatic".

Evangelism, D.P. Thomson believed, was an imperative: "Evangelism is at once the primary work of the Church and the most urgent need of the hour. It is hardly possible to exaggerate its urgency or to overestimate its importance.... If [the Church] fails to display a living and vigorous evangelism, she has failed in her essential and ultimate mission, and the days of her influence are numbered."

== Significance ==
Although after 1947 Thomson sought primarily to utilize the "sleeping giant of the lay forces of the Church", his ministry was also said to be responsible for "a steady stream of men and women for the whole-time service of the Church, as ministers, missionaries, deaconesses, lay missionaries and teachers".

Thomson emphasized the contribution offered by women to the ministries of the church, publishing pamphlets on Women as Elders: The Verdict of Experience, Women Ministers in Scotland: Personal Records of Experience and Discovery and The Elder’s Wife: her place in the life and work of the Church He supported the Order of Deaconesses.

After 1955 'DP' diverged from both Tom Allan and Billy Graham, preferring to emphasize the significance of the personal approach rather than the mass meeting as means of outreach, publishing his findings in Dr Billy Graham And The Pattern Of Modern Evangelism, Crieff: St Ninian's Training Centre 1966.

Thomson's influence in the Scottish Churches of the period following the Second World War has been compared to that of Rev. George MacLeod, whose biographer wrote: "Church people often divided themselves into Thomson men or MacLeod men".

Not all appreciated Thomson: in a memorial tribute, Ian Doyle acknowledged that Thomson could be thought "a difficult man to work with", "off-hand and ungracious", with an "arrogance and loudness of his manner"; "he gave offense to some by the sheer vehemence of his enthusiasms". Yet he also admired Thomson's deeper humility, loyalty, capacity for affection and commitment.

== Bibliography: list of books published, edited and/or written by D.P. Thomson ==
This is a list of books and pamphlets published, edited and/or written by D.P. Thomson, as retained in the National Library of Scotland. The list is organised by publishers, in chronological order.

'Two University Men' was a pseudonym for D.P. Thomson and his brother Robert.

Thomson & Cowan, Glasgow

- George H. Morrison, The Significance of the Cross: a New Testament Study: being outlines of three lectures delivered in Wellington Church Glasgow, October 1923. 1923.
- ‘Two University Men’ (ed.), Evangelism in the Modern World / The Handbooks of Modern Evangelism. 1924. Includes, by the Editors, ‘Introduction’.
- ‘Two University Men’ (ed.), Modern Evangelistic Movements / The Handbooks of Modern Evangelism. 1924. Includes, by the Editors, ‘Introduction’.
- ‘Two University Men’ (ed.), Winning the Children for Christ / The Handbooks of Modern Evangelism. 1924. Includes: by D.P. Thomson: ‘The case for evangelistic meetings for children’ and ‘The conduct of Children’s meetings’; by ‘One of the Editors’, ‘The fruits of evangelistic work among children’; and, by ‘The Editors’, ‘Introduction’.
- ‘Two University Men’ (ed.), The Modern Evangelistic Address / The Handbooks of Modern Evangelism. 1924. Includes, by ‘The Editors’, ‘Introduction’.
- D.P. Thomson (ed.), The Scottish Pulpit / Sermons by Representative Scottish preachers. 1924
- D.P. Thomson (ed., with James Kelly and Carey Bonner), The Sunday School in the Modern World. 1924.
- Hubert L. Simpson and D.P. Thomson (ed.), United Free Church Sermons. 1924. Includes ‘Foreword’ by D.S. Cairns.
- Newton H. Marshall, Conversion or The New Birth. (1909) Republished by Thomson & Cowan 1924.
- David C. Mitchell, The Nonsense of Neutrality And Other Sermons From A City Pulpit. 1924.
- James Sommerville Smith, Miller of Ruchill: The Story Of A Great Achievement. 1925; with, by D. P. Thomson, an ‘Introductory Chapter’.
- George W. Truett (compiled & ed., J.B. Cranfill), A quest for souls: comprising all the sermons preached and prayers offered in a series of Gospel meetings, held in Fort Worth, Texas. 1925.

Marshall, Morgan & Scott, London

- D.P. Thomson (ed.), How I found Christ. Personal Narratives Of Conversion. 1937.
- D.P. Thomson, Men Christ Wants. Evangelistic Addresses. 1937.

The Lassodie Press, Dunfermline

- D.P. Thomson (ed., assisted by Daniel Patterson and others), Scottish Churches’ Handbook. 1933.
- Alexander Hetherwick, The Romance of Blantyre: How Livingstone’s Dream came True. 1931 & 32.
- William McMillan, The Worship of the Scottish Reformed Church, 1550–1638. 1931.
- D.P. Thomson (ed.), Scottish Pulpit / Sermons By Representative Scottish Preachers. 1937.
- D.P. Thomson (ed.), Professor as Preacher / Sermons By Scottish Theological Professors. 1939.
- D.P. Thomson (ed.), Women in the Pulpit. Sermons And Addresses By Representative Women Preachers. 1944.

Cambuslang: Trinity Church of Scotland

- D.P. Thomson, Two Scotsmen See Jamaica; An Account Of A Three Month’s Missionary And Travel Tour In The ‘Isle Of Beauty And Romance’ In The Winter Of 1937–8, In The Form Of Letters To A Correspondent At Home. Published as bound typed sheets, Cambuslang 1945, for the Cambuslang: Trinity Service Personnel Committee.
- D.P. Thomson (ed.), Letters To The Manse From Members And Adherent Of Trinity Church, Cambuslang, On Service With The Navy, The Army, The Air Forces, The WMS The ATS, The WAAF, The Mercantile Marine, The Land Army And The Nursing Services 1939–1945. A duplicated and stapled typescript c.1945, published by the Service Personnel Committee of Trinity Church, Cambuslang.

For The Eric Liddell Memorial Committee

- D.P. Thomson, Eric Liddell: The Making Of An Athlete And The Training Of A Missionary. For the Eric Liddell Memorial Committee, Glasgow 1945.
- Robert Law D.D., Death and the Life Beyond – What The New Testament Teaches (ed. and abridged by D.P. Thomson). Glasgow 1947 for the Editor; with profits allocated to the Eric Liddell Memorial Fund.

For the Melrose Presbytery Campaign Fund

- D.P. Thomson, Alexander Waugh: An Earlston Grammar School Boy. Galashiels. 1946.
- D.P. Thomson, James Guthrie: The Covenanting Minister Of Lauder And Stirling. Galashiels. 1946.
- D.P. Thomson, The Lad From Torwoodlee – The Romantic Story Of Principal John Lee Of Edinburgh University. 1946.
- D.P. Thomson, Scotland’s First Deaconess – Lady Grisell Baillie Of Mellerstain And Dryburgh. 1946.
- D.P. Thomson, Sweet Singer Of Melrose: The Story Of Elizabeth Clephane And Her Famous Hymn. 1946.
- D.P. Thomson, Those Ministers Of Galashiels! for the Melrose Presbytery Campaign Fund 1946.
- D.P. Thomson, Janet Melville Of Aberdeen – And Her Famous Boys’ Class. Edinburgh 1947.

The George Wishart Quarter-Centenary Committee

- D.P. Thomson, George Wishart: The Man Who Roused Scotland. Edinburgh 1946 at the request of the Wishart Quarter-Centenary Committee.

Pickering & Inglis, London & Glasgow

- D.P. Thomson, Labrador To Savage Island. Stories Of The Ships Of Christ. Maritime Missionary Adventure Throughout The World / With . . . Illustrations By Robert Marshall. 1947.
- D.P. Thomson, Goodwin Sands To Solomon Islands. More Stories Of The Ships Of Christ. Maritime Missionary Adventure Throughout The World / With . . . Illustrations By Robert Marshall. 1948.
- D.P. Thomson, Men Christ Wants. Evangelistic Addresses. (Reprint of 1937 edition.)

As Organiser for Evangelism, The Home Board of the Church of Scotland

- D.P. Thomson, The Church On The Sands; The Summer Seaside Work Of The Church Of Scotland. Glasgow 1948 (2nd edition, revised).
- D.P. Thomson, The Road To Dunfermline : The Story Of A Thirty-Five Years’ Quest. Pt.1, An Evangelist In Training, 1916–1933. Crieff 1952.
- D.P. Thomson, .Born In Kirkcaldy. A First Series Of Short Biographical Sketches Of Famous Natives Of The Town And District. Kirkcaldy 1952.
- D.P. Thomson, Raith And Kirkcaldy: A Second Series Of Short Biographical Studies Of Famous Natives Of The Town And District. Kirkcaldy 1952.
- D.P. Thomson, By The Water Of Leith. The Life Of A North Edinburgh Parish. Edinburgh 1952.
- D.P. Thomson, It Happened In Kintyre. Glasgow 1952.
- D.P. Thomson, Kintyre Through The Centuries. Glasgow 1952.
- D.P. Thomson, On The Slopes Of The Sidlaws – On Some Of The Ministers Of The District. Crieff 1953.
- D.P. Thomson (ed.), Scottish Devotional Treasury. 1st series. Arranged In The Form Of A Month’s Daily Devotional Readings From The Great Scottish Preachers And Writers. Crieff 1955.

Associated with The Tell Scotland Movement

- D.P. Thomson (ed.), The Voice of the Pew: What Christ and His Church Mean to Me: A Work and Witness Symposium By A Doctor And A Shop Assistant, A Clerk And A Mathematics Master. Crieff 1954.
- D.P. Thomson (ed.), We Saw The Church In Action! The Press and BBC report on those visitation campaigns 1947 to 1954. Crieff 1954/55.
- D.P. Thomson, They Came From Caithness. A Gallery Of Northern Notables, Being Pen Portraits Of Famous Caithnessians. Crieff 1954.
- D.P. Thomson, Guidance For Those Engaged In House-To-House Visitation Campaigns. Crieff 1955.
- D.P. Thomson (prepared by), New Testament Conversions. A Question Course Handbook For Preachers, Teachers, Personal Workers and Counsellors, And Bible Study Groups. Crieff 1955.
- D.P. Thomson, Tales Of The Far North-West. A Sutherlandshire Miscellany. Stories Of The Church In Sutherland. Crieff 1955.
- D.P. Thomson (ed.), Two by Two! The Rank And File Of The Church Report On What Happened When They Went Out Visiting. Crieff 1955.
- D.P. Thomson (ed.), You Are Going Out Visiting? Let us tell you a little about it!’ By (1) Elders of the Kirk, (2) Women of the Guild, (3) The Young People. Crieff 1955.
- D.P. Thomson, Beginning The Christian Life: A First Month’s Daily Bible Reading From The New Testament For The Young Disciple. Crieff 1955.
- D.P. Thomson, The Sutherland Adventure. The ‘Tell Scotland’ Campaign In The Presbytery Of Tongue, August 1955 / With Contributions By David Maxwell . . . And Other Members Of The Team. Crieff 1956.
- D.P. Thomson, West Highland Adventure. The ‘Tell Scotland’ Campaign In Mull And Iona, Coll And Tiree, Morvern And Ardnamurchan, Spring 1956. Crieff 1956.
- D.P. Thomson (prepared by), Epistle To The Philippians. A Four Week Question Course For ‘Tell Scotland’ Training Schools And Campaigns And For Preachers, Teachers, Bible Students And Bible Study Groups. Crieff 1956.
- D.P. Thomson, Iona To Ardnamurchan By Mull, Coll, And Tiree. A Pilgrimage Through The Centuries. Crieff 1956.
- D.P. Thomson, Orkney Through The Centuries. Lights And Shadows Of The Church’s Life In The Northern Isles. Crieff 1956.
- D.P. Thomson, From Island To Island! Experiences And Adventures Of The ‘Tell Scotland’ Summer Campaign Team In Orkney. July To September, 1956 . . . With Map And Illustrations. Crieff 1956.
- D.P. Thomson (prepared by), The Parables Of Jesus. A Question Course For Preachers, Teachers, Bible Students And Bible Study Groups. Crieff 1956.
- D.P. Thomson, Harnessing The Lay Forces Of The Church. Experiences, Adventures And Discoveries etc 1946–57. Crieff 1958.

St Ninian's Training Centre, Crieff

- D.P. Thomson, What Christ Means To Me. An Open-Air Service Of Christian Witness. Held At Macrosty Park, Crieff On . . . 2nd August 1959 . . . With . . . D. P. Thomson And Others. 1959.
- D.P. Thomson, Through Sixteen Centuries: The Story Of The Scottish Church From Earliest Times To The Present Day. 1960.
- D.P. Thomson, Women Of The Scottish Reformation; Their Contribution To The Protestant Cause. 1960.
- D.P. Thomson, It Happened In Iona: Forgotten Chapters In The History Of Scotland’s Sacred Isle. c.1956.
- Members & Friends of Work & Witness, Answered Prayer. The Book Dept. of St Ninian's Crieff after 1960.
- D.P. Thomson, David Inglis Cowan: Man And Minister, 1892–1950. 1961.
- D.P. Thomson (prepared by), The Ten Commandments: A Question Course For Preachers, Teachers, Bible Students And Bible Study Groups. 1962.
- D.P. Thomson (ed.), Why I Believe / Tom Allan, James S. Stewart and D. P. Thomson, discussing personal Christian belief with Ian Pitt-Watson on B.B.C. Scottish Television, 1962-3. 1963.
- D.P. Thomson (ed.), Tomorrow’s Ministers: Who are they? What are they thinking? What shall we say to them?. 1963.
- D.P. Thomson (ed.), The Minister’s Wife: Her Life, Work & Problems. 1964.
- [D.P. Thomson], Life And Work At St Ninian’s Crieff. 1965.
- D.P. Thomson (prepared by), The Epistle to the Romans chapters 12 to 16; a question course for preachers, teachers, Bible students and Bible Study Groups. 1965.
- D.P. Thomson (ed.), Women as Elders: The Verdict of Experience. 1965.
- D.P. Thomson (ed.), Women Ministers in Scotland: Personal Records of Experience and Discovery. 1965.
- D.P. Thomson, Dr Billy Graham And The Pattern Of Modern Evangelism. 1966.

The Research Unit, Crieff

- D.P. Thomson, Lady Glenorchy And Her Churches. 1967.
- D.P. Thomson, Personal Encounters: Reminiscences Of 70 Years. 1967.
- D.P. Thomson, Aspects Of Evangelism. 1968. (Includes material from A Pocket Guide for Personal Workers and The Road Ahead; and borrows from Evangelism in the Modern World.)
- D.P. Thomson, Personal Work For Christ. 1968. (Republishing material from Aspects of Evangelism.)
- D.P. Thomson, When Christ Calls. Evangelistic Addresses. 1968.
- D.P. Thomson, The Radical Reappraisal Report: Churches Under The Spotlight: A New Approach To Congregational And Parish Life. 1969.
- D.P. Thomson (ed.), First Communion: The Preparation And Admission Of New Communicants; Report And Comment By 120 Ministers Of The Church Of Scotland. 1969.
- D.P. Thomson (ed.), 100 Topics For Discussion: A Handbook For Study Circles, House Groups, Training Classes, Conferences And Training Schools. 1970.
- D.P. Thomson, Scotland’s Greatest Athlete: The Eric Liddell Story. (pb) 1970.
- D.P. Thomson, Eric H. Liddell: Athlete & Missionary. 1971. (Hardback version of Scotland’s Greatest Athlete.)
- D.P. Thomson, The Beadle Yesterday And Today. 1971.
- D.P. Thomson (ed.), The Elder’s Wife: Her Place In The Life And Work Of The Church. 1973.

Rebindings

- D.P. Thomson, Border Booklets. Crieff 1952. Rebinding of James Guthrie, Alexander Waugh, Those Ministers of Galashiels, The Lad from Torwoodlee, The Sweet Singer of Melrose, Scotland’s First Deaconess.
- D.P. Thomson, From Caithness To Kintyre: Historical And Geographical Studies. Crieff 1956. Rebinding of They Came From Caithness, Tales Of The Far North-West, George Wishart, On The Slopes Of The Sidlaws, It Happened In Kintyre, Kintyre Through The Centuries.
- D.P. Thomson, Visitation Evangelism In Scotland. Crieff 1956. Rebinding of Guidance For Those Engaged In House-To-House Visitation Campaigns, You Are Going Out Visiting?, Two By Two, We Saw The Church In Action, The Sutherland Adventure, West Highland Adventure.
- D.P. Thomson, Aids To Evangelism. Crieff 1956. Rebinding of Beginning With The Ministry, The Way Of The Incarnation, Men Christ Wants, New Testament Conversions, Beginning The Christian Life, The Voice Of The Pew, Guidance For Those Engaged In House-To-House Visitation.
- D.P. Thomson, Visitation Evangelism In Scotland. Crieff after 1958. Rebinding of We Saw The Church In Action, The Sutherland Adventure, West Highland Adventure, From Island To Island!, Harnessing The Lay Forces Of The Church.
- D.P. Thomson, Historical, Biblical, Biographical and Other Studies. 1962 hb Rebinding of Through Sixteen Centuries, Women of the Scottish Reformation, George Wishart, The Epistle to the Philippians, The Parables of Jesus, Eric Liddell, The Road to Dunfermline, What Christ Means to Me.
- D.P. Thomson, Booklets by D. P. Thomson. hb nd. Rebinding of Eric Liddell, George Wishart, Men Christ Wants, Beginning the Christian Life, Death and the Life Beyond, By the Water of Leith, It Happened in Kintyre, Kintyre through Three Centuries.
- D.P. Thomson, Orkney To Iona: Studies In Regional Scottish Church History. Crieff c.1972. Rebinding of George Wishart, Women of the Reformation, Orkney through the Centuries, It happened in Iona.
