= City Mission (disambiguation) =

City Missions were Christian missions established in cities, as part of the City Mission movement started by David Nasmith in 1826.

City Mission may also refer to:

- Glasgow City Mission
- London City Mission
- Melbourne City Mission
