= Evangelical revival in Scotland =

George Whitefield preaching at Cambuslang in 1742

The evangelical revival in Scotland was a series of religious movements in Scotland from the eighteenth century, with periodic revivals into the twentieth century. It began in the later 1730s as congregations experienced intense "awakenings" of enthusiasm, renewed commitment and rapid expansion. This was first seen at Easter Ross in the Highlands in 1739 and most famously in the Cambuslang Wark near Glasgow in 1742. Most of the new converts were relatively young and from the lower groups in society. Unlike awakenings elsewhere, the early revival in Scotland did not give rise to a major religious movement, but mainly benefited the secession churches, who had broken away from the Church of Scotland. In the late eighteenth century and early nineteenth century the revival entered a second wave, known in the US as the Second Great Awakening. In Scotland this was reflected in events like the Kilsyth Revival in 1839. The early revival mainly spread in the Central Belt, but it became active in the Highlands and Islands, peaking towards the middle of the nineteenth century. Scotland gained many of the organisations associated with the revival in England, including Sunday Schools, mission schools, ragged schools, Bible societies and improvement classes.

In the nineteenth century the Church of Scotland was divided between the evangelicals and the Moderate Party. Events came to a head in the Great Disruption in which many of the evangelicals, particularly in the North and Highlands left to form the Free Church of Scotland. The country began to gain relatively large numbers of non-conformist churches and congregations, which were evangelical in outlook, including the Quakers, Baptist, Congregationalist and Methodist churches. They were joined by the Salvation Army, the Open and the Exclusive Brethren. A strand of evangelicalism developed in the Scottish Episcopal Church in the early nineteenth century, leading a group in Edinburgh to form a separate English Episcopal congregation.

A major emphasis of evangelical Protestantism were organised missions. In the eighteenth century the focus had been the Highlands and Islands. Missions also developed to fishermen and to the growing communities of the urban poor. The visit of American evangelists Moody and Sankey in 1874–75 revitalised the evangelical mission. David Livingstone became the movement's most well-known foreign missionary. After his death, Scottish missionary efforts were fuelled by the rivalry between different denominations in Scotland.

There continued to be spontaneous outbreaks of revival in the twentieth century. The most successful was the 1955 tour of Scotland by Billy Graham, which reversed the decline in church attendance in Scotland. In the late twentieth century the movement became divided. Evangelicalism had permeated Scottish leaving a legacy of strict Sabbatarianism and had helped foster local identities in the Highlands.

== Nature ==
The revival was spread by regular preaching and intense local revivals, where whole communities became highly concerned for their souls. This often occurred at communion, which was the central occasion of the church, conducted infrequently, at most once a year. Where ministers refused or neglected parish communion, largely assemblies were carried out in the open air, often combining several parishes. These large gatherings were discouraged by the General Assembly of the Church of Scotland, but continued. They could become mixed with secular activities and were commemorated as such by Robert Burns in the poem Holy Fair. These were transformed by evangelicals into sacred occasions, with sermons by popular preachers and the sharing of spiritual experience. The communion season lasted from Thursday to Monday. In the Highlands communicants travelled great distances and lodged with friends and family. On Friday, known as the question day, lay catechists, called "the men", would give their interpretations of Bible verses chosen by the minister. They would occasionally emerge as charismatic leaders of local revivals. The climax was the Sabbath day celebration of communion, often outdoors in a natural amphitheatre.

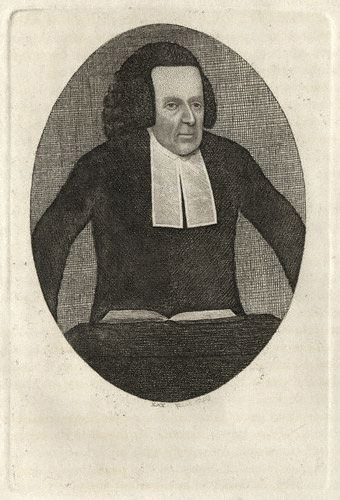
John Erskine, leading figure in the movement in the late eighteenth century

Most of the new converts were relatively young and from the lower groups in society, such as small tenants, craftsmen, servants and the unskilled, with a relatively high proportion of unmarried women. This has been seen as a reaction against the oligarchical nature of the established kirk, which was dominated by local lairds and heritors. Unlike awakenings elsewhere, in the eighteenth century the revival in Scotland did not give rise to a major religious movement, but mainly benefited the secession churches, who had broken away from the Church of Scotland in the eighteenth century. The Associate Presbytery and Presbytery of Relief had broken from the Church of Scotland over issues of patronage in the mid-eighteenth century. The Associate Presbytery then split over the Burgess oath imposed after the Jacobite rebellion of 1745, with one faction forming the separate General Associate Synod. Between 1799 and 1806 the Old and New Light controversy, with the "Old Lichts" following closely the principles of the Covenanters, while the "New Lichts" were more evangelical and focused on personal salvation, split both the Associate and General Associate Presbyteries. This paved the way for a form of reunification, as both the New Licht factions joined together in 1820 to form the United Secession Church, which claimed to have 361 congregations and 261,000 followers at its inception. Thanks to the revival, the secession churches had made headway in recruitment, and by 1830 30 per cent of the Scottish population were members. They made particular advances in the major urban centres. In Glasgow in 1835-36 40 per cent of the population were members and in Edinburgh and it was 42 per cent.

The leading figure in the evangelical movement within the Church of Scotland in the eighteenth century was John Erskine (1721–1803), who was minister of Old Greyfriars Church in Edinburgh from 1768. He was orthodox in doctrine, but sympathised with the Enlightenment and supported reforms in religious practice. A popular preacher, he corresponded with religious leaders in other countries, including New England theologian Johnathan Edwards (1703–58), whose ideas were a major influence on the movement in Scotland.

The movement was supported by the publication of Bibles and tracts, such as those printed by Peter Drummond at Stirling from 1848. In the late eighteenth century and early nineteenth century, Scotland gained many of the organisations associated with the revival in England, including Sunday Schools, mission schools, ragged schools, Bible societies and improvement classes.

== First wave ==
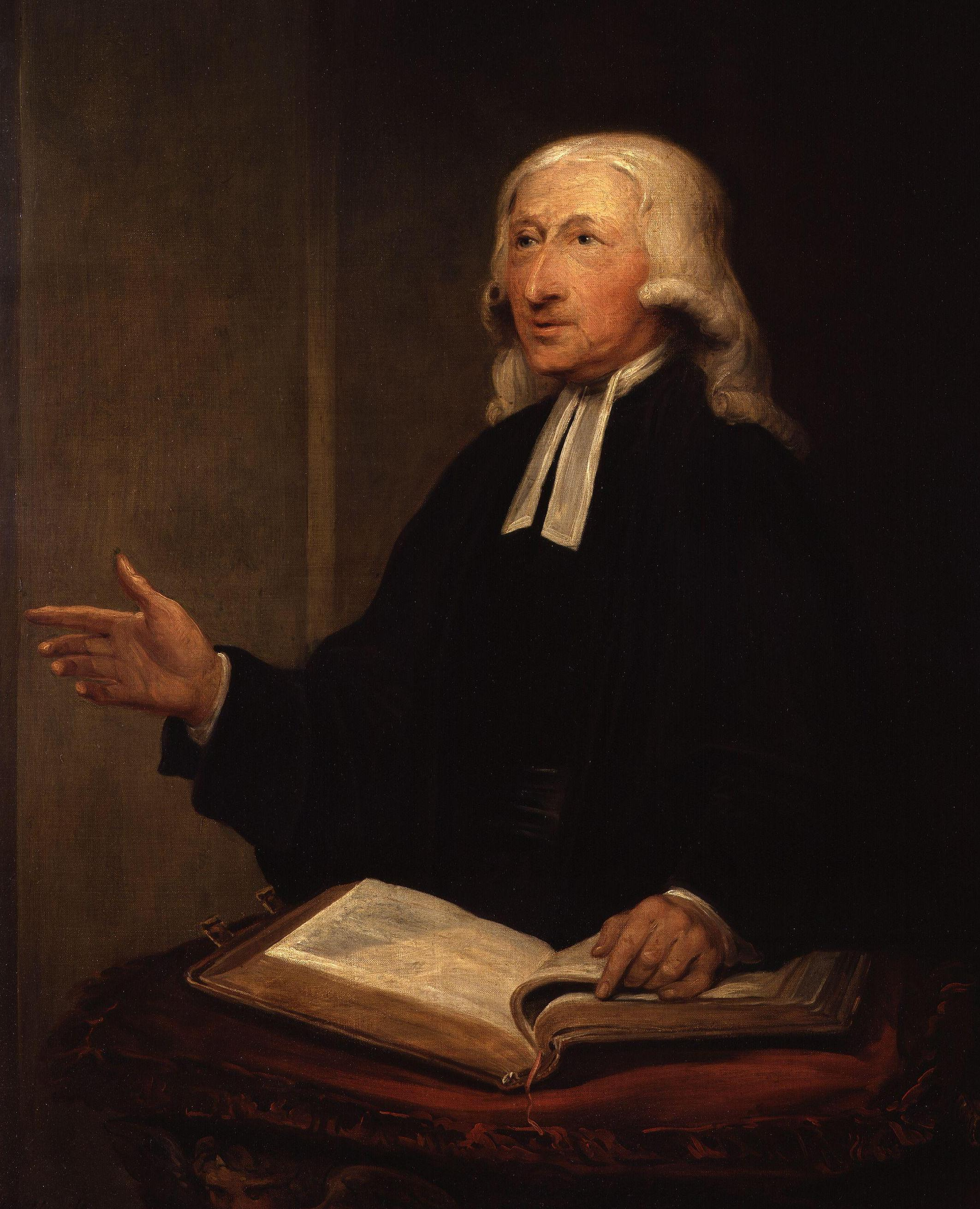
John Wesley, who visited Scotland over 20 times

The evangelical revival was a movement that arose within Protestantism at roughly the same time in North America (where it is known as the First Great Awakening), England, Wales and Scotland. It put an emphasis on the Bible, the doctrine of atonement, conversion and the need to practice and spread the gospel. It began to manifest itself in Scotland in the later 1730s as Protestant congregations, usually in a specific locations, experienced intense "awakenings" of enthusiasm, renewed commitment and, sometimes, rapid expansion. This was first seen at Easter Ross in the Highlands in 1739 and most famously in the Cambuslang Wark (work) near Glasgow in 1742, where intense religious activity culminated in a crowd of perhaps 30,000 gathering there to hear the English preacher George Whitefield. Scotland was also visited 22 times by John Wesley, the English evangelist and founder of Methodism, between 1751 and 1790.

== Second wave ==
In the late eighteenth century and early nineteenth century the revival entered a second wave, known in the US as the Second Great Awakening. The early revival had mainly spread in the Central Belt, but the second revival became increasingly important in the Highlands and Islands. It was reflected in events like the Kilsyth Revival in 1839, the 1849-50 series of revivals that were particularly common among fishing communities and, in the following decade, the movement extended among Lanarkshire miners. Here the lack of a clear parochial structure led to a repeated pattern of spiritual enthusiasm, recession and renewal. Because the revival occurred at the same time as the transformation of the Highlands into a crofting society, evangelicalism was often linked to popular protest against patronage and the Highland clearances. Revivals in the Highlands probably peaked towards the middle of the nineteenth century, fed by the Ten Years Conflict and the Great Disruption.

== Third wave ==
A wave of urban revivalism began in New York in 1858, sometimes called the "Layman's Revival" because of the prominence of lay preachers. It reached Scotland the next year following a trade depression and enthusiasm would continue in a heightened form until 1862. In the major manufacturing districts of the country, prayer meetings were held in offices and factories and in the streets of Edinburgh and Glasgow. Some viewed the revival with alarm, as it caused absenteeism from work and long prayer meetings disrupted the working day. The revival saw an innovation in the introduction of the professional revivalist preacher, including Charles Grandison Finney (1792–1875), who visited Edinburgh in 1859. Together with Edward Payson Hammond, he introduced the distinctive revivalist service of a short sermon, joyous hymns and calls for members of the congregation to come forward.

== Impact on the Church of Scotland ==
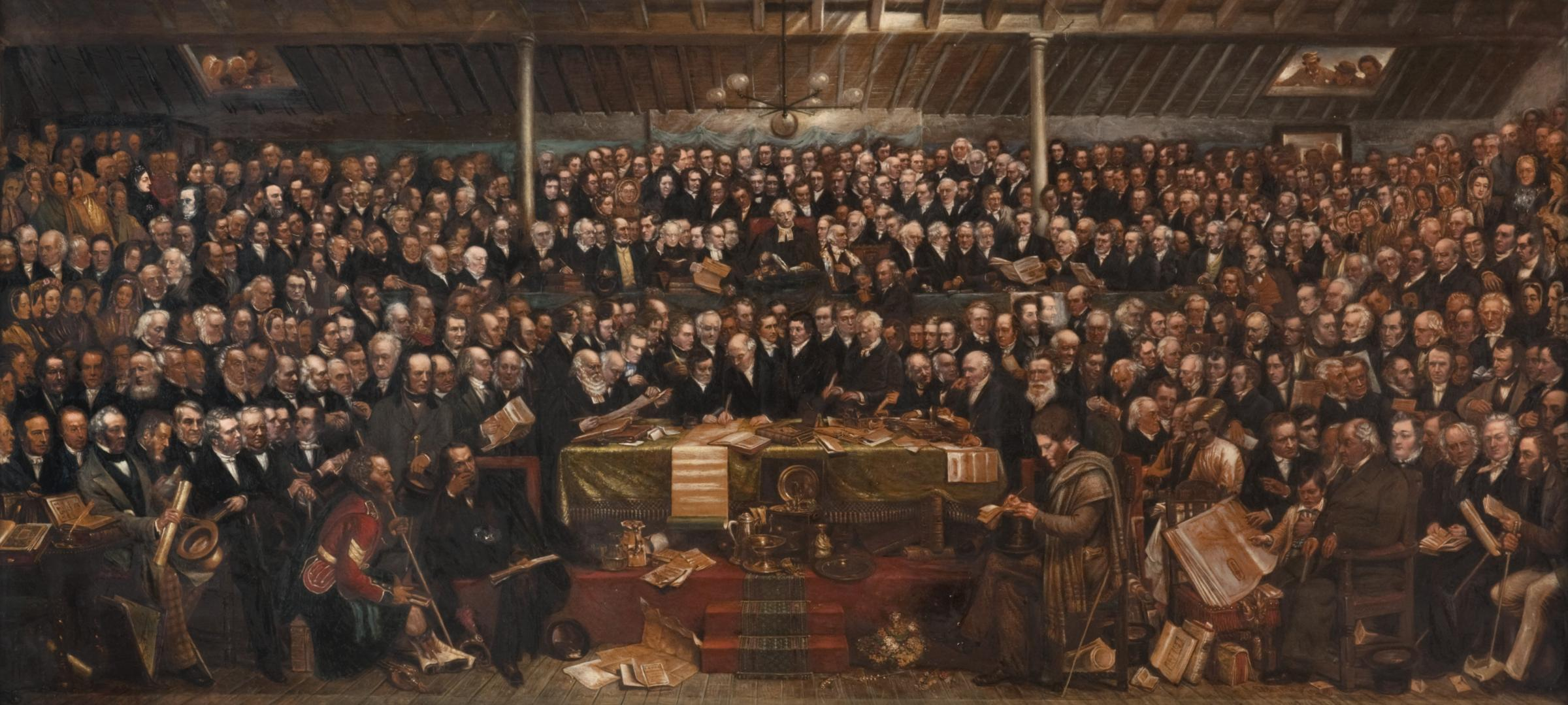
The Disruption Assembly, painted by David Octavius Hill

In the nineteenth century the Church of Scotland was increasingly divided between the evangelicals and the Moderate Party. While evangelicals emphasised the authority of the Bible and the traditions and historical documents of the kirk, the Moderates, who had dominated the General Assembly of the Church since the mid-eighteenth century, tended to stress intellectualism in theology, the established hierarchy of the kirk and attempted to raise the social status of the clergy. The major issue was the patronage of landholders and heritors over appoints to the ministry. Thomas Chalmers began as a Moderate, but increasingly became an evangelical, emerging as the leading figure in the movement.

After prolonged years of struggle, in 1834 the evangelicals gained control of the General Assembly and passed the Veto Act, which allowed congregations to reject unwanted "intrusive" presentations to livings by patrons and the Chapels Act, which put the ministers of Chapels of Ease on an equal footing with ordinary parish ministers. The following "Ten Years' Conflict" of legal and political wrangling ended in defeat for the non-intrusionists in the civil courts, reaching the Court of Session and then finally the House of Lords in 1839, which declared the acts unconstitutional. In 1842 evangelicals presented to the General Assembly a Claim, Declaration and Protest anent the Encroachments of the Court of Session, known as the Claim of Right, that questioned the validity of civil jurisdiction over the church. When the Claim of Right was rejected by the General Assembly the result was a schism from the church by some of the non-intrusionists led by Thomas Chalmers, known as the Great Disruption of 1843. Some 454, roughly a third, of the 1,195 clergy of the established church, mainly from the North and Highlands, formed the separate Free Church of Scotland. The Free Church was more accepting of Gaelic language and culture, grew rapidly in the Highlands and Islands, appealing much more strongly than did the established church.

== Voluntary churches ==
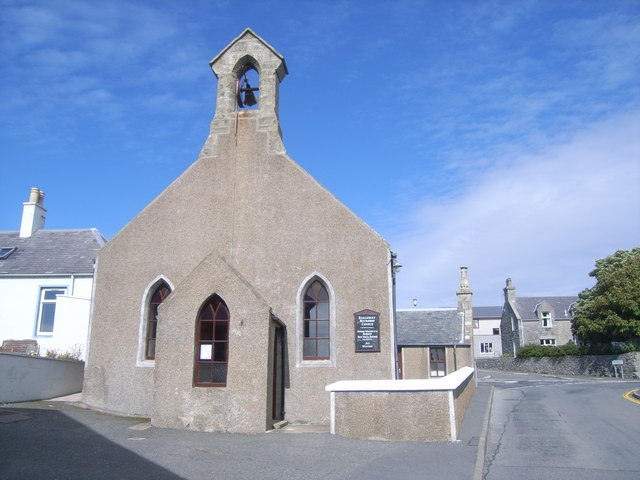
Scalloway Methodist Church, Shetland, one of the areas where Methodism put down extensive roots

In the nineteenth century the country began to gain relatively large numbers of non-conformist churches and congregations, which were evangelical in outlook. Many of these were part of organisations that originated in England and Wales. They were known in Scotland as voluntary churches, since they stood outside the established system and participation and any payments were voluntary. The Quakers had established themselves in Scotland in the seventeenth century and Baptist, Congregationalist and Methodist churches had appeared in the eighteenth century, but did not begin significant growth until the nineteenth century, partly because more radical and evangelical traditions already existed within the Church of Scotland and the free churches. The Congregationalists organised themselves into a union in 1812, the Baptists, who were divided into Calvinists and non-Calvinist tendencies, did the same in 1869. The Methodist Church had probably been limited by its anti-Calvinist theology, but made advances in the century, particularly in Shetland. From 1879, they were joined by the evangelical revivalism of the Salvation Army, which attempted to make major inroads in the growing urban centres. The Open and Exclusive Brethren entered Scotland in the late nineteenth century and the Open Brethren had 116 meetings in Scotland by 1884.

== Episcopalian Church ==
The Scottish Episcopalian Church was a combination of non-juror churches who did not accept the House of Hanover until the death of the last member of the House of Stuart in 1788, and Qualified Chapels of those that accepted the Hanoverians or were members of the Church of England resident in Scotland. A strand of evangelicalism developed in the Church in the early nineteenth century, mainly among English and Irish immigrants to Lowland towns. It was less interested in the sacramental traditions of the church and put an emphasis on communicating a simple gospel message, leading to clashes with the high church tendency within the Church. In 1843, the same year as the Great Disruption, a group in Edinburgh, under its leading figure David Drummond, broke away to form a separate English Episcopal congregation. There were fears that the schism would spread, but the departures weakened the evangelical party within the church and it never recovered its position.

== Home missions ==
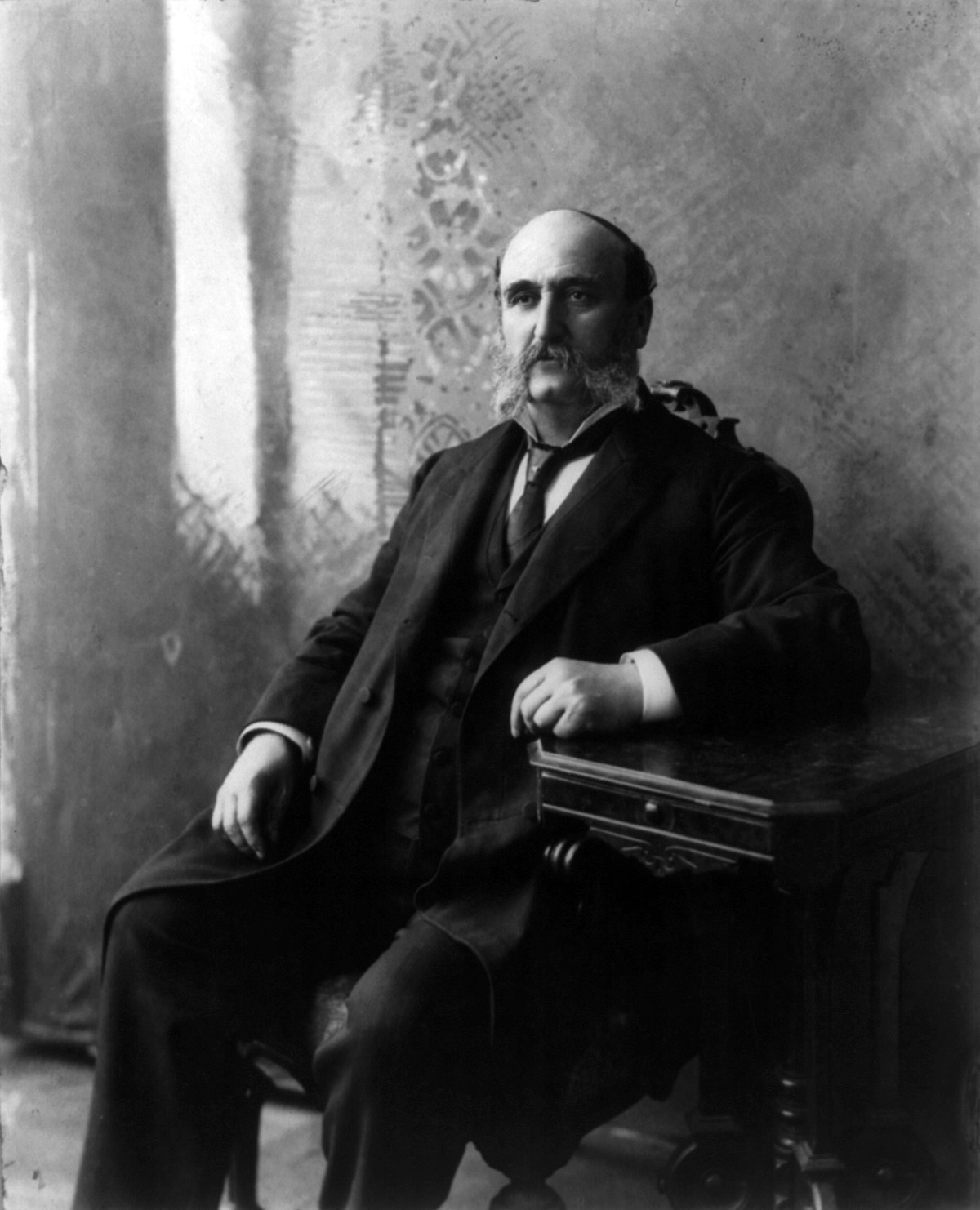
Ira D. Sankey, who with Dwight Lyman Moody helped to revitalise the movement in Scotland in the late nineteenth century

Organised missions were a major emphasis of Scottish evangelical Protestantism. In the eighteenth century the focus had been the Highlands and Islands through the Royal Bounty provided by the government and the Society in Scotland for Propagating Christian Knowledge (SSPCK), which had 229 schools in the Highlands by 1795. Gaelic school societies were founded, beginning in Edinburgh in 1811, supporting travelling schools to the northern Highlands and western Isles. In 1797 James Haldane founded the non-denominational Society for the Propagation of the Gospel at Home, whose lay-preachers established independent churches across the Highlands. When Haldane and his brother Robert accepted the principle of adult baptism in 1808 most of them became Baptist chapels. The Congregational Union of Scotland was formed in 1812 to promote home missions. In 1827 the Baptists consolidated their efforts in the Baptist Home Missionary Society. In 1824 the government provided funds to build 32 churches and 41 manses in the Highlands. After the Disruption in 1843 most of the expansion was in new churches established by the Free Church.

Missions to fishermen and seamen began with the Seamen's Friend Societies. In the cities much of the work was interdenominational. The first urban mission was founded by David Nasmith in Glasgow in 1826 and drew on all the Protestant churches. Chalmers' experiment in St. John's, Glasgow, published in The Christian and Civic Economy of Large Towns (1821–26), provided a model of urban mission based on lay visitation. It was widely adopted by the Free Church after the Disruption and would be taken up by the Church of Scotland under the leadership of A. H. Charteris in the 1870s. The visit of American evangelists Ira D. Sankey and Dwight Lyman Moody in 1874–75 revitalised the evangelical mission, leading to the founding of the Glasgow United Evangelistic Association. The Tent Hall was opened on Glasgow Green in the city in 1876, which hosted poor relief, serving 1,000 breakfasts a day, and evangelical meetings. The Faith Mission was founded in 1886 by John George Govan as a non-denominational mission focusing on rural society. Charteris was instrumental in the foundation of the Women's Guild in 1887, which underlined the role of women in the missions. They also acted as Biblewomen, reading scriptures, and in teaching Sunday schools. The Bible Training Institute for training lay evangelists was founded in 1892.

== Overseas missions ==
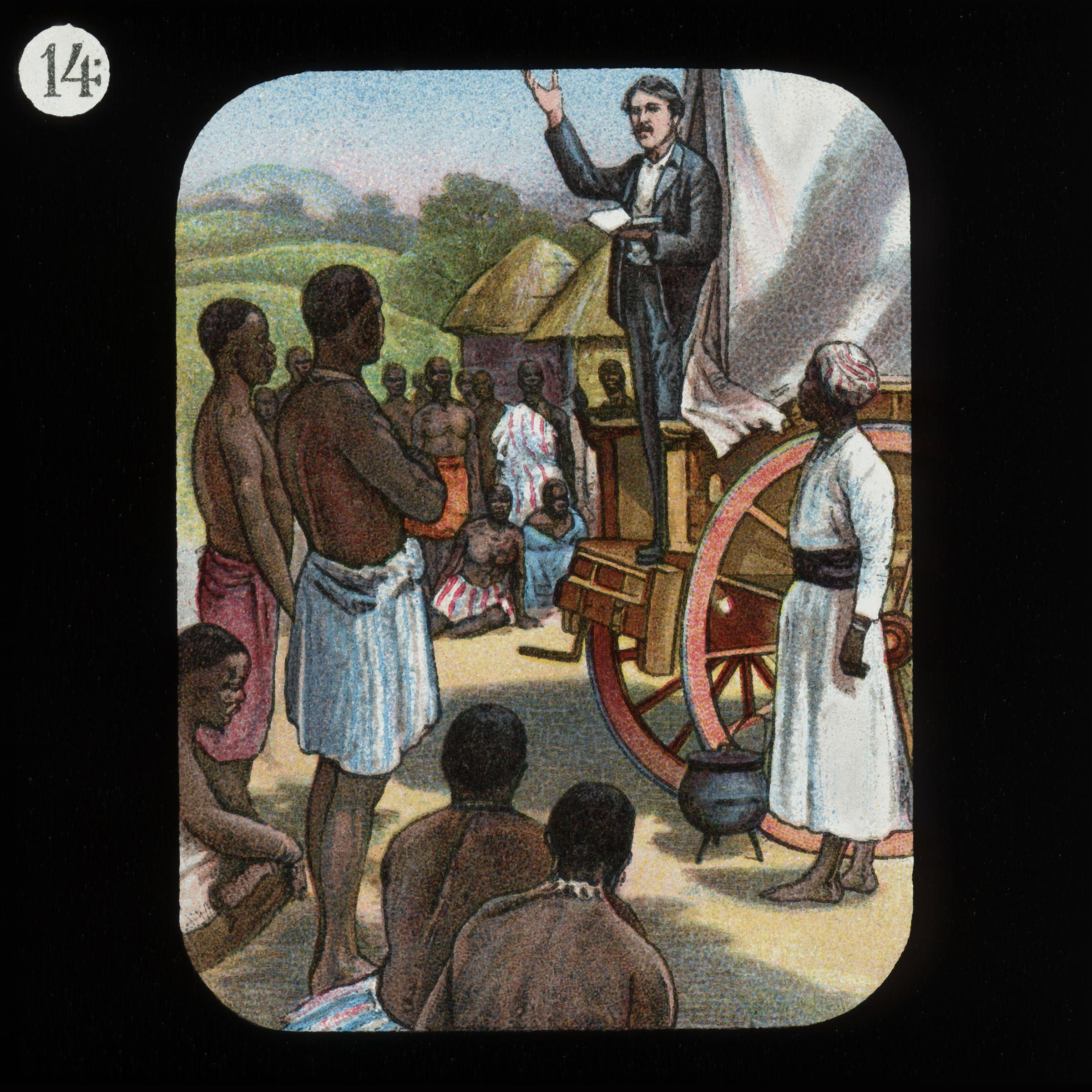
David Livingstone preaching from a wagon in one of the illustrations that were used at home to relate missionary work to audiences in Britain

The Scottish churches were relatively late to take up the challenge of foreign missions. The most famous Scottish missionary, David Livingstone, was not funded from his home country, but by the London Missionary Society. After his "disappearance" and death in the 1870s he became an icon of evangelic outreach, self-improvement, exploration and a form of colonialism. The legacy of Livingstone can be seen in the names of many mission stations founded following his example, such as Blantyre (the place of Livingstone's birth) for the Church of Scotland and Livingstonia for the Free Church, both now in Malawi. As well as the cult of Livingstone, Scottish missionary efforts were also fuelled by the rivalry between different denominations in Scotland, and may have helped distract from problems at home. The missions were popularised at home by publications and illustrations, often particularly designed to appeal to children, and through the new medium of the magic lantern show, shown to audiences in church halls throughout the country.

== Decline ==
The evangelical effort began to decline in intensity in the final decades of the nineteenth century, both in Scotland and in major cities throughout the UK. There began to be shortages of volunteers and funds for a large number of organisations. Reasons for this transformation that have been advanced include changes in leisure habits, the rise of socialism and the Labour movement, loss of middle class certainty about the validity of the gospel and its imposition on the working class as a solution to social ills. The migration of the middle classes away from inner city areas to newly built suburbs also removed them from contact with the working classes and a loss of willingness to engage in the evangelical project, particularly the new petite bourgeoisie of white collar workers and tradesmen. As a result, urban religion became dominated by the working classes themselves, with new proletarian organisations such as the United Evangelistic Associations of Glasgow and Dundee, the United Working Men's Christian Mission, the Protestant Missionary Society of Glasgow, the Salvation Army and the various temperance societies. The imposition of evangelical religion above also began to be rejected by the working classes themselves, who began to abandon attendance at organised events and visitations.

== Twentieth century ==
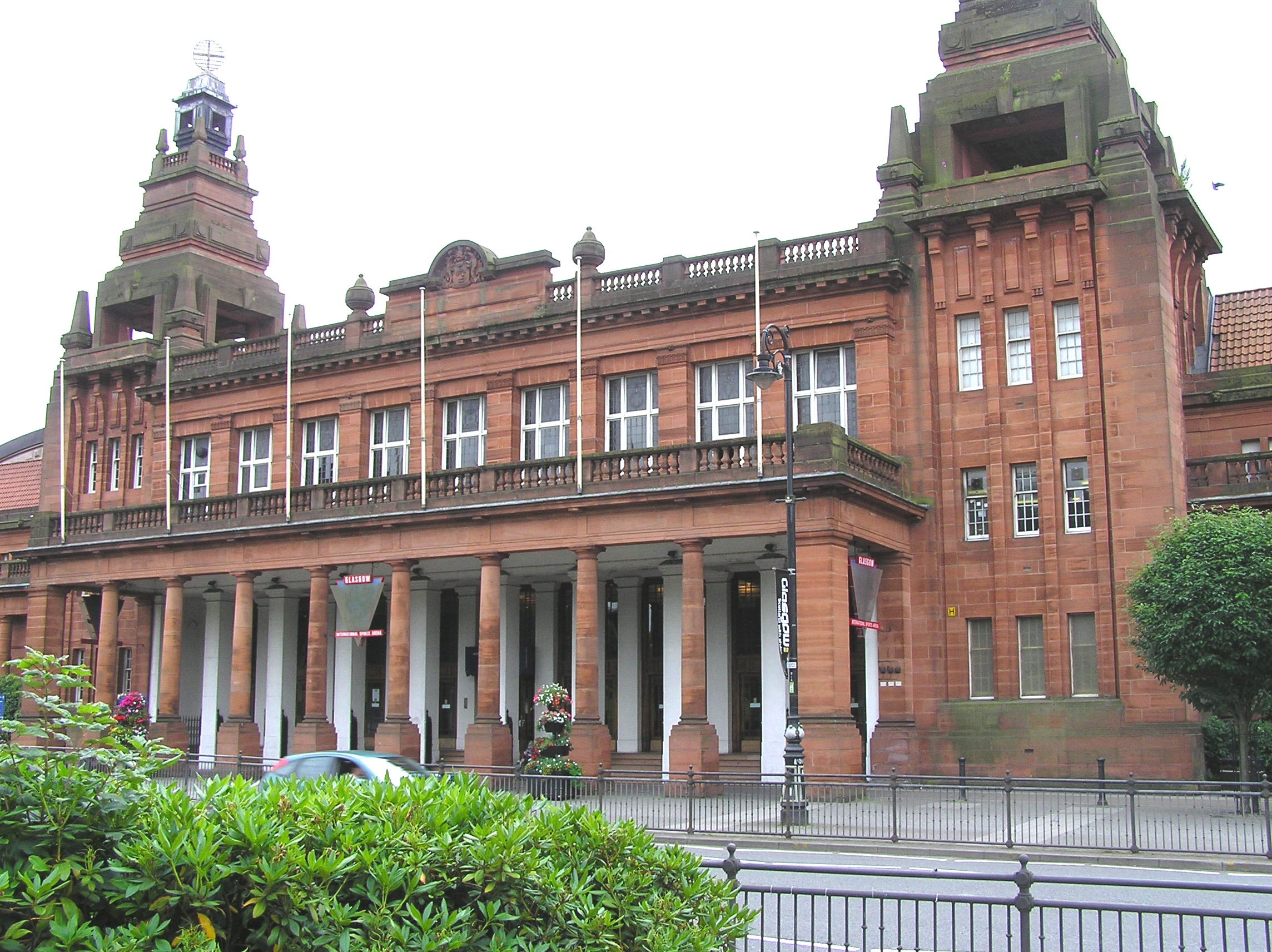
Kelvin Hall in Glasgow, which saw the climax of the Tell Scotland Movement with the Billy Graham rallies in 1955

Despite declining church attendance, evangelicalism continued into the twentieth century. There were spontaneous outbreaks of revival, such as that led by Jock Troup among fishermen of the north-east in 1921. The Herbridean revival of 1949-53 was initiated by the preaching of Faith Mission evangelist Duncan Campbell (1898-1972). There were small revivals in Tiree in 1955 and North Uist in 1958. The Tell Scotland Movement (1953–66) associated with Tom Allan and D.P. Thomson, resulted in the 1955 Billy Graham All-Scotland Crusade, climaxing at the meeting in Glasgow's Kelvin Hall. The success was great enough to temporarily arrest the decline in church attendance, which returned to almost pre-war levels. As a movement Scottish evangelicalism began to divide into those who welcomed modern knowledge and science and those that pursued a more rigidly literal view of the Bible. The divide was exemplified by the divisions among students between the more liberal Student Christian Movement and the more theologically conservative Inter-Varsity Fellowship. Gradually the more liberal followers dropped the label evangelical. However, in 1994 23 per cent of adult church goers were associated with a church that claimed to be evangelical.

== Legacy ==
Evangelicalism came to permeate Scottish society by the late nineteenth century and can be seen in areas such as the Kailyard school of literature, which moved its focus beyond the middle class to encompass the religious life of working people. The revival left a legacy of strict Sabbatarianism and helped foster local identities in the Highlands.
