= Melbourne City Mission =

Welfare organisation in Melbourne, Australia

Melbourne City Mission (MCM), known as the Community Welfare Foundation during the 1970s, is a charitable organisation in Melbourne, Australia.

== History ==
Melbourne City Mission is the city's oldest charity, having been founded in 1854. In 1850, there were only around 25,000 people in Melbourne, but this number grew rapidly to nearly 500,000, mostly men, by 1891. The rapid increase was due to the discovery of gold in the colony of Victoria, and camps and wooden shacks sprung up across Melbourne. Many people fell into poverty and succumbed to disease, and charities, which had Christian evangelism at their core, could not cope.

David Nasmith had started the City Mission movement in Glasgow, Scotland, in 1826, and by the time of his death in 1839, there were 45 such missions in Great Britain, and 36 in North America. Melbourne City Mission was the first of these, founded in 1854, and similar missions followed in Hobart, Sydney, Adelaide, Brisbane, and various regional cities. While each mission was run independently, several, including Melbourne and Sydney, adopted London City Mission as their parent body.

Philanthropists John Singleton (1808–1891), a medical doctor, and Hester Hornbrook, founder of the city's ragged schools movement, lobbied the Protestant churches and organised a public meeting on 11 August 1854, which was attended by 650 people who voted in favour of the proposal to set up a mission in the city. Their vision was "a mission embracing all denominations and unsectarian in its character" to ameliorate the hardship caused in the wake of the gold rushes. After the first attempt at the mission, which employed five missionaries, ran out of funds in 1856, a second committee was established in August of that year, initially employing just one missionary full-time.

For some time, the mission was named the Ladies' Melbourne and Suburban City Mission, and run by a Gentleman's Committee and a Ladies' Committee. The mission did much to help support women and children. The home for prostitutes and the Benevolent Ladies' Society gave general assistance and the so-called ragged schools helped to education children who were too poor to attend school. Hornbrook founded nine schools over the four years before her death in 1862. After the death of Hornbrook in 1862, the men took over the running of the mission.

Compulsory universal education was introduced in 1872, so the ragged schools were no longer necessary.

=== 20th century ===
By the end of the 1800s, the aims of the mission encompassed charitable or welfare work as well as administering residential care in institutions for those in poverty or distress.

Around 1900, the mission renewed itself, and work started to be done more from district halls. On 5 June 1902 the mission reverted to its original name. MCM worked from district halls in Brunswick, Collingwood, North Melbourne, Port Melbourne, Richmond, Fitzroy, and Carlton. Laymen became more prominent than clergy on the committees. Many of the missionaries were working-class women.

==== Institutions run by MCM ====
These included:

- 1900: Melbourne City Mission Maternity Home, in Albion Street
- c.1935: Toddlers' Home, on the same site
- Services to homeless men, led by the work of Sister Grace, at 169 Exhibition Street
- Home for "Friendless Girls" (aka Sister Grace's Auxiliary), a hostel for respectable young women looking for work
- Home for Aged Women, in Collingwood (in the former Home for Fallen and Friendless Women set up by Singleton)
- Pilgrim's Rest, in Fairfield

In 1926, the mission moved into a new building at 280 Exhibition Street, a former hotel. It included dormitory accommodation for up to 30 "friendless girls". The hostel was known by various names, including the Haven of Hope and Sister Grace's Home for Friendless Girls.

Happy Days was a seaside respite home for children "in delicate health", in Black Rock, run by MCM for about five years after its opening on 4 March 1933.

In 1943, MCM took over the management of the Elizabeth Fry Retreat (which had been opened by Sarah Swinborn in January 1885 for women leaving gaol, although its purpose had changed over time) in South Yarra from the Quakers, a home for "wayward girls"; renamed Swinborn Lodge in 1957 and under MCM until 1970.

In 1949, the mission described itself as "an interdenominational institution registered with the Charities Board of Victoria operating amongst the poor, outside the Churches, supported by voluntary contributions".

The Maternity and Toddlers' Homes in Brunswick merged to form Hartnett House in around 1955, which lasted until 1970.

From the 1960s a more professional social welfare approach was adopted, with a focus on structural and policy issues causing social problems, which led to a change of name in 1970 to the Community Welfare Foundation. However this was not successful and the name reverted in 1979. With more women going out to work from this time, the number of volunteers decreased, and were replaced by professional social workers. Those who were helped were termed clients, and had more agency in determining what type of help they received. Hartnett House was used less as a residence as single mothers were supported to stay in their own homes. The funding model changed too: by 1970, 30 per cent of MCM's funding came from government agencies, increasing to 80 per cent by 1988. Fundraising was carried out mainly by church women, and op shops also brought in some funds. The focus gradually changed to employment and housing for young people, and supporting people with a disability.

=== 21st century ===
From the 1990s, the mission focused on a response to youth homelessness. In the early 2000s the spelling of the name changed from Melbourne City Mission to Melbourne Citymission, but sometime before March 2020 had reverted to the original spelling again.

MCM introduced the Step Ahead Program for people aged 16–25, whereby they could receive stable housing in fully furnished homes for up to three years, with ongoing support after they left the accommodation. This model proved so successful that the government took over funding it, with the program now known as Youth Foyers.

It also ran a program for people with an acquired brain injury called Compass, which provided a place to learn or re-learn skills and readjust to life, make friends and prepare for a return to work. However, despite its success the program was closed in 2020.

== Description and services ==
Unlike many other city missions in Australia, MCM is not part of Mission Australia.

MCM provides services to homeless people in Melbourne and throughout the state of Victoria, along with services in other areas, such as aged care, children, employment, and justice, and palliative care. Its community palliative care service was the first of its kind in Australia, set up in 1981. It aims to provide a holistic model of care, known as the Healing Oriented Framework, designed to "promote the physical, emotional, social, psychological and spiritual health and wellbeing; cultural inclusion and ongoing safety" of clients.

Its website includes an apology to the Forgotten Australians, children who were put into the care of MCM during the first half of the 20th century. Its statement says that it "deeply regrets any abuse, neglect, or lack of appropriate care and nurture of children in its care... We accept that some children did not receive the love, nurturing, and care to which they were so rightly entitled." The organisations encourages care leavers to make contact with MCM, and also offers a service to help retrieve historical records relating to children in its care.

Paul Wappet became the CEO in 2025, succeeding Vicki Sutton who served as CEO for 9 years.

== Notable clients ==
- Uncle Jack Charles, after being removed from his mother as a four-month-old infant in early 1944
