= Edinburgh City Mission =

Charitable organization in Scotland, UK

Edinburgh City Mission is a Christian charitable organisation in Scotland, UK.

== Overview ==
The aim of the charity is to share the Gospel of Jesus Christ in words and action. This is done by working in poverty relief among the inhabitants of Edinburgh and the surrounding area, particularly in deprived communities.

== History ==
Edinburgh City Mission was founded on 1 March 1832 by David Nasmith, six years after the founding of the first City Mission in the world, Glasgow City Mission.

The Mission has formerly been active in various forms of outreach, including street evangelism, setting up special events, and working in the more deprived areas of the city through Mission Halls and Drop-In Centres.

The Mission also used to run Christian Heritage Edinburgh and hosted Celtic Tours on the Royal Mile. Christian Heritage Edinburgh became an independent charity in its own right a few years ago.

== Current work ==
The Mission runs a network of seven partner church-based Foodbanks throughout Edinburgh and the surrounding area. The Foodbanks provide resources for people who are struggling to afford basic necessities, provide relational support and sign-posting to other services.

The mission has also established Soul Food meals, Salaam (support work for refugees and asylum seekers), a Storehouse food storage and distribution centre and a Clothesbank.

In the summer of 2017, the Trustees appointed Duncan Cuthill as its new CEO.

Edinburgh City Mission helped found the Care Van in association with Bethany Christian Trust in 1990 and continues to partner with Bethany with its management. Forty Edinburgh churches provide volunteer teams to run the Care Van 363 evenings a year, and other volunteers run it 250 lunch-times a year.
