= Nathaniel Pidgeon =

Irish missionary (1803–1879)

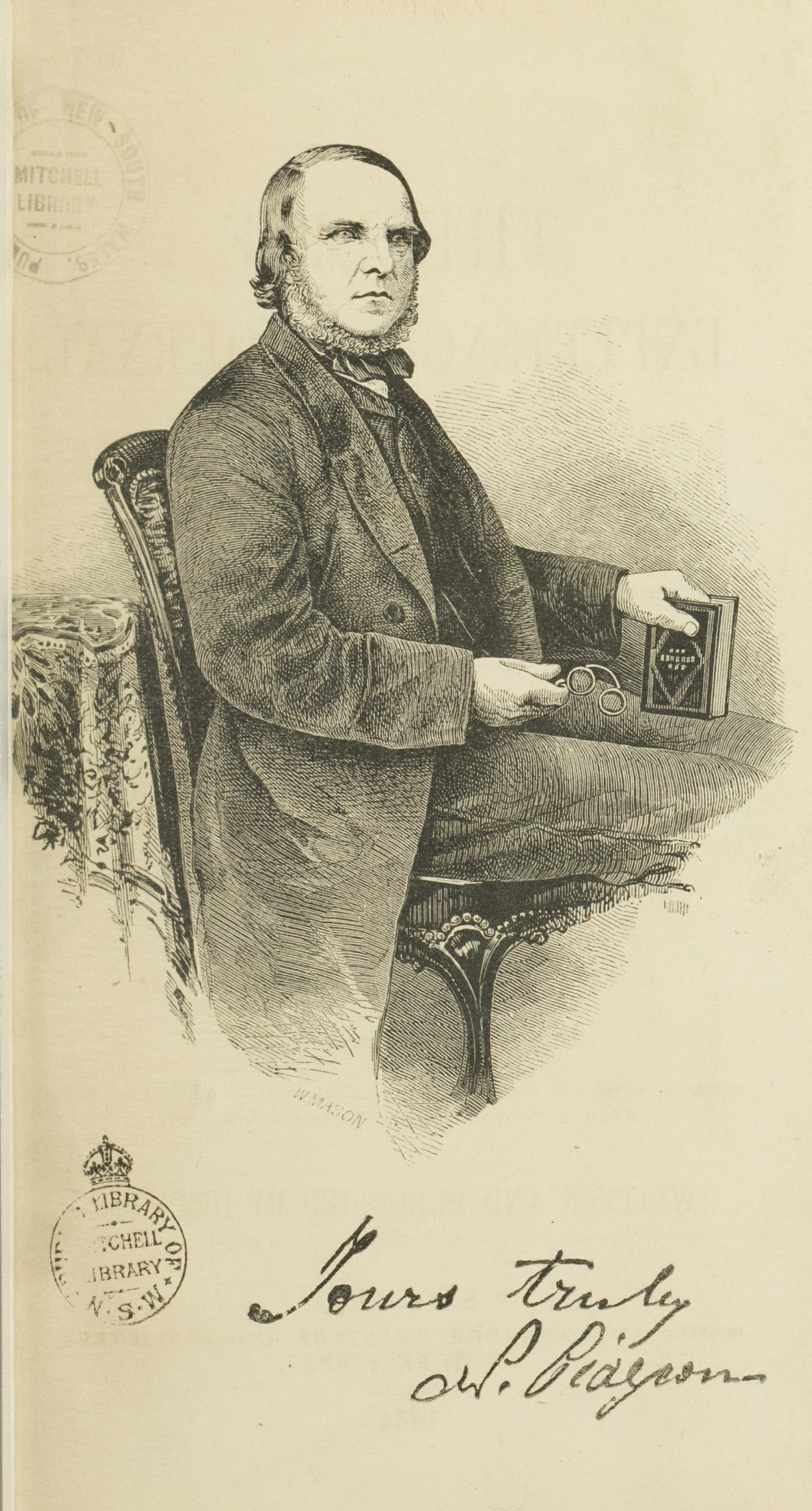
- Born: 16 August 1803; Bellevue, County Wexford, Ireland
- Died: 17 February 1879 (aged 75); Milsons Point, New South Wales, Australia
- Known for: Sydney's first missionary
- Spouse: Eliza Proud
- Parent(s): Richard Pidgeon and Eliza Foley

Nathaniel Pidgeon (16 August 1803 – 17 February 1879) was an Irish born Australian evangelist and is regarded as Sydney's first missionary.

== Early life ==
Pidgeon was born in Bellevue, County Wexford, Ireland, the only son of Richard Pidgeon and Elizabeth Foley. The family were converted in Ireland in the 1820s and were active in the Methodist Church.

Whilst a lay preacher he married Eliza Proud, whose ancestors had helped John Wesley in Ireland.

Pidgeon emigrated to Australia with fifteen family members arriving into Sydney aboard the Orestes on 14 May 1841. It was a difficult voyage with his father dying at sea and two of his sister's children.

== Working life ==
Pidgeon was a cabinet maker by profession. He secured employment shortly after his arrival in Sydney with a firm in Jamison Street, earning eight shilling a day. He combined his work with lay preaching until 1850 when he sold his business and became a full-time city missionary.

== Ministry ==
=== Evangelism ===
In his early days in Sydney he linked up with the Australian Methodists who granted him permission to preach and conduct an open-air ministry. He assembled a team of helpers who distributed tracts, held evangelistic meetings and extended their outreach to include sailors and immigrants.

=== City Missionary ===
Pidgeon established the Christian City Mission in 1850, the first independent outreach in Sydney. The Mission was supported by donations and operated independently until 1853.

The pioneering work was inspired by the City Mission Movement which had its origins in Glasgow in 1826 led by David Nasmith. Lay people without theological training preached to the city poor whilst rendering charitable services. In Sydney Nathaniel Pidgeon served the poor in the worst streets and slums in and around The Rocks.

The Wesleyan Methodist Church assumed responsibility in 1854 with Pidgeon effectively becoming the first missionary in Sydney.

His mission work combined charitable work with evangelism. He served the destitute, sick and outcast of the inner-city assisting those in entrenched poverty. The Mission set up a poor-fund and in 1861 built a small chapel on the corner of Sussex and Liverpool Streets.

Pidgeon was to separate from the Wesleyans because of constraints placed on his ministry. Financial stress led to five trustees of different denominations to support the ministry and maintain the chapel as a non-denominational place of worship for the city poor. Pidgeon ministered in the chapel until 1875.

He was to build two more chapels in Paddington and Botany to extend his outreach to those in need.

== Sydney City Mission ==
Pidgeon's City Mission laid the platform for the Sydney City Mission formed in 1862. He saw it as extending his work and attended Sydney City Mission Committee meetings. Pidgeon bequeathed the Sussex Street chapel to Sydney City Mission on his death.

== Later life ==
Pidgeon published his autobiography in 1857, revised and republished in 1864: “The life, experience, & journal of Nathaniel Pidgeon: who has been upwards of twenty years, an open-air preacher and city missionary in the city of Sydney”

Nathaniel Pidgeon died at Milsons Point on 17 February and was buried at Rookwood Cemetery on 19 February 1879.

== See also ==
- Benjamin Short
- London City Mission
- Mission Australia
