= Benjamin Short =

- Born: 19 April 1833; London, England
- Died: 10 June 1912 (aged 79); Petersham, New South Wales
- Known for: Inaugural agent for the Australian Mutual Provident Society (AMP)
- Notable work: Co-founder of Sydney City Mission
- Board member of: Australian Mutual Provident Society (1892-5; 1896-1912)
- Spouses: Elizabeth Thomas (m. 1856; dec'd. 1887); Elizabeth Jane Cantilo (m. 1890)

Benjamin Short (19 April 1833 – 10 June 1912) was an English-born Australian insurance salesman and congregationalist evangelist.

== Early life ==
He was born in London to spice merchant William Short and Elizabeth Smith. He worked as a coachbuilder in England, and migrated to Sydney in 1860 to work in insurance. He had married Elizabeth Thomas on 22 July 1856; they had nine children.

== Working life ==
He was the first canvasser for the Australian Mutual Provident Society (AMP), and by the 1870s was lecturing on life insurance around New South Wales, Victoria and New Zealand. In 1881 he returned to Sydney as chief metropolitan agent for AMP, and in 1886 he retired to Bowral, New South Wales.

In 1887 and 1891 Short unsuccessfully ran for the AMP Board, winning on a reform platform in 1892. He lowered interest rates and equalised insurance for men and women; he retired due to limited terms in 1895 and was re-elected in 1896, and with the abandonment of limited terms served until his death. He was also involved in politics, running unsuccessfully for the New South Wales Legislative Assembly as a Free Trader in 1894 and 1895.

== Sydney City Mission ==
Short's involvement with religion began in London with the London City Mission. He co-founded the Sydney City Mission in 1862 and was its secretary from 1863 to 1868. He was also a member of YMCA.

== Later life ==
In his retirement became a travelling evangelist. His wife died in 1887 and he married Elizabeth Jane Cantilo on 20 January 1890. Short died of influenza at Petersham in 1912.

== See also ==
- Mission Australia
- Nathaniel Pidgeon
