= Valerie Howarth, Baroness Howarth of Breckland =

British social worker and life peer (1940–2025)

The Right Honourable The Baroness Howarth of Breckland OBE
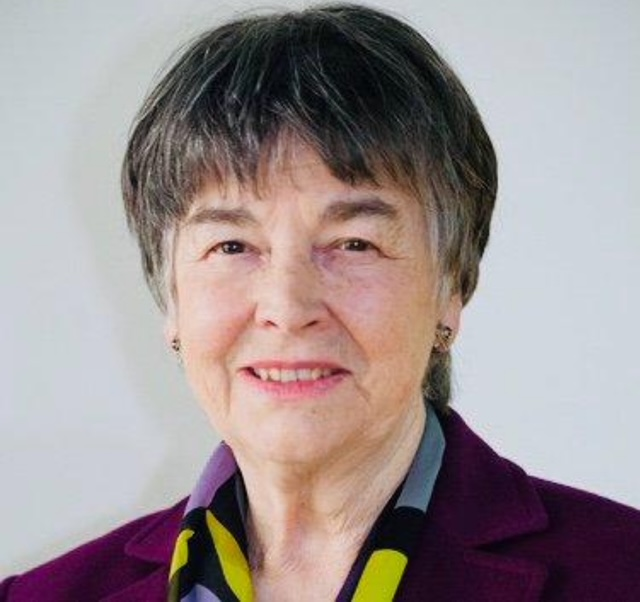
- Howarth in 2001
- Born: Valerie Georgina Howarth; 5 September 1940; Sheffield, England
- Died: 23 March 2025 (aged 84); Norfolk, England
- Education: Abbeydale Girls' Grammar School; University of North London; Henley Business School
- Alma mater: Leicester University
- Occupations: social worker; chief executive; charity trustee; House of Lords crossbencher
- Years active: 1963–2024
- Spouse: Barbara Lees

Member of the House of Lords
- Lord Temporal
- Life peerage 25 June 2001 – 23 March 2025

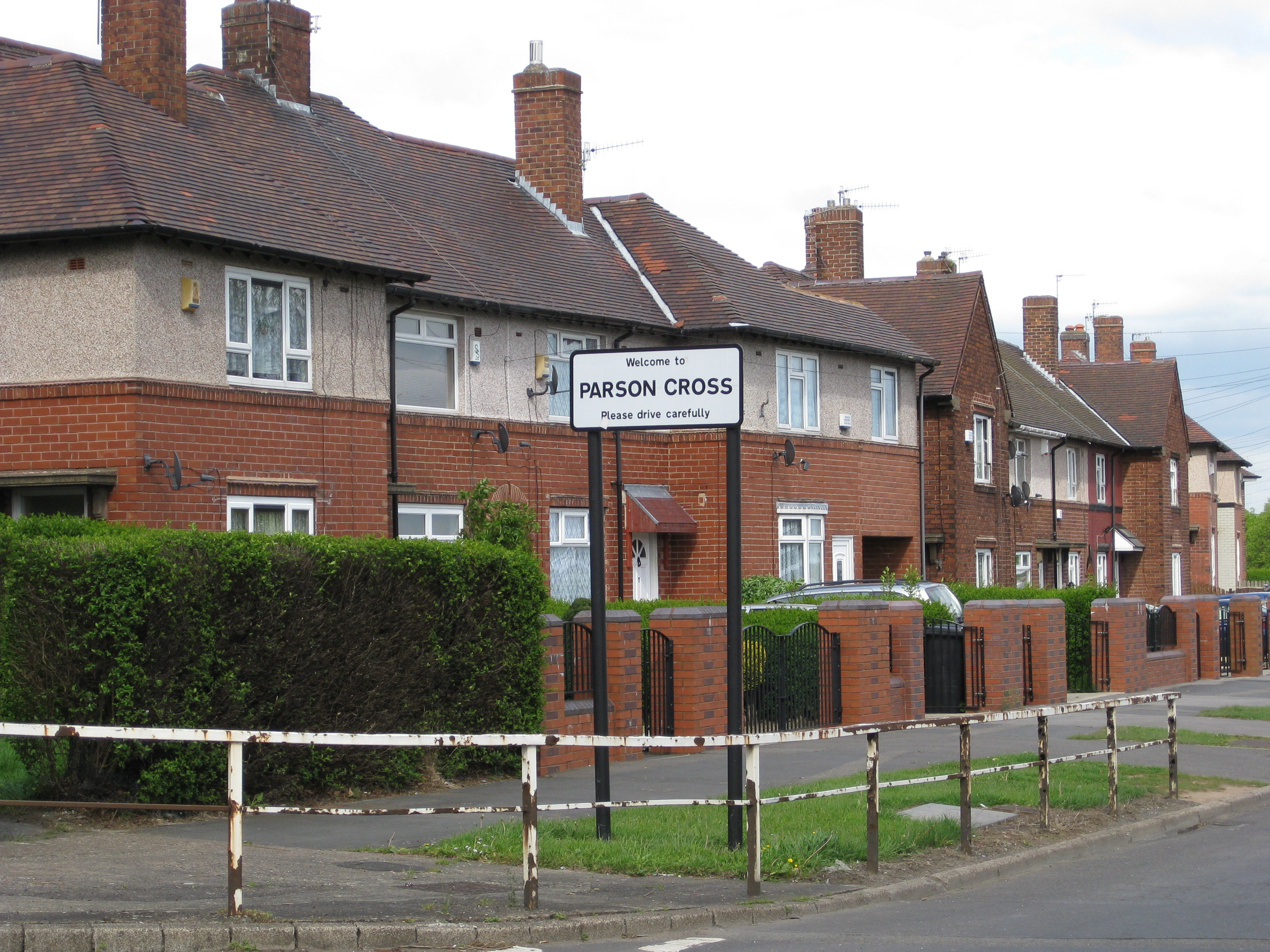
Parson Cross, in South Yorkshire, Lady Howarth's birthplace

Valerie Georgina Howarth, Baroness Howarth of Breckland, OBE (5 September 1940 – 23 March 2025) was a British social worker, first chief executive of Childline, child and adult welfare advocate and a crossbench member of the House of Lords.

Her illustrious career was almost de-railed, midway, in the aftermath of the death of a child on an 'At Risk register' in the statutory London authority where she had led the service, but she was exonerated in the subsequent inquiry, and was able later to diversify her contribution to numerous Third sector organisations and to public policy. Her discovery, through her work at Childline, of the suspected pervasiveness of child abuse, and specifically of child sexual abuse in society - and how it was then being fostered by prison life and burgeoning media - led her to call in 1990 for a Royal Commission to look into the sexual abuse of minors. It took another 25 years before a Public Inquiry, known as the Independent Inquiry into Child Sexual Abuse, was set up by the then Home Secretary, Theresa May, to look into the matter in England and Wales.

== Background ==
Valerie Howarth, the elder daughter of Sheffield steelworker, George and his wife Edith, was born early on during World War II. She had described her background as 'tough', but academic and organisational ability enabled her to attend Abbeydale Girls’ Grammar School where she became head girl. Musing about becoming a probation officer, she completed a diploma in social studies at the University of Leicester in 1962, followed by a certificate in applied social studies in 1963. On graduating, Valerie Howarth was hired by the charitable Family Welfare Association, FWA, to work with disorganised and poverty stricken families in Leicester, where violence was a common hallmark. There she met Barbara Lees, a senior colleague and later a social services training officer, who was to have a defining influence on the young Howarth's life.

== Career ==
After five years with the FWA in the Midlands, Howarth moved to London where in 1968 she gained a certificate in childcare at the then North London Polytechnic, now the University of North London, and joined the London Borough of Lambeth Children's Services Department, in South London, to work in their families unit. This was on the eve of the major reforms being ushered in by the Seebohm Report. One of her trainees at the time was Tessa Jowell, a future Labour minister. After the Seebohm shake-up, three separate departments were unified bringing together distinct client groups, children, adult disabled and elderly and adult mental health sufferers, to achieve economies of scale and Howarth played a part in managing the fieldwork transition in the authority. During her 14-year stint with Lambeth, she rose to the position of assistant director in a populous borough stretching from Waterloo and County Hall, opposite the Houses of Parliament, to the leafy suburbs of Streatham and Norwood.

=== Jasmine Beckford Inquiry ===
In 1982 Howarth landed the job of director of Social services with the London Borough of Brent in North West London. Two years into the role, a 4-year old girl, Jasmine Beckford, died of her injuries at the hands of her mother and step-father, while being monitored through the 'at risk' social work process. The ensuing inquiry into the circumstances led to public interest and media publicity. Howarth elected to apply to a quieter authority, Cambridgeshire where she was initially offered the post of director, and resigned from Brent. However, criticisms emanating from politicians of one party at Brent Council, led to the Cambridge offer being withdrawn, despite the Beckford inquiry chairman, Louis Blom-Cooper QC, describing Howarth as a "high quality director of social services" and the inquiry report absolving her of any blame.

=== Unemployment ===
Having left the public sector in 1986, Valerie Howarth returned to academia for a year at Henley Business School. She became a freelance able to advise welfare and housing institutions on management and the effects on clients.

=== Childline ===
When the UK television presenter and consumer advocate, Esther Rantzen, devised a special telephone helpline for distressed children in the late 1980s, she needed someone experienced to lay the foundations and lead the service. Her sister had been a colleague of Valerie Howarth's in Lambeth and suggested they have a conversation. It led to the appointment of Howarth as the founding chief executive and a dozen years at the helm. During that time, the veil was lifted from the extent and depth of childhood suffering both in families and institutions and Howarth raised the alarm in public. The children's helpline phenomenon spread across the UK and was taken up in Commonwealth countries and in Europe. As a result, Howarth came into contact with myriad organisations, including the Faithful Foundation in an effort to prevent child abuse. Her effectiveness as a leader in a fast changing international communications context led to her becoming the first UK representative on the European Forum for Child Welfare and a founding member and first Chair of the Telephone Helplines Association. Her efforts extended to consumer protection and standard-setting, serving on the Independent Committee for the Supervision of Standards of Telephone Information Services, (ICSTIS).

=== Parliament ===
Baroness Howarth had several formal memberships in the House of Lords, Including:

- European Union Committee 2007-2012
- Adoption Legislation Committee 2012-2013
- Ecclesiastical (Joint) Committee 2015-2023
- She was secretary to the All Party Parliamentary Group for Children
- Member of the All Party Parliamentary Group on Ageing and Older People

=== Other roles ===
Valerie Howarth was a trustee for a number of Children's charities, and was a patron of the National Youth Advocacy Scheme. She became the Chair of Cafcass, Children and Family Court Advisory and Support Service and was instrumental in helping it recover from internal conflicts and organisational difficulties.

In relation to adult services, she was a campaigner to the last, and established the King’s Cross Homelessness Project, and played a pivotal role in the London Homelessness Forum. She championed for specialist housing for the elderly and was vice-chair of the National Care Standards Commission. She also served on the board of the Food Standards Agency.

Between 2016 and 2018 Howarth chaired the Safeguarding Committee of the Diocese of Norwich, her local see in Norfolk, where she had settled in a village and where she worshipped.

Baroness Howarth's commitment to people living with disability was reflected in her work for the UK's largest Christian charity in the sector, Livability, where she was a trustee and vice-president.

== Personal life and death ==
With two friends, in midlife, she acquired a cottage in Norfolk to which she and Barbara Lees would eventually retire. Howarth was a supporter of civil union and in 2006, she and Lees became civil partners. Barbara Lees died in 2021.

Lady Howarth died on 23 March 2025, after living and working with cancer for a period of years, at the age of 84.

== Honours ==
- Valerie Howarth was appointed an Officer of the Order of the British Empire (OBE) in the 1999 Birthday Honours for services to ChildLine
- On 25 June 2001, she was created a life peer with the title Baroness Howarth of Breckland, of Parson Cross in the County of South Yorkshire.
- In 2007, Baroness Howarth was awarded an Honorary Doctorate by the Open University in recognition of her decades long public service on behalf of children.

== See also ==
- Care (2000 TV film)
- PSA
- Firth Park (ward)#Parson Cross
