= Livability (charity) =

British disability charity

Livability is a national disability charity based in the UK and is the country's largest Christian disability charity. The charity was formed in 2007 after a merger between the Shaftesbury Society and John Grooms. The Archbishop of Canterbury, Justin Welby, became President of the organization in 2013 and the previous Archbishop of Canterbury, Rowan Williams, was its vice-president.

== History ==
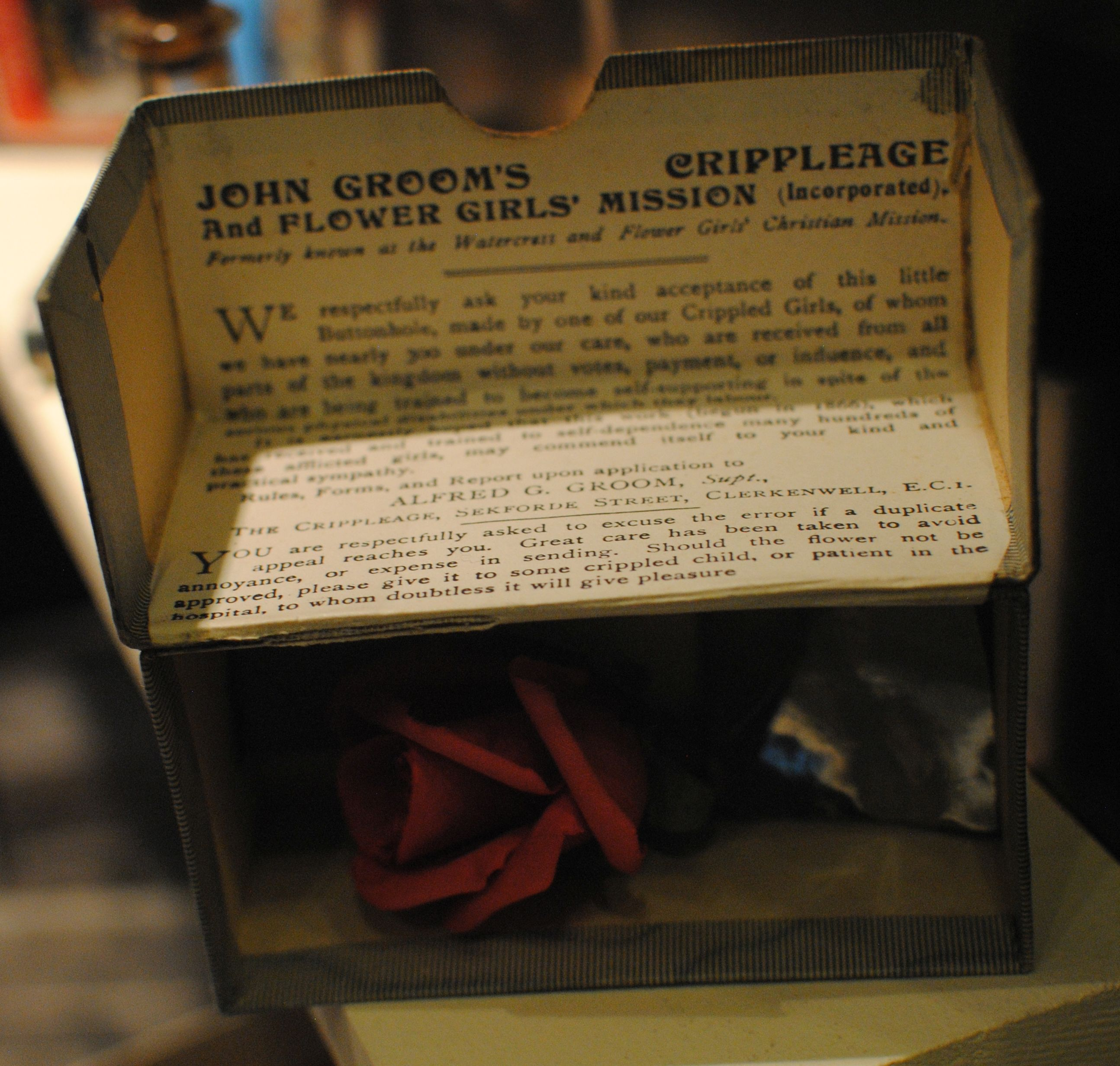
An artificial rose distributed to raise funds by John Groom's Crippleage and Flower Girls' Mission

John Alfred Groom (1845–1919) was a philanthropist who founded the Watercress and Flower Girls' Christian Mission (later "John Groom's Crippleage and Flower Girls' Mission"), in 1866. In 1872 the social reformer Lord Shaftesbury established the Emily Loan Fund to enable young women flower sellers to support themselves. Later, in 1914, the Ragged School Union merged into the Shaftesbury Society, becoming fully subsumed under the title of the Shaftesbury Society in 1944.

In 2007, the two charities merged and combined their experience in care, education and employment support to create the disability charity Livability.

== Services ==
Livability provides a number of services for disabled people across the country. These include education services such as school and colleges, care homes, specialist rehabilitation services, holidays for disabled people, employment advice and training courses.

Livability also works with entrepreneurs to acquire the skills necessary to run a business. They provide workshops and training courses which cover business planning, book-keeping and marketing.

In December 2014 Livability acquired Holton Lee in Dorset - now Livability Holton Lee. Livability Holton Lee is a large, predominantly outdoor area which is to be used for accessible holidays as well as being a venue for weddings and art exhibitions.

== Community engagement and church work ==
Livability’s community engagement team supports churches and Christian projects in disadvantaged urban areas by running courses providing resources, practical support and training courses.

In 2015 Livability worked with the Christian charity Mind and Soul to produce the Mental Health Access Pack. The Mental Health Access Pack is an online resource created to help church leaders make their churches fully accessible to people with mental health issues. Katharine Welby-Roberts, the daughter of Archbishop Justin Welby and ex-Livability employee, helped to launch the Pack. In an interview in January 2015 she said: "Churches have a responsibility to welcome everyone who comes to them in Christ's name, but the reality is that they don't always know how best to support people who are struggling with mental health issues. The Mental Health Access Pack will help equip churches to make God's love more visible in the welcome they offer to every person."

== Patrons ==
Notable patrons and supporters of Livability include: Anne, Princess Royal (Patron); Justin Welby, Archbishop of Canterbury (President); Valerie Howarth (Senior Vice President and Trustee); Esther Rantzen (Vice President); and Pam Rhodes (Vice President). Harry Redknapp has also attended events in support of Livability.
