= Dublin Christian Mission =

Irish charity

Dublin Christian Mission is a non-denominational charity in Dublin, Ireland. It works to meet the physical and spiritual needs of the local community.

== History ==
The Dublin Christian Mission is the amalgamation of three older Missions located in Dublin, Ireland, in 1965: the Dublin City Mission (founded 1828), the Dublin Medical Mission (1891) and the Dublin Mission (1953). It is the second oldest in the world.

In 1826, David Nasmith founded his first city mission in Glasgow. Two years later, Naismith founded the Dublin City Mission at Merchants Hall, Wellington Quay in Dublin, a similar organization. Other missions followed throughout Naismith's life, including one in London in 1835.

In 1879, the Mission relocated to Anglesea Street, constructing a main hall and a number of offices. By 1903, seventy five years after its founding, the Dublin Mission had eleven full-time missionaries under the leadership of Rev. J.C. Irwin.

In December 1939, the Mission once again relocated to newly built headquarters in Cashel Road, Crumlin, an area which had grown to some 13,000 residents in the past thirty years. This area was chosen because the Dublin Corporation had built almost 4,000 houses for working-class families nearby. Another factor came from a fall in attendance at the location at Anglesea Street as people migrated from the centre of the city. Crumlin Hall was later sold to the Brethren Assembly in the area. Some years after it was sold again to the Dublin Corporation, the current property owner.

== Current work ==
Dublin Christian Mission offers several services, operating the largest independent Christian Youth work in Dublin with over 300 young people making over 1,000 calls to the Youth Centre.

The mission runs a cafe for homeless people, a drop-in centre, youth services and a summer camp.

== Awards ==
In 2021 DCM won the EU Business Irish Enterprise Award.
