= Ragged School Museum =

Museum in Tower Hamlets, London, England

Coordinates: 51.5188°N 0.0357°W

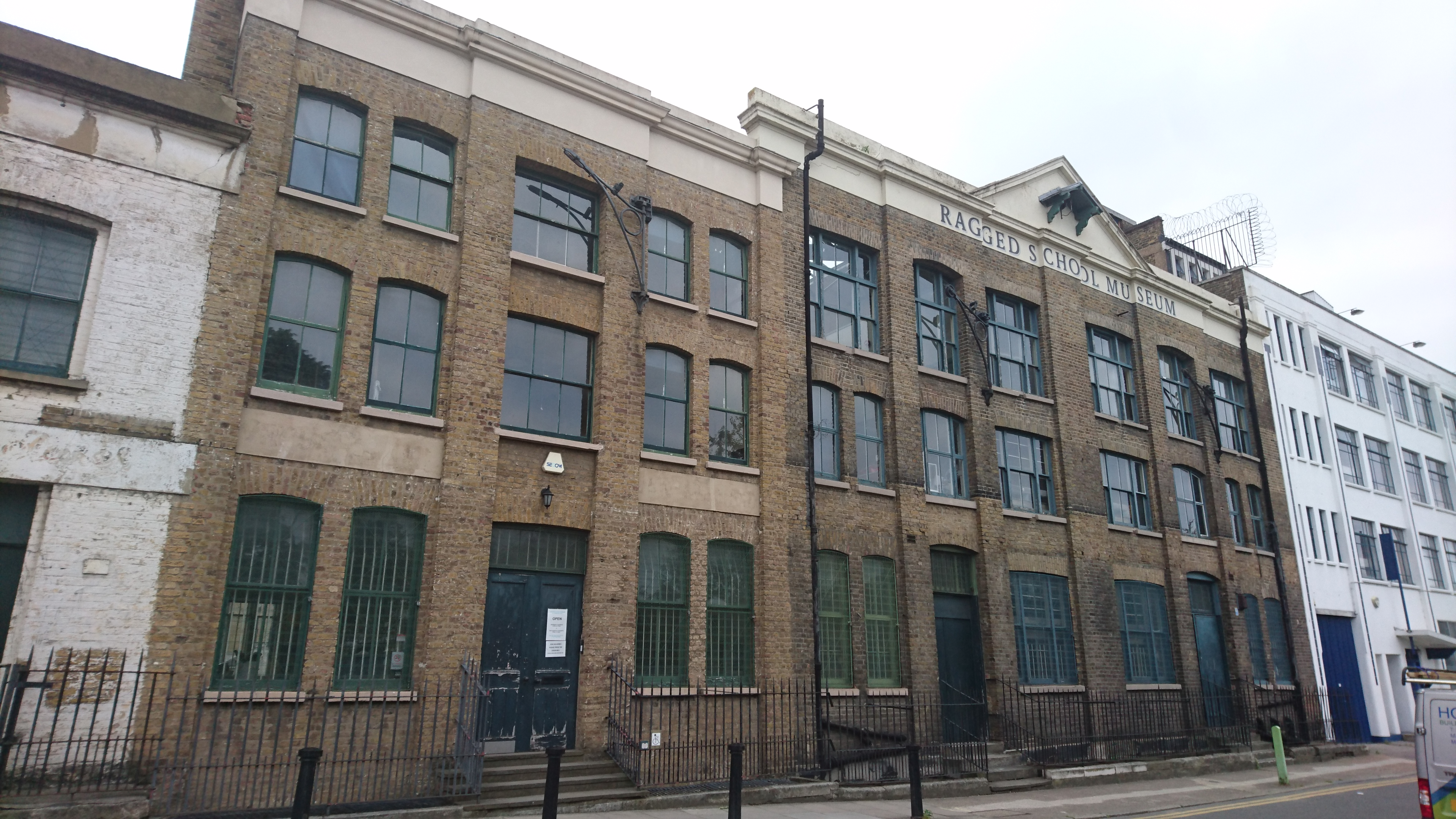
The Ragged School Museum in 2005.

The Ragged School Museum is a museum in the London Borough of Tower Hamlets. The museum was opened in 1990 in the premises of the former Dr Barnardo's Copperfield Road Ragged School. The school opened in 1877 to serve the children of Mile End with a basic education. It was the largest of its kind at the time. It closed in 1908 when sufficient government/London County Council schools had been established to take over the work. At its height the school had more than 1,000 pupils on weekdays, and 2,400 Sunday school attendees. The team continued to organise events for the local community even after the school closed. The building saw later use as a factory.

The museum is housed in three canalside warehouses at 46–50 Copperfield Road. The buildings were saved from demolition in the 1980s by local residents and a trust set up to manage the property in 1990. In December 2016 it was awarded a £4.3m restoration grant by the Heritage Lottery Fund.

The museum, which is run by volunteers, seeks to record the establishment in 1844 of the London Ragged School Union and to recreate the experience of how Victorian children would have been taught. It features a reconstructed Victorian classroom and a typical East End kitchen from 1900. Gallery areas also introduce local and cultural history of the East End.

The buildings face Mile End Park.
