= City Mission =

Christian movement

The City Mission movement started in Glasgow in January 1826 when David Nasmith founded the Glasgow City Mission (Scotland). It was an interdenominational agency working alongside churches and other Christian agencies to provide for the spiritual and material welfare of those in need.

Agencies in the movement are variously called "City" or "Gospel" or "Rescue" Missions.

== History ==
Nasmith visited the United States and Canada in 1830, setting up 31 missions supported by various benevolent institutions. He founded missions in France, as well as the London City Mission, the London Female Mission, the Dublin Christian Mission, and a number of other ministries.

The first World Conference of City Missions was sponsored by the Sydney City Mission (now Mission Australia) and held in Sydney, Australia, in 1988.

Subsequent conferences were held in:

- Birmingham, England, 1991 – this formed the City Mission World Association (CMWA)
- Washington, DC, US, 1994
- Helsinki, Finland, 1997
- Glasgow, Scotland, 2000
- Sydney, Australia, 2003
- Kansas City, Missouri, US, 2006

== National bodies ==
- Australia – Mission Australia (formed 1996, after city missions had been created across the country since 1852)
- US – Association of Gospel Rescue Missions (founded 1913)
- UK and Ireland – City Mission Movement UK (formerly British Association of City Missions)
