= Mission Australia =

National Christian charity providing community services

- Predecessor: Sydney City Mission (1862; 164 years ago); The Colporteur Society (1869; 157 years ago)
- Formation: 1996; 30 years ago
- Founder: Benjamin Short
- Founded at: Sydney
- Website: www.missionaustralia.com.au

Mission Australia is a national Christian charity that provides a range of community services throughout Australia. It has its roots in the Brisbane sector of The British and Foreign Bible Society's sub-committee, The Colporteur Society (1869), and Sydney City Mission (1862), but was only officially established in 1996, bringing together a number of city missions across the country. The organisation specialises in the areas of homelessness and housing, families and children, early learning, youth, employment and skills, substance abuse, disability, mental health, and strengthening communities. Sharon Callister has been CEO since March 2022.

== History ==
Mission Australia traces its origins back to 1869 to the Colporteur Society, later known as Brisbane Town and Country Mission, which operated at a grassroots level to respond to need within the community for food, clothing, and housing.

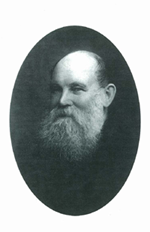
Benjamin Short

On 11 July 1862, Englishman Benjamin Short established the Sydney City Mission, desiring to address the spiritual and physical needs of the city's inhabitants who were living in poverty. In a public meeting, Short presented his vision for Sydney City Mission:

Christian friends, we have called you together because we desire to submit for your serious consideration the question, 'Is it not desirable that there be established in Sydney a City Mission, somewhat similar in character to the London City Mission?' ... We feel that something must be done, and that the Christian Churches of Sydney cannot be held guiltless if they neglect to stretch out a helping hand to rescue those who are perishing around them.

Short gained the support of many prominent citizens, including the likes of John Fairfax, and clergymen of almost every denomination. The motto "Need, Not Creed" emerged, with those present agreeing that a city as diverse as Sydney required a non-denominational City Mission.

Four missionaries were appointed in 1862 (two men and two women), with their main tasks including home visits, distributing Bibles, persuading alcoholics to turn sober, and encouraging parents to send their children to school and Sunday School.

Melbourne City Mission was founded in 1854, but is not part of Mission Australia.

Adelaide City Mission followed soon after in 1867, with a similar goal of addressing spiritual and physical need among the poor and disadvantaged in the city. For decades these and other missions met immediate needs, giving out food and clothing. As no government welfare or unemployment benefits existed, City Missions saved many families from starvation.

During the recession of 1890 and the Great Depression of the 1930s, many people in need sought help from City Missions. In the mid 20th century, City Missions shifted their collective focus towards finding long-term solutions to disadvantage.

In 1974 Perth City Mission, then known as Jesus People Welfare Services, was founded by Jeffrey J Hopp. In 1989, Hopp resigned as president and CEO of the Jesus People Inc. and established his own company Awards Australia, the charity then went on to become Perth City Mission.

In 1989 Wollongong City Mission and Wagga Wagga City Mission were founded.

In 1991, Hunter Mission was established, building on community service programs provided by Mayfield Baptist Church.

In 1996, Mission Australia officially formed, bringing together Adelaide City Mission, Hunter Mission, Perth City Mission, Sydney City Mission, Wagga Wagga City Mission and Wollongong City Mission. Brisbane City Mission joined soon after in 1998.

In 2000, Mission Australia's Northern Territory and Tasmania state offices opened, followed by Victoria in 2002.

In 2008, Mission Australia Housing was established.

The following lists names of organisations that have merged and amalgamated over time to form Mission Australia:

- Adelaide City Mission, later known as Mission SA
- Canberra City Mission
- Hunter Mission
- Jesus People Welfare Services, later known as Perth City Mission
- Mission Australia Group Training and Mission Employment
- Mission Australia Limited
- Mission Australia Southern NSW
- NSW Country Services
- Sydney City Mission
- Town and Country Mission, later known as Brisbane City Mission
- Wagga Wagga City Mission
- Wollongong City Mission

== Description ==
In 2022–23, Mission Australia employed approximately 2,400 staff and 1,000 volunteers, and supported 149,096 children, young people, adults and elderly people across 463 programs and services. The organisation specialises in the areas of homelessness and housing, families and children, early learning, youth, employment and skills, alcohol and other drugs, disability, mental health, and strengthening communities. Sharon Callister became CEO in March 2022, succeeding James Toomey, who served as CEO from November 2017.

== Services ==
=== Homelessness and housing ===
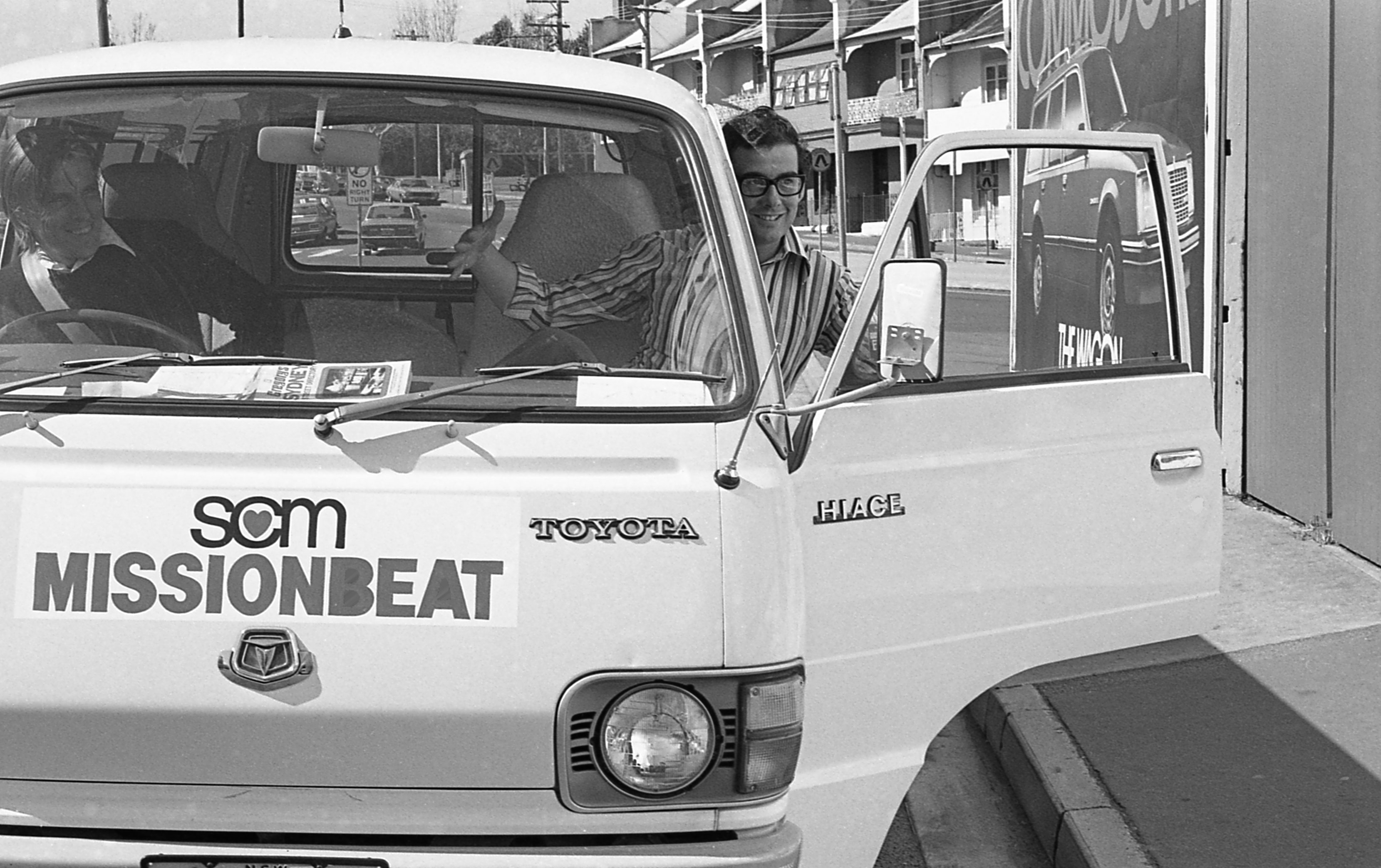
Missionbeat 1979

Mission Australia offers specialist support services that enable people to avoid and escape homelessness. It provides crisis and transitional accommodation, as well as social and affordable housing. In 2022–23, Mission Australia assisted 26,240 people through 73 homelessness services.

In 1979, Sydney City Mission launched the Missionbeat homelessness outreach service. Missionbeat vans patrolled the city streets offering support to homeless and intoxicated individuals. The Missionbeat Sydney service continues today, with a primary focus on supporting long-term rough sleepers. Youthbeat services, which offer support to vulnerable young people on the street, operate in Tasmania and Perth, and Mission Australia has plans to launch another mobile outreach service targeting young people in the Northern Territory.

In 2008, Mission Australia established Mission Australia Housing, a Tier 1 community housing provider.

=== Families and children ===
Mission Australia provides extensive support for families and children. In 2022–23, Mission Australia assisted 21,079 people through 60 families and children services.

=== Strengthening communities ===
Mission Australia provides a network of place-based community development and early intervention and prevention programs tailored to meet the needs of local communities. These programs seek to listen to individuals and equip them to transform their communities. In 2022–23, Mission Australia assisted 20,553 people through 25 community development services.

=== Employment, education and training ===
Mission Australia helps people of all ages who have experienced barriers to employment to gain the skills and confidence to find and keep a job. It offers a variety of service models including Disability Employment Services, Transition to Work and ParentsNext. In 2022–23, Mission Australia assisted 19,402 people through 152 employment, education and training services.

=== Alcohol and other drugs ===
Mission Australia offers holistic support to people affected by alcohol and drug issues. Programs and services support individuals to overcome dependency, and seek to address the underlying factors that led to their addiction. In 2022–23, Mission Australia assisted 6,021 people though 35 alcohol and other drug services.

=== Mental health recovery ===
Mission Australia provides individual, targeted and flexible care for people with mental health issues to help them overcome the challenges they face and achieve their goals. In 2022–23, Mission Australia assisted 3,640 people through 30 mental health recovery services.

=== NDIS ===
Mission Australia is an NDIS Partner in the Community in various locations in New South Wales, Queensland, South Australia, Tasmania and Western Australia. It delivers Early Childhood Early Intervention (ECEI) and Local Area Coordination (LAC) services, helping people with disability get the supports they need and supporting their inclusion in their community. In 2022–23, Mission Australia assisted 35,054 people through 18 NDIS services.

=== Other services ===
Other areas of Mission Australia's work in addition to those listed above include support for people affected by domestic and family violence, people requiring financial support, and people linked to the justice and corrections system. In 2022–23, Mission Australia supported 9,208 people through 45 family and domestic violence, financial wellbeing, and justice and corrections services.

== Research, impact measurement, policy and advocacy ==
Mission Australia works to influence public policy relating to homelessness and disadvantage and raise awareness and support of key social issues.

=== Research ===
Mission Australia undertakes research and produces publications on the key issues affecting its services and the people who access them. Its research findings also contribute to discussions about key and emerging issues with government, in the media, and within the community services sector, academia, business and the community.

=== Youth Survey ===
Mission Australia's annual Youth Survey is Australia's largest annual survey of young people of its kind. The 22nd Annual Youth Survey saw 19,500 young people aged 15–19 participate in 2023 and identified the environment, equity and discrimination and economic and financial matters as the three most important issues in Australia today.

=== Policy and advocacy ===
Mission Australia seeks to influence policy decisions through submissions and reports that draw on evidence, the expertise of its staff, and the experiences of the people who access its services.

== Reconciliation Action Plan ==
Mission Australia launched its first Reconciliation Action Plan (RAP) in 2009. The RAP is an agreed strategy on how the organisation intends to contribute to reducing the gap in living standards between Aboriginal and Torres Strait Islander and non-Aboriginal and Torres Strait Islander Australians. Following this, Mission Australia developed a second RAP in 2017. Its third RAP, an Innovate-level RAP for 2022–23, received endorsement from Reconciliation Australia in January 2022.

== Funding ==
Mission Australia is a registered charity with the Australian Charities and Not-for-profits Commission.

The organisation receives income from federal, state and local governments, rent, fees and fundraising. In 2021–22, Mission Australia invested 88% of its income back into its programs and services.

== See also ==
- Melbourne City Mission
- Nathaniel Pidgeon
- Benjamin Short
