= Jock Troup =

John (Jock) Troup (26 May 1896 – 18 April 1954) was a well-known Christian evangelist from Fochabers, Scotland. He was the son of Harry Troup and Harriet Ross; he spent his youth as a cooper, and was part of the Territorial Force service.

Troup served in WWI as part of the Royal Naval Patrol Service based in Dublin, where he attended gospel meetings at the YMCA and decided to commit his life to Jesus; and spent some time with the Salvation Army. He enrolled at the Bible Training Institute in Glasgow in 1922.

Troup is best known for playing a large part in the Fisherman's Revival of 1921, known also as Jock Troup and the Fisherman's Revival. He preached all over Britain, looking to bring people to Christ, as described in Jackie Ritchie's book Floods Upon the Dry Ground (1983).

In 1932 he became Assistant Superintendent at the Tent Hall in Glasgow; he became full Superintendent the following year.

In the early 1950s, he joined the London Missionary Society and travelled throughout the UK and North America with the Moody Bible Institute. In 1954 Troup was speaking at a church in Spokane, Washington when he took ill in the pulpit; he died the same day.

In 2001 Revival Man, The Jock Troup Story, a book by George Mitchell, was released about the preacher, followed by a film, Jock Troup and The Fisherman's Revival.

== Family ==
Troup married Catherine Black in 1928.
