= Glasgow City Mission =

Scottish Christian charitable organisation

Glasgow City Mission is a Christian charitable organisation whose remit covers Glasgow, Scotland. It is dedicated to sharing the Gospel of Jesus Christ and providing practical help and support to homeless and disadvantaged people. Its headquarters are on Crimea Street, Glasgow with a "Child and Family Centre" in Govan and an "Overnight Welcome Centre" open during winter.

== History ==
The Mission was founded in 1826 by David Nasmith and was the first official City Mission in the world.

== Projects ==
=== Evening Drop in ===
Glasgow City Mission's city centre project in Crimea Street is open from 10am to 8pm every weekday. Lunch is served from 1 pm to 2 pm and dinner 6:30 pm to 8 pm. Glasgow City Mission staff and volunteers are available all day to advocate for those affected by homelessness and poverty.

Glasgow City Mission runs a number of events and clubs throughout the week ranging from art and IT classes to advice on housing and monetary issues.

== Child and Family Centre ==
Glasgow City Mission's Child and Family Centre has been working with children and families in Govan, Glasgow since 1986 and has become an integrated part of the community there. The Centre provides a Pre-School Nursery for an average of 40 children, a Parent and Toddler Group for over 25 toddlers and their parents, a toddler playgroup, and family support classes and advice for parents. The centre is run by dedicated play and nursery workers but relies on help from volunteers.
