= David Nasmith =

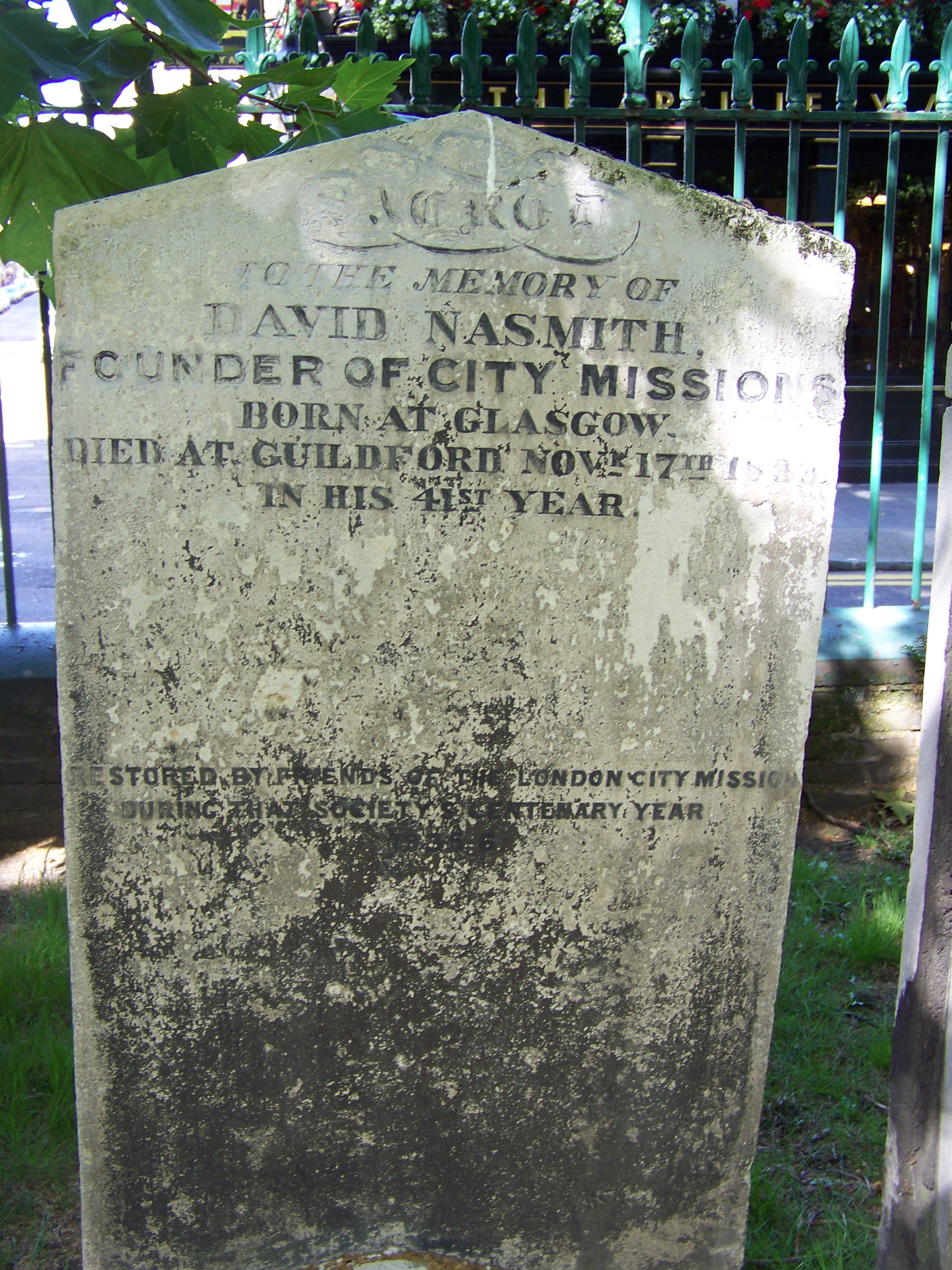
Nasmith's gravestone in Bunhill Fields, London

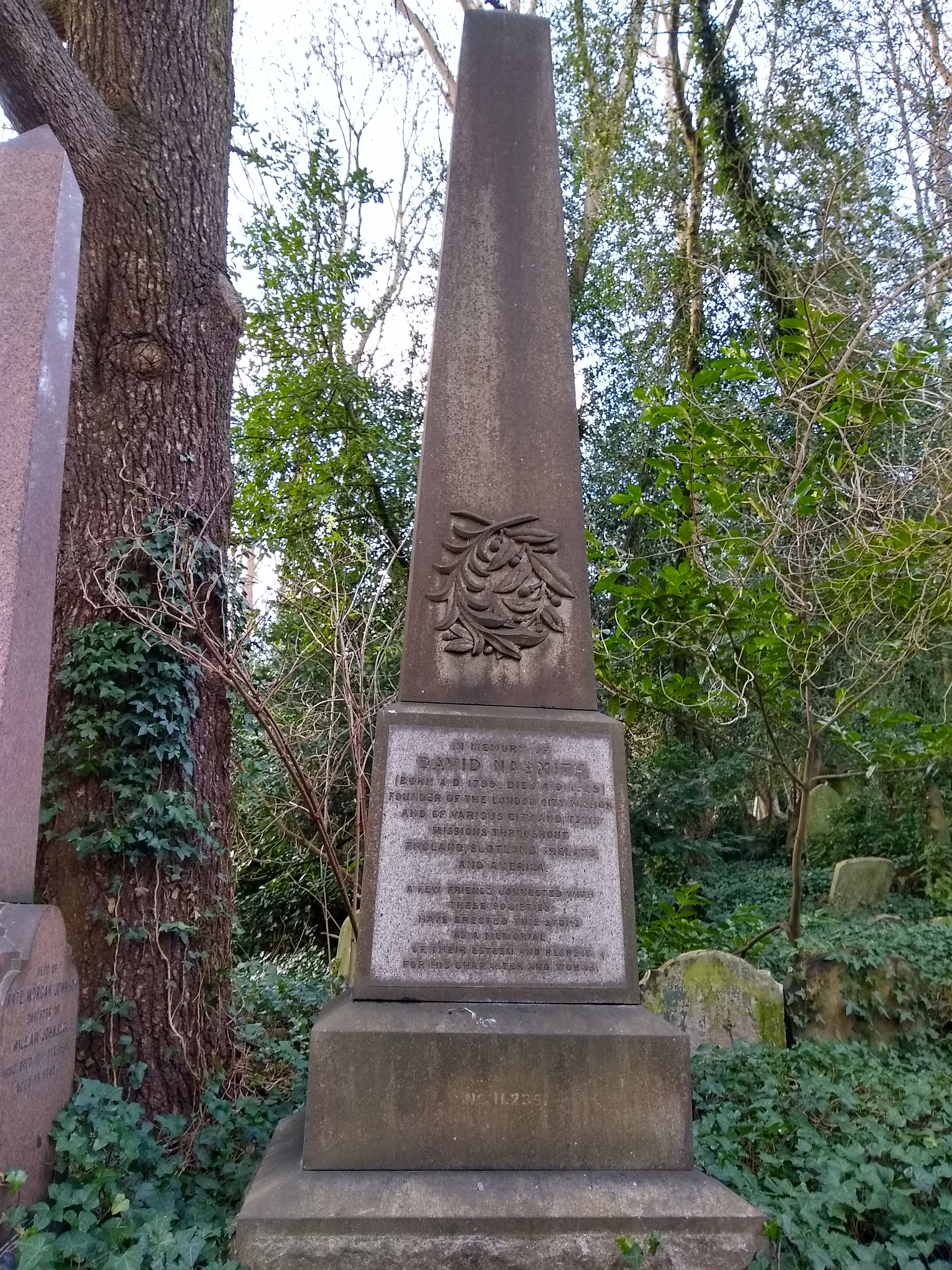
Grave of David Nasmith's wife in Highgate Cemetery (west)

David Nasmith (March 1799 – 17 November 1839) founded The City Mission Movement in the UK, the US and in Europe.

== Biography ==
Born in Glasgow, Scotland, Nasmith began life in manufacturing as an apprentice. He set up The Young Men's Society for Religious Improvement (1824), Glasgow City Mission (1826), Edinburgh City Mission (1832), and London City Mission (1835). He "died poor", in 1839, aged 40, in Guildford, Surrey, England. He was buried in Bunhill Fields. His wife was later buried in Highgate Cemetery and some friends from the City Missions erected a monument to David Nasmith over her grave. The inscription reads:

IN MEMORY OF DAVID NASMITH (BORN A.D.1799 DIED A.D.1839) FOUNDER OF THE LONDON CITY MISSION AND OF VARIOUS CITY AND TOWN MISSIONS THROUGHOUT ENGLAND, SCOTLAND, IRELAND AND AMERICA.

A FEW FRIENDS CONNECTED WITH THESE SOCIETIES HAVE ERECTED THIS STONE AS A MEMORIAL OF THEIR ESTEEM AND RESPECT FOR HIS CHARACTER AND WORKS.

== Influence ==
City and Gospel missions, also known as Gospel Rescue Missions in the US, are practical religion outside the walls of the church and an example of Evangelical parachurch organisations.

"David Nasmith originated the Young Men’s Christian Association in Glasgow, and set the institution at work in other cities and around the world. His life work was noted for being instrumental in welding the various denominations together for useful purposes. In 1821 he became secretary of the "Religious Societies of Glasgow" at the "Institution Rooms", 59 Glasswork Street. Nasmith possessed a marvelous power of organization and capacity for work. He was a true reformer, and thoroughly sincere in his endeavors to benefit others. He founded City Missions and Young Men’s Christian Associations". (A. G. Callant, author of Saint Mungo's Bells)

"Clubs and associations, missions and societies were in his blood. So many of them could claim him as founder that it is doubtful whether, at the age of thirty-six, he could have kept an accurate record of them all. As a founder of missions, it would be hard to find his equal." (Phyllis Thompson, author of To the Heart of the City)

== See also ==
- Nathaniel Pidgeon
