= London City Mission =

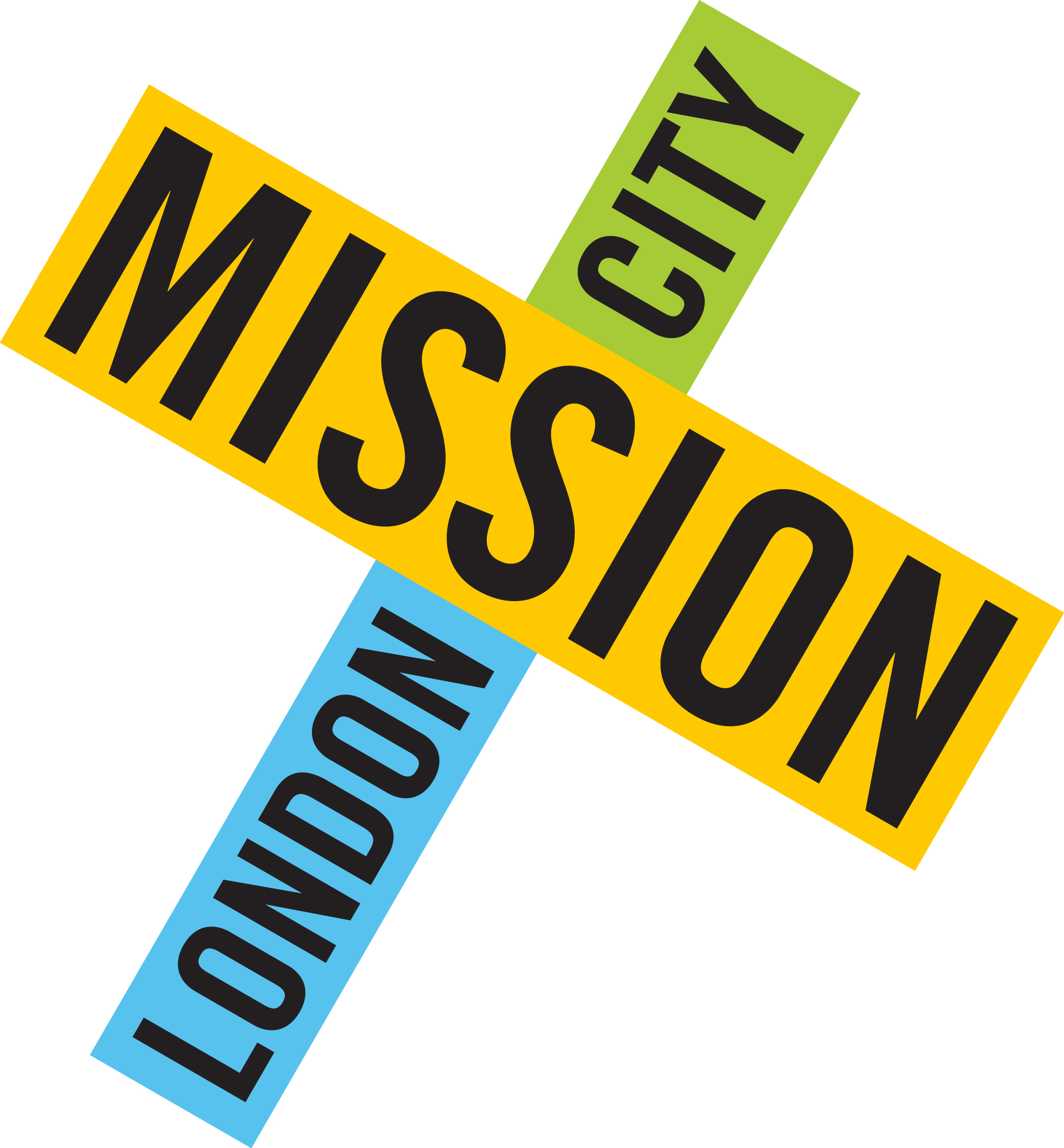
London City Mission Logo 2015

London City Mission was set up by David Nasmith on 16 May 1835 in the Hoxton area of east London. The first paid missionary was Lindsay Burfoot. Today it is part of the wider City Mission Movement.

== History ==
The London City Mission's early work centred on the poor and destitute, developing a wide range of charitable help including Ragged Schools and ministering to working people. One missionary wrote Last year I walked 3,000 miles on London pavements, paid 1,300 visits, 300 of which were to sick and dying cab men. Missionaries were also appointed to visit members of London's new fire service. The service's first Chief, James Braidwood, introduced the first such missionary in 1854. Within five years the missionary was visiting nineteen fire stations throughout London, ministering to 450 people (firemen, their wives and dependents).

The first Ragged School established by the London City Mission was in 1835 in a disused stable in the City of Westminster. It was established by the missionary Andrew Walker with a charitable donation fund-raised by Lord Shaftesbury amongst his colleagues in, and visitors to, the Houses of Parliament. Lord Shaftesbury became an ardent supporter of the Mission and YMCA's founder George Williams (YMCA) was an early president, until his death in 1905.

LCM was established as a joint venture by members of different Protestant denominations.

- Its aim was to "go to the people of London, especially the poor, to bring them to an acquaintance with Jesus Christ as Saviour, and to do them good by every means in their power."
- Its method was to recruit and pay full-time workers (all men at that time), assigning to each a "district" that he was to visit frequently, going from door to door.
- Its goal was to draw people into local churches.

LCM was a pioneering organisation, in:

- inter-denominational evangelism;
- employing full-time salaried lay-workers;
- socially caring activity in Victorian London.

LCM and its staff were innovative, being instrumental in the founding of other Christian and social organisations and in developing a range of ministry methods.

== Work of the Mission ==
The LCM exists to share with the people of London, patiently, sensitively and individually the transforming love of God in Jesus Christ, and to enable them to join his Church.

Core values

1. The Christian faith as defined in the Scriptures of the Old and New Testaments, as held by the historic Christian Church, and as summarised in the Mission's Statement of Faith (see below).
2. The duty of Christian evangelism, taking the good news of Jesus Christ to all, without regard to any distinctions of social status, gender, ethnicity, attitude or lifestyle.
3. The embodiment of the Christian message in compassionate and caring activity, as well as in relevant words, reflecting the ministry of Jesus Christ in word and deed, seeking true peace and justice for the city and its people.
4. The development of individuals and communities in a life of holiness, defined by the teachings of the Bible and reflecting the purity and attractive righteousness of God Himself.
5. The unique role of the Church in the plan of God, and the duty of the Mission to support and serve the Church in its task of evangelism and in its growth.
6. The maintenance of the highest standards of Christian integrity and pastoral care in all its activities, including its compliance with all relevant legislation, its treatment of its own staff, its stewardship of all its resources, and its involvement with the community.

A scholarly work on the London City Mission is Donald M. Lewis' Lighten Their Darkness: The Evangelical Mission to Working-Class London, 1828-1860 (Greenwood Press, 1985; reprinted by Paternoster, 2001). Lewis examines the role that the LCM played in broadening interdenominational cooperation among evangelicals in the nineteenth century, against the earlier view that this sort of cooperation only emerged much later in the century.

As the object of the Mission is to extend the knowledge of the Gospel, it is a fundamental law that the following doctrines be prominently taught by the Agents and publications of the Mission. They are given "not in the words which man's wisdom teaches, but which the Holy Spirit teaches".

"All have sinned and come short of the glory of God."
"In the beginning was the Word, and the Word was with God, and the Word was God. And the Word was made flesh and dwelt among us."
"Except a man be born again, he cannot see the kingdom of God."
"The blood of Jesus Christ, God's Son, cleanses us from all sin."
"Being justified by faith we have peace with God through our Lord Jesus Christ."
"Neither is there salvation in any other; for there is no other name under heaven given among men, whereby we must be saved."
"Without holiness no man shall see the Lord."
"You are sanctified ... by the Spirit of God."

— Extract from the LCM Constitution of 1835
