= Islam in the United Kingdom =

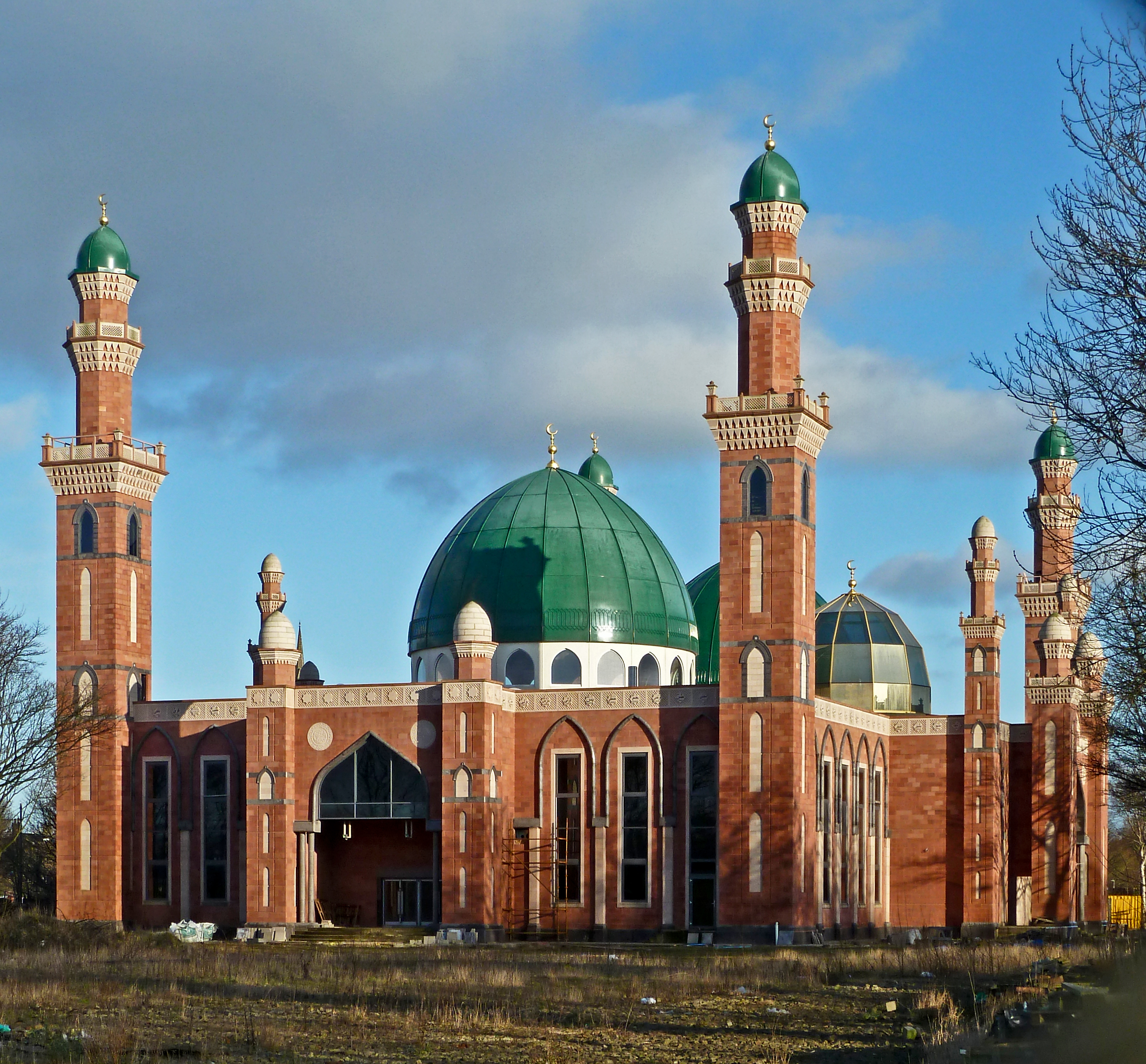
- The Bradford Grand Mosque is the largest mosque by capacity in the United Kingdom, and the largest in Yorkshire and the Humber.

Total population
- United Kingdom: 3,998,875 – 6.0% (2021–2022); England: 3,801,186 – 6.7% (2021); Scotland: 119,872 – 2.2% (2022); Wales: 66,947 – 2.2% (2021); Northern Ireland: 10,870 – 0.6% (2021)

Regions with significant populations
- Greater London: 1,318,754 – 15.0%
- West Midlands: 569,963 – 9.6%
- North West England: 563,105 – 7.6%
- Yorkshire and the Humber: 442,533 – 8.1%

Religions
- Sunni Islam Shia Islam

Languages
- English: Urdu; Arabic; Punjabi (Note: Including Pahari-Pothwari); Sindhi; Bengali; Gujarati; Turkish; Somali; Persian

Islam in Europe by percentage of country population 95–100%: Azerbaijan; 90–95%: Turkey; Kosovo; 50–70%: Albania; Bosnia and Herzegovina; Kazakhstan; 30–35%: North Macedonia; 10–20%: France; Sweden; Georgia; Montenegro; 5–10%: Austria; Belgium; Bulgaria; Denmark; Germany; Liechtenstein; Luxembourg; Netherlands; Russia; Switzerland; United Kingdom; Spain; Greece; 4–5%: Serbia; 2–4%: Italy; Finland; Norway; Malta; Slovenia; Cyprus (Note: Only takes into account the Muslim population residing on land controlled by the Republic of Cyprus.); 1–2%: Croatia; Ireland; Ukraine; Andorra; < 1%: Iceland; Armenia; Belarus; Czech Republic; Estonia; Hungary; Latvia; Lithuania; Moldova; Monaco; Poland; Portugal; Romania; San Marino; Slovakia

Islam is the second-largest religion in the United Kingdom, with results from the 2021-2022 Censuses recording just under four million Muslims, or 6.0% of the total population in the United Kingdom. London has the largest population and greatest proportion (15%) of Muslims in the country. The vast majority of British Muslims in the United Kingdom adhere to Sunni Islam, while smaller numbers are associated with Shia Islam.

During the Middle Ages, there was limited cultural exchange between Christendom and the Islamic world. There was no established Muslim presence in the British Isles, though a small number of Crusaders are recorded as having converted in the East, including Robert of St Albans. During the Elizabethan era, contacts became more explicit as the Tudors pursued diplomatic and commercial relations with Muslim powers, including the Ottoman Empire, in part to counter Catholic Habsburg Spain.

As the British Empire expanded, Britain came to rule territories with large Muslim populations; some Muslim seamen (lascars) are known to have settled in Britain from the mid-18th century onwards. In the 19th century, Victorian Orientalism contributed to growing interest in Islam and a number of Britons, including members of the aristocracy, converted. Marmaduke Pickthall, an English writer and convert to Islam, produced the first complete English-language translation of the Qur'an by a British Muslim in 1930. Under the British Indian Army, large numbers of Muslims fought for the United Kingdom during the First and Second World Wars, with some receiving the Victoria Cross. In the decades after the Second World War—particularly following the partition of India in 1947-many Muslims from what is now India, Pakistan and Bangladesh settled permanently in Britain.

Today, British Muslims are ethnically diverse. South Asians form the largest share of Muslims in Britain, alongside significant Turkish, Arab, and Somali communities, as well as an estimated 100,000 British converts from a range of backgrounds. Muslims have the youngest average age profile among the major religious groups in the United Kingdom. The Muslim population has grown significantly in recent decades, at a rate several times faster than the population overall. Recent broad estimates suggest around 5,000–6,000 people convert to Islam each year, with women forming the majority in survey-based studies.

== History ==
=== Early history ===
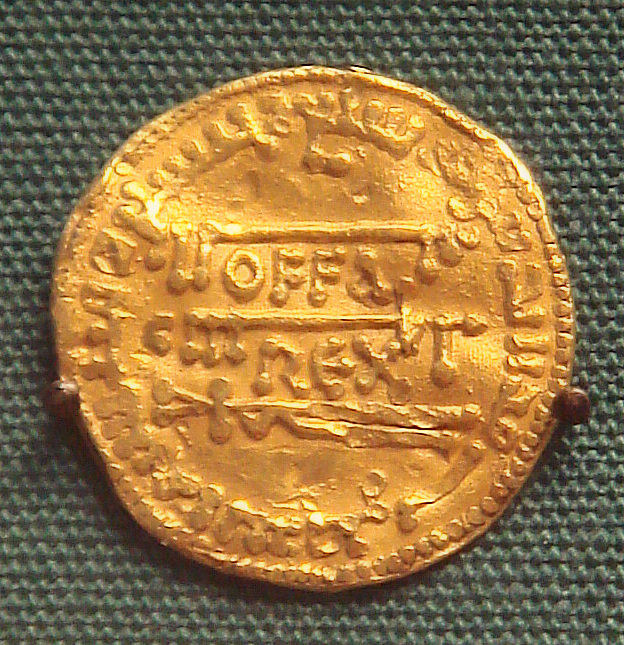
A mancus/gold dinar of king Offa, copied from the dinars of the Abbasid Caliphate (774). It includes the Arabic text "Muhammad is the Apostle of Allah", a line from the Shahada.

The earliest evidence of Islamic influence in England dates to the 8th century when Offa, the Anglo-Saxon king of Mercia, minted a coin with an Arabic inscription, largely a copy of coins issued by a contemporary Abbasid ruler Caliph Al-Mansur. In the 16th century, Muslims from North Africa, the Middle East and Central Asia were present in London, working in a range of roles, from diplomats and translators to merchants and musicians.

In 1627, the Salé Rovers, from the Republic of Salé (in modern-day Morocco) occupied the English island of Lundy for five years. The Barbary pirates, under the command of the Dutch Muslim Jan Janszoon, flew an Ottoman flag over the island. Slaving raids were made embarking from Lundy by the Barbary pirates, and captured Europeans were held on Lundy before being sent to Algiers to be sold as slaves.

=== Interactions under British Empire ===
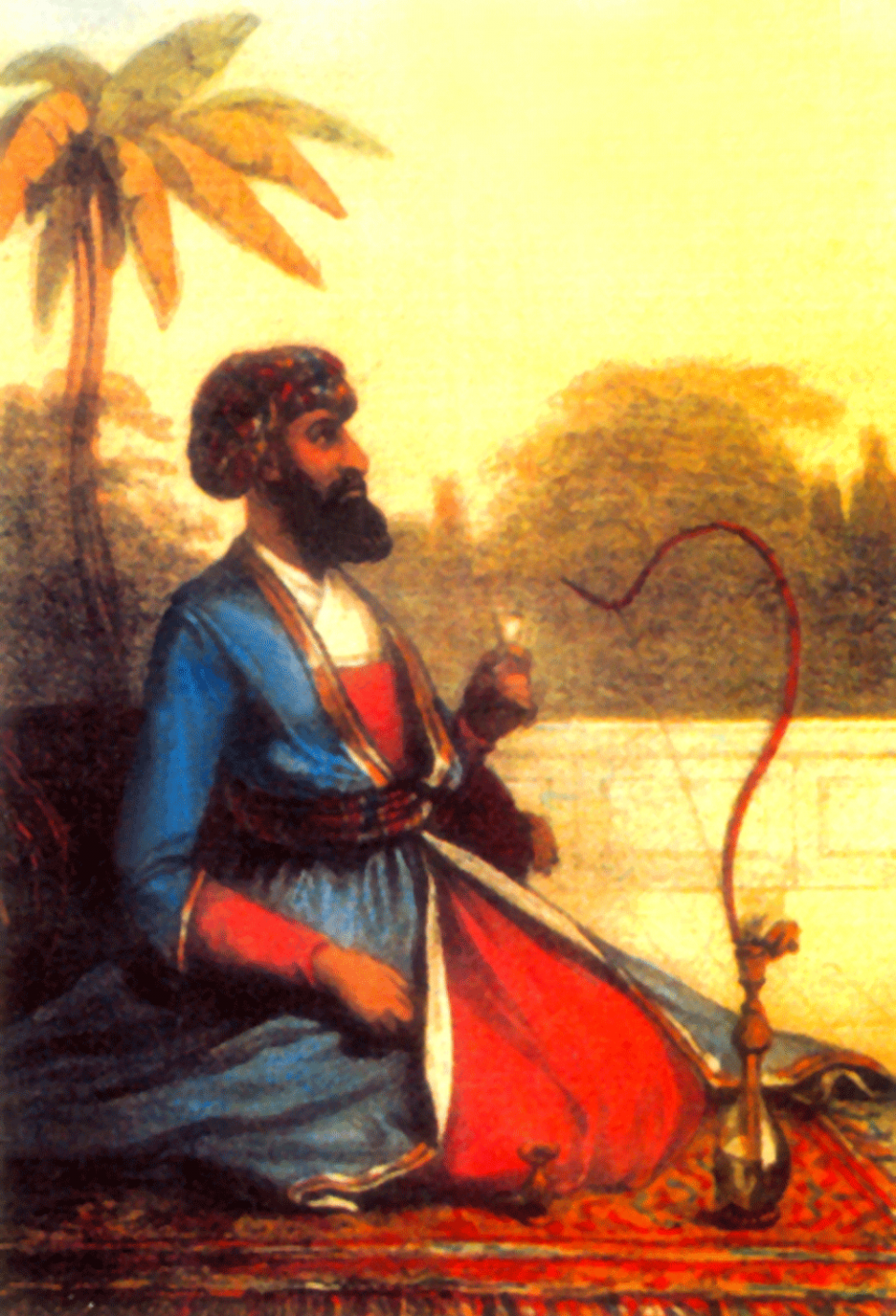
Bengali Muslim diplomat I'tisam-ud-Din was the first educated South Asian to have travelled to the United Kingdom in 1765.

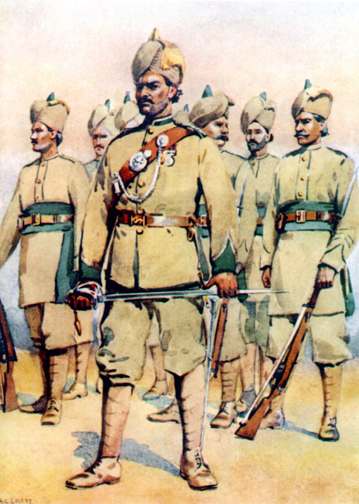
Punjabi Muslims of the 33rd Punjabis, British Indian Army

Bengal was annexed by the East India Company from the quasi-independent Nawabs of Bengal following the Battle of Plassey in 1757. The manufactured goods produced in Bengal directly contributed to the Industrial Revolution in Britain, with the textiles produced in Bengal being used to support British industries such as textile manufacturing, aided by the invention of devices such as the spinning jenny. With the establishment of Crown control in India after 1857, the British Empire came to rule over a large Muslim population. The first educated South Asian to travel to Europe and live in Britain was I'tisam-ud-Din, a Bengali Muslim cleric, munshi and diplomat to the Mughal Empire who arrived in 1765 with his servant Muhammad Muqim during the reign of King George III. He wrote of his experiences and travels in his Persian book, Shigurf-nama-i-Wilayat (or 'Wonder Book of Europe').

In South Asia, specifically, the British ruled over one of the largest Muslim populations in the world. Upon coming into contact with such a population, the British authorities forged a uniquely Muslim identity for the local believers. This was, in part, due to the way British historians periodised South Asian history into an "ancient" Hindu one and a "medieval" Muslim one. Under the system, the colonial period was classified as "modern". Debate rages on concerning the utility and legitimacy of these labels themselves. Problems with these labels range from the connotations coupled with the word 'medieval' to the implications related to labelling the colonial era as "modern". The term medieval itself is quite controversial. Historians writing in journals relating to the time period have asked whether the term is a "tyrannous construct" or an "alien conceptual hegemony". This is because the label was originally developed during the study of European history to mark the period in between the fall of the Roman Empire and the fall of Constantinople.

Such classifications done by British historians throughout their long period of rule paved the way for a more cohesive Muslim identity. In the eighteenth century, this seemed unlikely. Muslims who hailed from Afghan, Turk, Persian, or Arab roots did not find their Muslim identities especially salient. Mughal courts divided not into Hindu or Muslim factions but Persian and Turkish ones. Converts to the religion outside of courtly life, the majority of the Muslim population in the Subcontinent, too were more focused on their regional and lingual cultural identities-whether that be Bengali, Punjabi, Sindhi, or Gujarati.

The first group of Muslims to come to Great Britain in significant numbers, in the 18th century, were lascars (sailors) recruited from the Indian subcontinent, largely from the Bengal region, to work for the East India Company on British ships, some of whom settled down and took local wives. Due to the majority being lascars, the earliest Muslim communities were found in port towns. Naval cooks also came, many of them from the Sylhet district of British Bengal (now in Bangladesh). One of the most famous early Asian immigrants to England was the Bengali Muslim entrepreneur Sake Dean Mahomet, a captain of the East India Company who in 1810 founded London's first Indian restaurant, the Hindoostanee Coffee House.

Between 1803 and 1813, there were more than 10,000 lascars from the Indian subcontinent visiting British port cities and towns. By 1842, 3,000 lascars visited the UK annually, and by 1855, 12,000 lascars were arriving annually in British ports. In 1873, 3,271 lascars arrived in Britain. Throughout the early 19th century lascars visited Britain at a rate of 1,000 every year, which increased to a rate of 10,000 to 12,000 every year throughout the late 19th century. A prominent English convert of the 19th century was Henry Stanley, 3rd Baron Stanley of Alderley, who became a Muslim in 1862. Although not a convert himself, the Victorian Age adventurer, Sir Richard Francis Burton visited Mecca in disguise, documented in The Book of the Thousand Nights and a Night. At the beginning of World War I, there were 51,616 South Asian lascars working on British ships, the majority of whom were of Bengali descent. In 1932, the Indian National Congress survey of 'all Indians outside India' (which included modern Pakistani and Bangladeshi territories) estimated that there were 7,128 Indians living in the United Kingdom.

By 1911, the British Empire had a Muslim population of 94 million, larger than the empire's 58 million Christian population. By the 1920s, the British Empire included roughly half of the world's Muslim population. More than 400,000 Muslim soldiers of the British Indian Army fought for Britain during World War I, where 62,060 were killed in action. Muslim soldiers of the British Indian Army later fought for Britain against the Nazis in World War II, where Muslim soldiers accounted for up to 40% of the 2.5 million troops serving the British Indian Army. David Lloyd George, British Prime Minister from 1916 to 1922, stated: "we are the greatest Mahomedan power in the world and one-fourth of the population of the British Empire is Mahomedan. There have been no more loyal adherents to the throne and no more effective and loyal supporters of the Empire in its hour of trial." This statement was later reiterated by Gandhi in 1920. Winston Churchill also stated in 1942: "We must not on any account break with the Moslems, who represent a hundred million people, and the main army elements on which we must rely for the immediate fighting."

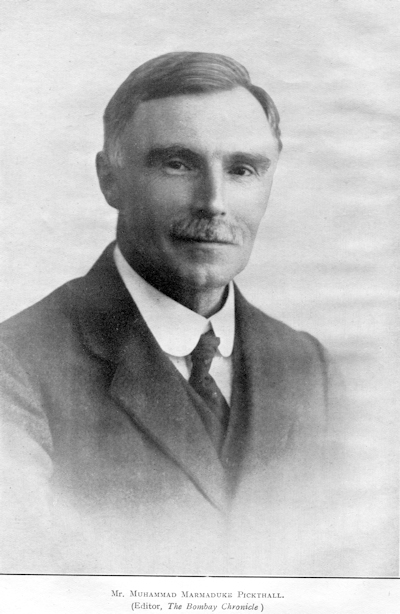
Marmaduke Pickthall authored an English language translation of the Qur'an in 1930.

The Shah Jahan Mosque in Woking was the first purpose-built mosque in Britain, and was built in 1889. In the same year, Abdullah Quilliam installed a mosque in a terrace in Liverpool, which became the Liverpool Muslim Institute. The first mosque in London was the Fazl Mosque, established in 1924, commonly called the London mosque.

Quran translators Yusuf Ali and Marmaduke Pickthall, who authored The Meaning of the Glorious Koran: An Explanatory Translation in 1930, were both trustees of the Shah Jahan Mosque in Woking and the East London Mosque.

Other aristocratic British converts included Sir Archibald Hamilton, 5th Baronet, Rowland Allanson-Winn, 5th Baron Headley, St John Philby and Zainab Cobbold (the first Muslim woman born in Britain to perform the pilgrimage to Mecca).

=== Immigration and post-World War II ===
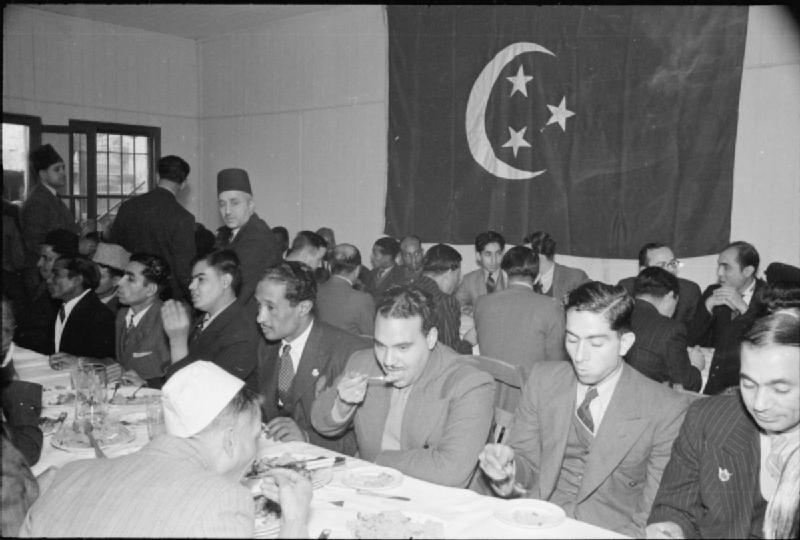
Muslims during an Eid al-Fitr feast at the East London Mosque in 1941

Large-scale immigration of Muslims to Britain began after World War II, as a result of the destruction and labour shortages caused by the war. Muslim migrants from former British colonies, predominantly India, Pakistan, and Bangladesh (East Pakistan until 1971), were recruited in large numbers by government and businesses to rebuild the country. Large numbers of doctors recruited from India and Pakistan also played a role in the establishment of the National Health Service (NHS).

British Asians (both Muslim and non-Muslim) faced increased discrimination following Powell's "Rivers of Blood" speech and the establishment of the National Front (NF) in the late 1960s. This included overt racism in the form of "Paki bashing", predominantly from white power skinheads, the National Front, and the British National Party (BNP), throughout the 1970s and 1980s. Drawing inspiration from the civil rights movement, the black power movement, and the anti-apartheid movement, young British Pakistani and British Bangladeshi activists began a number of anti-racist Asian youth movements in the 1970s and 1980s, including the Bradford Youth Movement in 1977, the Bangladeshi Youth Movement following the murder of Altab Ali in 1978, and the Newham Youth Movement following the murder of Akhtar Ali Baig in 1980.

The majority of mosques founded after World War II in Britain are reflective of the major strands of Sunni Islam predominating in the Indian subcontinent; namely Deobandi and Barelvi (the latter of which is more Sufi-orientated). There are also a smaller number of Salafi-oriented mosques, inspired by Abul A'la Maududi and Jamaat-e-Islami, are representative of the Arab mainstream or are associated with the UK Turkish Islamic Trust. In addition to this there are Twelver Shīʿa Mosques. The Murabitun World Movement founded by Abdalqadir as-Sufi (born Ian Dallas) in 1968 is a branch of the Sufi Darqawi-Shadhili-Qadiri tariqa which was run out of Achnagairn in the Scottish Highlands.

Martin Lings, an English Muslim scholar, published a biography of Muhammad in 1983 entitled Muhammad: His Life Based on the Earliest Sources. The publication of Salman Rushdie's novel The Satanic Verses in 1988 caused major controversy. A number of Muslims in Britain condemned the book for blasphemy. On 2 December 1988, the book was publicly burned at a demonstration in Bolton attended by 7,000 Muslims, followed by a similar demonstration and book-burning in Bradford on 14 January 1989.

Recently, several wars in the Balkans, Middle East and North Africa have led to many Muslims migrating to the United Kingdom. In 1992, with the outbreak of the Bosnian War, a large number of Bosniaks who fled the ethnic cleansing and genocide ended up settling in Britain. Their numbers currently exist at between 10,000 and 15,000 including their descendants. Just over three years later, an insurgency in Kosovo beginning in 1995, eventually evolving into the Kosovo War in 1998, would see 29,000 Kosovo Albanians flee their homes and settle in Britain. It is commonly believed that many Albanians from Albania moved to the United Kingdom at this time, posing as refugees from Kosovo, in search of a better life in the UK.

A mere decade later, the Arab Spring (and later Arab Winter) brought a wave of Muslim refugees fleeing civil war in Syria, war in Iraq, two wars in Libya, war in Yemen and countless other insurgencies by political groups and other terrorist organisations which exerted control over vast swathes of territory in the Middle East. Britain took on 20,000 refugees from Syria and 11,647 from Iraq.

The growing number of Muslims resulted in the establishment of more than 1,500 mosques by 2007.

== Demographics ==
Muslim population in the United Kingdom
Year	Pop.	±%
2001	1,591,126	—
2011	2,786,635	+75.1%
2021	3,998,875	+43.5%
Religious Affiliation was not recorded in the census prior to 2001.

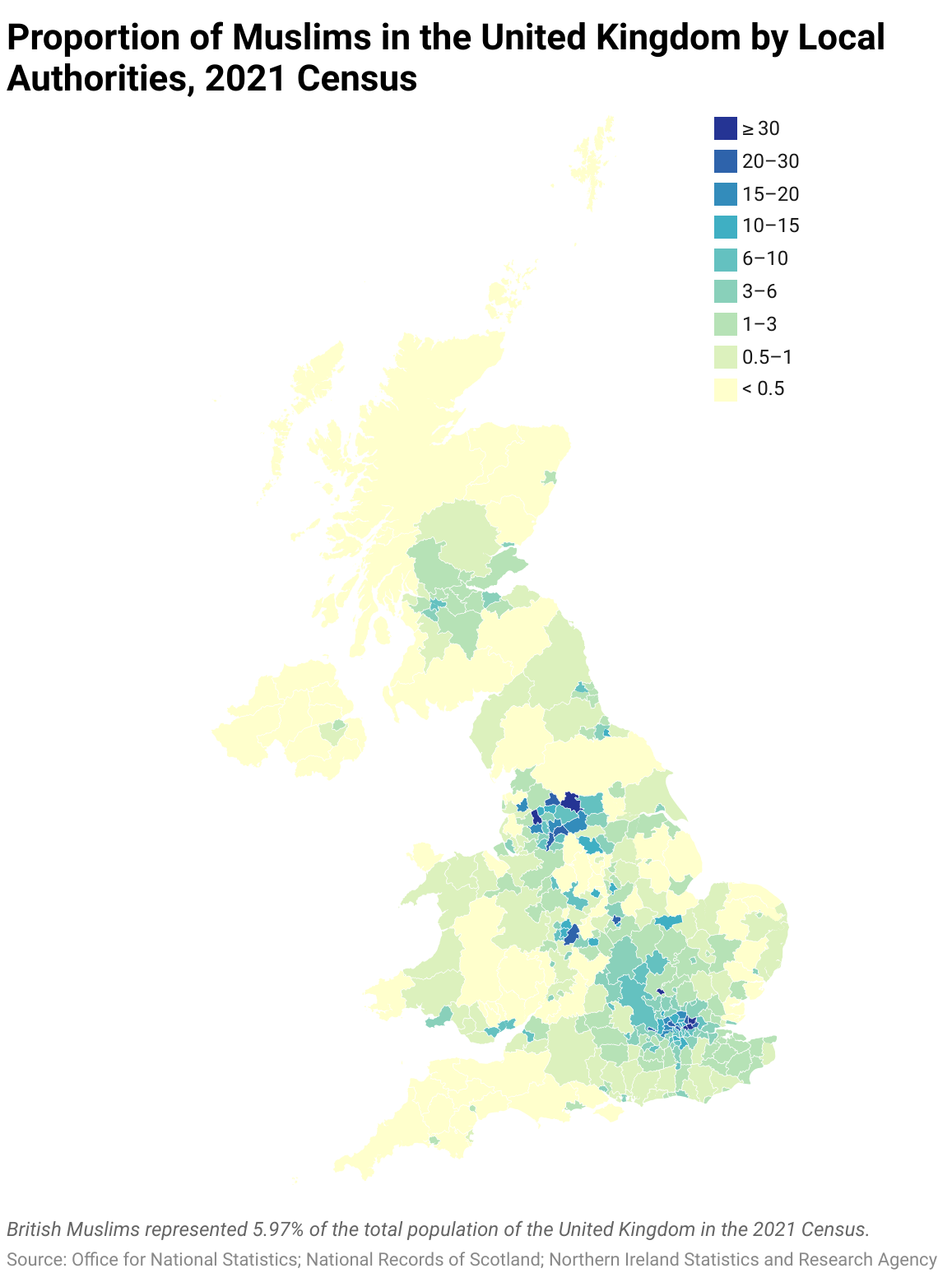
Distribution of British Muslims by local authority, 2021 census

Muslims in the United Kingdom by region and country
Region / Country	2021 (Note: 2021/22: England and Wales, Northern Ireland, and Scotland)		2011 (Note: 2011: England and Wales, Northern Ireland, and Scotland)		2001 (Note: 2001: England and Wales, Northern Ireland and Scotland)	
Region / Country	Number	%	Number	%	Number	%
England	3,801,186	6.7%	2,660,116	5.0%	1,524,887	3.1%
—Greater London	1,318,754	15.0%	1,012,823	12.4%	607,083	8.5%
—West Midlands	569,963	9.6%	376,152	6.7%	216,184	4.1%
—North West	563,105	7.6%	356,458	5.1%	204,261	3.0%
—Yorkshire and the Humber	442,533	8.1%	326,050	6.2%	189,089	3.8%
—South East	309,067	3.3%	201,651	2.3%	108,725	1.4%
—East	234,744	3.3%	148,341	2.5%	78,931	1.5%
—East Midlands	210,766	4.3%	140,649	3.1%	70,224	1.7%
—South West	80,152	1.4%	51,228	1.0%	23,465	0.5%
—North East	72,102	2.7%	46,764	1.8%	26,925	1.1%
Scotland	119,872 (Note: Scotland held its census a year later after the rest of the United Kingdom due to the COVID-19 pandemic. As a result, data shown is for 2022 as opposed to 2021.)	2.2%	76,737	1.4%	42,557	0.8%
Wales	66,947	2.2%	45,950	1.5%	21,739	0.7%
Northern Ireland	10,870	0.6%	3,832	0.2%	1,943	0.1%
United Kingdom	3,998,875	6.0%	2,786,635	4.4%	1,591,126	2.7%

Muslim population of England and Wales
Year	Pop.	±%
1961	50,000	—
1971	226,000	+352.0%
1981	553,000	+144.7%
1991	950,000	+71.8%
2001	1,600,000	+68.4%
2011	2,706,066	+69.1%
2021	3,868,133	+42.9%

Muslim population pyramid in 2021 in England and Wales

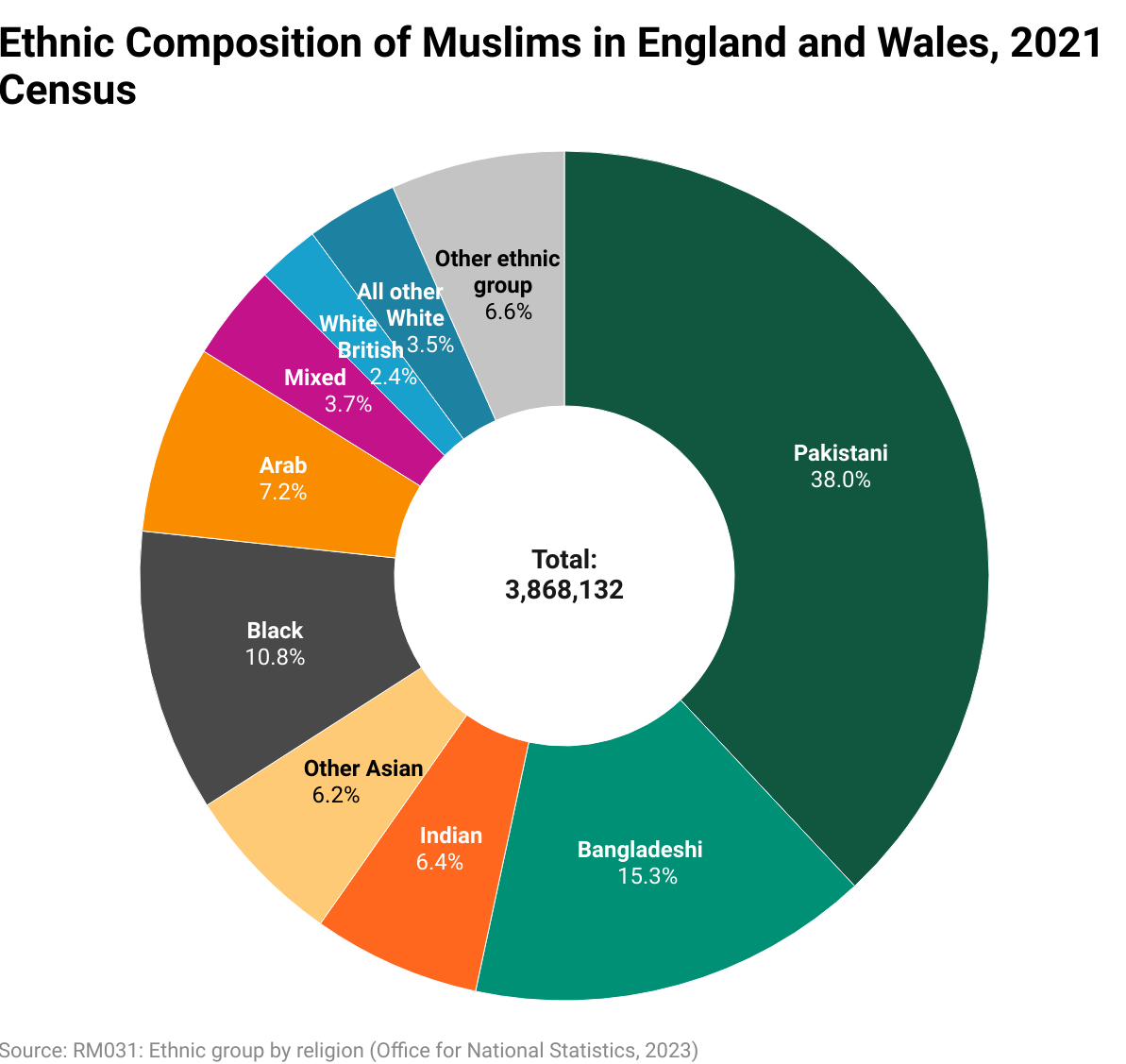
Ethnic composition of British Muslims, 2021 census

Year of arrival (2021 census, England and Wales)
1. Born in the UK (51.0%)
2. Before 1971 (2.20%)
3. 1971 to 1980 (3.20%)
4. 1981 to 1990 (4.00%)
5. 1991 to 2000 (7.40%)
6. 2001 to 2010 (13.3%)
7. 2011 to 2021 (18.9%)

According to the 2021 United Kingdom census, Muslims in England and Wales numbered 3,868,133, or 6.5% of the population. Northern Ireland recorded a population of 10,870, or 0.6% of the population, with the highest number of Muslims recorded in Belfast at 5,487, or 1.59% of the population. The equivalent census was conducted a year later in Scotland and recorded a population of 119,872, or 2.2% of the population. In Scotland, Glasgow recorded the highest number of Muslims at 48,766, or 7.86% of the population. The top 25 local authorities in the United Kingdom with the highest percentage of Muslims based on the 2021 census were:

Top 25 local authorities (2021 Census)
Local authority	Population	Per cent
London Borough of Tower Hamlets	123,912	39.93%
Blackburn with Darwen	54,146	34.99%
London Borough of Newham	122,146	34.80%
Luton	74,191	32.94%
London Borough of Redbridge	97,068	31.29%
City of Bradford	166,846	30.53%
Birmingham	341,811	29.85%
Slough	46,661	29.44%
Pendle	24,900	26.00%
Metropolitan Borough of Oldham	59,031	24.38%
Leicester	86,443	23.45%
Manchester	122,962	22.28%
London Borough of Waltham Forest	60,157	21.61%
London Borough of Brent	72,574	21.36%
City of Westminster	40,873	20.01%
Bolton	58,997	19.93%
Rochdale	42,121	18.82%
London Borough of Ealing	68,907	18.77%
London Borough of Enfield	61,477	18.63%
Kirklees	80,046	18.48%
London Borough of Hounslow	48,028	16.67%
Preston	23,825	16.12%
London Borough of Camden	33,830	16.10%
London Borough of Harrow	41,503	15.89%
Hyndburn	12,049	14.65%

In the 2021 census for England and Wales, the main places of birth were the United Kingdom at 1,974,479 people (51.0% of the total Muslim population), South Asia at 993,415 (25.7%), Africa at 366,133 (9.5%), other parts of Europe at 262,685 (6.8%) and the Middle East at 231,261 (6.0%). Among individual countries outside of the UK, the countries of Pakistan; Bangladesh; Somalia; India; Iraq; Turkey; Afghanistan; Iran; Syria; and Italy made up the top ten most common countries of birth for Muslims residing in England and Wales. 59.7% of Muslims identified as either Pakistani/Bangladeshi/Indian, 6.2% were of other Asian heritage, 10.8% identified as Black, 7.2% identified as Arab, 5.9% were White, 3.7% were of Mixed heritage, and the remaining 6.6% identified with other ethnic groups.

The Muslim population of England and Wales has grown consistently since World War II. Sophie Gilliat-Ray attributes the recent growth to "recent immigration, the higher than average birth rate, some conversion to Islam". In 2017, Pew Research Center projected the population of Muslims in the United Kingdom to grow to 6.56 million (12.7% of the population) by 2050 under a zero migration scenario, or to 13.48 million (17.2%) under a high migration scenario.

Several large cities have one area that is a majority Muslim even if the rest of the city has a fairly small Muslim population. In addition, it is possible to find small areas that are almost entirely Muslim: for example, Savile Town in Dewsbury.

Initial limited mosque availability meant that prayers were conducted in small rooms of council flats until the 1980s when more and larger facilities became available. Some synagogues and community buildings were turned into mosques and existing mosques began to expand their buildings. This process has continued down to the present day with the East London Mosque recently expanding into a large former car park where the London Muslim Centre is now used for prayers, recreational facilities and housing. Most people regard themselves as part of the ummah, and their identity is based on their religion rather than their ethnic group.

The 2001 census recorded that there were 179,733 Muslims who described themselves as 'white'. 65% of white Muslims described themselves as "other white", and would likely have originated from locations such as Bosnia and Herzegovina, Kosovo, Adygea, Chechnya, Albania, Turkey, Bulgaria, the region of East Macedonia and Thrace in Northern Greece, and North Macedonia. The remainder of white Muslims are converts and mostly identified themselves as White British and White Irish.

Islam is the third-largest religious group of British Indian people, after Hinduism and Sikhism. 8% of UK Muslims are of Indian descent, principally those whose origins are in Gujarat, West Bengal, Telangana and Kerala. Gujarati Muslims from the Surat and Bharuch districts started to arrive from the 1940s when India was under British colonial rule, settling in the towns of Dewsbury and Batley in Yorkshire and in parts of Lancashire.

Census Year	Number of Muslims	Population of England and Wales	Muslim (% of population)	Registered mosques	Muslims per mosque
1961	50,000	46,196,000	0.11	7	7,143
1971	226,000	49,152,000	0.46	30	7,533
1981	553,000	49,634,000	1.11	149	3,711
1991	950,000	51,099,000	1.86	443	2,144
2001	1,600,000	52,042,000	3.07	614	2,606
2011	2,706,000	56,076,000	4.83	1,500	1,912
2021	3,868,133	59,597,542	6.5	–	–

=== South Asian ===
==== Pakistanis ====
The single largest group of Muslims in the United Kingdom are of Pakistani descent. Pakistanis were one of the first South Asian Muslim communities to permanently settle in the United Kingdom, arriving in England first in the late 1940s. Immigration from Mirpur in Pakistan grew from the late 1950s, accompanied by immigration from other parts of Pakistan especially from Punjab, particularly from the surrounding Punjab villages of Faisalabad, Sahiwal, Sialkot, Jhelum, Gujar Khan and Gujrat, in addition to from the north-west Punjab including the chhachhi Pathans and Pashtuns from Attock District, and some from villages of Ghazi, Nowshera and Peshawar. There is also a fairly large Punjabi community from East Africa found in London. People of Pakistani extraction are particularly notable in West Midlands, West Yorkshire, London, Lancashire/Greater Manchester and several industrial towns such as Luton, Slough and High Wycombe in the Home Counties. There are smaller numbers of Sindhis in Greater London. Pakistanis were traditionally working class but are slowly progressing into a Metropolitan middle class.

Chain migration played a significant role, as many of the early migrants helped bring their family members to the UK. Today, the British Mirpuri diaspora is one of the largest Kashmiri communities outside of South Asia, with strong ties to cities like Bradford, Birmingham, and Manchester.

==== Bangladeshis ====
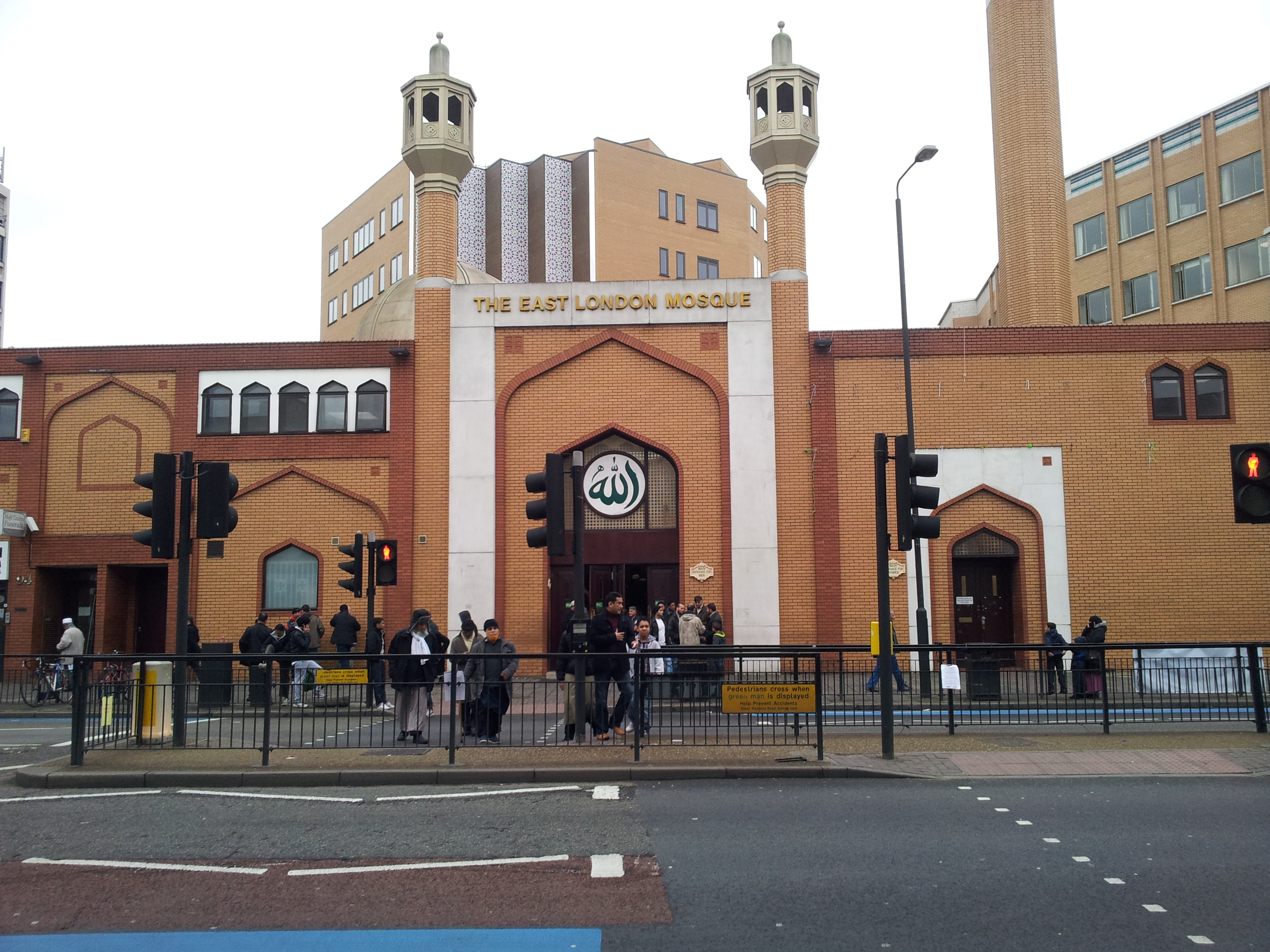
The East London Mosque was one of the first in Britain to be allowed to use loudspeakers to broadcast the adhan.

People of Bangladeshi descent are the second largest Muslim community (after Pakistanis), 15% of Muslims in England and Wales are of Bangladeshi descent, one of the ethnic groups in the UK with the largest proportion of people following a single religion, being 92% Muslim. The majority of these Muslims come from the Sylhet Division of Bangladesh. Many mosques opened by the British Bangladeshi community are often named after Shah Jalal and other Sufi saints who took part in the Islamic conquest of Sylhet in 1303. British Bangladeshi Muslims are mainly concentrated in London (Tower Hamlets and Newham), Luton, Birmingham and Oldham. The Bangladeshi Muslim community in London forms 24% of the Muslim population, larger than any other ethnic group. Other smaller Bangladeshi Muslim communities are present in Newcastle upon Tyne, Bradford, Manchester, Sunderland, Portsmouth, and Rochdale.

There are groups which are active throughout Bangladeshi communities such as The Young Muslim Organisation. It is connected to the Islamic Forum Europe, associated with the East London Mosque and the London Muslim Centre – all of which have connections with the Bangladeshi political party, the Jamaat-e-Islami. Other large groups include another Sunni movement, the Fultoli (founded in Sylhet), and the Tablighi Jamaat – which is a missionary and revival movement, and avoids political attention. The Hizb ut-Tahrir calls for the Khilafah (caliphate) and influences by publishing annual magazines, and lectures through mainly political concepts, and the other which is a movement within Sunni Islam is the Salafi – who view the teachings of the first generations after Muhammed as the correct teachings, and appeals to younger Muslims as a way to differentiate themselves towards their elders. All these groups work to stimulate Islamic identity among local Bengalis or Muslims and particularly focus on the younger members of the communities. The British Bangladeshi community has held a strong point in Islam, often opening large mosques such as East London Mosque and Brick Lane Masjid, as well as opening madrassas and Islamic TV channels.

==== Indians ====
There are large numbers of Gujarati Muslims in Dewsbury, Blackburn (including Darwen), Bolton, Preston, Nottingham, Leicester, Nuneaton, Gloucester and London (Newham, Waltham Forest and Hackney).

=== Middle Eastern ===
==== Arabs ====
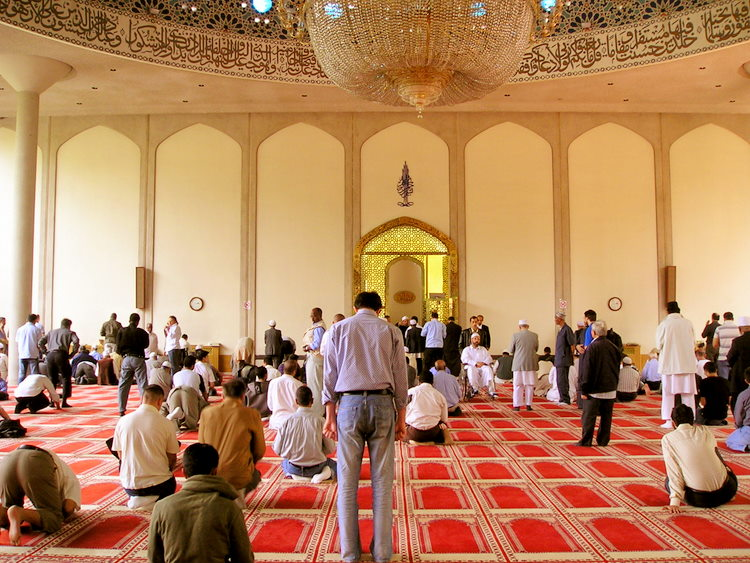
London Central Mosque interior

People of Arab origin in Britain are the descendants of Arab immigrants to Britain from a variety of Arab states or entities, including Yemen, Syria, Iraq, Lebanon, Jordan, Egypt and the Palestinian Authority. Most British Arabs are Sunni Muslim, although some – such as those of Iraqi and Lebanese origin – are Shi'ite. The main Arab Muslim communities in the UK live in the Greater London area, with smaller numbers living in Manchester, Liverpool, and Birmingham. There are also sizable and very long-established communities of Muslim Yemenis in the United Kingdom in among other places Cardiff and the South Shields area near Newcastle.

==== Kurds ====
The UK has a significant Iraqi Kurdish population. Iraqi Kurds are mostly Sunni Muslims.

According to the Department for Communities and Local Government, the Iraqi Kurds make up the largest group of Kurds in the country, exceeding the numbers from Turkey and Iran.

The 2001 UK Census recorded 32,236 Iraqi-born residents, and the Office for National Statistics estimates that, as of 2009, this figure had risen to around 65,000. According to estimates by the Iraqi embassy, the Iraqi population in the UK is around 350,000–450,000.

==== Turks ====
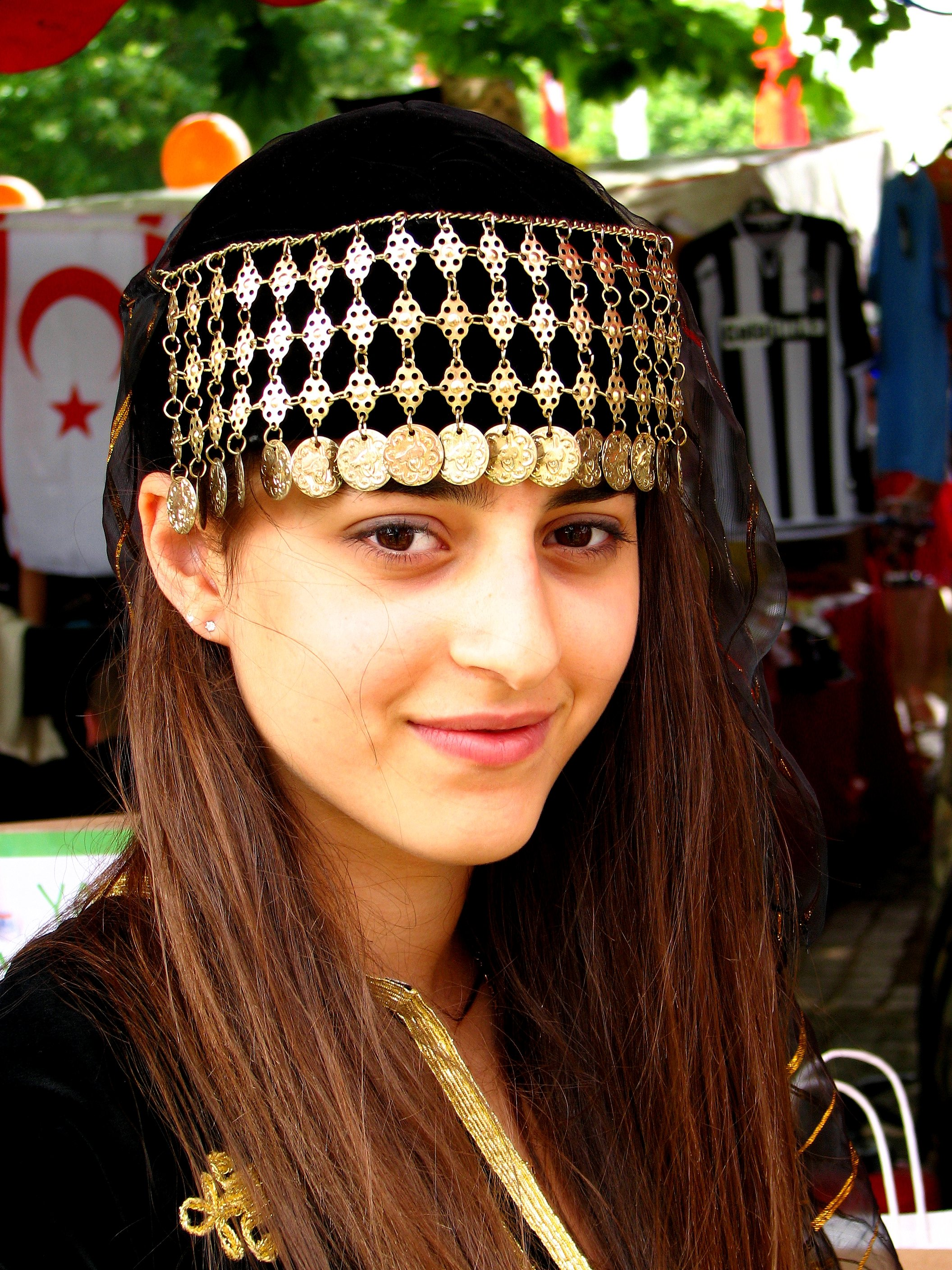
A Turkish girl in London

Turks in the United Kingdom represent a unique community in the country because they have emigrated not only from the Republic of Turkey but also from other former Ottoman regions; in fact, the majority of British Turks are Turkish Cypriots who migrated from the island of Cyprus from the British colonial period onwards. The second largest Turkish community descend from Turkey. There has also been ethnic Turkish migration waves from Arabic-speaking countries (such as Iraq and Syria) as well as the Balkans (including Bulgaria, Greece, and Romania). A report published by the Home Affairs Committee in 2011 claimed that there was 500,000 British Turks, made up of approximately 150,000 Turkish nationals, 300,000 Turkish Cypriots, and the remainder from other countries. As of 2013, there was a growing number of ethnic Turks from the modern diaspora in Western Europe; for example, Turks with German and Dutch citizenship (i.e. Turkish Germans and Turkish Dutch) had also immigrated to Britain in accordance with the freedom of movement under EU law.

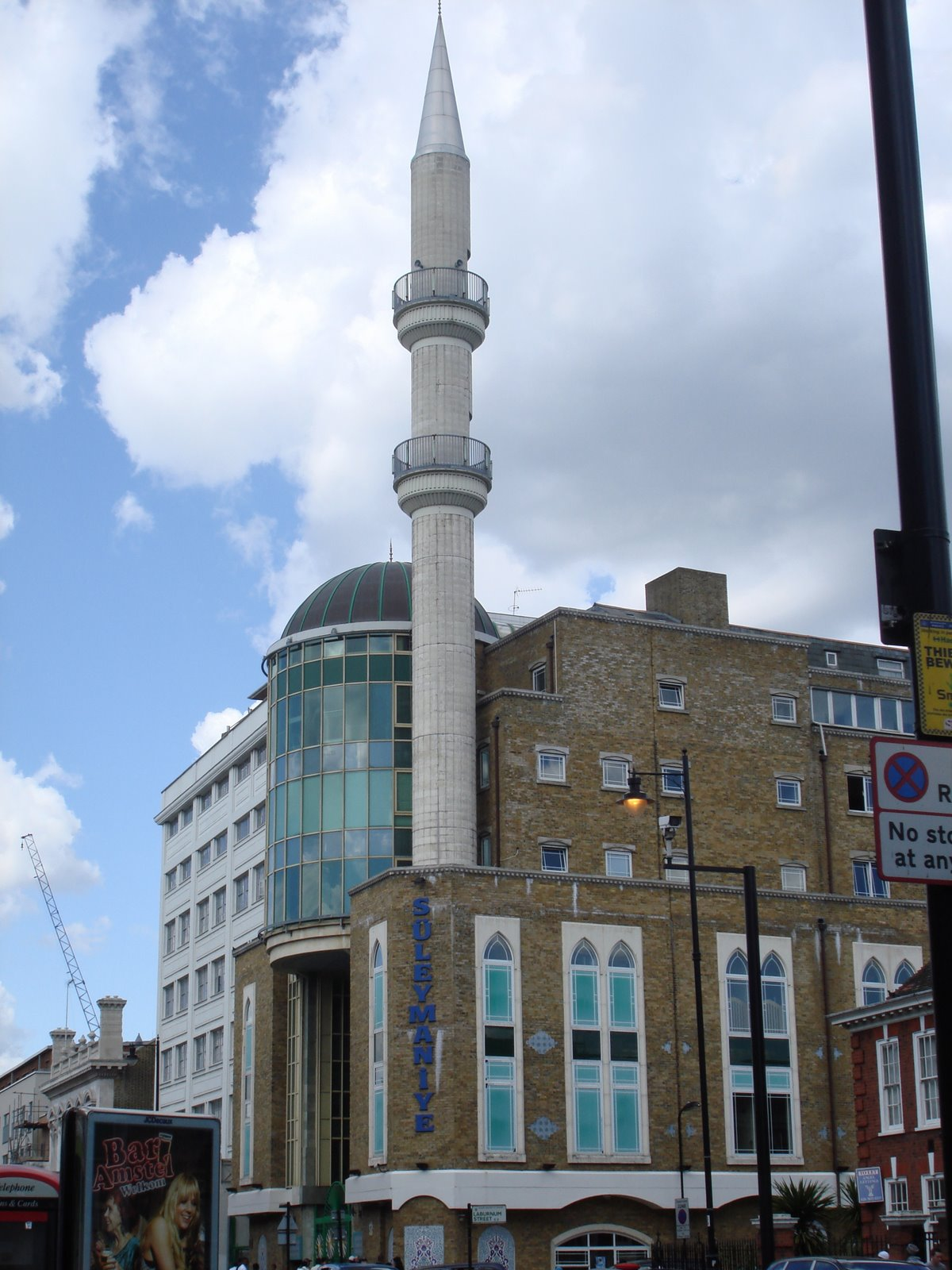
Suleymaniye Mosque in Hoxton, London

Turkish Cypriots first began to migrate to the United Kingdom in 1917. At the time, the British Empire had already annexed Cyprus and the residents of Cyprus became subjects of the Crown. Migration continued through the 1920s; during the Second World War, the number of Turkish-run cafes increased from 20 in 1939 to 200 in 1945 – creating a demand for more Turkish Cypriot workers. However, due to the Cyprus conflict, many Turkish Cypriots began to leave the island for political reasons in the 1950s, with the numbers increasing significantly after the intercommunal violence of late 1963. With the subsequent division of the island in 1974 (followed by the declaration of the Turkish Republic of Northern Cyprus in 1983) an economic embargo against the Turkish Cypriots by the Greek Cypriot controlled Republic of Cyprus, caused a further 130,000 Turkish Cypriots to leave the Island for the United Kingdom.

Migrant workers from the Republic of Turkey began to arrive in large numbers in the 1970s, followed by their family members in the late 1970s and 1980s. Many of these workers were recruited by Turkish Cypriots who had already established businesses such as restaurants. These workers were required to renew their work permits every year until they became residents after living in the country for five years. By the 1980s, intellectuals, including students, and highly educated professionals arrived in the country, most of which received support from the Turkish Cypriot community. Mainland Turks settled in similar areas of London in which the Turkish Cypriots lived in; however, many have also moved to the outer districts, such as Essex.

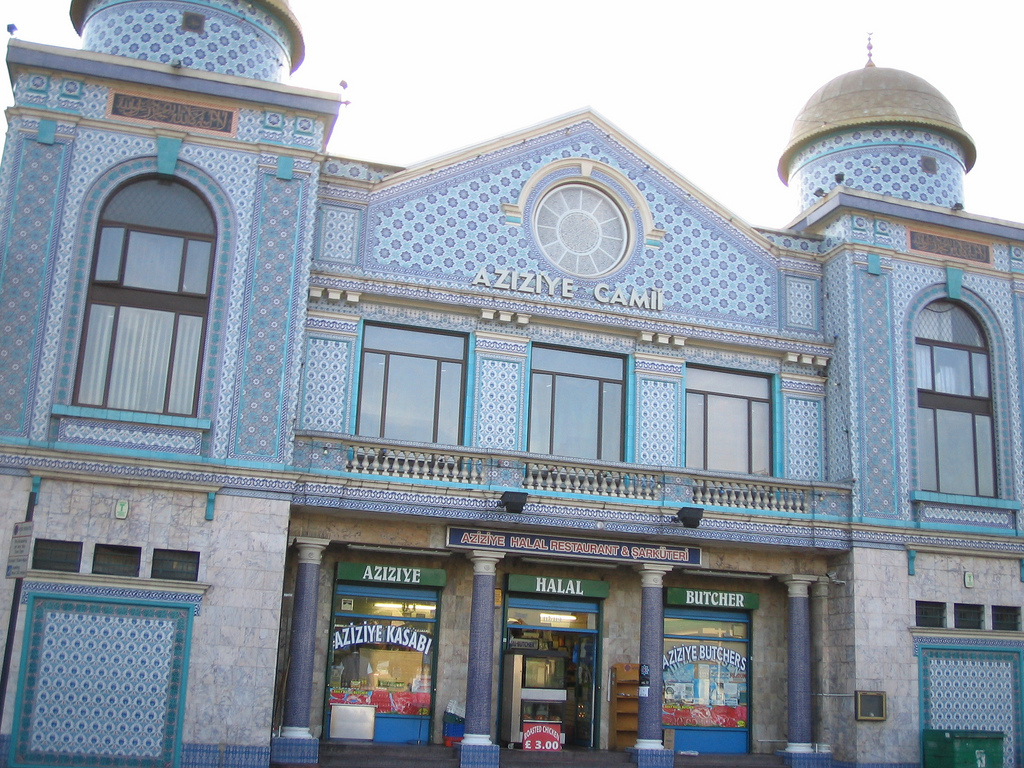
Aziziye Mosque in Stoke Newington, London

The Turkish community have established several mosques in the country. The first was Shacklewell Lane Mosque, established by the Turkish Cypriot community in 1977. There are numerous other Turkish mosques in London, mainly in Hackney, including the Aziziye Mosque and Suleymaniye Mosque. Notable Turkish mosques outside London include Selimiye Mosque in Manchester, Hamidiye Mosque in Leicester, and Osmaniye Mosque in Stoke-on-Trent.

Turks from the same districts from their homeland tend to congregate in the same quarters in the UK. The majority live in capital city of London, particularly in Hackney, Haringey, Enfield, Lewisham, Lambeth, Southwark, Croydon, Islington, Kensington, Waltham Forest, and Wood Green. Outside London there are smaller Turkish communities in Birmingham, Hertfordshire, Luton, Manchester, Sheffield and the East Midlands.

=== African ===
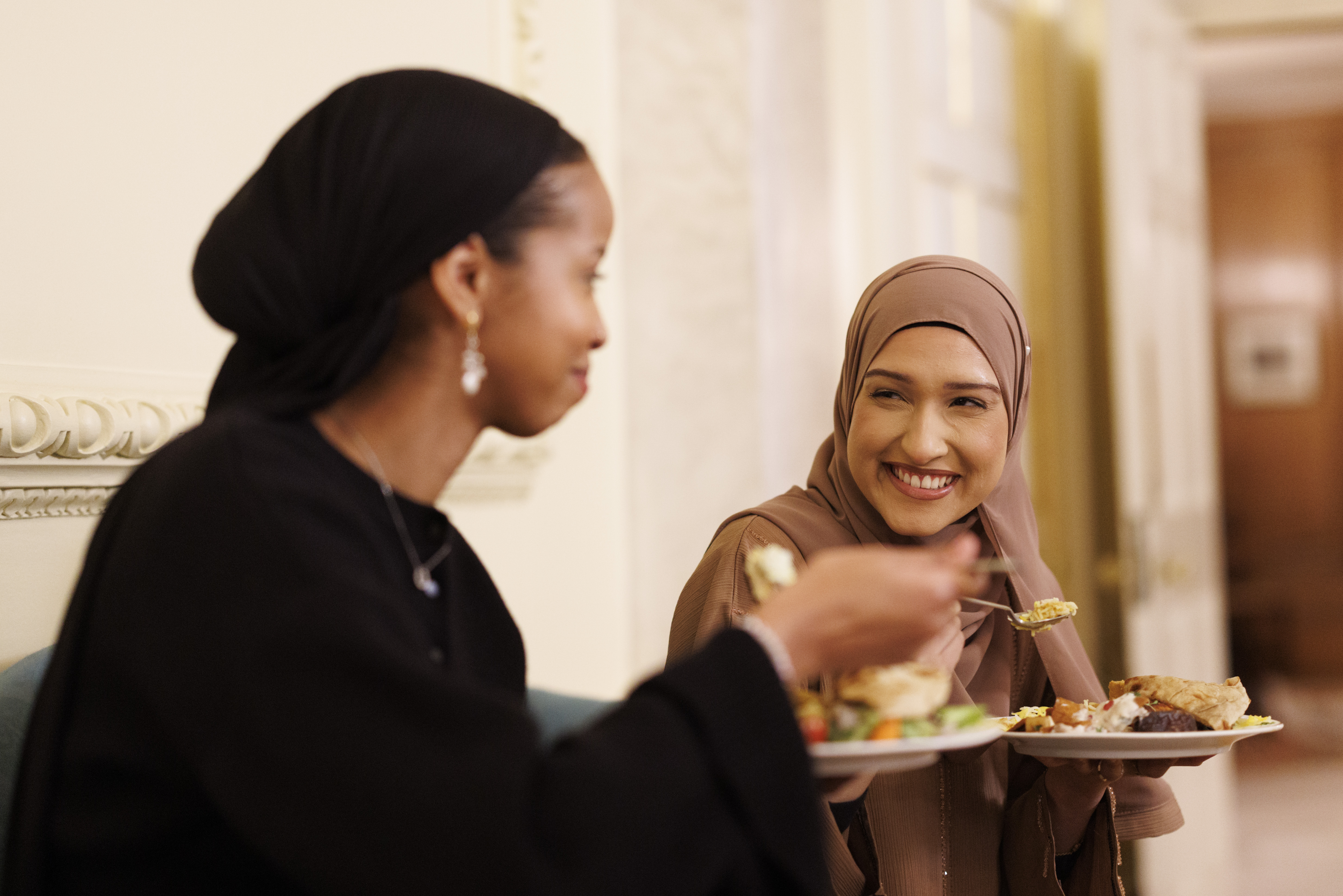
A hijab-wearing British Horner Muslim woman next to another hijab-wearing British Muslim woman at an iftar event in the U.K.

==== Maghrebis ====
Although data is short, findings indicate Maghrebis make up a substantial community in Europe and the United Kingdom. Britain has long ties with Maghrebis, through contact with the Maghrebis. Nevertheless, Britain has a far lower count of Maghrebis in comparison to France, the Netherlands and Spain, where the majority of Muslims are Maghrebi.

==== Nigerians ====
A 2009 government paper estimated the Nigerian Muslim community at 12,000 to 14,000 people. The community is concentrated in London.

Nigerian Muslims in the UK are represented by several community organizations including the Nigeria Muslim Forum.

==== Horners ====
Horner Muslims in the UK refer to Muslims in the U.K. who have ancestry in Horn African countries such as Eritrea, Ethiopia, Djibouti, Somalia, and to its broadest extent, includes the Atbai region of Sudan. Oromo Ethiopian immigrants to the UK are among the most evenly split ethnic groups, with roughly half of them being Christian and the other half being Muslim. A 2009 estimate by Somali community organisations puts the Somali population figure in the UK at 90,000 residents. The first Somali immigrants were seamen and traders who arrived in small numbers in port cities in the late 19th century, although most Somalis in the UK are recent arrivals. Further more Somali European such as from Holland or Denmark have been emigrating in recent years. Established Somali communities are found in Bristol, Cardiff, Liverpool and London, and newer ones have formed in Leicester, Manchester and Sheffield.

=== White European ===
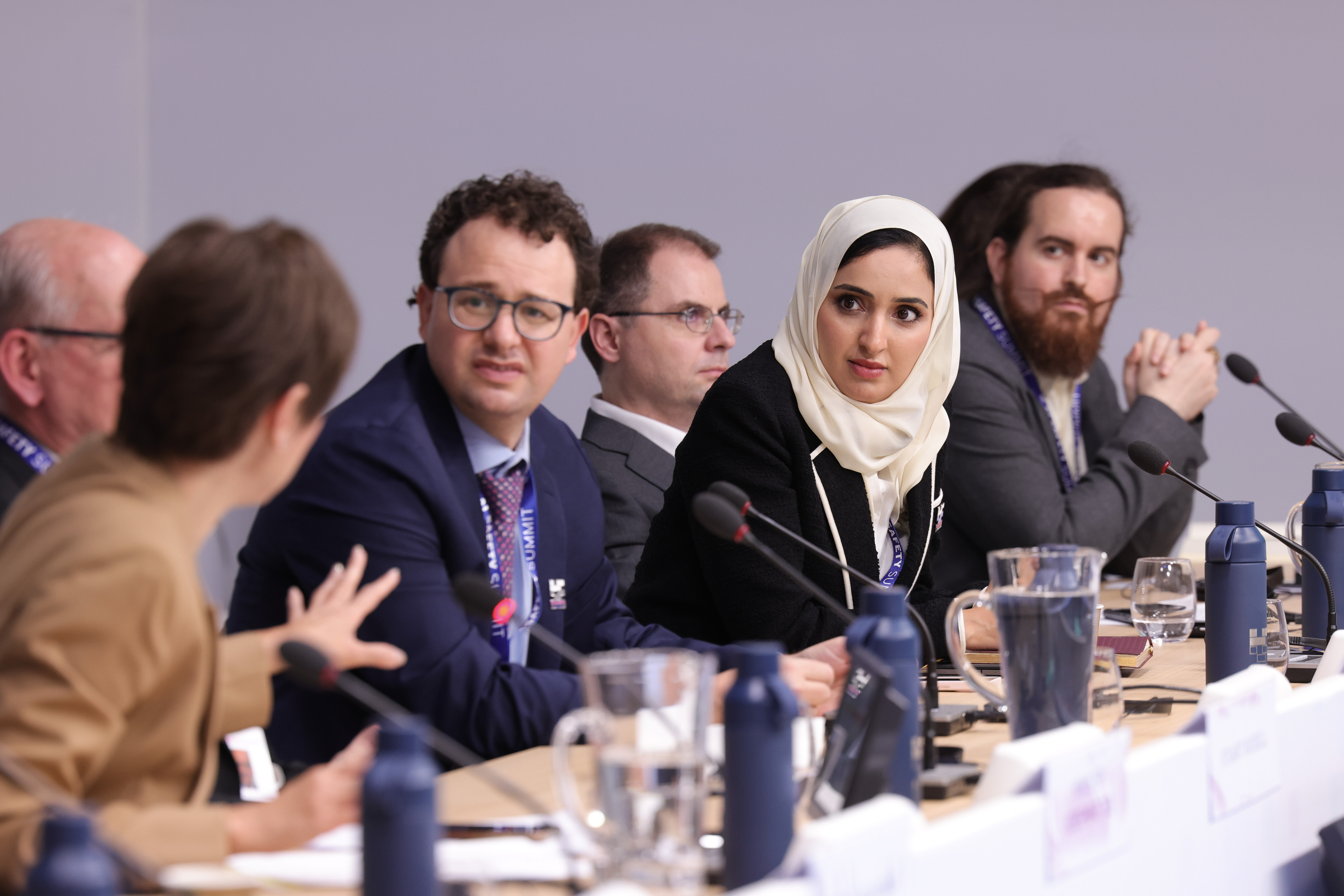
A hijab-wearing Muslim woman at an AI summit meeting in the U.K.

The history of native British Muslims has a long presence in the country. The earliest known Englishman to convert to Islam was John Nelson of the 16th century. Thomas Keith was a Scottish soldier who converted to Islam and became the governor of Medina. The pirate Jack Ward, one of the inspirations for Captain Jack Sparrow, converted to Islam in the early 1600s. Another famous convert was the Victorian explorer Richard Francis Burton who successfully completed a Hajj to Mecca in 1853, although later in life he declared himself an atheist. Abdullah Quilliam was a 19th-century Englishman who converted to Islam and built what is argued to be the first mosque in the country in Liverpool. He was known locally for his work advocating trade unionism and divorce law reform and persuaded more people in Liverpool to convert but they faced abuse from the wider society.

Ethnic composition of British Muslims over time
Ethnic group	1987 estimates		2021 census	
Ethnic group	Number	% out of total Muslims	Number	% out of total Muslims
Asian	609,440	84.9%	2,550,022	65.9%
Indian	121,760	17%	246,968	6.4%
Bangladeshi	111,360	15.5%	593,136	15.3%
Pakistani	376,320	52.5%	1,470,775	38%
Chinese	–	–	1,890	0%
Other Asian	–	–	237,253	6.1%
Other			533,505	13.8%
Arab	79,000	11%	277,737	7.2%
Other	–	–	255,768	6.6%
Black			416,327	10.8%
African	29,000	4%	378,219	9.8%
Caribbean	–	–	7,167	0.2%
Other	–	–	30,941	0.8%
White	–	–	226,233	5.8%
White British	–	–	90,939	2.4%
White Other	–	–	135,294	3.5%
Mixed			142,045	3.7%
Total	717,440	100%	3,868,132	100%

== Branches ==
British Muslims follow a range of Islamic denominations and movements. A Techne UK survey commissioned by the Institute for the Impact of Faith in Life (IIFL) found that the majority identify with Sunni Islam. A large proportion within that grouping identify with non-denominational branches, and smaller proportions identifying with Deobandi, Barelvi and Salafi currents. This translates to 83.8% that identify with broader Sunni Islam.

The survey also recorded a minority identifying with Shi'a denominations and a small proportion identifying with other sects or preferring not to state a denomination.

Denominational self-identification among British Muslims (IIFL/Techne UK), 2024
Non-denominational Sunni	48.1%
Other Sunni	16.8%
Shia	7.5%
Deobandi	6.9%
Salafi	6.6%
Barelvi	5.4%
Other denomination/sect (non-Sunni, non-Shia)	2.2%
Preferred not to say	6.3%

=== Mosque affiliation ===
A directory-based statistical summary by MuslimsInBritain.org (UK Mosque Statistics / Masjid Statistics, as at 16 September 2017) analysed 1,934 active masjids and prayer rooms in the United Kingdom and categorised each site by its dominant "theme" or affiliation (noting that many congregations are doctrinally diverse and that classification can be approximate).

In that summary, the largest shares of masjids/prayer facilities were associated with Deobandi networks (41.2%) and Barelvi networks (23.7%), followed by Salafi congregations (9.4%). Non-denominational prayer rooms and similar facilities accounted for 7.4%. Shi'a facilities comprised several categories - Twelver and other Shi'a (3.1%), Ismaili (2.3%) and Bohra (0.5%), totalling 5.9%, while smaller categories included "other Sufi" (4.1%), Arabic or African mainstream Sunni (3.1%) and Maudoodi-inspired "Islamic Movement" (2.6%).

=== Sunni ===
Sunni Islam is the largest branch of Islam in the United Kingdom. According to the survey commissioned by the Institute for the Impact of Faith in Life (IIFL), around 83.8% identified with Sunni Islam (including those who described themselves as non-denominational Sunni).

Most UK mosques are Sunni. A directory-based analysis by MuslimsInBritain.org categorised masjids and prayer rooms by their dominant "theme" or affiliation and reported that the largest shares were associated with Deobandi networks (41.2%), Barelvi networks (23.7%) and Salafi congregations (9.4%), alongside smaller Sunni categories.

=== Shia ===
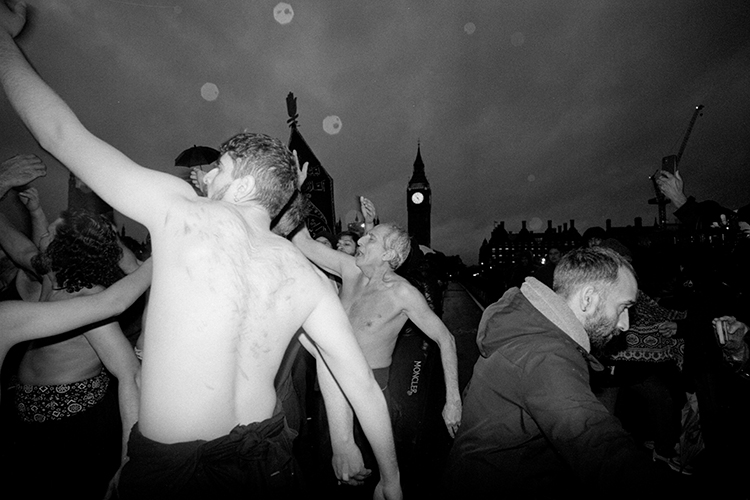
A group of Shia Muslims perform a mourning ritual (matam) on Westminster Bridge during a procession in commemoration of the martyrdom of Imam Musa Kazim.

Shi'a Islam forms a minority of British Muslims. In 2015, The Economist described Britain as having "400,000-odd" Shi'a Muslims. More recent survey evidence suggests a similar minority share, the IIFL survey found that 7.5% identified with Shi'a Islam. In the same survey, 2.4% identified as Twelver and 2.6% as Ismaili (shares of all British Muslim respondents).

Shi'a communities and institutions are most visible in major urban areas, particularly London, alongside other large cities with established Muslim populations. Prominent Shi'a centres in London include the Husaini Islamic Centre (Hujjat) in Stanmore (Harrow), the Islamic Centre of England in Maida Vale, and the Imam Khoei Islamic Centre in Queens Park (Brent). Other Shi'a mosques include Al Masjid ul Husseini in Northolt (Ealing).

Public commemorations are held annually, most notably during Ashura and Arba'een. In London, an Ashura Day procession has been policed in central areas, with the Metropolitan Police and BBC London News reporting rolling road closures for a procession from Marble Arch to Whitehall/Westminster (July 2024). An annual Arba'een procession has also been organised in London, beginning at Marble Arch. Ashura processions and related mourning rituals have also been documented in other cities, including Birmingham and Manchester.

A directory-based statistical summary by MuslimsInBritain.org categorised masjids and reported that Shi'a facilities comprised 3.1% Twelver/other Shi'a, 2.3% Ismaili and 0.5% Bohra (5.9% in total).

=== Ahmadiyyat ===
The Ahmadiyya Muslim Community (AMC) established itself in the UK in 1912 and is thus the longest-standing Muslim community in the UK. The UK and worldwide headquarters of the AMC are currently situated on the grounds of 'The Blessed Mosque' (Masjid Mubarak), inaugurated on 17 May 2019 by Mirza Masroor Ahmad, the fifth caliph of the Ahmadiyya movement, in Tilford, Surrey. The AMC also has the largest Muslim youth organisation, the Ahmadiyya Muslim Youth Association (Majlis Khuddamul Ahmadiyya) in the UK (membership of 7,500) and the largest Muslim women's organisation, the Ahmadiyya Muslim Women's Association (Lajna Ima'illah), in the UK (membership of 10,000).

In 2014, on the 125th anniversary of the Ahmadiyya Muslim Community, the group published an advertisement in Luton on Sunday. After Dr. Fiaz Hussain, coordinator of the Preservation of Finality of Prophethood Forum (PFPF), lodged a written complaint stating the Ahmadiyya community should not be called "Muslim" due to its rejection of certain Islamic principles, the paper received a delegation of "Community Leaders" and soon issued an apology, disassociating itself from the advertisement. Tell MAMA responded, labeling attempts to intimidate or discriminate against Ahmadiyya Muslims "anti-Muslim in nature."

== Society ==
=== Economics ===
British Muslims participate across the UK economy as employees, public-sector workers, professionals, entrepreneurs, consumers, donors and volunteers. Measuring "religion" in economic datasets is often difficult because many administrative and labour-market sources do not routinely record it; as a result, much of the most comparable evidence comes from Census outputs, regulators' equality monitoring releases, and research studies.

A 2013 report published by the Muslim Council of Britain highlighted the scale of British Muslims' economic contribution to the United Kingdom. It reported that the UK was home to approximately 2.78 million Muslims, with an estimated £31 billion annual contribution to the national economy. In London, there were around 13,400 Muslim-owned businesses, accounting for just over 33.6% of small and medium-sized enterprises in the capital and supporting more than 70,000 jobs. The study also estimated the presence of around 10,000 Muslim millionaires in the UK, with £3.6 billion in liquid assets among the richest individuals, and placed British Muslim consumer spending power at approximately £20.5 billion.

A 2024 report by Equi estimated that British Muslims generate at least £70 billion per year for the UK economy, attributing this to workforce income (around £42 billion), Muslim-owned business output (around £24.7 billion), and charitable giving plus the estimated value of volunteer time (around £2.4 billion combined).

==== Economic activity and employment ====
ONS analysis of Census 2021 data for England and Wales reported lower employment and higher economic inactivity among people identifying as Muslim (ages 16–64) than the overall population. The same analysis linked these patterns to the group's younger age structure, with higher shares in full-time education and higher reported inactivity because of looking after home or family, particularly among women.

Economic activity indicators (England and Wales, ages 16–64; Census 2021)
Indicator	Muslim	Overall population
In employment	51.4%	70.9%
Economically inactive (total)	41.9%	24.7%
Unemployed	6.7%	4.4%
Economically inactive: looking after home or family	16.1%	5.8%
Economically inactive: student	13.8%	7.3%
Looking after home or family (female)	27.3%	7.8%

Alongside these structural factors, parliamentary and academic research has described a "Muslim penalty" in employment outcomes in the UK, including evidence of discrimination affecting recruitment and progression and of occupational mismatch (including over-qualification) for some groups; constrained access to stable employment has also been discussed as one driver (among others) of higher self-employment in parts of the population.

==== Occupational structure and professional work ====
Among UK-born Muslims in England and Wales who were in employment at the time of Census 2021, younger cohorts were more likely than their White British counterparts to be working in the three highest occupational groups (managers, directors and senior officials; professional occupations; and associate professional and technical occupations). The combined share in these categories was 53.7% for UK-born Muslims aged 25–34, compared with 50.5% for UK-born White British of the same age band. This difference was most pronounced among women: 56.4% of UK-born Muslim women aged 25–34 in employment were in these higher-skilled occupations, compared with 52.4% of White British women, while the corresponding figures for men were 51.4% and 48.6% respectively.

In the 35–49 age group, the combined share in these three occupational categories was similar between UK-born Muslims (about 52%) and White British (about 54%), with near parity among women and a modestly lower share among Muslim men than White British men.

UK-born Muslims in higher-skilled occupations (England and Wales; employed residents only; Census 2021)
Age group	Managers, directors and senior officials	Professional occupations	Associate professional and technical	Total (three groups)
25–34	8.4%	30.3%	15.0%	53.7%
35–49	13.5%	25.5%	12.9%	51.9%

Where religion is recorded through equality monitoring, published data also show comparatively high Muslim representation in several regulated professions, particularly in parts of healthcare and pharmacy (coverage varies by regulator and declaration rates).

Representation in occupations (selected professional registers and workforce datasets)
Occupation	% of total workforce
Optometrists	21%
Licensed Doctors	18.8%
Pharmacists	18.6%
Orthoptists	15.0%
Dentists	13.4%
Biomedical Scientists	10.0%
Radiographers	9.0%
NHS	7.1%–10%
Lawyers	8%
Neurosurgeon Consultant	8.0%
Prosthetists / Orthotists	6.0%
Civil Service	5%
Midwives	2.9%
Police Officers	2.5%
Nurses	2.4%
Armed Forces	0.6%

==== Ethnicity and inference ====
Because religion is not consistently recorded outside the census and some EDI sources, some analysis uses ethnicity as a partial proxy in contexts where particular ethnic groups are predominantly Muslim. ONS multivariate tables for England and Wales (Census 2021) show that the Muslim population is ethnically diverse, with large shares recorded in Pakistani, Bangladeshi and Black African groups, alongside Arab, "White other" and other ethnic categories. Research overviews of British Muslim communities also describe major populations with family origins in Pakistan, Bangladesh and Somalia, alongside Turkish-heritage communities and others.

=== Education ===
Around 32.3% of Muslims in the UK held degree-level qualifications, according to the 2021 UK Census. This is higher than White British (31%) and Christians (31.6%). In contrast, a higher proportion of Muslims in the UK held no qualifications (25%), in comparison with White British (18.3%) and Christians (20.8%).

Higher education administrative statistics show that the proportion of UK higher education students reporting a Muslim religious belief has increased in recent years (rising from around 10% in 2019/20 to around 14% by 2023/24). Longitudinal cohort research found that around 53% of British Muslim young people were in higher education by age 19, compared with 38% of White students, with a further small share having applied but not yet enrolled. A separate analysis of the same cohort reported that about 51% of Muslim young people had applied to university by age 18 and roughly 42% were studying for a degree by age 20, with participation rates higher among Muslim women than Muslim men.

Based on official England GCSE (KS4) statistics, we can construct a clear ethnicity-based proxy for a large share of Muslim pupils by combining results for Pakistani and Bangladeshi students, who together make up a substantial portion of the Muslim school-age population. When their outcomes are averaged on a pupil-weighted basis, this proxy group outperforms White British pupils across the main attainment measures — including overall progress through secondary school, total GCSE points scored, and the likelihood of achieving strong passes in English and maths. The same datasets also show a consistent gender pattern within these cohorts, where girls achieve higher results than boys, supporting the broader observation that Muslim female pupils tend to outperform Muslim males at GCSE level.

Media reporting on England's secondary school performance tables noted that four Islamic faith schools were ranked among the national top ten for Progress 8 scores, with Tauheedul Islam Girls' High School ranked first nationally on that measure.

There are about 184 Muslim faith schools in the UK in total, of which around 30 are state-funded and about 150 are independent (private) schools. Separately, media reporting based on a Sunday Times analysis has highlighted that some non-Muslim state schools—particularly Church of England and Roman Catholic schools in areas with large Muslim catchments—have intakes in which Muslim pupils outnumber Christian pupils, illustrating how local demographics can produce very high Muslim enrolment even where a school is not formally designated as Islamic.

=== Politics ===
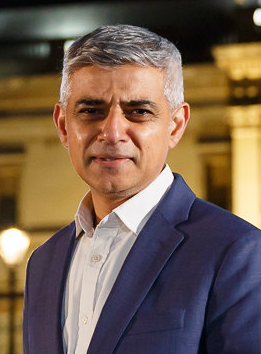
Sadiq Khan, current Mayor of London

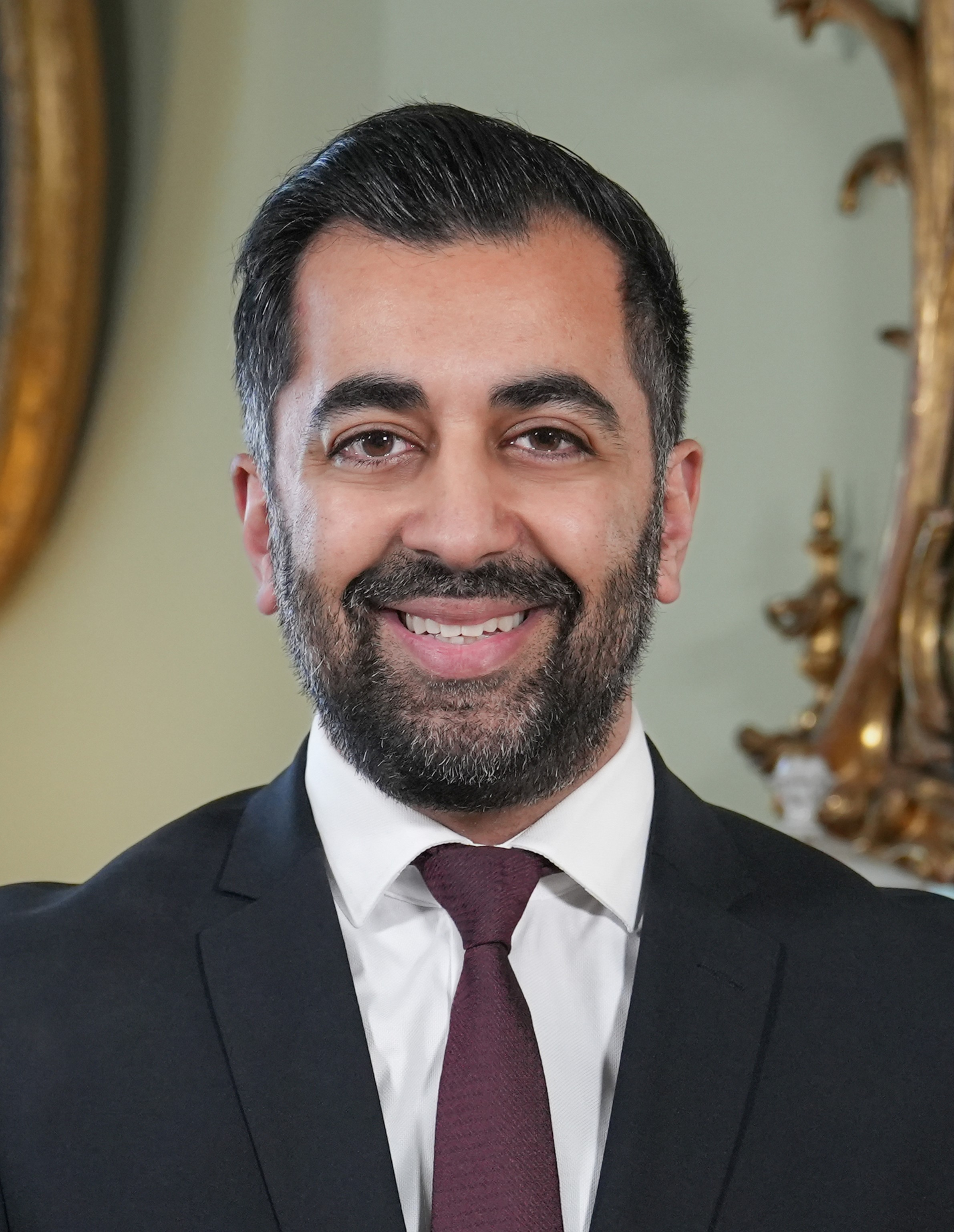
Humza Yousaf, former First Minister of Scotland

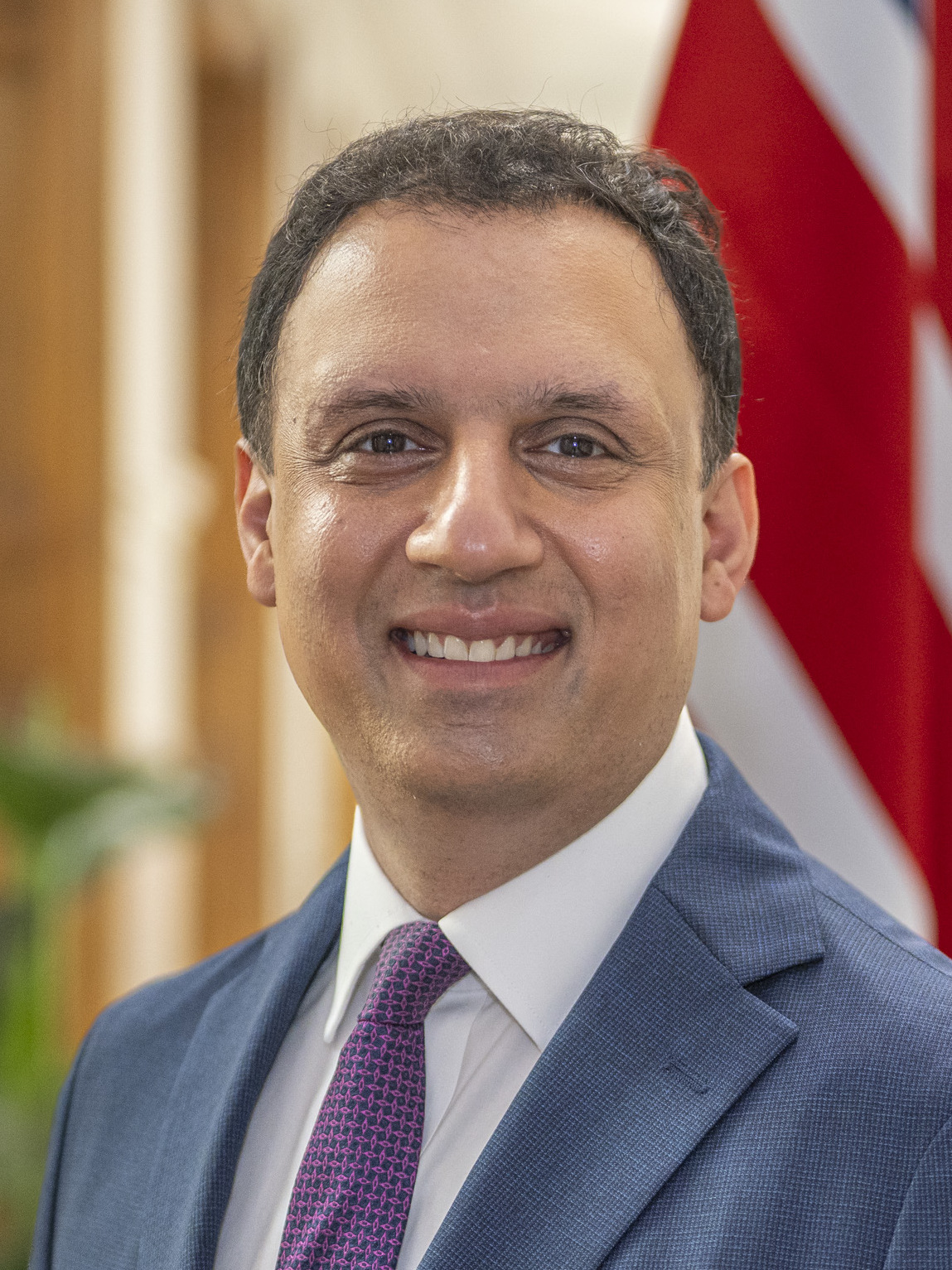
Anas Sarwar, former Leader of the Scottish Labour Party

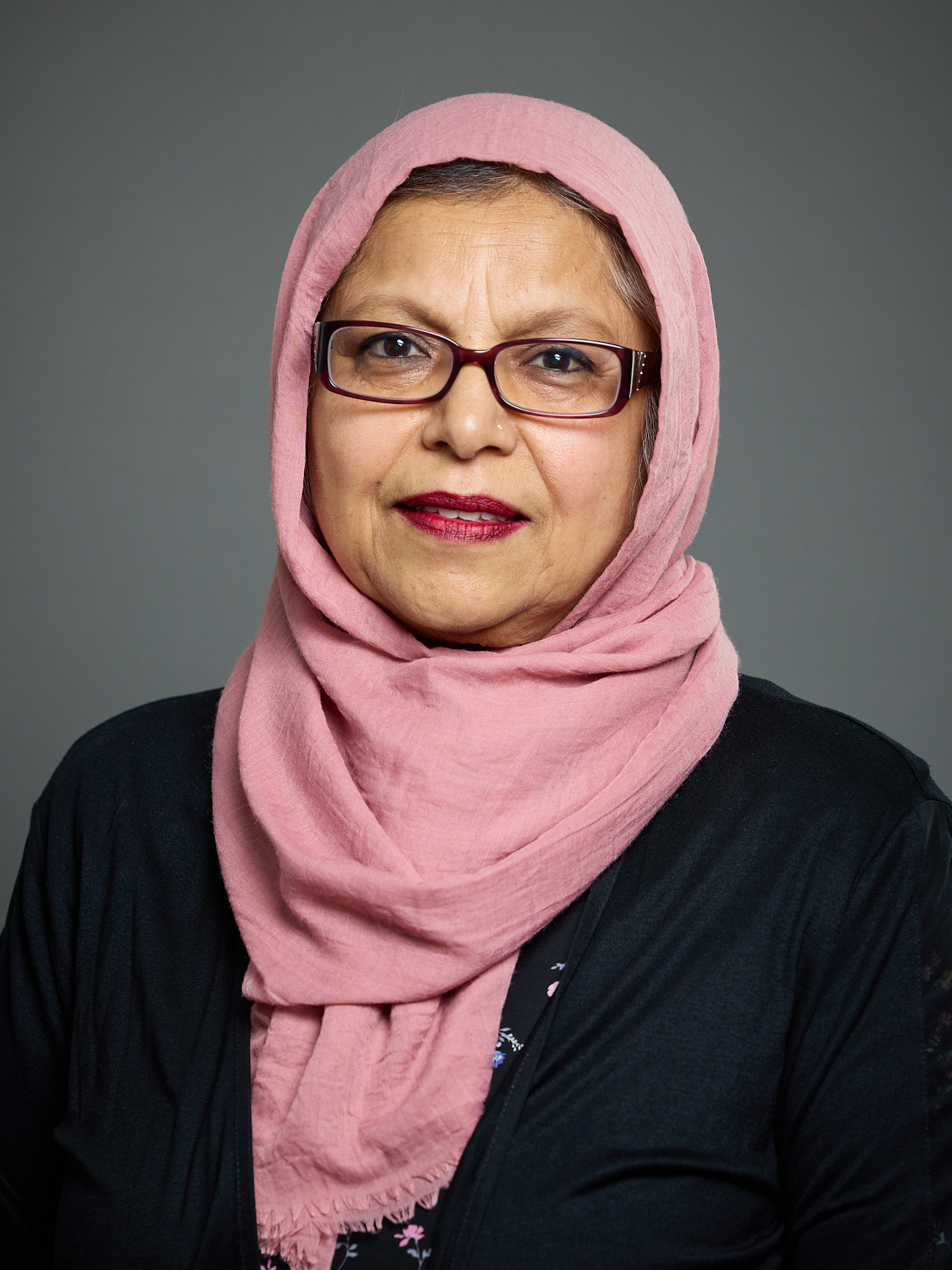
Pola Uddin, Baroness Uddin was the first Muslim woman to sit in the Parliament of the United Kingdom.

Muslims are playing an increasingly prominent role in political life. Nineteen Muslim MPs were elected in the December 2019 general election, and there are nineteen Muslim peers in the House of Lords.

The majority of British Muslims vote for the Labour Party, however there are some high-profile Conservative Muslims, including former Minister for Faith and Communities and former Co-chairman and the Conservative Party Sayeeda Warsi, described by The Guardian as a 'rising star' in the Tory party. Warsi, who was the first Muslim to serve in a British cabinet, was appointed by David Cameron in 2010 as a minister without portfolio. She was made a senior minister of state in 2012. In August 2014 she resigned over the government's approach to the 2014 Israel-Gaza conflict.

Muslim political parties in Britain have included the People's Justice Party (UK), a Pakistani and Kashmiri party that won city council seats in Manchester in the 2000s, and the unsuccessful Islamic Party of Britain, an Islamist party in Bradford in the 1990s. In 2023, the Electoral Commission rejected an application to set up a new political party named 'Party of Islam'.

In the 2017 general election, 15 Muslim MPs (12 Labour and 3 Conservative) were elected, up from 13 Muslim MPs in 2015 general election. In the 2019 general election, a record number of 19 Muslim MPs were elected (15 Labour and 4 Conservative).

Survey data analysed by UK in a Changing Europe showed that Labour (72 per cent) led Conservatives (11 per cent) by 61 points amongst Muslim voters in 2019. Further analysis showed that many minorities were "necessity liberals" who voted for Labour not because they were social liberals, but because Labour represented a broader political package and distrusted the Conservatives on identity matters. British Pakistani and British Bangladeshi voters in particular, by a margin of 20–30 points, believed that LGBT rights had gone too far.

At the 2024 general election, 24 Muslim MPs were elected including a record four independent pro-Palestinian MPs. All of the elected independent MPs were endorsed by The Muslim Vote, a pressure group set up in December 2023 in response to the Gaza war. Polling by Savanta found that 44 per cent of Muslim voters ranked the matter among their top five issues compared to 12 per cent of non-Muslims.

Muslim MPs by election 1997–2024
Election	Labour	Conservative	Scottish National Party	Other	Total	% of Parliament
1997	1	0	0	0	1	0.15
2001	2	0	0	0	2	0.31
2005	4	0	0	0	4	0.62
2010	6	2	0	0	8	1.23
2015	9	3	1	0	13	2.00
2017	12	3	0	0	15	2.31
2019	14	5	0	0	19	2.92
2024	18	2	0	4	24	3.69

A February 2024 poll showed that 14% of Muslim voters voted for the Green Party and 38% no longer supported the Labour Party. In September 2024, Sky News reported that Green Party's anti-Gaza war stance has attracted a significant amount of Muslim voters who previously voted for Labour Party. When Green Party politician Mothin Ali was elected as Leeds City Council member, The Daily Telegraph noted that he called his victory a "win for the people of Gaza" and chanted takbir. In October 2025, unnamed Green Party members told Hyphen that the party has seen an increase in Muslim voters since Mothin Ali was elected to be its deputy leader. Faaiz Hasan, a member of "Muslim Greens" group within the party, said the party is becoming popular in communities with high amount of Muslims, like Barking and Dagenham.

British Muslim vote by general election
Election year	Conservative	Labour	Green	Lib Dem	Reform	SNP	Other
2001	10% to 15%	70% to 75%	<5%	8% to 11%	—	—	<5%
2005	11%	59%	—	21%	—	—	9%
2010	11% to 13%	60% to 64%	—	15% to 18%	—	—	5% – 7%
2015	25%	64%	<6%	<5%	—	—	<6%
2017	11%	85%	<2%	<3%	—	<2%	<2%
2019	6%	86%	<2%	6%	—	—	<2%
2024	6% to 8%	58% to 60%	12%	<5%	—	—	14% to 16%

=== Law ===
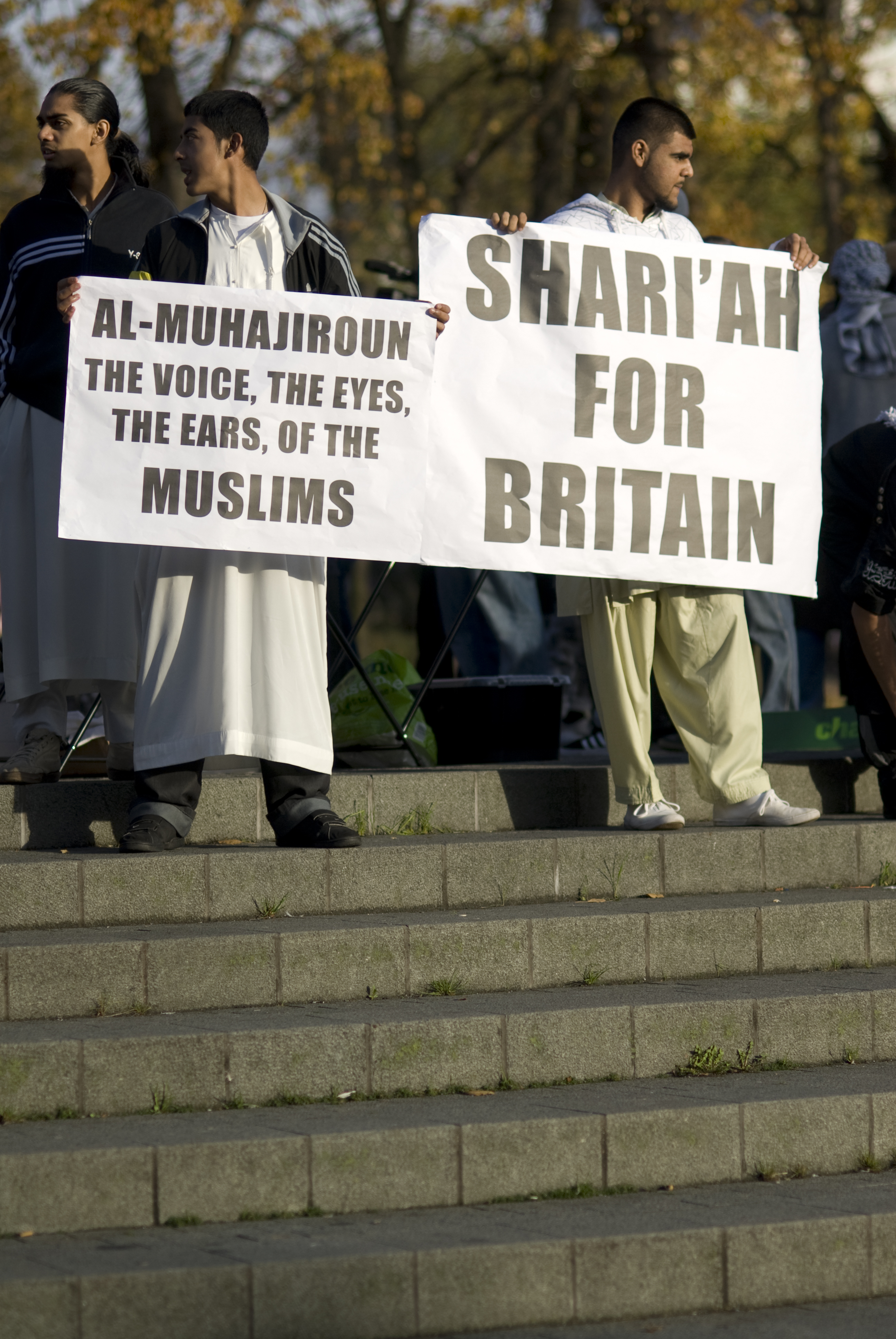
Public demonstration in the United Kingdom for sharia, October 2009

The first sharia court, also known as sharia councils, began operating in the United Kingdom in 1982, and the number in operation has grown to 85 by 2024. A The Times investigation has found that there are a growing number of Muslims from across Europe and North America seeking the services of British sharia courts, with the UK now dubbed as the 'western capital' for sharia courts.

Although sharia is not part of the British legal system, several British establishment figures have supported its use in areas of dispute resolution in Islamic communities. For example, in February 2008 Rowan Williams the Archbishop of Canterbury (the head of the Church of England) lectured at the Royal Courts of Justice on Islam and English law. In this lecture he spoke of the possibility of using sharia in some circumstances:

[...] it might be possible to think in terms of [...] a scheme in which individuals retain the liberty to choose the jurisdiction under which they will seek to resolve certain carefully specified matters, so that 'power-holders are forced to compete for the loyalty of their shared constituents'.

— Rowan Williams, 2008

Several months later, Lord Phillips, then Lord Chief Justice of England and Wales supported the idea that sharia could be reasonably employed as a basis for "mediation or other forms of alternative dispute resolution", and explained that "It is not very radical to advocate embracing sharia law in the context of family disputes, for example, and our system already goes a long way towards accommodating the archbishop's suggestion."

In March 2014, The Law Society issued guidance on how to draft sharia-compliant wills for the network of sharia courts which been established to deal with disputes between Muslim families. The guidance was withdrawn later in 2014 following criticism by solicitors and by Chris Grayling, the Justice Secretary.

In its 2017 manifesto, UKIP pledged to abolish the existence of sharia courts in the UK.

In 2016–2018 an independent panel commissioned by the UK government investigated the practices of sharia councils operating in England and Wales. The councils have no legal status and no legal jurisdiction in the UK. Estimates for their number range between 30 and 85. The investigation found that most people consulting the councils are women seeking an Islamic divorce. The review concluded that "there is unanimous agreement among the sharia councils themselves that discriminatory practices do occur in some instances within the councils in England and Wales" and made legislative and administrative recommendations to remedy the abuses. The panel was not aware of any sharia councils operating in Scotland.

According to Kaveri Qureshi, while women educate themselves and follow Islamic norms and values referring to colonial era Islamic advice literature about marriage not for continuation but to end their marriages and for justification of remarriages contrary to original intention of authors of the literature.

=== Media and culture ===
There are several Islamic television channels operating in the UK, including British Muslim TV, Muslim Television Ahmadiyya International (MTA International), Ummah Channel, Ahlebait TV, and Fadak.

British Muslims are represented in various media positions across different organisations. Notable examples include Mehdi Hasan, the political editor of the UK version of The Huffington Post and the presenter of Al Jazeera English shows The Café and Head to Head, Mishal Husain, a British news presenter for the BBC, currently appearing on BBC World News and BBC Weekend News, Rageh Omaar, special correspondent with ITV and formerly Senior Foreign Correspondent with the BBC and a reporter/presenter for Al Jazeera English, and Faisal Islam, economics editor and correspondent for Channel 4 News.

In 2013, there were 40 Muslim players in the English Premier League, up from one in 1992. Man of the Match awardees were awarded bottles of champagne, which is forbidden in Islam, and after Muslim player Yaya Toure refused the award, champagne was phased out for small trophies instead. Children playing football have been seen falling to their knees as if in prayer after scoring a goal, a common practice of Muslim footballers.

=== Associations ===
- Ahmadiyya Muslim Association
- Association of British Muslims, the oldest organisation of British Muslims, created in 1889 as the English Islamic Association by Abdullah Quilliam.
- Association of Muslim Lawyers
- British Muslim Forum
- Civil Service Islamic Society
- Daru-Al-Moameneen
- Islamic Forum of Europe
- Islamic Party of Britain
- Islamic Society of Britain
- Minhaj-ul-Quran UK
- Mosques & Imams National Advisory Board
- Muslim Association of Britain
- Muslim Council of Britain
- Muslim Educational Trust
- Muslim Parliament of Great Britain
- Muslim Public Affairs Committee UK
- Muslim Safety Forum
- New Crescent Society, a British Muslim organisation focused on local crescent-moon sighting and the Islamic calendar
- Sufi Muslim Council
- The Young Muslims UK
- UK Islamic Mission
- World Islamic Mission
- Young Muslim Organisation

=== Proselytisation ===
An estimated 5,200 Britons convert to Islam each year, with around 100,000 converts reported by 2013. For men, prisons have been a notable setting for conversions. Approximately 18% of the British prison population, or over 14,000 prisoners, are Muslims, disproportionately higher than the general population. The proportion of Muslims in the UK prison population rose from 8% in 2002 to 15% in 2016. According to the UK prison officers' union in 2013, some Muslim prisoners in the UK had allegedly forcibly converted fellow inmates to Islam in prisons. There have been multiple cases of non-Muslim prisoners threatened with violence with "convert or get hurt" being a commonly used phrase by Muslim gangs according to an independent report published by the government. A 2010 report by the Chief Inspector of Prisons stated that 30% of the Muslim prisoners interviewed had converted to Islam while in prison, some of whom were "convenience Muslims" who adopted the religion in order to get benefits available only to Muslims. Other reasons why inmates may convert include wanting protection in wings where Muslim gangs are prevalent, the ability to go to chapel, and access to different foods. Around one in five Muslim prisoners in the UK are now white.

Mosques in the country are sometimes seen as ethnic clubs which are not welcoming of new converts but there have also been recent convert-led mosques. A study in 2023 found that amongst some schools, there were tensions between Hindu and Muslim pupils. Hindu students were labelled as "kaffirs" and threatened to either convert or face "hell for disbelievers".

=== Extremist ideology ===
In June 2017, Jeremy Corbyn, leader of the Labour Party, said that difficult conversations are needed, starting with Saudi Arabia and other Gulf states that have funded and fuelled extremist ideology, and has also urged an immediate halt to UK arms exports to Saudi Arabia. Tom Brake, Liberal Democrat foreign affairs spokesman, has said that Saudi Arabia provides funding to hundreds of mosques in the UK, espousing a very hardline Wahhabist interpretation of Islam. In July 2017, a report by the Henry Jackson Society, a neo-conservative think tank, claimed that Middle Eastern nations are financially supporting mosques and educational institutions linked to spreading extremist material with "an illiberal, bigoted Wahhabi ideology". The report said that the number of Salafi and Wahhabi mosques in Britain had increased from 68 in 2007 to 110 in 2014.

In 2017, Gilles de Kerchove reported that the UK had the highest number of Islamist radicals in the EU, with estimates ranging between 20,000 and 25,000. Of these, 3,000 were considered a direct threat by MI5, and 500 were under constant surveillance. Among those identified by security services but not seen as an immediate threat were the perpetrators of three ISIS-linked attacks in 2017, which resulted in 35 deaths. Between 2011 and 2014, more British Muslims traveled to Syria to join ISIS and Al-Nusra Front than enlisted in the British Armed Forces, with around 1,500 joining these groups compared to 220 who enlisted in the military.

Political scientists Olivier Roy and Gilles Kepel offer differing perspectives on the roots of radical Islamist terrorism. Roy argues that many individuals are drawn to fundamentalist Islam only after becoming radicalized, while Kepel suggests that certain ideologies, like Salafism, may lead individuals to violence. Roy also noted that restrictive policies like France's burkini ban might provoke religious violence, but Kepel countered that the UK has experienced jihadist attacks despite having no such policies.

A 2020 report indicated that British Muslims share similar concerns with the general population regarding Muslim extremism, with 63% expressing some level of worry. British Muslims were also slightly more likely (66%) than others (63%) to report individuals to the Prevent programme if concerned about radicalization, and 80% supported Prevent once they understood its goals. Additionally, as of 2023, Muslim extremism represents a significant portion of MI5's caseload and related arrests, with nine-tenths of the individuals on its watchlist linked to this type of extremism.

In March 2024, Communities Secretary Michael Gove announced that five organisations would be assessed against the government's new definition of extremism. Three of these organisations, named as Cage, Muslim Association of Britain, and Muslim Engagement and Development, were of concern due to their Islamist orientation and views. The latter two groups threatened to sue after the announcement.

==== Antisemitism ====
British Muslim journalist Mehdi Hasan has argued that "anti-Semitism isn't just tolerated in some sections of the British Muslim community; it's routine and commonplace". Quantitative research has reported higher prevalence of some antisemitic attitudes among British Muslims than among the general public. The Institute for Jewish Policy Research (JPR), drawing on a 2016 nationally representative survey of 5,446 adults, reported that a higher share of Muslim respondents endorsed at least one antisemitic attitude than the population average, and found associations between higher levels of religiosity and endorsement of some antisemitic stereotypes. Other polling has suggested more mixed attitudes: a 2020 survey commissioned by Hope not Hate reported that 45% of British Muslims held a favourable view of British Jews, while 18% held an unfavourable view.

Following the 7 October 2023 Hamas attack and the subsequent Israel–Hamas war, UK public debate intensified around antisemitism, anti-Zionism, and the boundaries between hate speech and political expression about Israel and Palestine. The Community Security Trust (CST) recorded a record annual total of 4,298 antisemitic incidents in 2023 and reported that incident levels remained elevated in 2024 (3,556) and 2025 (3,700), with many incidents referencing Israel/Palestine or the war while also evidencing anti-Jewish motivation or targeting. Over the same period, monitoring organisations reported sharp increases in anti-Muslim hate, which they linked in part to the conflict and related online and offline hostility.

Large pro-Palestinian demonstrations across the UK after October 2023 prompted scrutiny of protest slogans and symbols. In October 2023, Home Secretary Suella Braverman wrote to the Metropolitan Police Commissioner stating that chants such as "from the river to the sea" could, depending on context, be interpreted as expressing a violent desire to eliminate Israel and might amount to a racially aggravated public order offence, while also emphasising that policing decisions must be evidence-led. Civil liberties groups have argued that the phrase is not, by itself, unlawful and that criminality depends on context (e.g., threats, harassment, or incitement), warning that overly broad interpretations risk chilling lawful protest and expression.

Human rights organisations have also criticised what they describe as an expanding use of counter-terrorism and antisemitism frameworks to restrict Palestinian solidarity activism. Amnesty International and the International Federation for Human Rights (FIDH), among others, argued that measures taken in several Western countries—including the UK—risked conflating non-violent political advocacy with extremism, and that accusations of antisemitism were sometimes applied in ways that undermined freedom of expression and assembly; these claims have been disputed by government and some Jewish communal organisations, who argue that robust enforcement is necessary given heightened antisemitic threats.

These debates intensified after the UK government proscribed the direct-action group Palestine Action under the Terrorism Act 2000 in July 2025. In February 2026, the High Court ruled that the proscription decision was unlawful and disproportionate, but left the ban temporarily in place pending further proceedings and a government appeal; civil liberties groups welcomed the ruling, while ministers defended the original proscription as a response to serious criminal damage and intimidation.

In March 2024, the Deputy Prime Minister Oliver Dowden ordered the suspension of the Civil Service Muslim Network (CSMN) pending an investigation into allegations that webinars and related activity included antisemitic tropes and political activism aimed at influencing government policy on Israel/Palestine. In a September 2024 parliamentary answer, the government stated that the CSMN had voluntarily suspended activity earlier in the year and had since resumed with senior sponsors appointed to ensure compliance with relevant guidance on impartiality.

== Relations with wider society ==
=== Attitudes of British Muslims ===
Recent survey research indicates that many British Muslims place strong emphasis on religious identity, while levels of belonging and perceived safety have varied across studies and over time. A 2025 study by the Institute for the Impact of Faith in Life (IIFL), based on a national survey of British Muslims, found that a majority of respondents prioritised a Muslim identity over a British identity when asked which described them "first and foremost", with notable variation by age group; the report linked identity patterns partly to experiences of prejudice and exclusion.

Earlier polling in the mid-2010s reported high levels of national attachment among British Muslims. A 2016 ICM poll found that 86% of British Muslims said they felt a strong sense of belonging to Britain, while a 2016 Policy Exchange survey reported that 93% expressed a strong attachment to Britain. By contrast, a 2026 survey by Muslim Census reported that 51.9% of respondents said they "strongly" felt they belonged in the UK, with a further proportion selecting less emphatic options; 71.9% said they felt safe in their local area, while 11% disagreed. Analysts have noted that differences in question wording, sampling methods and response scales make direct comparison between surveys difficult.

A separate 2024 IIFL survey reported that large majorities of British Muslim respondents viewed Britain as a country offering good opportunities to progress in life and supported greater efforts to improve interfaith relations, alongside high reported levels of charitable giving and community participation.

Polling during the Israel–Hamas war period indicated that the conflict became a highly salient political issue for many British Muslims. A Savanta poll of British Muslim voters reported that the Gaza conflict ranked among the most important election issues for a large share of respondents, and that many said they would consider supporting independent candidates based on positions related to the conflict. A 2024 poll of UK Muslims published by the Henry Jackson Society, based on fieldwork by J.L. Partners, also reported strong pro-Palestinian sympathies among respondents when asked to choose between parties to the conflict, with results varying significantly by age and education level.

==== Extremism, social attitudes and family norms ====
Reviews of British survey data have found that only a small minority of Muslims express sympathy for terrorism, and that large majorities report concern about extremism. An Ipsos MORI review of multiple UK surveys reported that across studies only a "tiny percentage" of Muslim respondents showed support or sympathy for terrorist violence; it cited a 2016 study in which 90% of Muslim respondents condemned threatening or committing terrorist actions and 2% expressed sympathy, compared with 84% condemnation and 4% sympathy in a general-population comparison sample. Research for the Commission for Countering Extremism by Crest Advisory (2020) found that most British Muslim respondents said they were worried about Islamist extremism and that majorities expressed conditional or full support for the Prevent programme after a neutral description, with most also saying they would report concerns about radicalisation.

On social and family issues, survey reviews indicate that British Muslims are, on average, more likely than the general population to express socially conservative views on some questions, though attitudes vary by age and gender. The Ipsos MORI review reported that close to half of Muslim men and around one third of Muslim women agreed with the statement that "wives should always obey their husbands", and noted generational differences with younger Muslims tending to hold more liberal views on several topics than older cohorts. The same review also found that a majority of Muslims disagreed that homosexuality should be legal in Britain, with 38% strongly disagreeing and 14% tending to disagree, compared to 8% who strongly agreed and 10% who tended to agree. By contrast, 73% of the overall adult population, and 67% of Christians, supported legality in a comparable control sample. Younger Muslims were more likely to express supportive views, with 28% of those aged 18-24 and 23% of those aged 25-34 agreeing that homosexuality should be legal. Some more recent polls have also reported sizeable minorities supporting religion-accommodating public policy measures, though results differ depending on methodology and question wording.

Research on domestic violence and abuse in UK Muslim communities has largely been based on qualitative and service-provider studies rather than single-question attitude polling. This literature highlights barriers to reporting and help-seeking, including stigma, family pressure, and the ways religious language may be used both to justify abuse and to support survivors.

==== Longitudinal survey findings ====
Large UK longitudinal datasets have also been used to analyse outcomes and experiences among Muslims over time. Studies using the UK Household Longitudinal Study (Understanding Society) have reported evidence of a persistent "Muslim penalty" in unemployment and economic inactivity compared with otherwise similar non-Muslims, even after adjusting for demographic and educational factors. Other analyses using the same dataset have found lower average mental wellbeing among some Muslim-origin groups compared with the non-religious, alongside evidence that more frequent religious attendance is associated with higher wellbeing across groups.

=== Attitudes towards British Muslims ===
The British media has been criticised for propagating negative stereotypes of Muslims and fueling Islamophobic prejudice. In 2006, several British cabinet ministers were criticised for helping to "unleash a public anti-Muslim backlash" by blaming the Muslim community over issues of integration despite a study commissioned by the Home Office on white and Asian-Muslim youths demonstrating otherwise: that Asian-Muslim youths "are in fact the most tolerant of all" and that white youths "have far more intolerant attitudes," concluding that the attitudes held by members of the white community was a greater "barrier to integration."

In January 2010, the British Social Attitudes Survey found that the general public "is far more likely to hold negative views of Muslims than of any other religious group," with "just one in four" feeling "positively about Islam," and a "majority of the country would be concerned if a mosque was built in their area, while only 15 per cent expressed similar qualms about the opening of a church." The perceived "scapegoating" of British Muslims by the media and politicians in the 21st century has been compared in the media to the rise of antisemitism in the early 20th century.

A 2013 survey by YouGov indicated that immigrants from Muslim countries were perceived as integrating less well into British society than immigrants from other countries, with 71% of respondents believing migrants from Muslim countries were not integrating well. Another YouGov poll conducted in 2015 found that 55% of the British public believed there was a fundamental clash between Islam and the values of British society. Only 22% believed British values and Islam were generally compatible.

In 2015, in light of a growing number of radicalised British Muslims joining ISIS to fight in Syria, a Survation poll for Sky News found that 70% of non-Muslims in the UK believed that British Muslims were not doing enough to integrate into British society, 44% became more suspicious of Muslims and only 30% believed that the values of British society were compatible with Islam. When British Muslims were asked the same questions, over four in five believed that Islamic values were compatible with British society and 71% believed that British Muslims were doing enough to integrate into British society.

In polling conducted by ComRes in 2016, only 28% of those surveyed believed that Islam was compatible with British values. 72% agreed with the statement that "most people in the UK have a negative view of Islam" and 43% believed that Islam was a negative force in the UK. Younger people were more likely to say they have a better understanding of Islam and hold less negative views.

A survey conducted in 2017 by Chatham House revealed widespread opposition to Muslim immigration across the UK. 47% were opposed to further Muslim immigration meanwhile 23% disagreed with stopping further migration from mainly Muslim countries. This opposition figure was lower than in other European countries, Austria: 65%; Belgium: 64%; France: 61%; Germany: 53%; Italy: 51%, and lower than the European average of 55%.

In 2019, a survey conducted by the Pew Research Center found that 78% of Britons had a favourable view of Muslims, while 18% had an unfavourable view of Muslims. This was the most favourable in Europe.

A 2021 study published by the University of Birmingham found that Muslims are the British public's second 'least liked' group, after Gypsy and Irish Travellers with 25.9% of the British public holding negative views towards Muslims and 23.5% holding a positive view. People from middle and upper-class backgrounds were more likely to hold prejudiced views about Islam compared to those from working-class backgrounds. 71% of respondents named Islam as having a more negative impact on society compared to other religions with 18.1% of those surveyed supported banning all Muslim migration to the UK.

In 2025, a study by the Commission for Countering Extremism with polling conducted by Ipsos found that 38 per cent of Britons felt they had to hold back on expressing their views about Islamic topics. This was the highest figure across all religions, and about twice as high as the comparative figure for Christianity. In the study, Muslims surveyed were more likely than the overall population to think that people should be careful not to offend when talking about Islamic topics (71 per cent compared to 31 per cent overall). Islam was also the only religion asked about where more people thought that the religion was protected too much, with 39 per cent believing it was protected "too much" and 18 per cent believing it was protected "too little".

=== Islamophobia ===
A survey conducted in 2024 by Opinium for Hope not Hate found that 30 per cent of the British public believed that Islam was a threat to the British way of life and the existence of 'no-go' zones for non-Muslims in European cities. Members of the Conservative party were more likely to hold these views, with 58% believing Islam was a threat and 52% believing in the existence of 'no-go' zones.

There have been cases of threats, one fatal attack, and non-fatal attacks on Muslims and on Muslim targets, including attacks on Muslim graves and mosques. In January 2010, a report from the University of Exeter's European Muslim Research Centre noted that the number of anti-Muslim hate crimes has increased, ranging from "death threats and murder to persistent low-level assaults, such as spitting and name-calling," for which the media and politicians have been blamed with fuelling anti-Muslim hatred. However, Met Police figures showed an 8.5 per cent fall in anti-Muslim crimes between 2009 and 2012, with a spike in 2013 due to the murder of Lee Rigby. In the four months following the 2023 Israel-Gaza conflict, Tell MAMA reported a more than three-fold increase in Islamophobic incidents to 2,010, with Muslim women targeted in two-thirds of incidents.

The emergence of the English Defence League resulted in demonstrations in English cities with large Muslim populations. The EDL was a right wing, anti Islam street protest movement which opposed what it considers to be a spread of Islamism, Sharia law and Islamic extremism in the United Kingdom. The EDL has been described by The Jewish Chronicle as Islamophobic. The group has faced confrontations with various groups, including supporters of Unite Against Fascism (UAF) and Anonymous.

=== Relations between Muslims and Sikhs ===
Most British Muslims, particularly those of South Asian descent, share cultural traditions, histories, and ethnic ties with the British Sikh community, as well as with British Hindus. The majority of Sikhs oppose strongly anti-Muslim groups like the BNP and EDL, and the anti-Muslim campaigns of the BNP have been condemned by all leading Sikh organizations. However, it has been reported that some extremists from the Sikh community have aligned themselves with the BNP. It has also been noted that some Sikhs adopted prevalent racial prejudices in the West, leading to a variant of Islamophobia within the Sikh community that mirrors broader Islamophobic discourse.

In 2018, Sikh Youth UK's report claimed similarities between the exploitation of young Sikh women and the Rotherham scandal. However, a 2019 critique from two Sikh academics and a UK government report found the allegations to be false and misleading, lacking solid data and promoting historical tensions "designed to whip up fear and hate". Research by Katy Sian of the University of York further debunked these claims, attributing them to extremist Sikh groups.

During the 2024 United Kingdom riots, the Sikh community, along with the Hindu and Jewish communities, released statements condemning the Islamophobic rioting.

== Notable British Muslim figures ==
=== Business and finance ===
- Sir Anwar Pervez – businessman; founder and chairman of Bestway Group
- Mohsin Issa – businessman; co-founder of EG Group
- Zuber Issa – businessman; co-founder of EG Group
- Mahmud Kamani – businessman; co-founder and executive vice-chair of Boohoo Group
- Umar Kamani – businessman; co-founder of PrettyLittleThing
- Asif Aziz – property developer; founder of Criterion Capital
- Aneel Mussarat – property developer; founder of MCR Property Group
- Sultan Choudhury – Islamic finance executive; former chief executive of Al Rayan Bank
- Lord Gulam Noon – businessman and philanthropist; founder of Noon Products, which helped popularise Indian ready meals in Britain.
- Lord Waheed Alli – media entrepreneur, investor and life peer; co-founder of Planet 24 television production company.
- Mohammed Amin – former PricewaterhouseCoopers partner and UK head of Islamic finance; the first Muslim partner at Price Waterhouse in Britain.

=== Media and entertainment ===
- Yusuf Islam (Cat Stevens) – musician and singer-songwriter
- Riz Ahmed – actor and musician
- Mishal Husain – journalist and broadcaster
- Fatima Manji – journalist and news presenter
- Mehdi Hasan – journalist and political commentator
- Nadiya Hussain – television presenter and author
- Adil Ray – comedian, actor and broadcaster
- Guz Khan – comedian and actor
- Asim Chaudhry – comedian, writer and actor
- Adeel Akhtar – actor
- Central Cee – rapper
- Shazia Mirza – stand-up comedian, writer and broadcaster.
- Naughty Boy (Shahid Khan) – record producer, songwriter and musician; has worked with Beyoncé, Sam Smith and Rihanna.

=== Politics and public life ===
- Sadiq Khan – Mayor of London
- Humza Yousaf – former First Minister of Scotland
- Sayeeda Warsi – former Cabinet minister and life peer
- Anas Sarwar – Leader of the Scottish Labour Party
- Shabana Mahmood – Home Secretary and Member of Parliament for Birmingham Ladywood
- Nusrat Ghani – Member of Parliament and former minister
- Mothin Ali – co-deputy leader of the Green Party of England and Wales and Leeds City Councillor
- Shaista Gohir – crossbench peer and women's rights advocate
- Mohammad Sarwar – former Labour MP; became Britain's first Muslim Member of Parliament in 1997.
- Sir Sajid Javid – former Chancellor of the Exchequer, Home Secretary and Health Secretary; publicly identifies as Muslim but does not practise a religion.
- Rushanara Ali – Labour MP and former minister; the first British-Bangladeshi Member of Parliament and one of the first three Muslim women elected to the House of Commons.
- Zarah Sultana – Member of Parliament for Coventry South and political campaigner.
- Baroness Uddin – life peer and community activist; the first Muslim woman appointed to the House of Lords, in 1998.

=== Science, medicine and healthcare ===
- Mumtaz Patel – consultant nephrologist and president of the Royal College of Physicians; the first Muslim elected to lead the institution, in 2025.
- Farah Bhatti – cardiothoracic surgeon and president of the British Medical Association for 2026–27; the first Muslim woman elected to the Council of the Royal College of Surgeons of England.

=== Law and judiciary ===
- Sir Akhlaq Choudhury – High Court judge; the first British-Bangladeshi Muslim appointed to the High Court of Justice of England and Wales, in 2017.
- Nazir Afzal – former Chief Crown Prosecutor for North West England and Chancellor of the University of Manchester.

=== Sports ===
- Mo Farah – long-distance runner and four-time Olympic gold medallist
- Moeen Ali – England international cricketer
- Adil Rashid – England international cricketer
- Amir Khan – professional boxer and former world champion
- Naseem Hamed – former world champion boxer
- Hamzah Sheeraz – professional boxer
- Adam Azim – professional boxer
- Ramla Ali – Somali-British professional boxer and Olympian
- Hamza Choudhury – professional footballer
- Zesh Rehman – former professional footballer
- Djed Spence – professional footballer and England international
- Rehan Ahmed – England international cricketer; became England's youngest male Test cricketer in 2022.
- Shoaib Bashir – England international cricketer and Test spin bowler.

=== Religion and religious leadership ===
- Abdal Hakim Murad (Timothy Winter) – Islamic scholar and Dean of Cambridge Muslim College
- Ibrahim Mogra – imam and interfaith activist
- Ajmal Masroor – imam and broadcaster
- Haitham al-Haddad – imam and Islamic speaker
- Riyadh ul Haq – Islamic scholar
- Abdul Qayum – former Chief Imam of East London Mosque

=== Academia and scholarship ===
- Maleiha Malik – legal academic specialising in law, religion and equality
- Tariq Modood – sociologist known for his research on multiculturalism, ethnicity and religion
- Salman Sayyid – political theorist and academic specialising in Islam, postcolonialism and political identity
- Mona Siddiqui – professor of religion and society at King's College London, Islamic studies scholar and broadcaster.

=== Philanthropy and community leadership ===
- Muhammad Abdul Bari – community leader and former Secretary General of the Muslim Council of Britain
- Zara Mohammed – former Secretary General of the Muslim Council of Britain (2021–2025); the first woman to lead the organisation.
- Iqbal Sacranie – businessman and community leader; former Secretary General of the Muslim Council of Britain
- Hany El Banna – humanitarian and founder of Islamic Relief Worldwide

== Notable mosques ==
The following are among the most well-known and architecturally or historically notable mosques in the United Kingdom:

- Bradford Grand Mosque – Large purpose-built mosque in West Yorkshire.
- Birmingham Central Mosque – Major mosque and Islamic centre in Birmingham.
- East London Mosque – Prominent mosque complex in Whitechapel, London.
- London Central Mosque – Landmark mosque in Regent's Park, London.
- Central Jamia Mosque Ghamkol Sharif – Purpose-built mosque in Birmingham.
- Markazi Masjid, Dewsbury – European centre of the Tablighi Jamaat.
- Shah Jahan Mosque, Woking – The first purpose-built mosque in Britain.
- Cambridge Central Mosque – Eco-designed mosque and Cambridge's first purpose-built mosque.
- Masjid-e-Vali, Blackburn – Large recently developed mosque in Lancashire.
- South Lakes Islamic Centre, Cumbria – Notable mosque serving the Lake District region.
- Green Lane Masjid – Large mosque and community centre in Birmingham.
- Glasgow Central Mosque – Prominent mosque and Islamic centre in Scotland.
- Leeds Grand Mosque – Major mosque serving Leeds and West Yorkshire.
- Finsbury Park Mosque – Well-known mosque in North London.
- Al-Rahma Mosque (Liverpool) – Large mosque and community complex in Liverpool.
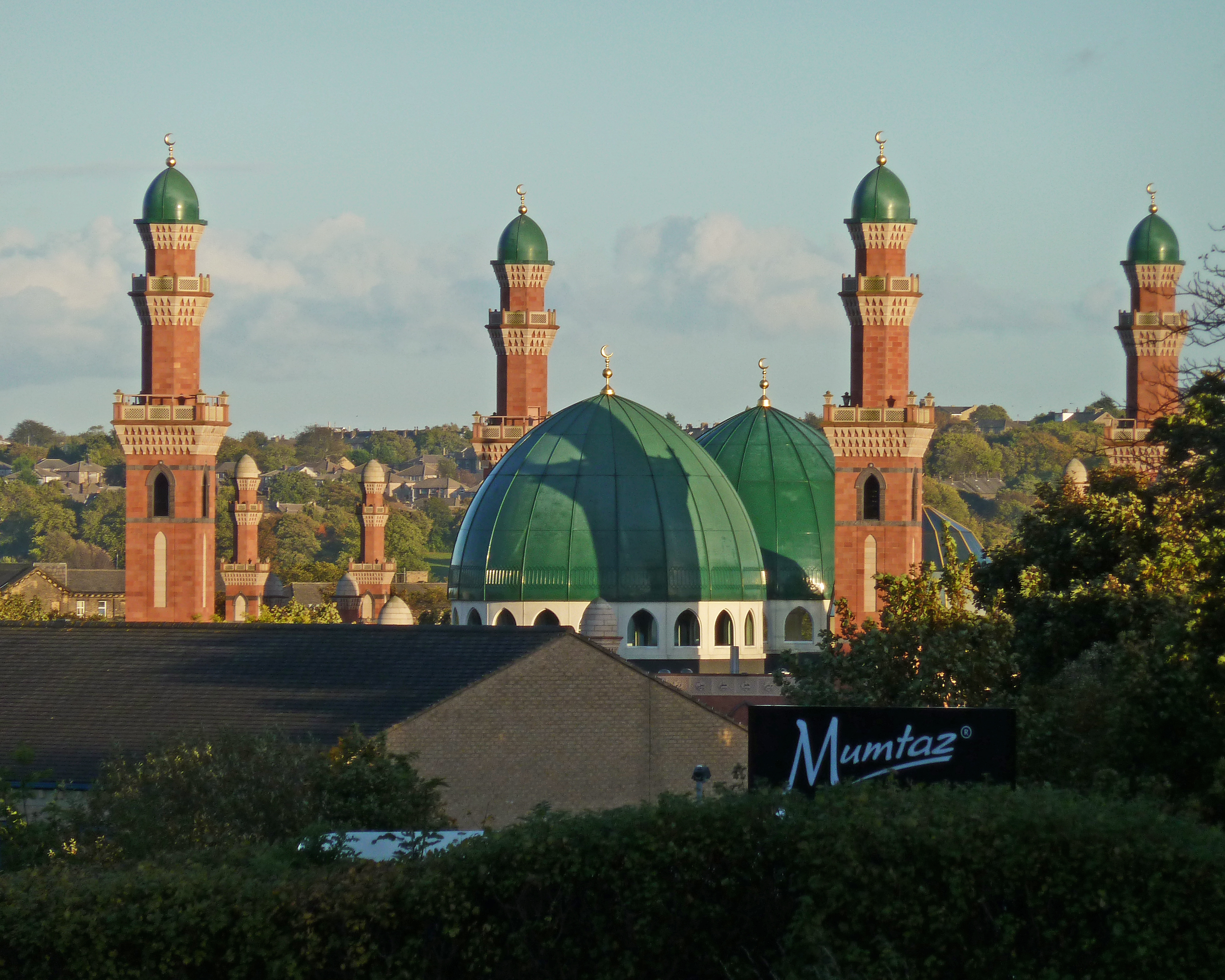
Bradford Grand Mosque

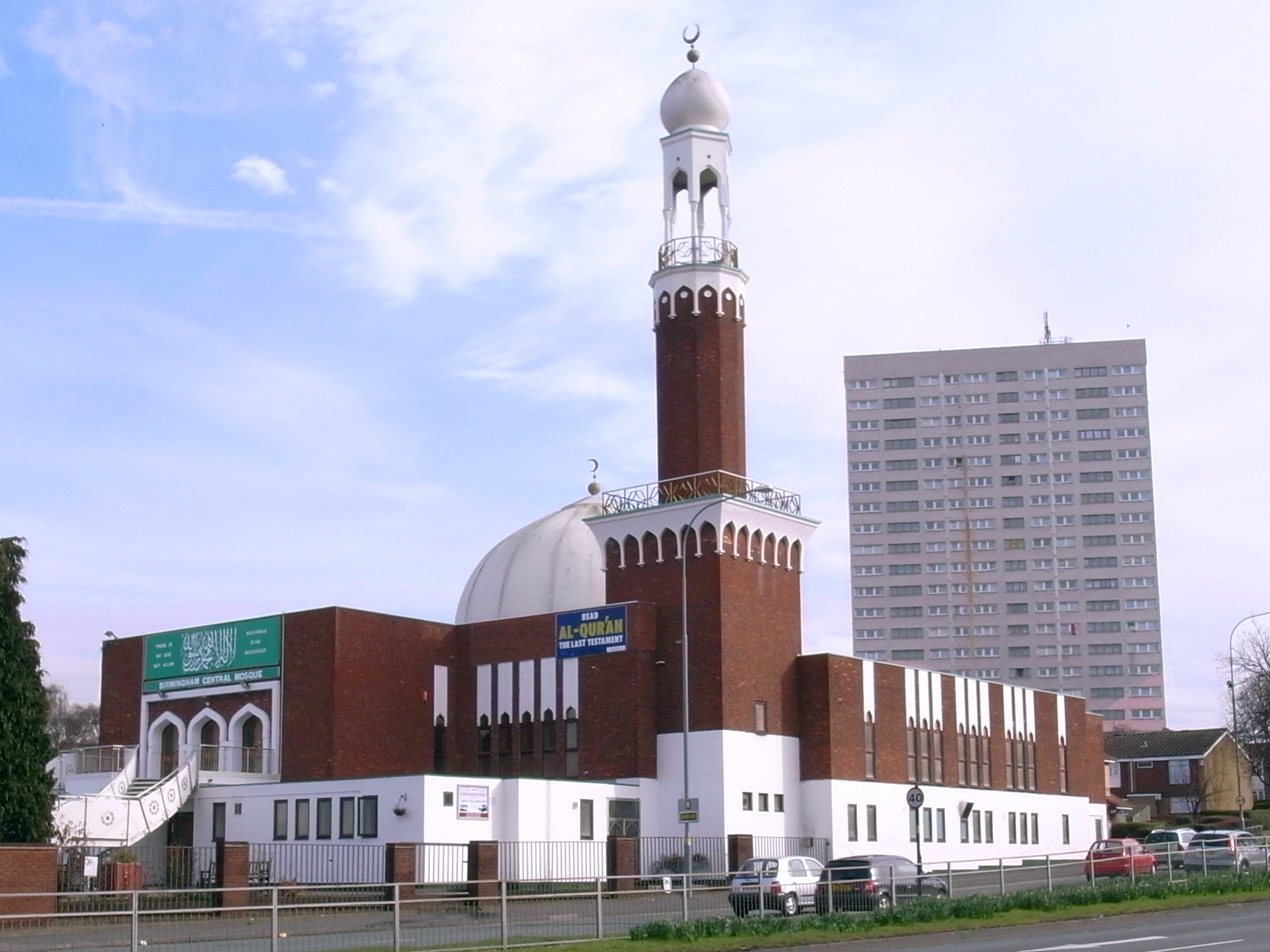
Birmingham Central Mosque

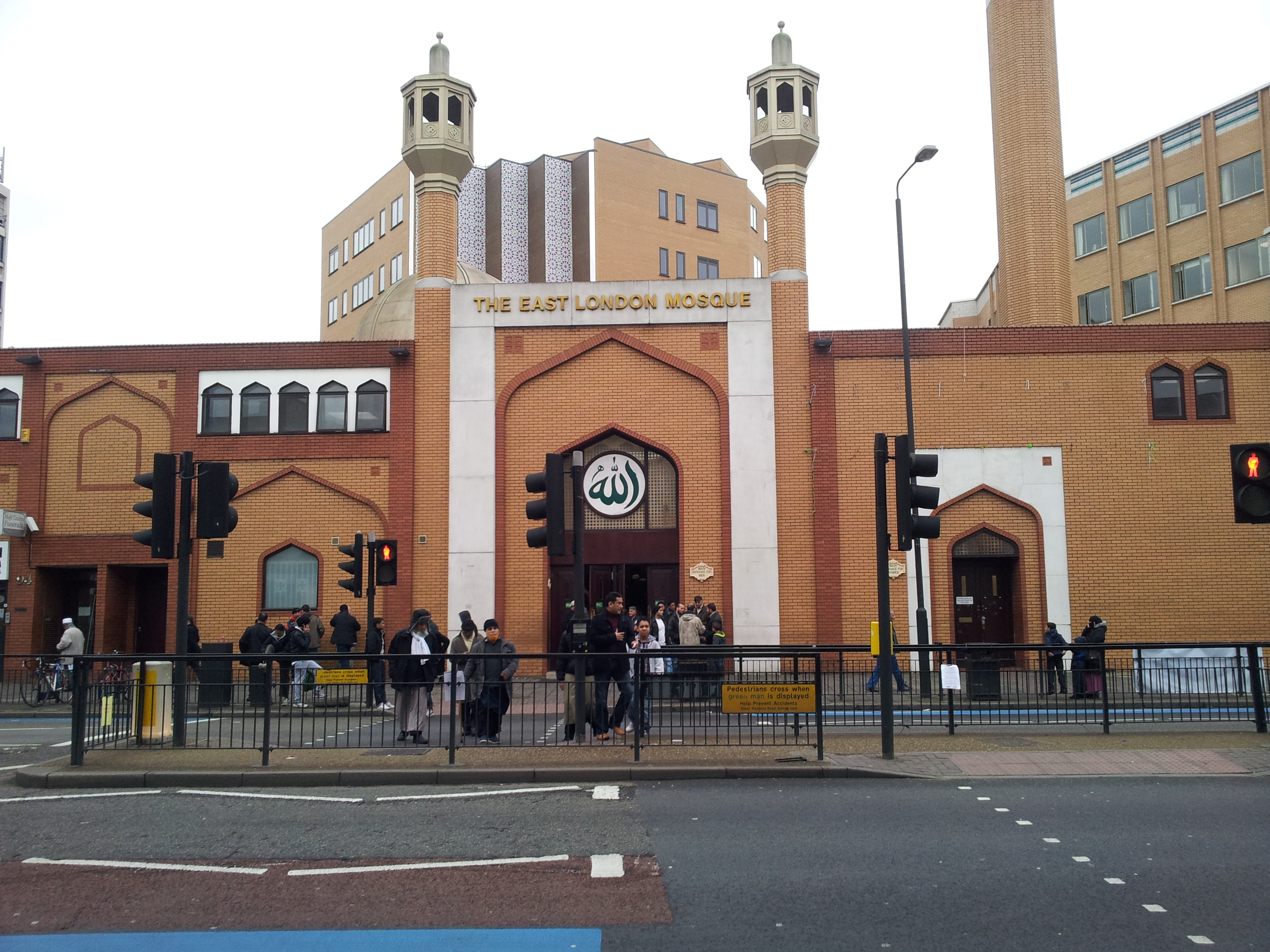
East London Mosque

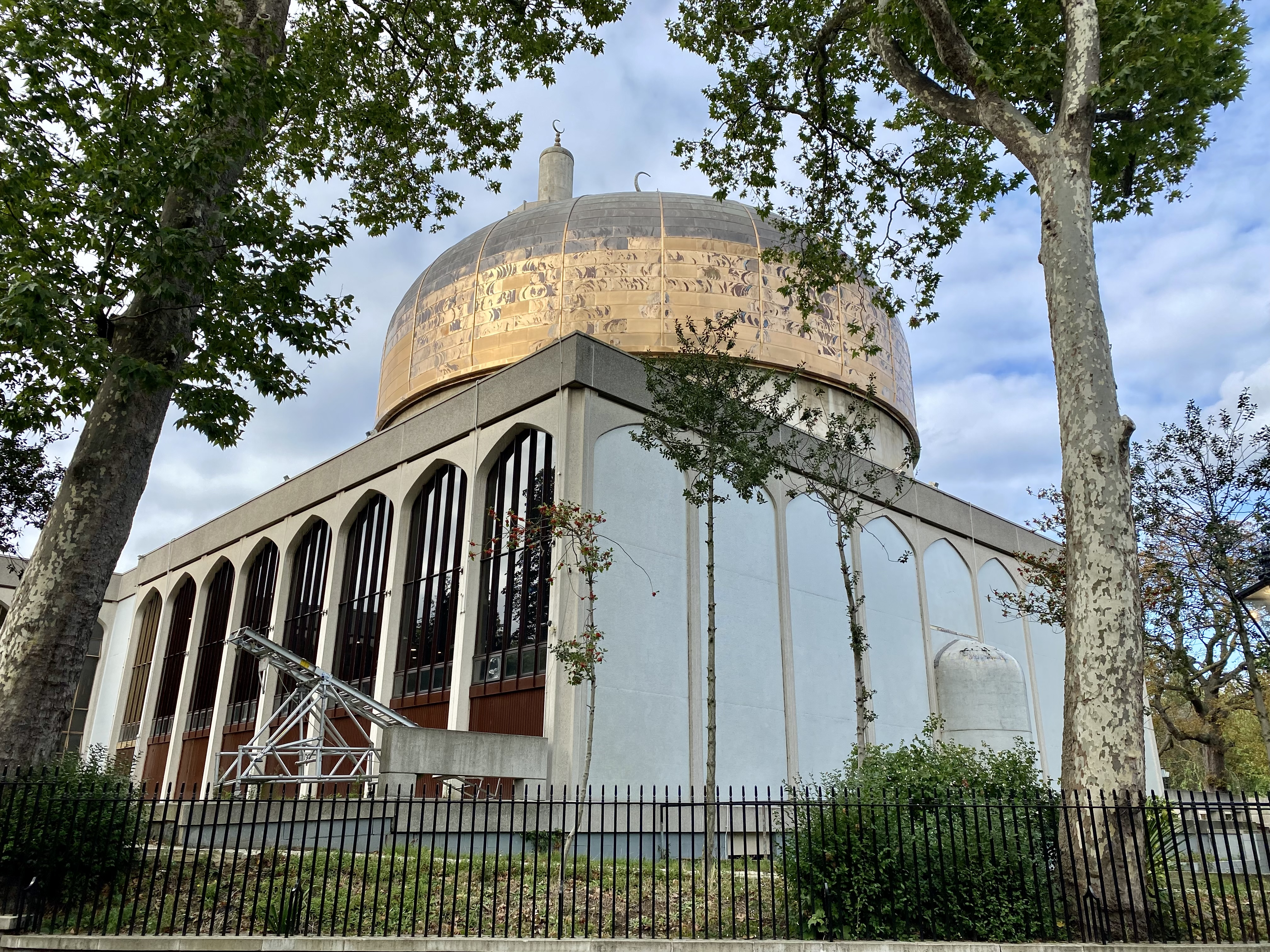
London Central Mosque

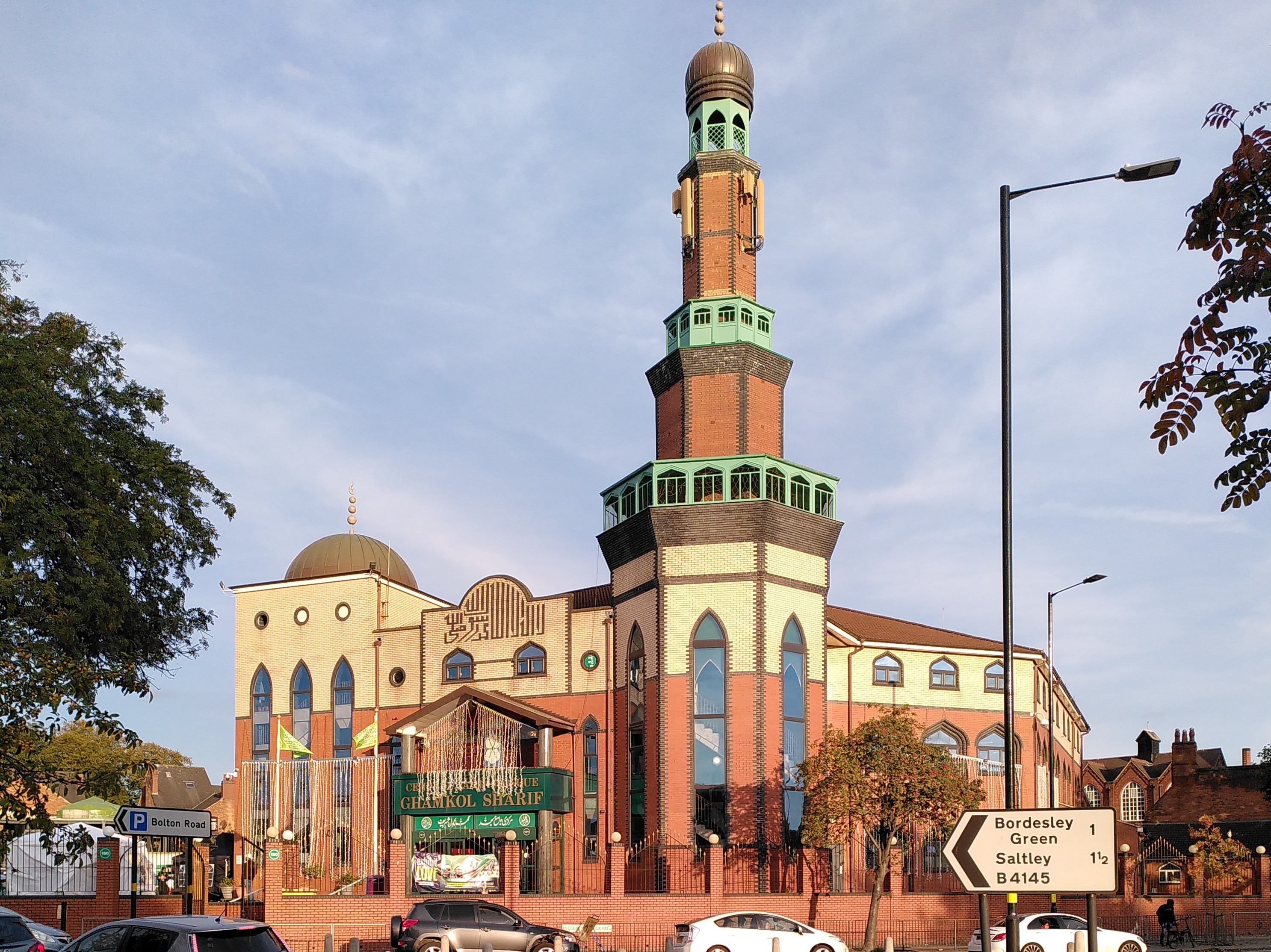
Ghamkol Sharif Mosque

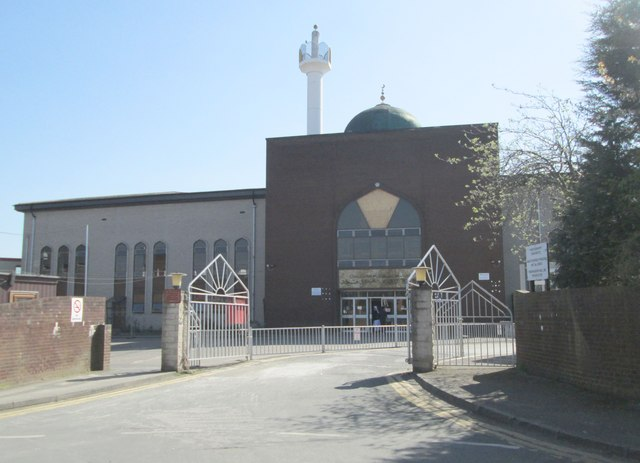
Markazi Masjid, Dewsbury

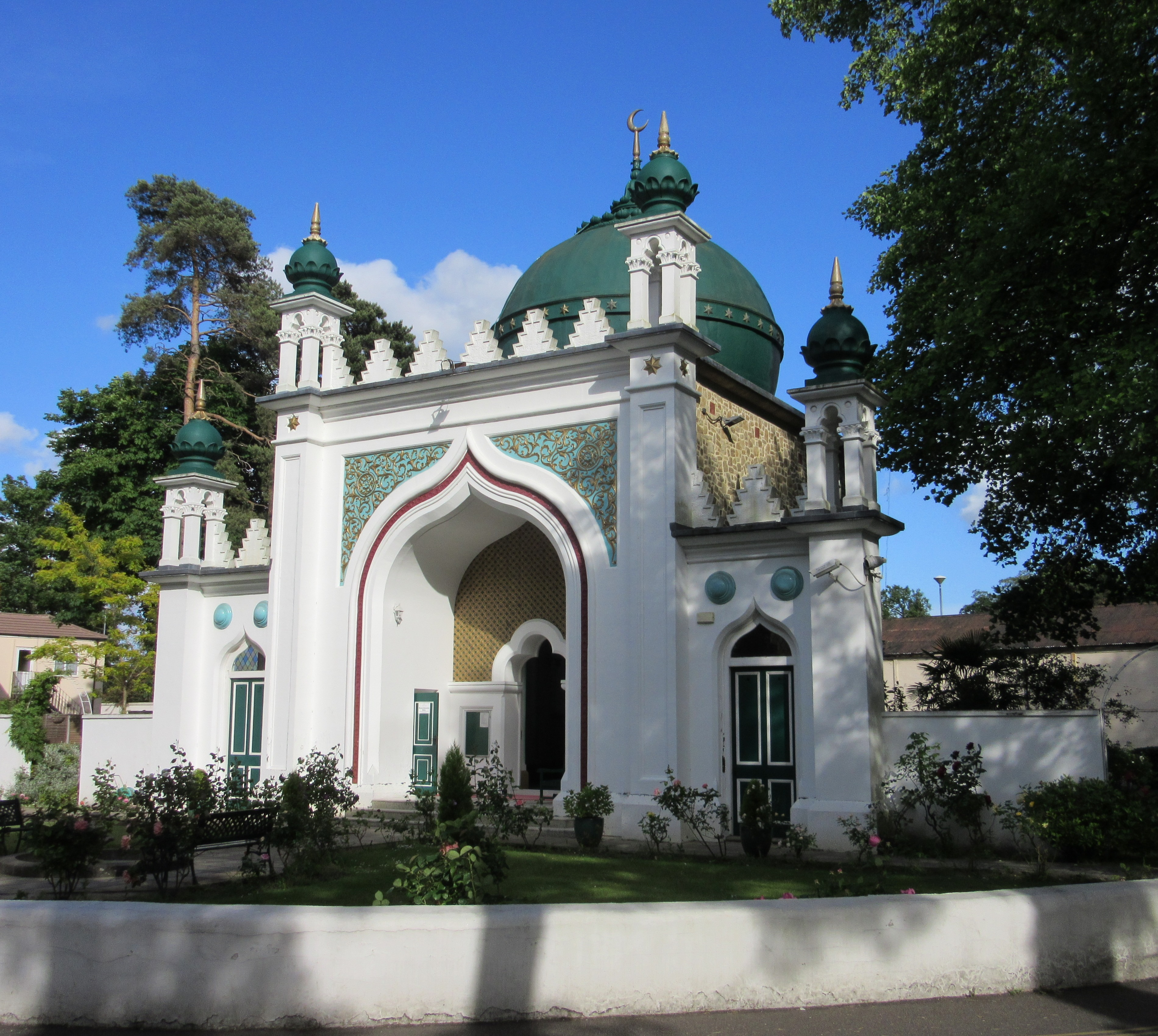
Shah Jahan Mosque, Woking

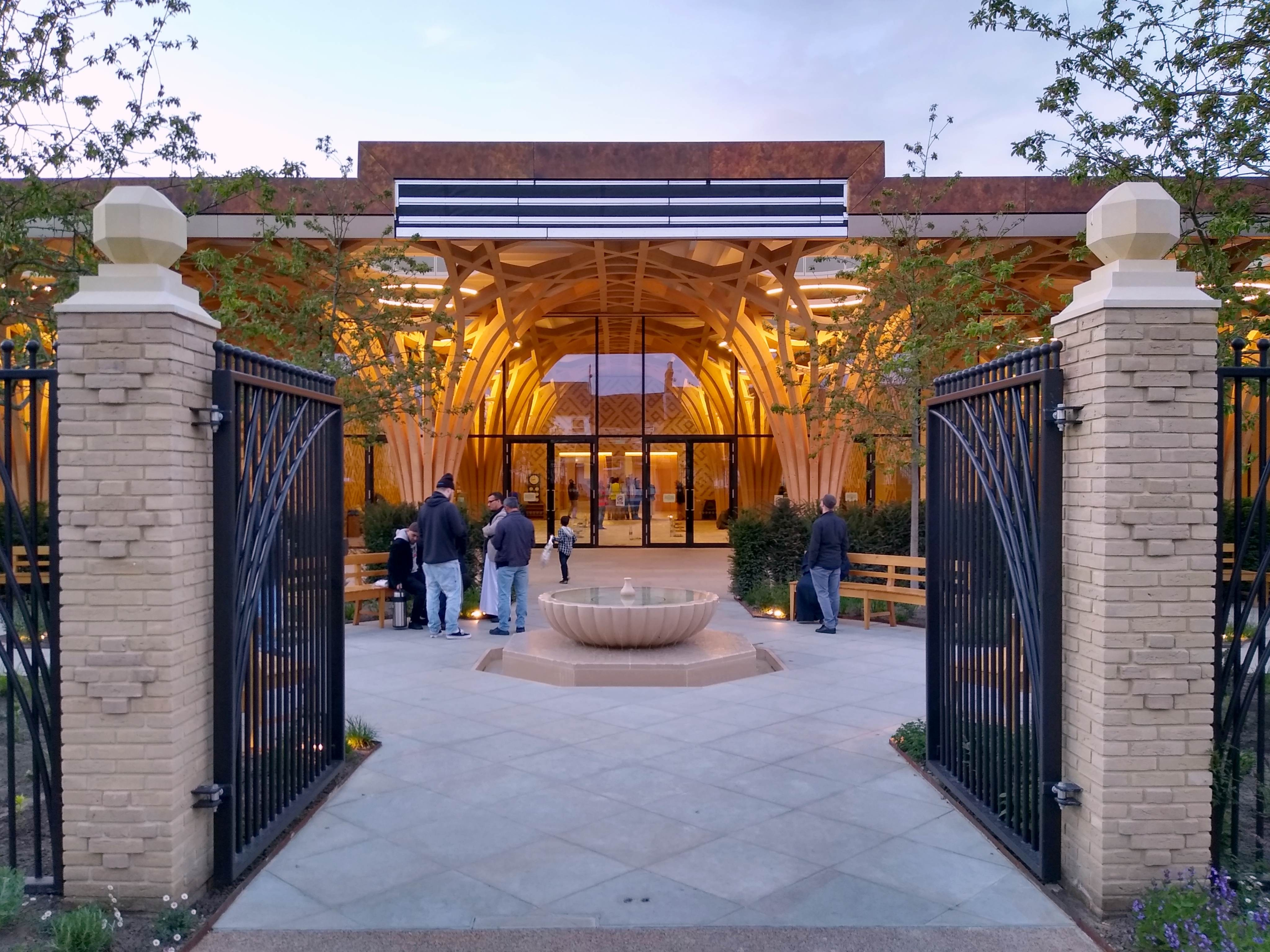
Cambridge Central Mosque

== See also ==
- The Muslim Vote
- Islam in England
- Islam in London
- Islam in Birmingham
- Islam in Northern Ireland
- Islam in Scotland
- Islam in Wales
- Islam in the Republic of Ireland
- Islam in Europe
- Islam in France
- List of British Muslims
- Muslims in Western Europe
- Religion in Europe
- Religion in the United Kingdom

== Sources ==
- Cassia, Paul Sant (2007), Bodies of Evidence: Burial, Memory, and the Recovery of Missing Persons in Cyprus, Berghahn Books, ISBN 978-1-84545-228-5
- Communities and Local Government (2009a), The Turkish and Turkish Cypriot Muslim Community in England: Understanding Muslim Ethnic Communities (PDF), Communities and Local Government, ISBN 978-1-4098-1267-8, archived from the original (PDF) on 12 October 2010
- Sonyel, Salahi R. (2000), "Turkish Migrants in Europe" (PDF), Perceptions, 5 (Sept.–Nov. 00), Center for Strategic Research: 146–153, archived from the original (PDF) on 10 March 2013
