= Turks in London =

Ethnic group in London

- Map of London illustrating the main settlement of the Turkish community.

Total population
- est. 600,000 (2019 estimate) including 400,000 Turkish Cypriots and 200,000 Turks

Regions with significant populations
- London Borough of Enfield; London Borough of Hackney; London Borough of Haringey; London Borough of Islington; London Borough of Waltham Forest

Languages
- British English; Turkish (including the Cypriot Turkish dialect)

Religion
- Sunni Islam; Alevism; other religions; irreligious

Turks in London (Turkish: Londra'daki Türkler) or London Turks (Turkish: Londralı Türkler) refers to Turkish people who live in London, the capital city of the United Kingdom. The Turkish community in the United Kingdom is not evenly distributed across the country. As a result, the concentration of the Turks is almost all in Greater London. Turkish neighbourhoods are largely in North London, however there are also Turkish communities in North East London and Central London.

== History ==
Turks first began to land on English shores during the seventeenth century when they had been freed from galley slavery on Spanish ships by English pirates. Queen Elizabeth I wanted to cultivate good relations with the Ottomans, as well as trying to resist the Spanish. Therefore, the release of the galley slaves was an instrument of diplomacy. This resulted in Murad III helping to divide the naval force intended for the Spanish Armada. The Spanish armada was ultimately defeated, potentially in part due to this lack of support.

In 1627 there were nearly 40 Muslims living in London. Although their precise origins cannot be distinguished, it was the Turkish Muslim culture which made a dramatic impression on English society during the seventeenth century with the introduction of coffee houses. The Turks in London worked as tailors, shoemakers, button makers and even solicitors. By the early 1650s, an English merchant who had been trading in the Ottoman Levant returned to London with a Turkish servant who introduced the making of Turkish coffee. By 1652 the first coffee house had opened in London and within a decade more than 80 establishments flourished in the city.

In regards to modern migration, Turkish Cypriots began to migrate to London when Cyprus became a British Colony in 1878. Cypriots who arrived during this period were mainly from rural parts of Cyprus. However, it was during the early 1950s and early 1960s, when the Greek Cypriot nationalist military resistance organisation EOKA was fighting to unite the island of Cyprus with Greece (also referred to as Enosis), that immigration began to significantly increase due to the hostilities on the island. The inter-communal fighting and subsequent population exchanges culminated in the division of the island which was another significant reason for large numbers of Cypriot immigration. Many of the early immigrants, both men and women, worked in the clothing industry on arrival to London. It was estimated in 1979 that 60% of Cypriot women (both Turkish and Greek) worked in this industry, many of them doing piecework at home as well as working in factories.

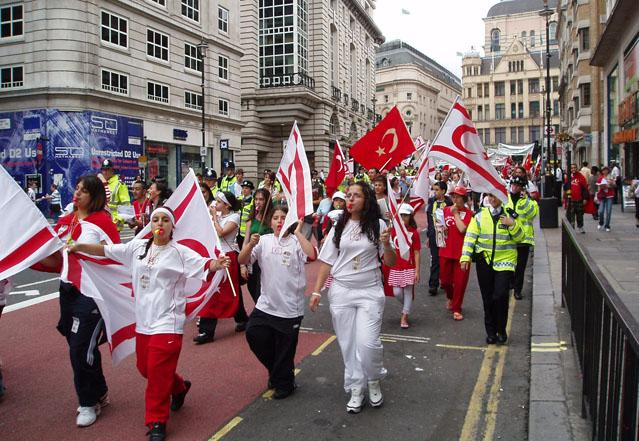
Turks and Turkish Cypriots protesting in central London

By the 1970s Turkish Cypriots started to come to London as refugees because of the ongoing war on the island. In July 1974, a coup supported by the then ruling Greek military junta of Greece deposed the Cypriot government and installed its own regime on the island, with Nikos Sampson as the de facto president, before declaring the Hellenic Republic of Cyprus. This eventually led to the Turkish invasion of Cyprus. In 1983, the Turkish Cypriot-held area declared itself the Turkish Republic of Northern Cyprus, with only the support of Turkey. By the 1990s, Turkish Cypriot migration was increasingly motivated by economic hardship due to the embargoes imposed upon Northern Cyprus and a lack of international aid or support. Finally the post 2004 migration was the result of the Republic of Cyprus' EU accession when thousands of Turkish Cypriots decided to apply for Cypriot nationality.

== Demographics ==
Almost 90% of Turks in the United Kingdom live in London. The Turkish community is visible in certain areas of North and East London such as Tottenham, Haggerston, Edmonton, Wood Green, Hoxton and Palmers Green. In South London, they live in Elephant and Castle, Lewisham, Southwark, Peckham and Abbey Wood. Smaller settlements include the city of Westminster and Kensington and Chelsea. The spatially concentrated community is due to the Turkish community preferring to live with Turkish neighbours which has now created notable Turkish enclaves in particular areas of London.

As of 2019, approximately 600,000 people of Turkish origin are living in London, including 400,000 Turkish Cypriots
and 200,000 Turks.

There are also growing ethnic Turkish communities which have come to London from other post-Ottoman modern nation-states, especially from the Balkans (i.e. Bulgarian Turks, Western Thracian Turks, Romanian Turks etc.) and the Levant (i.e. Iraqi Turks, Lebanese Turks, Syrian Turks).

In 2008, approximately 600-700 Western Thrace Turks from Greece were living in London. This does not include those who are British-born or who have been naturalised.

== Culture ==
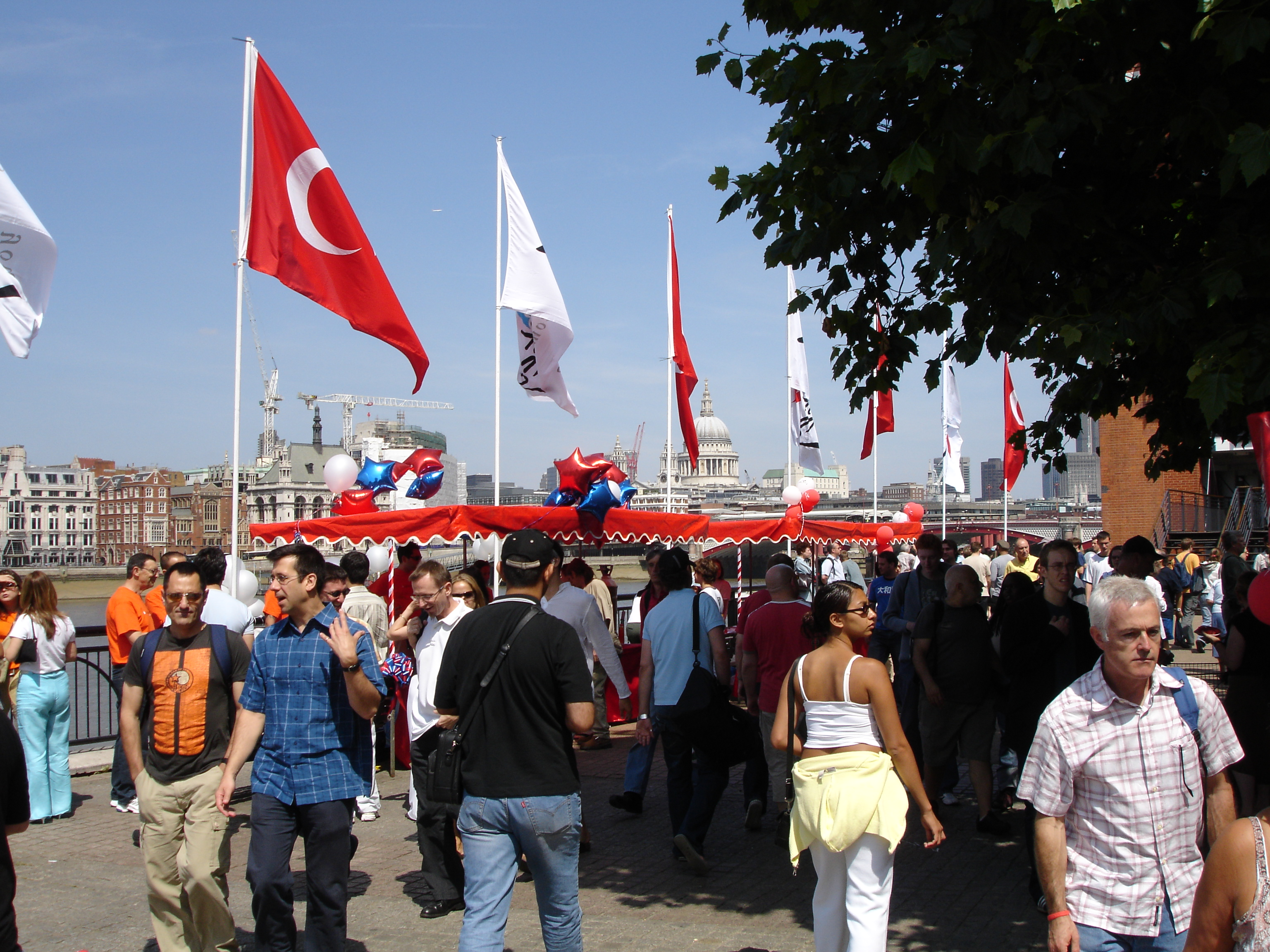
A Turkish festival on the South Bank

=== Language ===
The Turkish language is the most common language spoken among the "Other White" ethnic group in London. Turkish children born in London are usually English dominant. Nonetheless, the Turkish language is taught within the home and through formal Turkish schools. The Turkish language is used in the curriculum of several London public primary schools to help children whose English is poor. At secondary schools it is also offered as a formal examination subject.

=== Turkish supplementary schools ===
The oldest Turkish complementary or supplementary schools, which pupils can attend in addition to receiving regular schooling, were established by the Cyprus Turkish Association, which organised Turkish language classes as early as 1959. In the early 1980s, these schools gained much more popularity amongst the community. These supplementary schools are independent schools and are administered by Turkish associations in the UK, and the Ministries of Education in Turkey and Northern Cyprus. Turkish schools have been set up in many of the London boroughs with the explicit aim to provide the Turkish language and culture to the British-born Turkish community. There are about 25 Turkish schools around London, currently teaching around 3,000 children. Most of these schools do not have their own premises and instead hire space at mainstream schools or colleges. The majority of these schools encourage and prepare students for exams such as GCSE and A-Level qualifications in Turkish. Turkish schools also focus on maintaining the Turkish culture by providing classes in Turkish music, Turkish Cypriot folk dancing, and sports clubs (mainly football clubs). In 2000, an umbrella organisation called the Turkish Language Education and Culture Consortium was established bringing together 18 Turkish schools in the Greater London area.

=== Religion ===
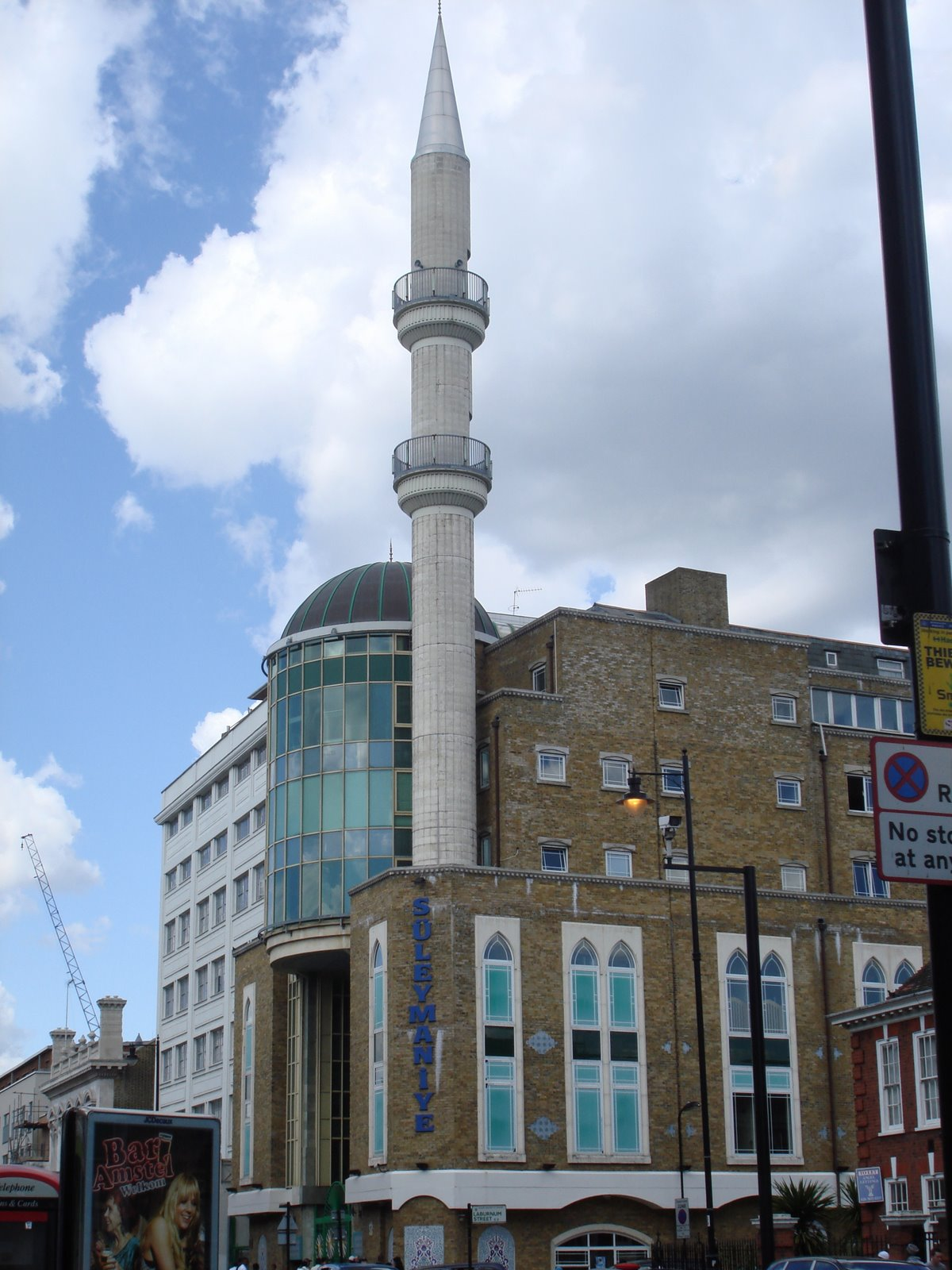
The Suleymaniye Mosque in Haggerston.

The Turkish Cypriot community were one of the first Muslim communities to be established in London, even before South Asian Muslims. During the 1950s, a single converted Victorian terrace house was used as a mosque by the community. The Cyprus Turkish Association ignored religion in its activities as it was viewed as an obstacle to adjusting and integrating in a multicultural environment. Although only a minority of Turkish Cypriots had any interest in religion, Islamic values were still deeply rooted in the majority of the community's identity. Once the community was firmly settled in London, Turks became aware that although they had maintained their ethnic identity there was a lack of attention to its religious dimension. This resulted in the foundation of the United Kingdom Turkish Islamic Association (UKTIA) Shacklewell Lane Mosque

In 1977 the first Turkish mosque, Shacklewell Lane Mosque, was opened by the Turkish Cypriot business man and politician Ramadan Güney. By 1983 the first Turkish mosque complex, the Azizye Mosque, was established. Turks who had once felt reluctant to attend a ‘non-Turkish’ mosque welcomed the congregation as services were provided in the Turkish language rather than in English or Arabic.

Alongside Sunni Islam worship, a large Alevi diaspora is found among Turkish immigrants in London. Also making up a large proportion of the native population living in Turkey, Alevis worship in cemevi. Cemevi serves as both a place of worship as well as a community space, often distributing food and hosting celebrations throughout the year.

Other Turkish places of worship includes Aziziye Mosque and Validesultan Mosque in Stoke Newington;Madina Mosque and Suleymaniye Mosque in Hackney; Fatih Mosque in Wood Green; Sultan Selim Mosque in Seven Sisters; and the Edmonton Islamic Centre in Upper Edmonton.

== Businesses ==
Due to the collapse of the textile industry in London, the majority of the Turkish community decided to pursue self-employment. Restaurants, kebab shops, cafes, supermarkets, minicab offices, off licenses and various other trades have now taken over from the textile trade. There are clearly identifiable areas in which these business premises are based; mainly N16, N17, and E8.

== Media ==
There are a number of media associations in London for the Turkish community, including the newspapers Avrupa Gazete, Londra Gazete, Olay and TV stations such as Euro Genc TV and many other cultural associations and websites.

== See also ==
- Turks in the United Kingdom
- London Turkish Radio
- 16th London Turkish Film Festival
- Islam in London
- Turks in Berlin
