= Minorities in Turkey =

Ethnic groups in Turkey (The World Factbook, 2016 estimations)
Ethnic groups	Percent
Turks	70–75%
Kurds	19%
Others (Note: Crimean Tatars, Circassians, Arabs, Greeks, Armenians, Assyrians, Turkish Jews, etc.)	6–11%

Minorities in Turkey form a substantial part of the country's population, representing an estimated 25 to 28 percent of the population. Historically, in the Ottoman Empire, Islam was the official and dominant religion, with Muslims having more rights than non-Muslims, whose rights were restricted. Non-Muslim (dhimmi) ethno-religious groups were legally identified by different millet ("nations").

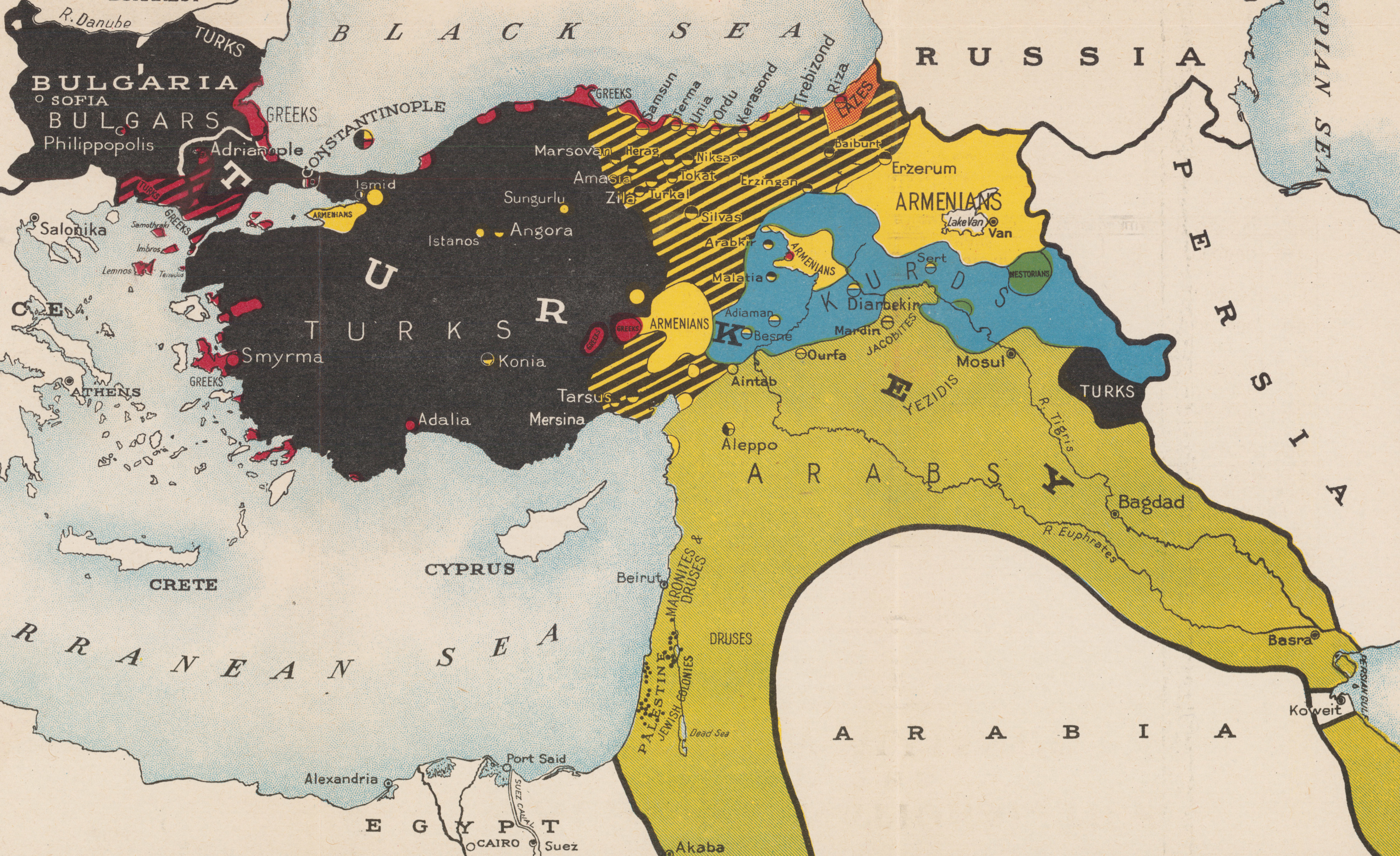
Ethnic groups of Turkish Empire and Bulgarian Tsardom in 1917

Following the end of World War I and the dissolution of the Ottoman Empire, all Ottoman Muslims were made part of the modern citizenry or the Turkish nation as the newly founded Republic of Turkey was constituted as a Muslim nation state. While Turkish nationalist policy viewed all Muslims in Turkey as Turks without exception, non-Muslim minority groups, such as Jews and Christians, were designated as "foreign nations" (dhimmi). Conversely, Turk (term for Muslims) was used to denote all groups in the region who had been Islamized under Ottoman rule, especially Muslim Albanians and Slavic Muslims.

The 1923 Treaty of Lausanne specified Armenians, Greeks and Jews and Christians in general as ethnic minorities (dhimmi). This legal status was not granted to Muslim minorities, such as the Kurds, which constituted the largest minority by a wide margin, nor any of the other minorities in the country. In modern Turkey, data on the ethnic makeup of the country is not officially collected, although various estimates exist. All Muslim citizens are still regarded as Turks by law, regardless of their ethnicity or language, in contrast to non-Muslim minorities, who are still grouped as "non-Turks"; the largest ethnic minority, the Kurds, who are predominantly Muslim, are therefore still classified as simply "Turks". Bulgarians are also an officially recognized minority by the Turkey-Bulgaria Friendship Treaty (Türkiye ve Bulgaristan Arasındaki Dostluk Antlaşması) of 18 October 1925 but in the present day there are only a few hundred Bulgarians in Turkey. On 18 June 2013, the Ankara 13th Circuit Administrative Court unanimously ruled that the Assyrians were included as beneficiaries of the Lausanne Treaty, (Note: Ankara 13th Circuit Administrative Court, 18 June 2013 (E. 2012/1746, K. 2013/952).) so that Assyrians were allowed to open the first school teaching in their mother tongue.

The amount of ethnic minorities is considered to be underestimated by the Turkish government. Therefore, the exact number of members of ethnic groups who are Muslim is unknown; these include Arabs, Albanians, Bosniaks, Circassians, Georgians, Chechens, Abkhazians, Crimean Tatars, Laz, Hemshin Armenians, Kurds, Pomaks, Turkish Roma, and Pontic Greeks, among other smaller groups like Dom, Lom, Vallahades, Greek Muslims, Cretan Muslims, Nantinets. Many of the non-Turkish Muslim minorities are descendants of Muslims (muhajirs) who were expelled from the lands lost by the shrinking Ottoman Empire, like the Balkans and Caucasus Mountains. The majority have assimilated into and intermarried with the majority Turkish population and have adopted the Turkish language and way of life, though do not necessarily identify as Turks, especially the Pomaks. Turkification and often aggressive Turkish nationalist policies strengthen these trends.

== Tables ==
Distribution of nationalities in Anatolia
Ottoman official statistics, 1910
Sanjak	Turks	Greeks	Armenians	Jews	Others	Total
Istanbul (Asiatic shore)	135,681	70,906	30,465	5,120	16,812	258,984
İzmit	184,960	78,564	50,935	2,180	1,435	318,074
Aydin (İzmir)	974,225	629,002	17,247	24,361	58,076	1,702,911
Bursa	1,346,387	274,530	87,932	2,788	6,125	1,717,762
Konya	1,143,335	85,320	9,426	720	15,356	1,254,157
Ankara	991,666	54,280	101,388	901	12,329	1,160,564
Trabzon	1,047,889	351,104	45,094	-	-	1,444,087
Sivas	933,572	98,270	165,741	-	-	1,197,583
Kastamonu	1,086,420	18,160	3,061	-	1,980	1,109,621
Adana	212,454	88,010	81,250	–	107,240	488,954
Canakkale	136,000	29,000	2,000	3,300	98	170,398
Total	8,192,589	1,777,146	594,539	39,370	219,451	10,823,095
Percentage	75.7%	16.42%	5.50%	0.36%	2.03%	
Ecumenical Patriarchate statistics, 1912
Total	7,048,662	1,788,582	608,707	37,523	218,102	9,695,506
Percentage	72.7%	18.45%	6.28%	0.39%	2.25%	

Distribution of nationalities in East Thrace
Ottoman official statistics, 1910
Sanjak	Turks	Greeks	Bulgarians	Others	Total
Edirne	128,000	113,500	31,500	14,700	287,700
Kirk Kilisse	53,000	77,000	28,500	1,150	159,650
Tekirdağ	63,500	56,000	3,000	21,800	144,300
Gallipoli	31,500	70,500	2,000	3,200	107,200
Çatalca	18,000	48,500	–	2,340	68,840
Istanbul	450,000	260,000	6,000	130,000	846,000
Total	744,000	625,500	71,000	173,190	1,613,690
Percentage	46.11%	38.76%	4.40%	10.74%	
Ecumenical Patriarchate statistics, 1912
Total	604,500	655,600	71,800	337,600	1,669,500
Percentage	36.20%	39.27%	4.30%	20.22%	

Muslim and non-Muslim population in Turkey, 1914–2005 (in thousands)
Year	1914	1927	1945	1965	1990	2005
Muslims	12,941	13,290	18,511	31,139	56,860	71,997
Greeks	1,549	110	104	76	8	3
Armenians	1,204	77	60	64	67	50
Jews	128	82	77	38	29	27
Others	176	71	38	74	50	45
Total	15,997	13,630	18,790	31,391	57,005	72,120
Percentage non-Muslim	19.1	2.5	1.5	0.8	0.3	0.2

== Ethnic minorities ==
=== Abdal ===
Groups of nomadic and semi-nomadic itinerants found mainly in central and western Anatolia. They speak an argot of their own and are Alevis.

=== Afghans ===
Afghans are one of the largest irregular migrant groups in Turkey. From the period 2003–2007, the number of Afghans apprehended were significant, with statistics almost doubling during the last year. Most had fled the War in Afghanistan. In 2005, refugees from Afghanistan numbered 300 and made a sizeable proportion of Turkey's registered migrants. Most of them were spread out over satellite cities with Van and Ağrı being the most specific locations. In the following years, the number of Afghans entering Turkey greatly increased, second only to migrants from Iraq; in 2009, there were 16,000 people designated under the Iraq-Afghanistan category. Despite a dramatic 50 percent reduction by 2010, reports confirmed hundreds living and working in Turkey. As of January 2010, Afghans consisted one-sixth of the 26,000 remaining refugees and asylum seekers. By the end 2011, their numbers are expected to surge up to 10,000, making them the largest population and surpass other groups.

=== Africans ===
Beginning several centuries ago, a number of Africans, usually via Zanzibar as Zanj and from places such as Niger, Saudi Arabia, Libya, Kenya and Sudan, came to the Ottoman Empire settled by the Dalaman, Menderes and Gediz valleys, Manavgat, and Çukurova. African quarters of 19th-century İzmir, including Sabırtaşı, Dolapkuyu, Tamaşalık, İkiçeşmelik, and Ballıkuyu, are mentioned in contemporary records. Due to the slave trade in the Ottoman Empire that had flourished in the Balkans, the coastal town of Ulcinj in Montenegro had its own black community. As a consequence of the slave trade and privateer activity, it is told how until 1878 in Ulcinj 100 black people lived. The Ottoman Army also deployed an estimated 30,000 Black African troops and cavalrymen to its expedition in Hungary during the Austro-Turkish War of 1716–18.

=== Albanians ===
A 2008 report from the Turkish National Security Council (MGK) estimated that approximately 1.3 million people of Albanian ancestry live in Turkey, and more than 500,000 recognizing their ancestry, language and culture. There are other estimates, however, that place the number of people in Turkey with Albanian ancestry and or background upward to 5 million.

However, these assumptions of the Turkish government are contested by many scholars who claim they are without any basis.

=== Arabs ===
Arabs in Turkey number around 2 million, and they mostly live in provinces near the Syrian border, particularly the Hatay region, where they made up two fifths of the population in 1936.

However, including recent Syrian refugees, they make up to 5.3% of the population. Most of them are Sunni Muslims. However, there is a small group of Alawis, and another one of Arab Christians (mostly in Hatay Province) in communion with the Antiochian Orthodox Church.

Turkey experienced a large influx of Iraqis between the years of 1988 and 1991 due to both the Iran–Iraq War and the first Gulf War, with around 50,000 to 460,000 Iraqis entering the country.

Syrians in Turkey include migrants from Syria to Turkey, as well as their descendants. The number of Syrians in Turkey is estimated at over 3.58 million people as of April 2018, and consists mainly of refugees of the Syrian Civil War.

=== Armenians ===
Armenians are indigenous to the Armenian Highlands which correspond to the eastern half of modern-day Turkey, the Republic of Armenia, southern Georgia, western Azerbaijan, and northwestern Iran. Although the word Armenia was banned from being used in the press, schoolbooks, and governmental establishments in Turkey in 1880 and although it was subsequently replaced with words like eastern Anatolia or northern Kurdistan, Armenians had maintained much of their cultural heritage. The Armenian population of Turkey was greatly reduced following the Hamidian massacres and the Armenian genocide, when over one and a half million Armenians, virtually the entire Armenian population of Anatolia, were massacred. Prior to the start of the Genocide in 1915, the Armenian population of Turkey numbered about 1,914,620. The Armenian community of the Ottoman Empire before the Armenian genocide had an estimated 2,300 churches and 700 schools (with 82,000 students). This figure excludes churches and schools which belonged to the Protestant and Catholic Armenian parishes because the only churches and schools which were counted were the churches and schools which were under the jurisdiction of the Istanbul Armenian Patriarchate and the Apostolic Church. After the Armenian genocide however, it is estimated that 200,000 Armenians remained in Turkey. Today there are an estimated 40,000 to 70,000 Armenians in Turkey, not including the Hamshenis.

During the Turkish Republican era, Armenians were subjected to many policies which were designed to abolish Armenian cultural heritage such as the Turkification of last names, Islamification, geographical name changes, confiscation of properties, change of animal names, changes of the names of Armenian historical figures (i.e. the name of the prominent Balyan family were concealed under an identity of a superficial Italian family called Baliani), and the change and distortion of Armenian historical events.

Today, the Armenians are mostly concentrated around Istanbul. The Armenians support their own newspapers and schools. The majority belong to the Armenian Apostolic faith, with much smaller numbers of Armenian Catholics and Armenian Evangelicals. The community currently functions 34, 18 schools, and 2 hospitals.

=== Assyrians ===
Assyrians were once a large ethnic minority in the Ottoman Empire, but following the early 20th century Assyrian genocide, many were murdered, deported, or ended up emigrating. Those that remain live in small numbers in their indigenous South Eastern Turkey (although in larger numbers than other groups murdered in Armenian or Greek genocides) and Istanbul. They number around 30,000 and are part of the Syriac Orthodox Church, Chaldean Catholic Church and Church of the East.

=== Australians ===
There are as many as 12,000 Australians in Turkey. Of these, the overwhelming majority are in the capital Ankara (roughly 10,000) while the remaining are in Istanbul. Australian expatriates in Turkey form one of the largest overseas Australian groups in Europe and Asia. The vast majority of Australian nationals in Turkey are Turkish Australians.

=== Azerbaijanis ===
It is hard to determine how many ethnic Azeris currently reside in Turkey because ethnicity is a rather fluid concept in this country. Up to 300,000 of Azeris who reside in Turkey are citizens of Azerbaijan. In the Eastern Anatolia region, Azeris are sometimes referred to as acem (see Ajam) or tat. They currently are the largest ethnic group in the city of Iğdır and second largest ethnic group in Kars.

=== Bosniaks ===
Today, the existence of Bosniaks in the country is evident everywhere. In cities like Istanbul, Eskişehir, Ankara, İzmir, or Adana, one can easily find districts, streets, shops or restaurants with names such as Bosna, Yenibosna, Mostar, or Novi Pazar. However, it is extremely difficult to estimate how many Bosniaks live in this country. Some Bosnian researchers believe that the number of Bosniaks in Turkey is about two million.

=== Britons ===
There are at least 34,000 Britons in Turkey. They consist mainly of British citizens married to Turkish spouses, British Turks who have moved back into the country, students and families of long-term expatriates employed predominately in white-collar industry.

=== Bulgarians ===
People identifying as Bulgarian include a large number of the Pomak and a small number of Orthodox Bulgarians. According to Ethnologue at present 300,000 Pomaks in European Turkey speak Bulgarian as their mother tongue. It is very hard to estimate the number of Pomaks along with the Turkified Pomaks who live in Turkey, as they have blended into the Turkish society and have been often linguistically and culturally dissimilated. According to Milliyet and Turkish Daily News reports, the number of Pomaks along with the Turkified Pomaks in the country is about 600,000. According to the Bulgarian Ministry of Foreign Affairs, the Bulgarian Orthodox Christian community in Turkey stands at 500 members.

=== Central Asian peoples ===
Turkey received refugees from among the Pakistan-based Kazakhs, Turkmen, Kirghiz, and Uzbeks numbering 3,800 originally from Afghanistan during the Soviet–Afghan War. Kayseri, Van, Amasra, Cicekdag, Gaziantep, Tokat, Urfa, and Serinvol received via Adana the Pakistan-based Kazakh, Turkmen, Kirghiz, and Uzbek refugees numbering 3,800 with UNHCR assistance.

=== Chechens and Ingush ===
Chechens in Turkey are Turkish citizens of Chechen descent and Chechen refugees living in Turkey. Chechens and Ingush live in the provinces of Istanbul, Kahramanmaraş, Mardin, Sivas, and Muş.

=== Circassians ===
According to the newspaper Milliyet, there are approximately 2.5 million Circassians in Turkey, most of them settling after the Circassian genocide of 1864. According to the EU reports there are three to five million Circassians in Turkey. The closely related ethnic groups Abazins (10,000) and Abkhazians (39,000) are also often counted among them. Circassians are a Caucasian immigrant people, and although the Circassians in Turkey were forced to forget their language and assimilate into Turkish, a small minority still speak their native Circassian languages as it is still spoken in many Circassian villages, and the group that preserved their language the best are the Kabardians. With the rise of Circassian nationalism in the 21st century, Circassians in Turkey, especially the young, have started to study and learn their language. The Circassians in Turkey are mostly Sunni Muslims of Hanafi madh'hab. The largest association of Circassians in Turkey, KAFFED, is the founding member of the International Circassian Association (ICA).

=== Crimean Tatars ===
Before the 20th century, Crimean Tatars had immigrated from Crimea to Turkey in three waves: First, after the Russian annexation of Crimea in 1783; second, after the Crimean War of 1853–56; third, after the Russo-Turkish War of 1877–78. The official number of Crimean Tatars is 150,000 (in the center of Eskişehir) but the real population (in the whole of Turkey) may be around 6 million. They mostly live in Eskişehir Province, Ankara, and Istanbul.

=== Dagestani peoples ===
Various ethnic groups from Dagestan are present in Turkey. Dagestani peoples live in villages in the provinces like Balıkesir, Tokat and also scattered in other parts of the country. A majority among them are Nogais; Lezgins and Avars are other significant ethnic groups. Kumyks are also present.

=== Dom people ===
The Dom people, live mostly in Eastern Anatolia Region, also from Syria Dom Refugees came to Turkey.

=== Dutch ===
Approximately 15,000 Dutch live in Turkey.

=== Filipinos ===
There were 5,500 Filipinos in Turkey as of 2008, according to estimates by the Commission on Filipinos Overseas and the Philippine embassy in Ankara. Out of those, most are recorded as maids and "overseas workers" employed in households of diplomatic communities and elite Turkish families. Moreover, ten percent or approximately 500 Filipinos in Turkey are skilled workers and professionals working as engineers, architects, doctors and teachers. Most of the Filipinos reside in Istanbul, Ankara, Izmir, Antalya and nearby surrounding areas.

=== Georgians ===
There are approximately 1 million people of Georgian ancestry in Turkey according to the newspaper Milliyet. Georgians in Turkey are mostly Sunni Muslims of Hanafi madh'hab. Immigrant Georgians are called "Chveneburi", but autochthonous Muslim Georgians use this term as well. Muslim Georgians form the majority in parts of Artvin Province east of the Çoruh River. Immigrant Muslim groups of Georgian origin, found scattered in Turkey, are known as Chveneburi. The smallest Georgian group are Catholics living in Istanbul.

=== Germans ===
There are over 50,000 Germans living in Turkey, primarily Germans married to Turkish spouses, employees, retirees and long-term tourists who buy properties across the Turkish coastline, often spending most of the year in the country. In addition, many Turkish Germans have also returned and settled.

=== Greeks ===
The Greeks constitute a population of Greek and Greek-speaking Eastern Orthodox Christians who mostly live in Istanbul, including its district Princes' Islands, as well as on the two islands of the western entrance to the Dardanelles: Imbros and Tenedos (Turkish: Gökçeada and Bozcaada). Some Greek-speaking Byzantine Christians have been assimilated over the course of the last one thousand years.

They are the remnants of the estimated 200,000 Greeks who were permitted under the provisions of the Treaty of Lausanne to remain in Turkey following the 1923 population exchange, which involved the forcible resettlement of approximately 1.5 million Greeks from Anatolia and East Thrace and of half a million Turks from all of Greece except for Western Thrace. After years of persecution (e.g. the Varlık Vergisi and the Istanbul Pogrom), emigration of ethnic Greeks from the Istanbul region greatly accelerated, reducing the 119,822 -strong Greek minority before the attack to about 7,000 by 1978. The 2008 figures released by the Turkish Foreign Ministry places the current number of Turkish citizens of Greek descent at the 3,000–4,000 mark. According to Milliyet there are 15,000 Greeks in Turkey, while according to Human Rights Watch the Greek population in Turkey was estimated at 2,500 in 2006. According to the same source, the Greek population in Turkey was collapsing as the community was by then far too small to sustain itself demographically, due to emigration, much higher death rates than birth rates and continuing discrimination. In recent years however, most notably since the economic crisis in Greece, the trend has reversed. A few hundred to over a thousand Greeks now migrate to Turkey yearly for employment or educational purposes. Christian Greeks were forced to migrate as per the 1923 population exchange agreement. Muslim Greeks live in Turkey today. They live in cities of Trabzon and Rize. Pontic Greeks have Greek ancestry and speak the Pontic Greek dialect, a distinct form of the standard Greek language which, due to the remoteness of Pontus, has undergone linguistic evolution distinct from that of the rest of the Greek world. The Pontic Greeks had a continuous presence in the region of Pontus (modern-day northeastern Turkey), Georgia, and Eastern Anatolia from at least 700 BC until 1922.

Since 1924, the status of the Greek minority in Turkey has been ambiguous. Beginning in the 1930s, the government instituted repressive policies forcing many Greeks to emigrate. Examples are the labour battalions drafted among non-Muslims during World War II as well as the Fortune Tax levied mostly on non-Muslims during the same period. These resulted in financial ruination and death for many Greeks. The exodus was given greater impetus with the Istanbul Pogrom of September 1955 which led to thousands of Greeks fleeing the city, eventually reducing the Christian Greek population to about 7,000 by 1978 and to about 2,500 by 2006 before beginning to increase again after 2008.

=== Hindis ===
There are 3000 so called Hindis in Turkey, ca. 1,850 in and around Istanbul and 250 in Ankara. The rest are spread all over the country. They are the descendants of Indian, Afghan, Uzbek - Sufi-Dervish travelers who settled in the 14th to 19th centuries in Ottoman Empire and established there several Sufi Lodges.

=== Iranians ===
Shireen Hunter noted in a 2010 publication that there were 500,000 Iranians residing in Turkey.

=== Jews ===
There have been Jewish communities in Asia Minor since at least the 5th century BC and many Spanish and Portuguese Jews expelled from Spain came to the Ottoman Empire (including regions part of modern Turkey) in the late 15th century. Despite emigration during the 20th century, modern-day Turkey continues to have a small Jewish population of about 20,000.

=== Karachay ===
Karachay people live in villages concentrated in Konya and Eskişehir.

=== Kazakhs ===
There are about 30,000 Kazakh people living in Zeytinburnu-Istanbul. It is known that there are Kazakh people in other parts of Turkey, for instance Manisa, Konya. In 1969 and 1954 Kazakhs migrated into Anatolia's Salihli, Develi and Altay regions. Turkey became home to refugee Kazakhs. The Kazakh Turks Foundation (Kazak Türkleri Vakfı) is an organization of Kazakhs in Turkey. Kazakhs in Turkey came via Pakistan and Afghanistan. Kazak Kültür Derneği (Kazakh Culture Associration) is a Kazakh diaspora organization in Turkey.

=== Kurds ===
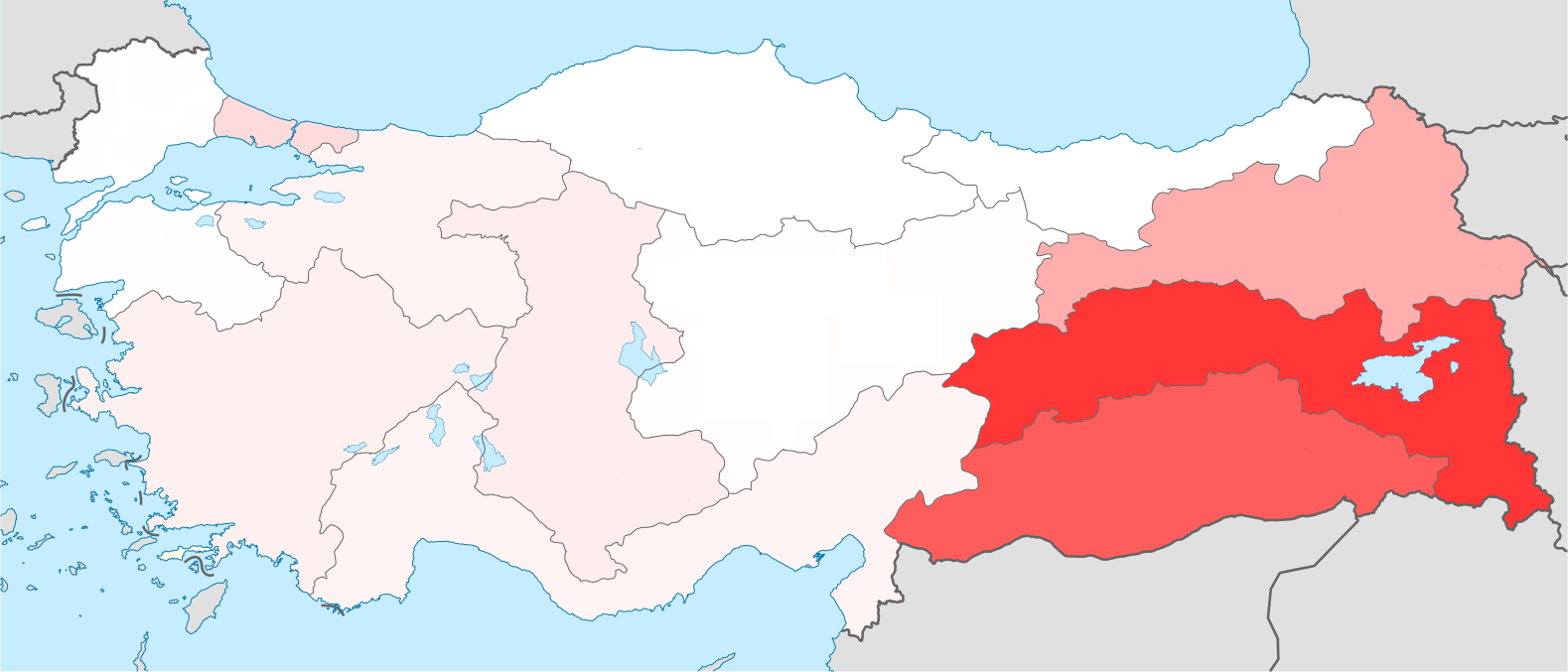
Percentage of Kurdish population in Turkey by region

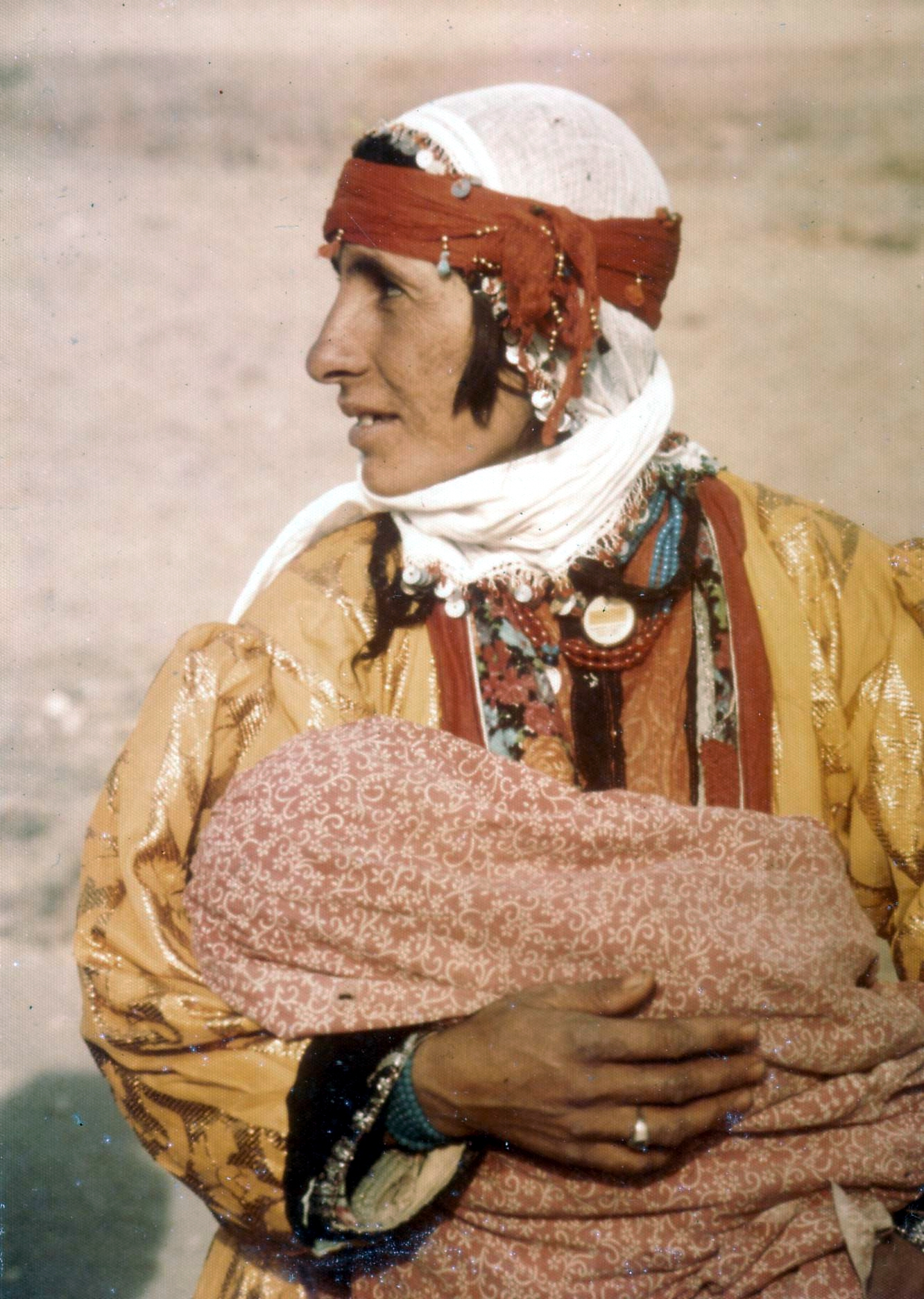
Kurdish mother and child, Van, Turkey. 1973

Ethnic Kurds are the largest minority in Turkey, composing around 20% of the population according to Milliyet, 19% of the total populace or c. 14 million people according to the CIA World Factbook, and as much as 23% according to Kurdologist David McDowall. Unlike the Turks, the Kurds speak an Iranian language. There are Kurds living all over Turkey, but most live to the east and southeast of the country, from where they originate.

In the 1930s, Turkish government policy aimed to forcibly assimilate and Turkify local Kurds. Since 1984, Kurdish resistance movements included both peaceful political activities for basic civil rights for Kurds within Turkey, and violent armed rebellion for a separate Kurdish state.

=== Kyrgyz ===
Turkey's Lake Van area is the home of Kyrgyz refugees from Afghanistan. Turkey became a destination for Kyrgyz refugees due to the Soviet–Afghan War from Afghanistan's Wakhan area 500 remained and did not go to Turkey with the others. Friendship and Culture Society of Kyrgyzstan (Кыргызстан Достук жана Маданият Коому) (Kırgızistan Kültür ve Dostluk Derneği Resmi Sitesi) is a Kyrgyz diaspora organization in Turkey.

They were airlifted in 1982 from Pakistan where they had sought refugee after the Soviet invasion of Afghanistan at the end of 1979. Their original home was at the eastern end of the Wakhan Corridor, in the Pamirs, bordering on China. It is not known how many Kyrgyz still live in Van and how many have moved on to other parts of Turkey.

=== Laz ===
Most Laz people today live in Turkey, but the Laz minority group has no official status in Turkey. The Laz are Sunni Muslims. Only a minority are bilingual in Turkish and their native Laz language which belongs to the Kartvelian group. The number of the Laz speakers is decreasing, and is now limited chiefly to the Rize and Artvin areas. The historical term Lazistan — formerly referring to a narrow tract of land along the Black Sea inhabited by the Laz as well as by several other ethnic groups — has been banned from official use and replaced with Doğu Karadeniz (which also includes Trabzon). During the Russo-Turkish War of 1877–1878, the Muslim population of Russia near the war zones was subjected to ethnic cleansing; many Lazes living in Batumi fled to the Ottoman Empire, settling along the southern Black Sea coast to the east of Samsun.

=== Levantines ===
Levantines continue to live in Istanbul (mostly in the districts of Galata, Beyoğlu and Nişantaşı), İzmir (mostly in the districts of Karşıyaka, Bornova and Buca), and the lesser port city Mersin where they had been influential for creating and reviving a tradition of opera. Famous people of the present-day Levantine community in Turkey include Maria Rita Epik, Franco-Levantine Caroline Giraud Koç and Italo-Levantine Giovanni Scognamillo.

=== Lom people ===
The Lom people live in the Black sea Region, and in Kars, Ardahan, and Artvin. They are also named as Poşa, they speak Lomavren.

=== Megleno-Romanians ===
Around 5,000 Muslim Megleno-Romanians live in Turkey.

=== Meskhetian Turks ===
There is a community of Meskhetian Turks (Ahiska Turks) in Turkey.

=== Ossetians ===
Ossetians emigrated from North Ossetia since the second half of the 19th century, end of Caucasian War. Today, the majority of them live in Ankara and Istanbul. There are 24 Ossetian villages in central and eastern Anatolia. The Ossetians in Turkey are divided into three major groups, depending on their history of immigration and ensuing events: those living in Kars (Sarıkamış) and Erzurum, those in Sivas, Tokat and Yozgat and those in Muş and Bitlis.

=== Poles ===
There are only 4,000 ethnic Poles in Turkey who have been assimilated into the main Turkish culture. The immigration did start during the Partitions of the Polish-Lithuanian Commonwealth. Józef Bem was one of the first immigrants and Prince Adam Jerzy Czartoryski founded Polonezköy in 1842. Most Poles in Turkey live in Polonezköy, Istanbul.

=== Roma ===
The Roma in Turkey number approximately 700,000 according to Milliyet. Sulukule is the oldest Roma settlement in Europe. By different Turkish and Non-Turkish estimates the number of Romani is up to 4 or 5 million while according to a Turkish source, they are only 0.05% of Turkey's population (or roughly persons). The descendants of the Ottoman Roma today are known as Xoraxane Roma and are of the Islamic faith.

=== Russians ===
Russians in Turkey number about 50,000 citizens. Russians began migrating to Turkey during the first half of the 1990s. Most were fleeing the economic problems prevalent after the dissolution of the Soviet Union. During this period, many Russian immigrants intermarried and assimilated with Turkish locals, giving rise to a rapid increase in mixed marriages. There is a Russian Association of Education, Culture and Cooperation which aims to expand Russian language and culture in Turkey as well as promote the interests of the community.

=== Serbs ===
In the 1965 Census 6,599 Turkish citizen spoke Serbian as a first language and another 58,802 spoke Serbian as a second language.

=== Turkish Cypriots ===
Turkish Cypriots or Cypriot Turks are a group of Turks that arrived in Turkey in different waves from 1878 to the current. Currently the Turkish Cypriot population is estimated to be between the 300,000 to over 650,000.

=== Uyghurs ===
Turkey is home to 50,000 Uyghurs. A community of Uyghurs live in Turkey. Kayseri received Uyghurs numbering close to 360 via the UNHCR in 1966–1967 from Pakistan. The Turkey-based Uyghur diaspora had a number of family members among Saudi Arabia, Afghanistan, India, and Pakistan based Uyghurs who stayed behind while the UNHCR and government of Turkey had Kayseri receive 75 Uyghurs in 1967 and 230 Uyghurs in 1965 and a number in 1964 under Alptekin and Bughra. We never call each other Uyghur, but only refer to ourselves as East Turkestanis, or Kashgarlik, Turpanli, or even Turks.- according to some Uyghurs born in Turkey.

A community of Uyghurs live in Istanbul. Tuzla and Zeytinburnu mosques are used by the Uyghurs in Istanbul. Piety is a characteristic of among Turkey dwelling Uyghurs.

Istanbul's districts of Küçükçekmece, Sefaköy and Zeytinburnu are home to Uyghur communities. Eastern Turkistan Education and Solidarity Association is located in Turkey. Abdurahmon Abdulahad of the East Turkistan Education Association supported Uzbek Islamists who protested against Russia and Islam Karimov's Uzbekistan government. Uyghurs are employed in Küçükçekmece and Zeytinburnu restaurants. East Turkistan Immigration Association, East Turkistan Culture and Solidarity Association, and Eastern Turkistan Education and Solidarity Association are Uyghur diaspora organizations in Turkey.

=== Uzbeks ===
Turkey is home to 45,000 Uzbeks. In the 1800s Konya's north Bogrudelik was settled by Tatar Bukharlyks. In 1981 Afghan Turkestan refugees in Pakistan moved to Turkey to join the existing Kayseri, Izmir, Ankara, and Zeytinburnu based communities. Turkish based Uzbeks have established links to Saudi-based Uzbeks.

=== Vallahades ===
The Patriyotlar in Turkey are ethnic Macedonians (Greeks) of Bektashi Order.., they converted to Islam during the time of the Ottoman Empire, once lived in the Sanjak of Serfiğe. Because of their pro-Turkish attitude, at the Greco-Turkish War (1919–1922), this Group of Vallahades were called Patriyotlar (Vatanseverler), sometimes called as "Rumyöz". At the Population exchange between Greece and Turkey in 1923, they moved to Turkey and settled in Edirne, Lüleburgaz, Çorlu and Büyükçekmece in East Thrace and Samsun and Manisa in Anatolia. The first Generation only speak Greek and not Turkish, yet their descendants speak Turkish.

=== Zazas ===
The Zazas are a people in eastern Turkey who natively speak the Zaza language. Their heartland, the Dersim region, consists of Tunceli, Bingöl provinces and parts of Elazığ, Erzincan and Diyarbakır provinces. Their language Zazaki is a language spoken in eastern Anatolia between the rivers Euphrates and Tigris. It belongs to the northwest-Iranian group of the Iranian language branch of the Indo-European language family. The Zaza language is related to Kurdish, Persian and Balōchi. An exact indication of the number of Zaza speakers is unknown. Internal Zaza sources estimate the total number of Zaza speakers at 3 to 6 million.

== Religious minorities ==
=== Atheists ===
In Turkey, atheism is the biggest group after Islam. The percentage of atheists according to polls apparently rose from about 2% in 2012 to approximately 3% in 2018 KONDA Survey.

=== Bahá'í ===
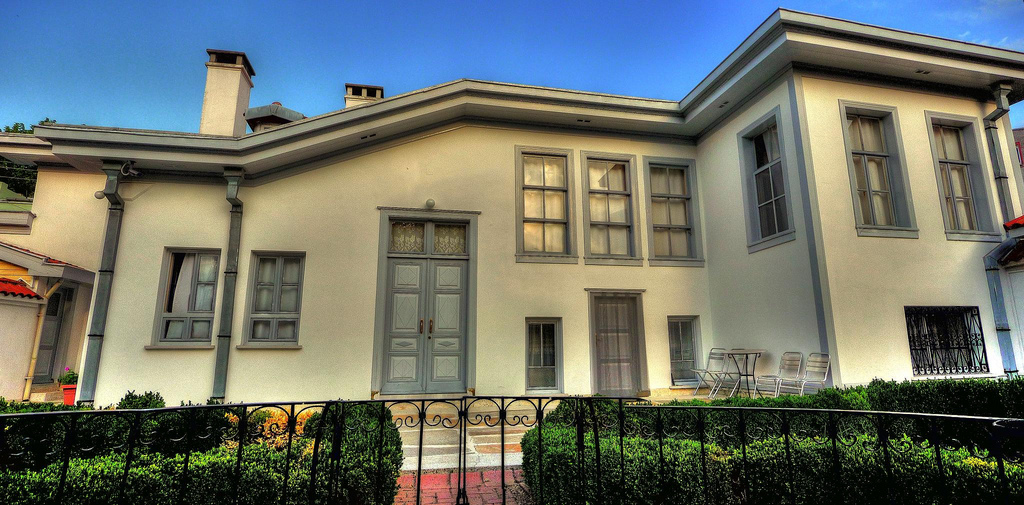
The house where the founder of the Bahá'í Faith, Bahá'u'lláh stayed in, Edirne

The Turkish cities of Edirne and Istanbul are holy in the Bahá’í Faith. The estimated Bahá'í population of Turkey is 10,000 (2008)

=== Christians ===
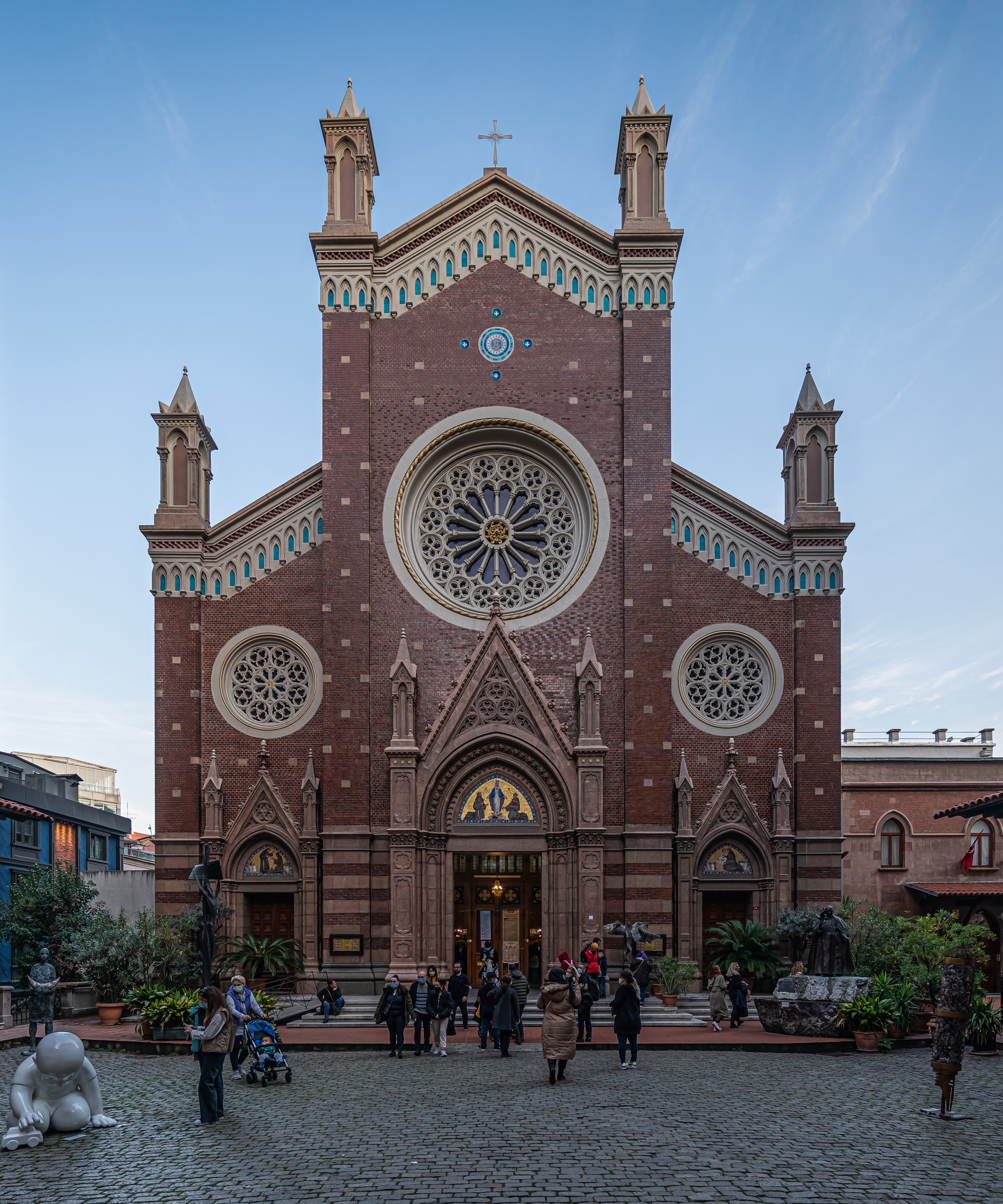
Church of St. Anthony of Padua in Istanbul.

Christianity has a long history in Anatolia which, nowadays part of the Republic of Turkey's territory, was the birthplace of numerous Christian Apostles and Saints, such as Apostle Paul of Tarsus, Timothy, St. Nicholas of Myra, St. Polycarp of Smyrna and many others. Two out of the five centers (Patriarchates) of the ancient Pentarchy were located in present-day Turkey: Constantinople (Istanbul) and Antioch (Antakya). All of the first seven Ecumenical Councils which are recognized by both the Western and Eastern churches were held in present-day Turkey. Of these, the Nicene Creed, declared with the First Council of Nicaea (İznik) in 325, is of utmost importance and has provided the essential definitions of present-day Christianity.

In 2022, Christians were seen as being 0.2% of the population. Estimates included 90,000 Armenian Orthodox, 25,000 Roman Catholics, 25,000 Syrian Orthodox, 150,000 Eastern Orthodox (largely due to an influx of an estimated 60,000 Russians and 40,000 Ukrainians), 2,000-3,500 Armenian Catholics, fewer than 3,000 Chaldean Christians, 7,000 to 10,000 members of Protestant and evangelical Christian, fewer than 2,500 Greek Orthodox and small groups of Bulgarian Orthodox and Georgian Orthodox Christians.

==== Orthodox Christians ====
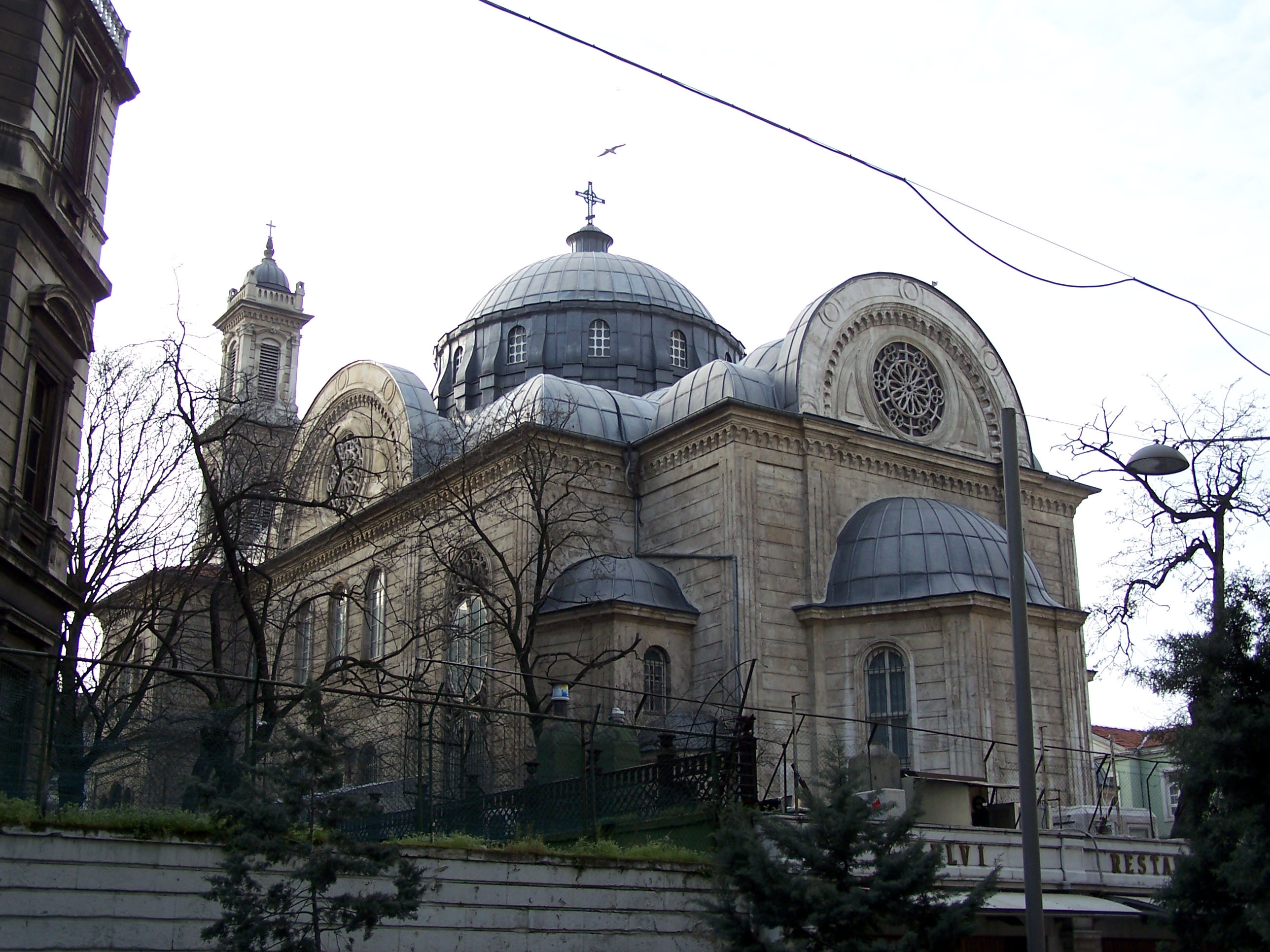
Aya Triada Greek Orthodox church in Beyoğlu, Istanbul

Orthodox Christianity forms a tiny minority in Turkey, comprising far less than one tenth of one percent of the entire population. The provinces of Istanbul and Hatay, which includes Antakya, are the main centres of Turkish Christianity, with comparatively dense Christian populations, though they are very small minorities. The main variant of Christianity present in Turkey is the Eastern Orthodox branch, focused mainly in the Greek Orthodox Church.

==== Catholics ====
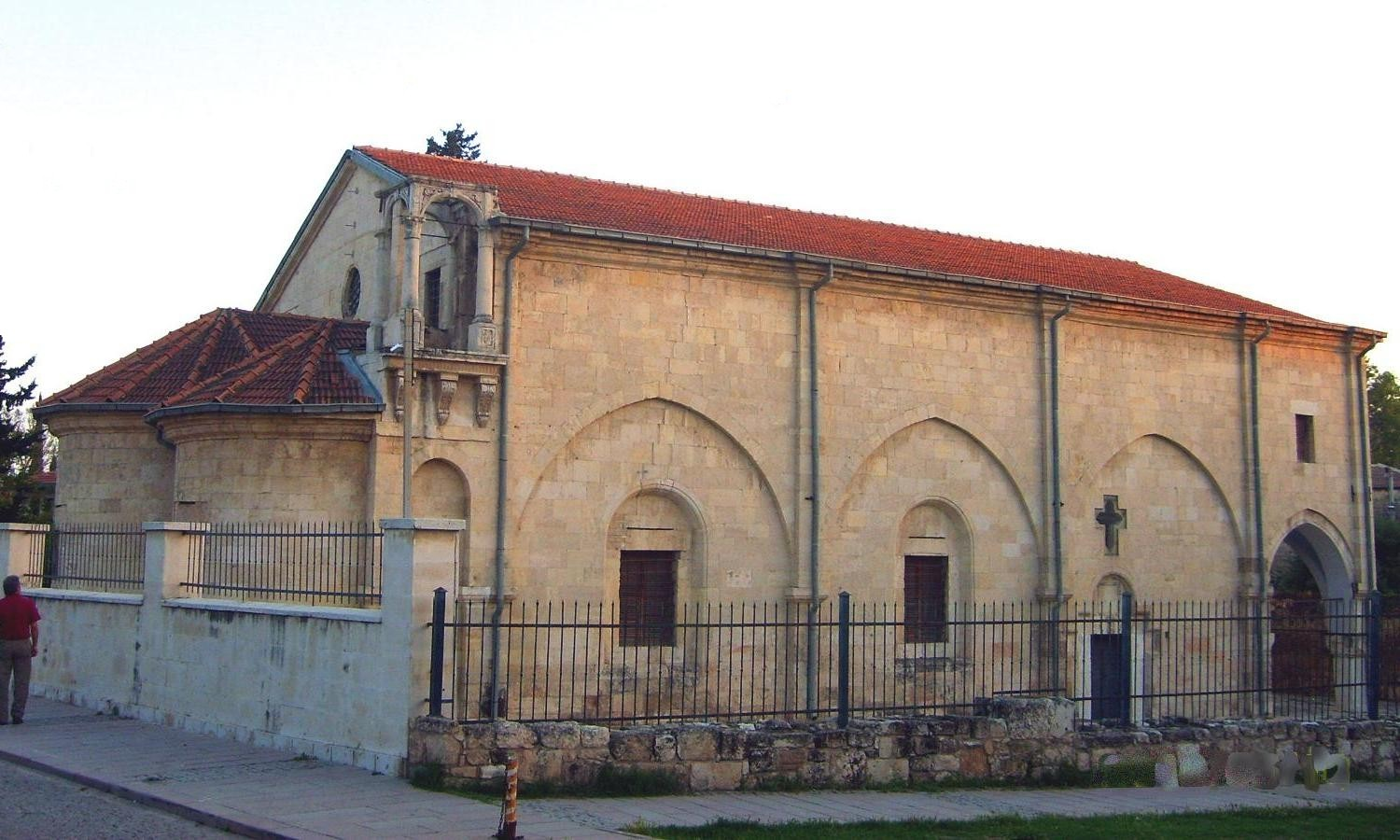
The Church of St. Paul in Tharsus

There are around 35,000 Catholics, constituting 0.05% of the population. The faithful are of the Latin Church, Melkite Greek Catholic Church, Armenian Catholic Church, Syriac Catholic Church, and Chaldean Catholic Church. Most Latin Catholics are Levantines of mainly Italian or French background, although a few are ethnic Turks (who are usually converts via marriage to Levantines or other non-Turkish Catholics). Byzantine, Armenian, Syriac, and Chaldean Catholics are generally members of the Greek (and Syrian), Armenian, Syrian, and Assyrian minority groups respectively. Turkey's Catholics are concentrated in Istanbul.

In February 2006, Catholic priest Andrea Santoro, an Italian missionary working in Turkey for 10 years, was shot twice at his church near the Black Sea. He had written a letter to the Pope asking him to visit Turkey. Pope Benedict XVI visited Turkey in November 2006. Relations had been rocky since Pope Benedict XVI had stated his opposition to Turkey joining the European Union. The Council of Catholic Bishops met with the Turkish prime minister in 2004 to discuss restrictions and difficulties such as property issues. More recently, Bishop Luigi Padovese, on June 6, 2010, the Vicar Apostolic of Turkey, was killed.

==== Protestants ====
Protestants comprise far less than one tenth of one percent of the population of Turkey, or less than 10,000 people. Even so, there is an Alliance of Protestant Churches in Turkey. The constitution of Turkey recognizes freedom of religion for individuals. The Armenian Protestants own three Istanbul Churches from the 19th century. On 4 November 2006, a Protestant place of worship was attacked with six Molotov cocktails. Turkish media have criticized Christian missionary activity intensely.

There is an ethnic Turkish Protestant Christian community most of them came from recent Muslim Turkish backgrounds, rather than from ethnic minorities.

=== Jews ===
Jewish communities have lived in Asia Minor since at least the 5th century BC and many Spanish and Portuguese Jews who were expelled from Spain were allowed to settle in the Ottoman Empire (including regions which were located in parts of modern Turkey) in the late 15th century. Despite emigration during the 20th century, modern-day Turkey continues to have a small Jewish population. There is a small Karaite Jewish population which numbers around 100. Karaite Jews are not considered Jews by the Turkish Hakham Bashi.

=== Muslims ===
==== Alawites ====
The exact number of Alawites in Turkey is unknown, but there were 185 000 Alawites in 1970. As Muslims, they are not recorded separately from Sunnis in ID registration. In the 1965 census (the last Turkish census where informants were asked their mother tongue), 180,000 people in the three provinces declared their mother tongue as Arabic. However, Arabic-speaking Sunni and Christian people are also included in this figure.

Alawites traditionally speak the same dialect of Levantine Arabic with Syrian Alawites. Arabic is best preserved in rural communities and Samandağ. Younger people in Çukurova cities and (to a lesser extent) in İskenderun tend to speak Turkish. Turkish spoken by Alawites is distinguished by Alawites and non-Alawites alike with its particular accents and vocabulary. Knowledge of Arabic alphabet is confined to religious leaders and men who had worked or studied in Arab countries.

==== Alevis ====
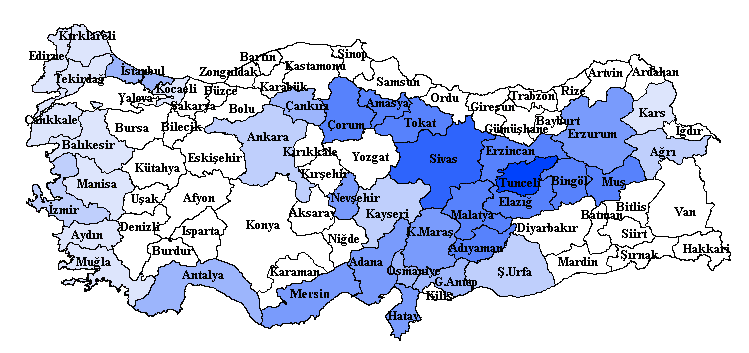
Proportion of Alevis in Turkey

Alevis are the biggest religious minority in Turkey. Nearly 15%-25% of all Turkish population is in this group. They are mainly Turk but there are significant Kurd and Zaza populations who are Alevi

==== Twelvers ====
Twelver Shia population of Turkey is nearly 3 million and most of them are Azeris. Half million of Ja'faris live in Istanbul.

=== Yazidi ===
Yazidis in Turkey is in the area of the Yazidi homeland, along with Syria and Iraq. The Yazidi population in Turkey was estimated at around 22.000 in 1984. Earlier figures are difficult to obtain and verify, but some estimate there were about 100.000 Yazidi in Turkey in the early years of the 20th century.

Most Yazidis left the country and went abroad in the 1980s and 1990s, mostly to Germany and other European countries where they got asylum due to the persecution as an ethnic and religious minority in Turkey. The area they resided was in the south eastern area of Turkey, an area that had/has heavy PKK fighting. Now a few hundred Yazidi are believed to be left in Turkey.

=== Tengrists ===
In intellectual circles in Turkey, more and more Turkish people are turning to Tengrism. As an example, a lawyer who possessed an ID card which states that Tengrism is a religion won a court case.

== See also ==
- Demographics of Turkey
- Languages of Turkey
- Geographical name changes in Turkey
- Human rights in Turkey
- Racism and discrimination in Turkey
- Religion in Turkey
- Freedom of religion in Turkey
- The Twenty Classes
- Turkish Kurdistan
- Western Armenia
- Turkish diaspora
- Turkish minorities in the former Ottoman Empire
- Black people in the Ottoman Empire
- Turks in the former Soviet Union
- Black people in Turkey
- Afghans in Turkey
- Albanians in Turkey
- Arabs in Turkey
- Armenians in Turkey
- Assyrians in Turkey
- Azerbaijanis in Turkey
- Australians in Turkey
- Britons in Turkey
- Canadians in Turkey
- Chinese people in Turkey
- Crimean Tatars in Turkey
- Greeks in Turkey
- Iraqis in Turkey
- Japanese people in Turkey
- Laz people in Turkey
- Russians in Turkey
- Yörüks
