= London Turkish Radio =

Coordinates: 51°35′42.6″N 0°6′33″W

London Turkish Radio (Londra Türk Radyosu)
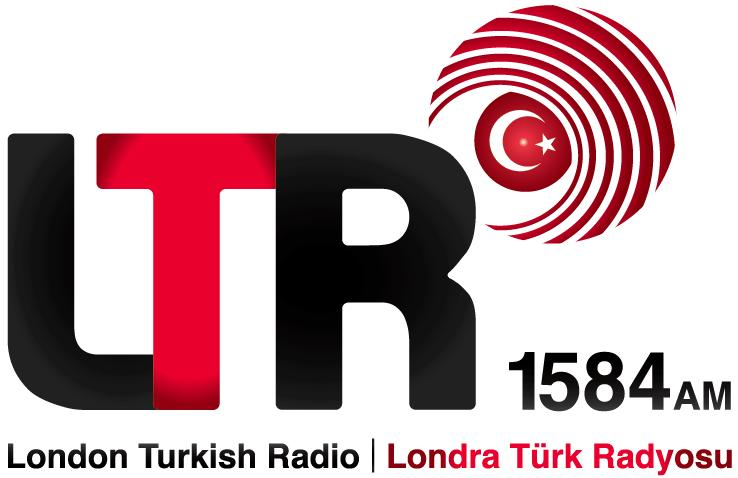

London; England
- Broadcast area: Greater London
- Frequency: Online

Programming
- Format: Turkish language community radio

Ownership
- Owner: London Turkish Radio; (Kirmizi Beyaz Kibris Ltd.)

History
- First air date: 1990
- Former call signs: Turkish Radio (1990–1994)
- Former frequencies: 1584 MW kHz

Technical information
- Power: 200 Watts

Links
- Website: www.londraturkradyosu.com

London Turkish Radio (LTR) is a Turkish radio station specialising in music, news, and politics. It broadcast to London on 1584 kHz AM from 1990 to 2013 and currently broadcasts online.

== History ==
The radio station was launched in 1990 and was called the Turkish Radio, broadcasting to the Turkish and Turkish speaking Communities for the first time under the name of Turkish Radio, for only one hour per day between the hours of midnight to 1a.m. Because the response to the small broadcast was so successful, a licence to broadcast 24 hours a day was granted.

The name of the radio station changed in 1994 to London Turkish Radio (LTR), and has since grown in popularity, and is the only fully licensed radio station broadcasting in Turkish for a full 24hr. period outside Turkey and Northern Cyprus.

== Coverage ==
Coverage extends over most of the London Boroughs where large numbers of Turkish and Turkish speaking communities reside. According to Ofcom (Office of Communications), LTR has over 80,000 listeners in the London Borough of Haringey alone. LTR's licence was re-awarded in November 2002 and commenced running in August 2003 until 2011.

== Internet radio service ==
London Turkish Radio has through its online live Internet service, attracted popularity throughout the world, from the United States to Europe, and Asia, and as far as Australia and Japan.

== See also ==
- Turks in London
- British Turks
