= Federation of Turkish Associations UK =

Organisation for the Turkish diaspora

Federation of Turkish Associations UK (FTAUK) is an umbrella organisation founded on 30 May 2002 in the United Kingdom. Its main aims and objectives is to support the approximately 500,000 British Turks (including Turkish Cypriots) to integrate better within British society, as well as to promote the Turkish culture and British-Turkish relations. Its membership is made up of 16 Turkish organisations within the United Kingdom, predominantly based in London.

== See also ==
- Turks in the United Kingdom
