= Shacklewell Lane Mosque =

Mosque in London, England

Coordinates: 51.5509°N 0.0742°W

- Shacklewell Camii
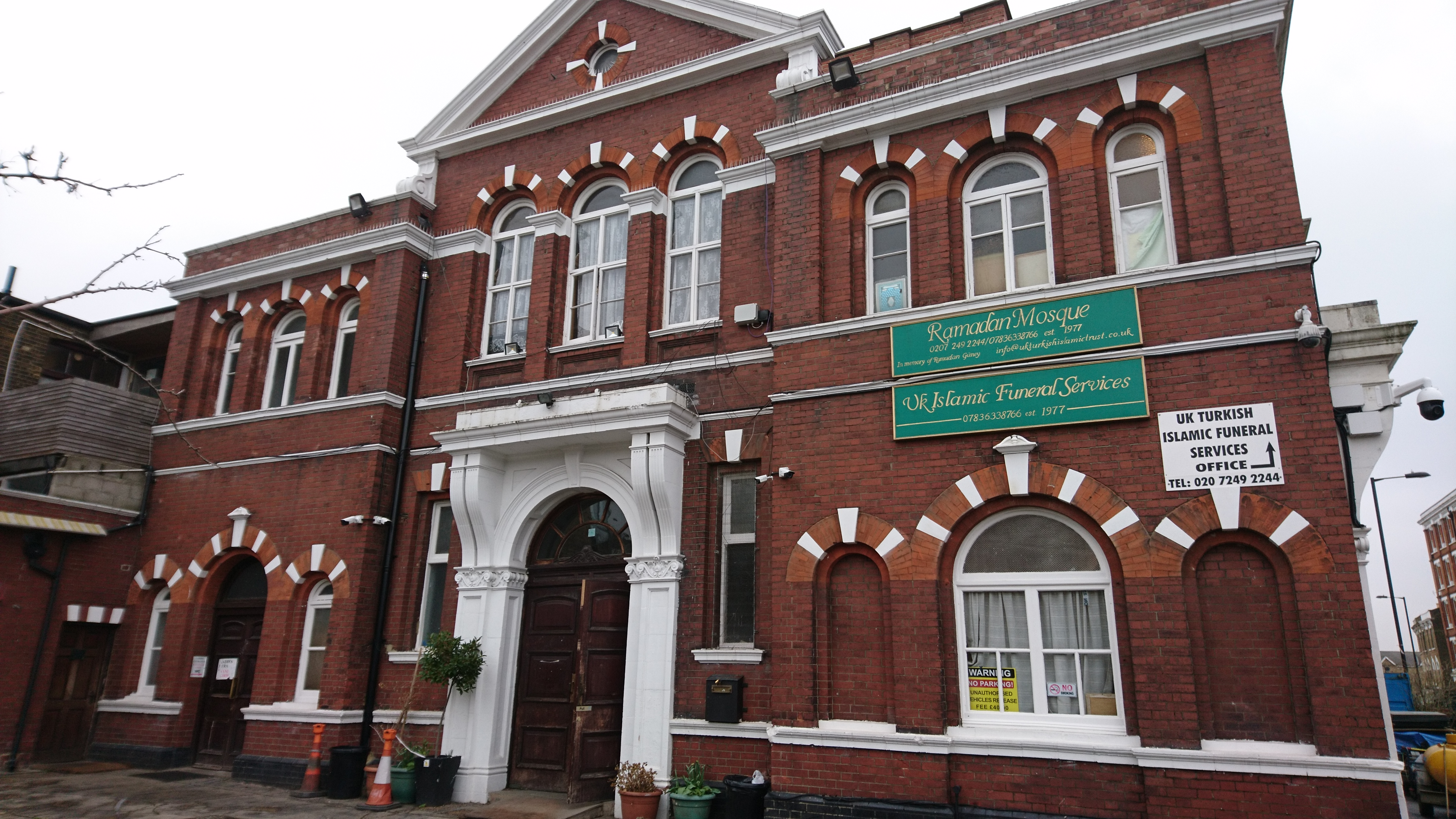
- Ramadan Mosque

- Location within Greater London

Religion
- Affiliation: Islam

Location
- Location: Shacklewell, London, United Kingdom

Architecture
- Type: Mosque
- Style: Andalusian architecture
- Founder: Ramadan Güney
- Completed: 1977
- Dome: 1

Website
- https://www.masjidramadan.org

Shacklewell Lane Mosque (Turkish: Shacklewell Camii) is a Turkish mosque located in Shacklewell, London. Established by Ramadan Güney, his wife Suheyla Güney and other Trustees Turkish Cypriot in 1977, it is the first ever Turkish mosque in the United Kingdom. The mosque is an Andalusian-style building and was previously a synagogue, known as the New Dalston Synagogue.

== See also ==
- Aziziye Mosque (London)
- Suleymaniye Mosque (London)
- Islam in London
- Islam in the United Kingdom
- Turks in the United Kingdom
