= Aziziye Mosque (London) =

Mosque in London, England, United Kingdom

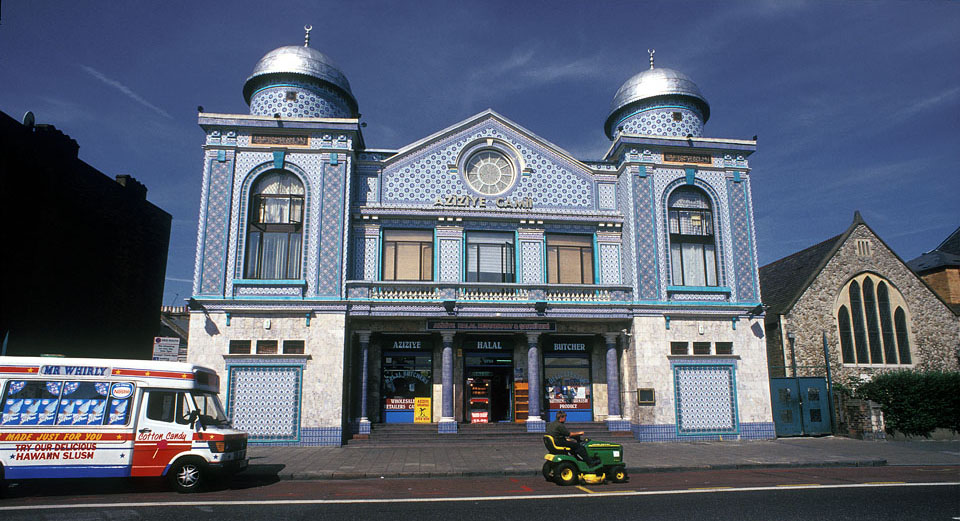

- Location within Greater London

Religion
- Affiliation: Islam

Location
- Location: Stoke Newington, London, United Kingdom
- Coordinates: 51.5553°N 0.075°W

Architecture
- Type: Mosque
- Completed: 1983
- Minaret: 2

The Aziziye Mosque (Turkish: Aziziye Camii) is a mosque in Stoke Newington, London. The mosque was funded by the UK Turkish Islamic Association and the conversion began in 1983. Turks who had once felt reluctant to attend a ‘non-Turkish’ mosque welcomed the congregation as services were provided in the Turkish language rather than in English or Arabic. The total capacity is 2,000 people. The institution includes a Halal butcher, a weekend school (Aziziye Education Centre), a wedding hall and a restaurant.

Originally built as a cinema, it first opened in 1913 as the Apollo Picture House, was reopened in 1933 as the Ambassador Cinema and from 1974 played martial arts films and softcore sex films as the Astra Cinema, before closing in 1983. It is among Hackney Council's "Locally Listed Buildings."

== See also ==
- Shacklewell Lane Mosque
- Suleymaniye Mosque (London)
- Islam in London
- Turks in the United Kingdom
