= London Turkish Gazette =

Newspaper

- Londra Gazete
- Formation: 2001; 22 Years Ago
- Type: News & Media
- Location: London, UK
- Official language: Turkish & English
- Website: http://www.londragazete.com

The London Turkish Gazette (Turkish: Londra Gazete) is a newspaper based in London, UK, serving London's Turkish, Kurdish and Turkish-Cypriot communities (see also: British Turks). It is a bilingual newspaper published in both Turkish and English and is published weekly on Thursdays. It has a circulation of 39,000.
