= Toplum Postası =

Toplum Postası (lit. "Community Post") is the first Turkish newspaper in the United Kingdom. Established by the "Turkish Cypriot Community Association" in 1976, it was designed to serve the Turkish Cypriot community in the United Kingdom. It is written in both Turkish and English with a circulation of about 20,000. Furthermore, Toplum Postası has over 80,000 online readers from the UK, 7,500 from the United States and 6,500 from Australia and Canada as well as thousands more from Argentina, Brazil and South Africa.

== See also ==
- Turks in the United Kingdom
