= Ramadan Güney =

British-Turkish Cypriot businessman and politician

- Ramadan Güney in later life
- Born: 18 February 1932; Paphos, British Cyprus
- Died: 2 November 2006 (aged 74); North Cyprus
- Spouse: Süheyla Güney
- Children: Gulen Musa, Alev Kanli, Onder Guney, Zerin Korkmazer, Erkin Guney, Gonul Guney and Houssein Guney (Beaux South)

Ramadan Güney (18 February 1932 – 2 November 2006) was a British-Turkish Cypriot businessman and politician. He was the owner of Brookwood Cemetery, the largest cemetery in the United Kingdom, with the aim of establishing a Turkish cemetery. Güney was also the founder and chairman of the UK Turkish Islamic Trust and had established the first Turkish mosque in London, Shacklewell Lane Mosque, in 1977.

He was also a founding member of the VOLKAN organisation in Cyprus, established in the 1950s as part of the struggle against the Greek Cypriot nationalists, EOKA. He was in later years a Member of Parliament and presidential candidate in Northern Cyprus.

== Life ==
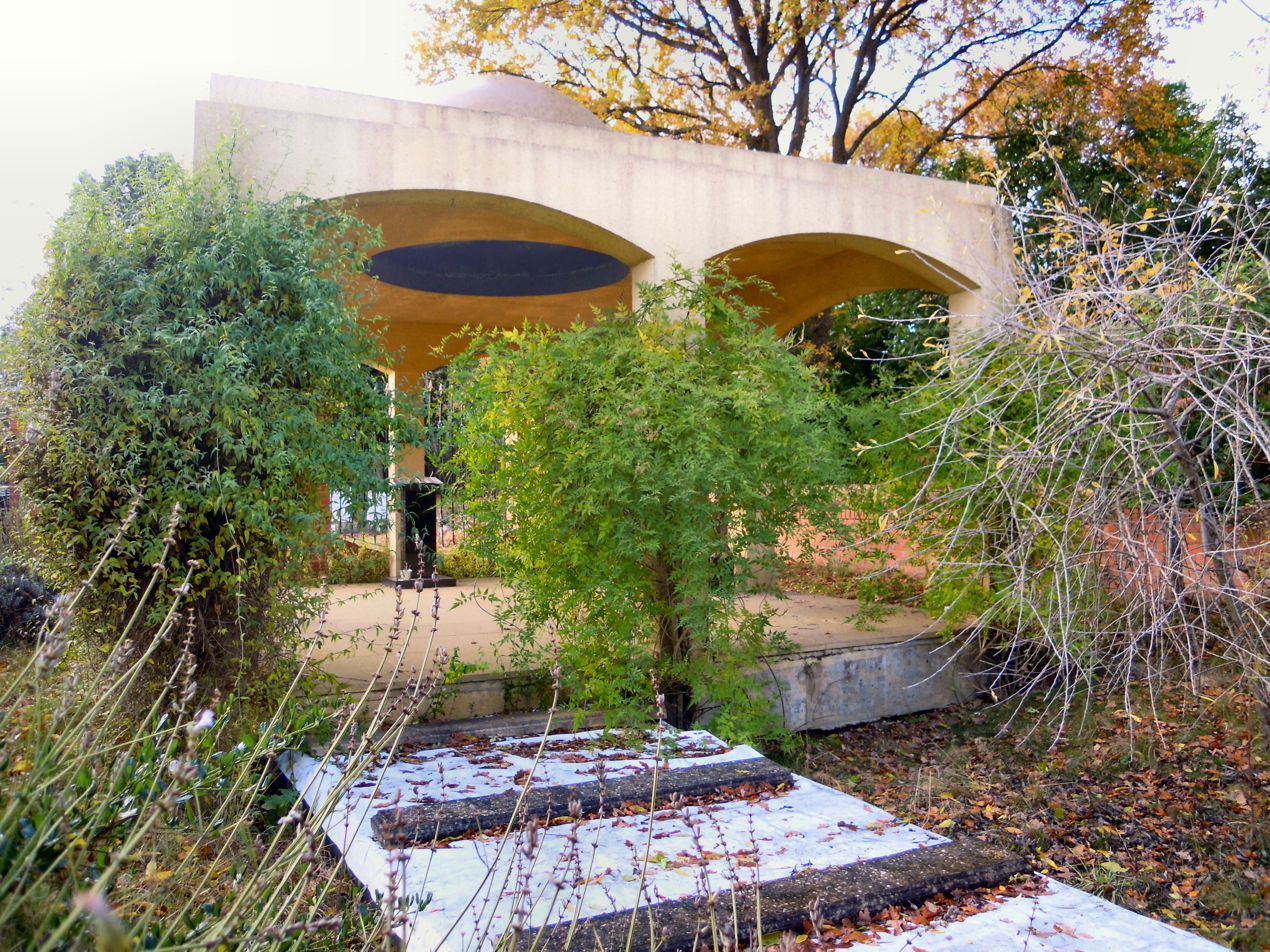
Güney's mausoleum in Brookwood Cemetery

Güney was born in Paphos, Cyprus in 1932 to Turkish Cypriot parents. After leaving school, he served in the British Army and police on the island. However, in 1955, with the rise of EOKA Greek Cypriots fought a violent campaign for the end of British rule as well as for union with Greece (enosis); Güney fought against this by becoming a founding member of the Volkan organisation. In 1958 he emigrated to Britain where he set up a music publishing business and became a millionaire at the age of 35. In 1977 he helped found and run the first Turkish Cypriot mosque in London, called the Shacklewell Lane Mosque, and worked on a variety of social and community projects, arising from his work with the UK Turkish Islamic Centre.

He acquired Brookwood Cemetery in 1985, the purchase evolving from Güney's role as Chairman of the UK Turkish Islamic Trust, which wanted suitable burial facilities for its members.

In 1990 he stood guarantor for £1m for the bail of Asil Nadir, who was accused and eventually convicted of theft in his role as the chief executive of Polly Peck, a British textile company. Nadir eventually fled, but the courts ruled that Güney was not liable to pay the £1m because bail had not technically been renewed; it also turned out that Güney had warned the Serious Fraud Office in advance of his concerns that Nadir might flee.

He died at the age of 74 in Northern Cyprus. Following a service at his mosque in London, he was buried in his family vault at Brookwood Cemetery on Friday 10 November 2006.

== Personal life ==
Güney was married to Süheyla Güney who died in 1992. They had two sons and four daughters from this marriage.

Diane Holliday was Güney's partner of six years before his death. In 2011, the inheritance of the cemetery was successfully challenged by Diane Holliday and her adult son from a previous marriage, Kevin.
