= Britons in Turkey =

Türkiye'deki İngilizler (Turkish)

Total population
- 35,000

Regions with significant populations
- Istanbul · Ankara · İzmir · Fethiye · Didim

Languages
- English (British) · Turkish

Religion
- Protestantism · Anglicanism · Atheism · Agnosticism · Sunni Islam

Related ethnic groups
- British people · British diaspora

There are at least 34,000 Britons in Turkey. They consist mainly of British citizens married to Turkish spouses, British Turks who have moved back into the country, students, and families of long-term expatriates employed predominantly in white-collar industry. There are also a few British retirees and pensioners who choose to live in the country after retirement, currently numbering up to 1,000. Many British firms are active in Turkey; consequently, many British employees working in Turkey are originally stationed by companies and multinational corporations back home, and can be seen serving in capacities such as general managers, marketing consultants and financial directors. They tend to be involved in sales, marketing, technical and human resources departments.

The majority of white-collar worker Britons are found in Istanbul and İzmir, with smaller populations scattered throughout the capital Ankara. British residents living in smaller urban centres are mainly occupied in the textile and energy sectors.

== Social and business life ==
Many community and business organisations are active. One business organisation is the British Chamber of Commerce, which supports British businesses in Turkey.

In 2008, a poll was conducted among retired British expats in Turkey, with the question being whether they would approve of Turkey's accession to the European Union. The results showed a great number replying in the negative, citing concerns that doing so may cause Turkey to lose its identity and culture. The poll showed that many Britons are attracted to Turkey because of its unique cultural aspects, as well as its favourable climate, cheaper standards of living, the social circles and less pressure in daily life.

== Notable people ==
- Yasemin Allen is an English-Turkish actress.
- Anna Larpent was a British diarist.
- Veronica of the Passion was an Ottoman-born English Catholic nun.
- Michael Babington Smith was a British banker, sportsman and soldier from the Babington family.

== See also ==
- Turkey–United Kingdom relations
- British Turks
