= Suleymaniye Mosque (London) =

Mosque in London, England, United Kingdom

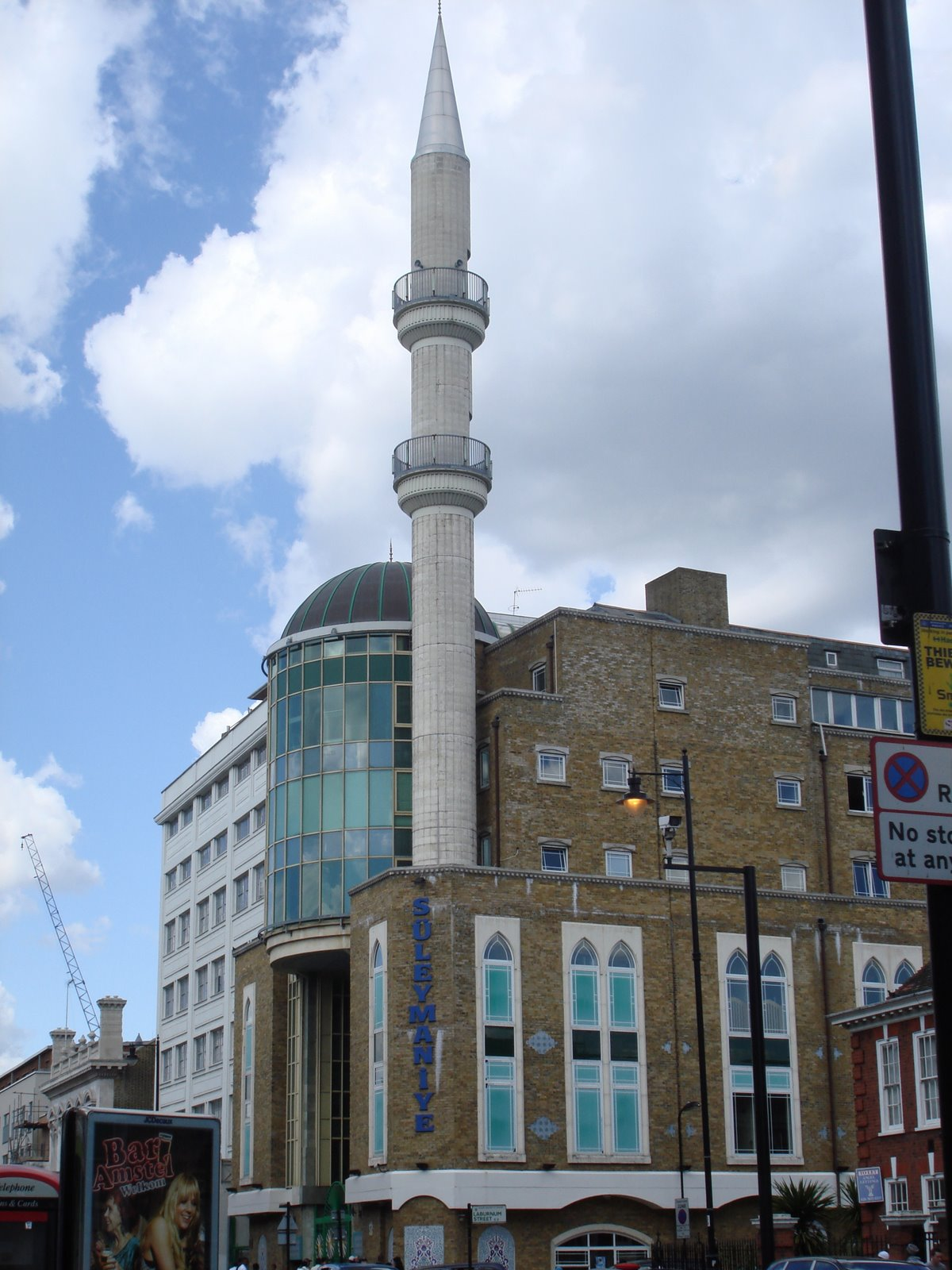

- Location of the mosque in Greater London

Religion
- Affiliation: Sunni Islam
- Ecclesiastical or organisational status: Mosque
- Status: Active

Location
- Location: Haggerston, London
- Country: United Kingdom
- Coordinates: 51°32′07″N 0°04′36″W

Architecture
- Type: Mosque architecture
- Style: Ottoman
- Groundbreaking: 1994
- Completed: 1999

Specifications
- Capacity: 3,000 worshippers
- Interior area: 8,000 m^{2} (86,000 sq ft)
- Minaret: One
- Minaret height: 66 m (218 ft)

Website
- suleymaniye.org

The Suleymaniye Mosque (Turkish: Süleymaniye Camii) is a Sunni mosque, located on Kingsland Road in Haggerston, London, England, in the United Kingdom. The mosque serves the Turkish speaking community and Muslims living in the Borough of Hackney.

Construction of the mosque was funded by the UK Turkish Islamic Cultural Centre (UKTICC) and the construction began in 1994 and was opened to the public in October 1999. With a total floor space of 8,000 square metres (86,000 sq ft), the total capacity of its Ottoman-style mosque is 3,000 people. The mosque includes a conference and wedding hall, classrooms, funeral service facilities as well as accommodation for Marathon School students.

The minaret reaches a height of 66 metres (218 ft), the highest in the United Kingdom. The Suleymaniye Mosque is a local landmark and it is one of London's key Islamic centres.

Prince Charles visited the mosque in 2001.

== See also ==
- Islam in London
- List of mosques in England
- Turks in the United Kingdom
