= British Turks =

Ethnic group in the United Kingdom

Turks in the United Kingdom Birleşik Krallık'taki Türkler
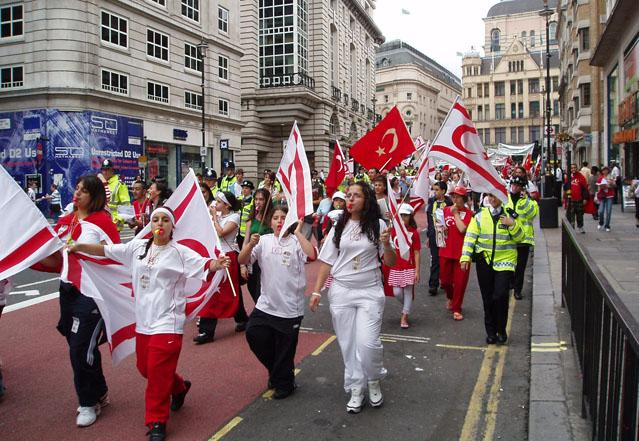
- British Turks protesting in Central London

Total population
- Turkish-born residents in the United Kingdom: 132,651 (2021/22 Census)^{a} England: 124,758 (2021); Scotland: 4,348 (2022); Wales: 2,886 (2021); Northern Ireland: 659 (2021); Previous estimates: 101,721 (2011 UK Census); 72,000 (2009 ONS estimate); 150,000 (academic estimates); Turkish Cypriot-born residents^{a} 100,000–150,000 (academic estimates); Total population^{b} 500,000 (2011 Home Office estimate)

Regions with significant populations
- London (Enfield, Hackney, Haringey, Islington, Palmers Green, Seven Sisters, Waltham Forest, and Wood Green), Cheshunt

Languages
- British English; Turkish (including the Cypriot Turkish dialect)

Religion
- Predominantly Sunni Islam; Minority Shia Islam, Alevi Islam, other religions, and irreligion
- ^{a} Official data regarding the British Turkish community excludes British-born and dual heritage children of Turkish origin.^{b} This includes 150,000 Turkish nationals, 300,000 Turkish Cypriots, and also smaller Turkish minorities such as Bulgarian Turks and Romanian Turks.

British Turks (Turkish: Britanyalı Türkler) or Turks in the United Kingdom (Turkish: Birleşik Krallık'taki Türkler) are Turkish people who have immigrated to the United Kingdom. However, the term may also refer to British-born persons who have Turkish parents or who have a Turkish ancestral background.

Turks first began to emigrate in large numbers from Northern Cyprus for work and then again when Turkish Cypriots were forced to leave their homes during the Cyprus conflict. Turks then began to come from Turkey for economic reasons. Recently, smaller groups of Turks have begun to immigrate to the United Kingdom from other European countries.

As of 2011, there was a total of about 500,000 people of Turkish origin in the UK, made up of approximately 150,000 Turkish nationals and about 300,000 Turkish Cypriots. Furthermore, in recent years, there has been a growing number of ethnic Turks immigrating to the United Kingdom from Algeria and Germany. Many other Turks have immigrated to Britain from parts of the southern Balkans where they form an ethnic and religious minority dating to the early Ottoman period, particularly Bulgaria, Romania, the Republic of North Macedonia, and the province of East Macedonia and Thrace in Northern Greece.

== History ==
=== Ottoman migration ===
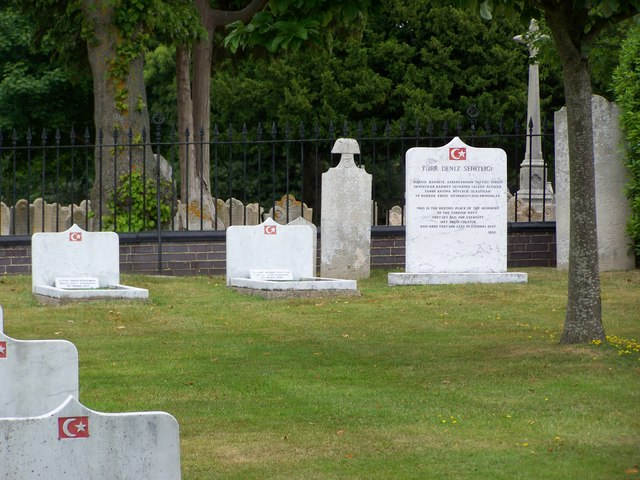
Ottoman Turkish graves in a segregated part of Clayhall Road cemetery

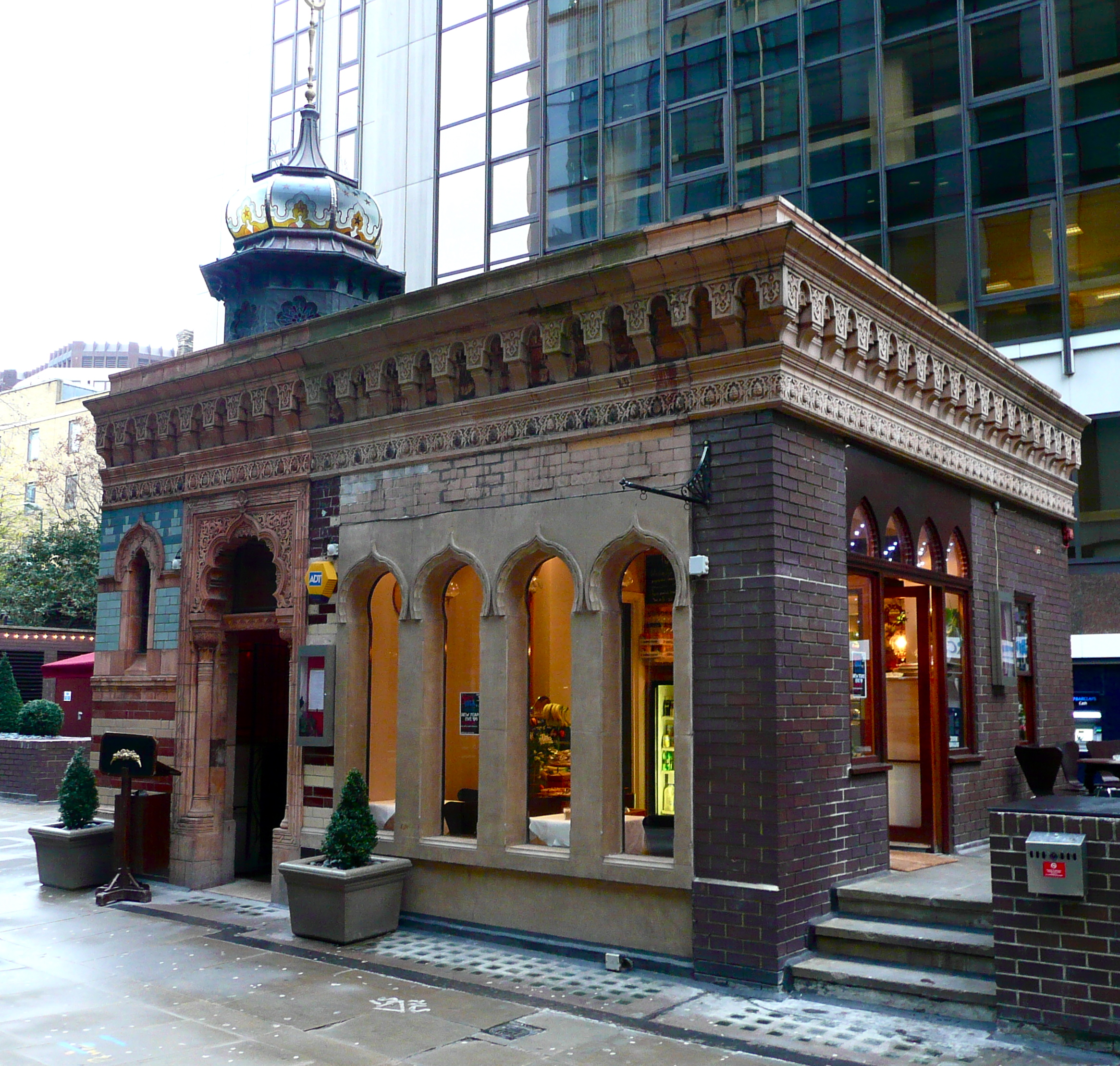
One of Nevill's London Victorian Turkish baths built in 1895. It closed in 1954.

The first Turks settled in the United Kingdom during the sixteenth and seventeenth centuries. Between the years 1509-1547 Turks were counted among Henry VIII's mercenary troops as the Tudor monarch was known to make heavy use of foreign troops. By the late sixteenth century hundreds of Turks were to be found in England who were freed from galley slavery on Spanish ships by English pirates. It is believed that the release of Turkish slaves from Spanish ships were for political reasons. At the time, England was vulnerable to attacks from the Spanish Empire, and Queen Elizabeth I wanted to cultivate good relations with the Ottoman Empire as a means of resisting the Spanish military. The Turkish slaves who had not yet returned to the Ottoman Empire requested assistance from London merchants trading in North Africa during the times of war between England and Spain, or England and France. Those who decided not to return to their country converted to Christianity and settled in England.

The first ever documented Muslim who arrived in England was in the mid-1580s, is believed to be a Turk born in Negropont. He was captured by William Hawkins aboard a Spanish ship and brought to England. The Turk was known as Chinano, assumed to come from the name Sinan, and converted to Anglicanism in October 1586. Once baptised, he was given the Christian name of William. Two decades later, an allowance of 6 pence per diem was paid to a Turkish captive who embraced Christianity in England and assumed the name John Baptista. Between the years 1624-1628 Salleman Alexander, ‘Richard a poore Turk’ and another unnamed Turk were also baptized in London. Thus, by 1627, there were close to 40 Muslims living in London alone, most of which were Turks. One of the most famous Muslim converts to Christianity was Iusuf (Yusuf), ‘the Turkish Chaous’ (çavuş), who was born in Constantinople. Baptised on 30 January 1658, his conversion is deemed significant because Iusuf served as an ambassador for the Ottoman Sultan.

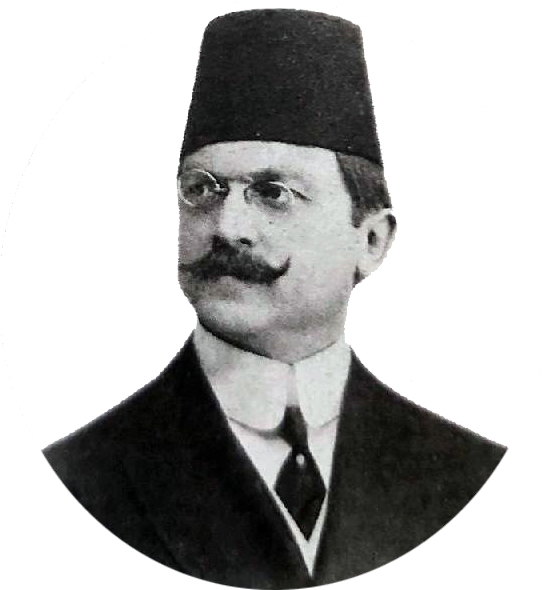
Ali Kemal Bey was an Ottoman Turkish journalist and politician who fled to the UK. His great-grandson Boris Johnson became the British prime minister.

By the early 1650s, an English merchant who had been trading in the Ottoman Empire returned to London with a Turkish servant who introduced the making of Turkish coffee, and by 1652 the first coffee house had opened in London; within a decade, more than 80 establishments flourished in the city. In 1659, Yusuf, an Ottoman administrator from Negropont, was baptized in England and took the name Richard Christophilus. With the influx of Muslim merchants and diplomats into England due to improved Anglo-Ottoman relations, a race for Muslim converts began between the Cromwellian party and the Anglicans. By 1679, Britain saw its first ever hamam (Ottoman bathhouse) opened in London. Once George I became King of England in 1714, he took with him from Hanover his two Turkish protégés, Mustafa and Mehmet. Mehmet's mother and Mustafa's son would also reside in England. Due to their prominence in the court, Mustafa and Mehmet were depicted in the murals of Kensington Palace. In 1716 King George I ennobled Mehmet, who adopted the surname von Königstreu (true to the king).

Ottoman Turkish migration continued after the Anglo-Ottoman Treaty of 1799. In the years 1820–22, the Ottoman Empire exported goods worth £650,000 to the United Kingdom. By 1836–38, that figure had reached £1,729,000 with many Ottoman merchants entering the country. In 1839, the Ottoman Tanzimat reform movement began. This period saw rapid changes in Ottoman administration including numerous high-ranking officials receiving their higher education and postings in the Western nations. Rashid Pasha (1800–1858) served as the Ottoman ambassador to Paris and London in the 1830s. One of his disciples and future grand vizier of the Ottoman Empire, Ali Pasha (1815–1871), also served as ambassador to London in the 1840s. Fuad Pasha (1815–1869), also received appointment at the Ottoman London embassy before rising in public office in his own nation.

In 1865 Ottoman intellectuals had established the Young Ottomans organisation in order to resist the absolutism of Abdulaziz. Many of these intellectuals escaped to London (and to Paris) in June 1867 where they were able to freely express their views by criticising the Ottoman regime in newspapers. Their successors, the Young Turks, also took refuge in London in order to escape the absolutism of Abdul Hamid II. Even more political refugees were to arrive after the Young Turk Revolution of July 1908 and after the First World War.

=== Turkish Cypriot migration ===
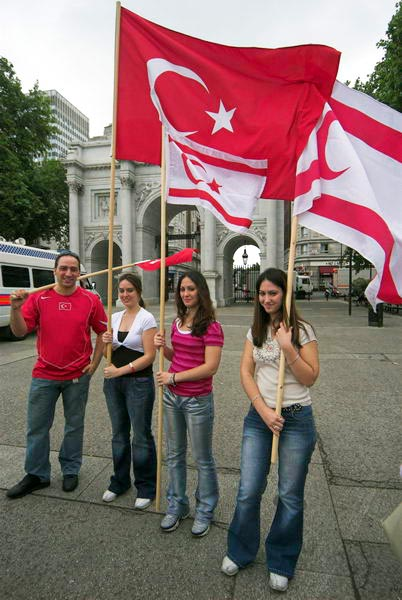
Turkish Cypriots in London

Migration from Cyprus to the United Kingdom began in the early 1920s when the British annexed Cyprus in 1914 and the residents of Cyprus became subjects of the Crown. Many Turkish Cypriots went to the United Kingdom as students and tourists whilst others left the island due to the harsh economic and political life on the island leading to lack of job opportunities. Turkish Cypriot emigration to the United Kingdom continued to increase when the Great Depression of 1929 brought economic depression to Cyprus, with unemployment and low wages being a significant issue. During the Second World War, the number of Turkish run cafes increased from 20 in 1939 to 200 in 1945 which created a demand for more Turkish Cypriot workers. Thus, throughout the 1950s, Turkish Cypriots began to emigrate to the United Kingdom for economic reasons and by 1958 the number of Turkish Cypriots was estimated to be 8,500. Their numbers increased each year as rumours about immigration restrictions appeared in much of the Cypriot media.

As the island of Cyprus' independence was approaching, Turkish Cypriots felt vulnerable as they had cause for concern about the political future of the island. This was first evident when Greek Cypriots held a referendum in 1950 in which 95.7% of eligible Greek Cypriot voters cast their ballots in supporting a fight aimed at uniting Cyprus with Greece. Thus, the 1950s saw the arrival of many Turkish Cypriots to the United Kingdom who were fleeing the EOKA terrorists and its aim of Enosis. Once Cyprus became an independent state in 1960, inter-ethnic fighting broke out in 1963, and by 1964 some 25,000 Turkish Cypriots became internally displaced, accounting to about a fifth of their population. Thus, the oppression which the Turkish Cypriots suffered during the mid-1960s led to many of them emigrating to the United Kingdom. Furthermore, Turkish Cypriots continued to emigrate to the United Kingdom during this time due to the economic gap which was widening in Cyprus. The Greek Cypriots were increasingly taking control of the country's major institutions causing the Turkish Cypriots to become economically disadvantaged. Thus, the political and economic unrest in Cyprus after 1964 sharply increased the number of Turkish Cypriot immigrants to the United Kingdom.

Many of these early migrants worked in the clothing industry in London, where both men and women could work together- sewing was a skill which the community had already acquired in Cyprus. Turkish Cypriots were concentrated mainly in the north-east of London and specialised in the heavy-wear sector, such as coats and tailored garments. This sector offered work opportunities where poor knowledge of the English language was not a problem and where self-employment was a possibility.

By the late 1960s, approximately 60,000 Turkish Cypriots were forcefully moved into enclaves in Cyprus. Evidently, this period in Cypriot history resulted in an exodus of more Turkish Cypriots. The overwhelming majority migrated to the United Kingdom, whilst others went to Turkey, North America and Australia. Once the Greek military junta rose to power in 1967, they staged a coup d'état in 1974 against the Cypriot President, with the help of EOKA B, to unite the island with Greece. This led to a military offensive by Turkey who divided the island. By 1983, the Turkish Cypriots declared their own state, the Turkish Republic of Northern Cyprus (TRNC), which has since remained internationally unrecognised except by Turkey. The division of the island led to an economic embargo against the Turkish Cypriots by the Greek Cypriot controlled Government of Cyprus. This had the effect of depriving the Turkish Cypriots of foreign investment, aid and export markets; thus, it caused the Turkish Cypriot economy to remain stagnant and undeveloped. Due to these economic and political issues, an estimated 130,000 Turkish Cypriots have emigrated from Northern Cyprus since its establishment to the United Kingdom.

Many Turkish Cypriots emigrated to the United Kingdom with their extended families and/or brought their parents over shortly after their arrival to prevent the breakup of the family unit. These parents played a valuable role in giving support at home by looking after their grandchildren, whilst their children were working. The majority of these people are now of pensionable age, with little English language skills, given their lack of formal education and their insulation within the Turkish Cypriot community.

Finally, there is a small third group of settlers who came to the UK for educational purposes, and who then settled, in some cases being ‘overstayers’ and took up professional posts. Many of these people, as well as the second and third generation educated descendants of earlier settlers, are the initiators of the voluntary groups and organisations, which give support and advice to Turkish speaking people living in England – mainly in London and the surrounding areas.

=== Mainland Turkish migration ===
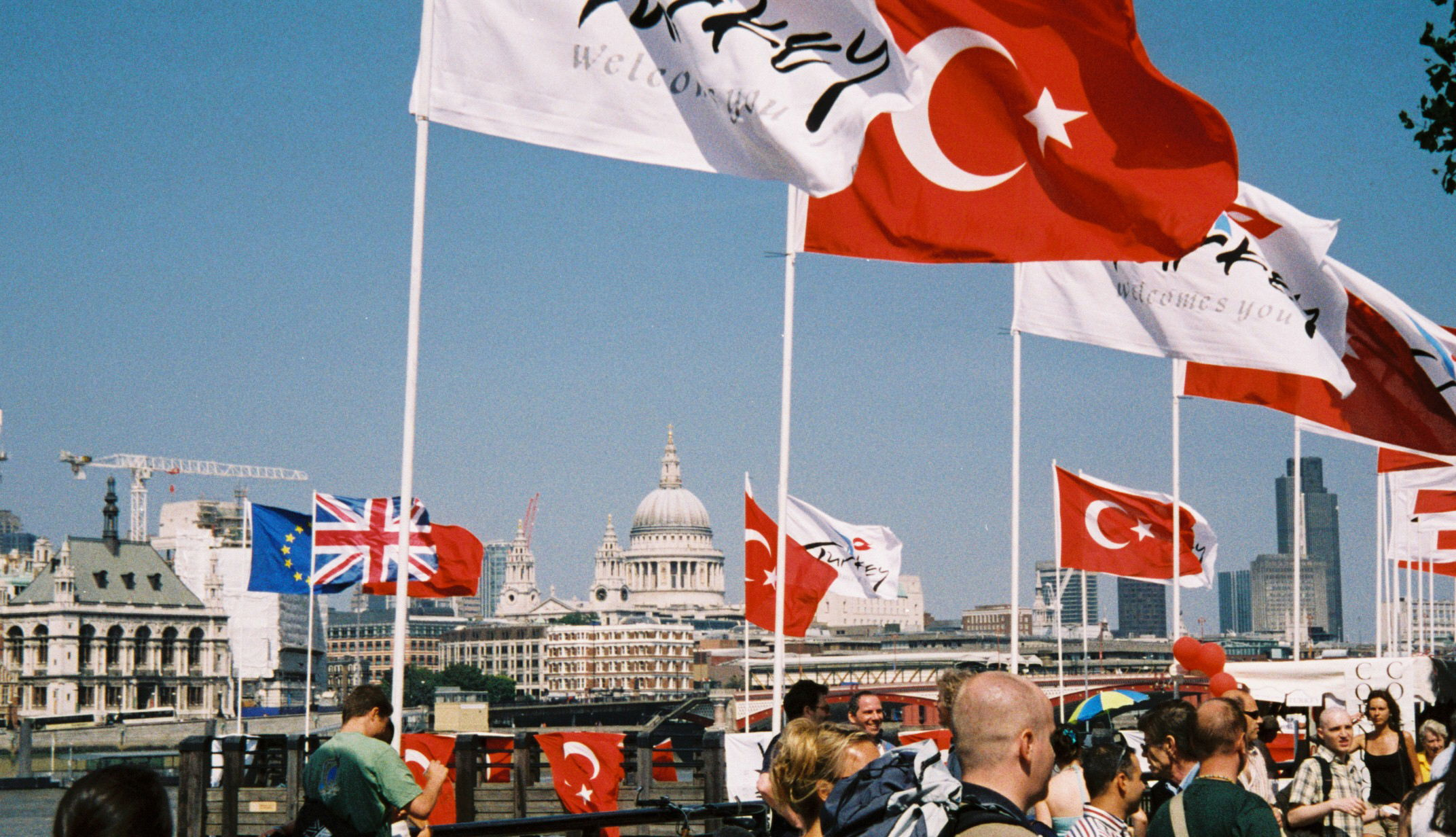
A Turkish festival in the City of London

Migration from the Republic of Turkey to the United Kingdom began when migrant workers arrived during the 1970s and were then followed by their families during the late 1970s and 1980s. Many of these workers were recruited by Turkish Cypriots who had already established businesses such as restaurants. These workers were required to renew their work permits every year until they became residents after living in the country for five years. The majority who entered the United Kingdom in the 1970s were mainly from rural areas of Turkey. However, in the 1980s, intellectuals, including students, and highly educated professionals arrived in the United Kingdom, most of which received support from the Turkish Cypriot community. Mainland Turks settled in similar areas of London in which the Turkish Cypriots lived in; however, many have also moved to the outer districts such as Enfield and Essex.

=== Migration from other countries ===
More recently, ethnic Turks from traditional areas of Turkish settlement, especially from Europe, have emigrated to the United Kingdom. There is a growing number of Algerian Turks, Bulgarian Turks, Macedonian Turks, Romanian Turks and Western Thrace Turks from the province of East Macedonia and Thrace in Northern Greece now residing in the United Kingdom. Furthermore, there is also an increasing number of Turkish families arriving from German-speaking countries (especially German Turks and Dutch Turks).

== Demographics ==
=== Population ===
A map of Turkish people in London. Over 70% of British Turks live in London. 0.0%-0.49% 0.5%-0.99% 1%-1.99% 2%-3.49% 3.5%-4.99% 5% and greater

There is an estimated 500,000 people of Turkish origin living in the United Kingdom. The Turkish community is made up of about 300,000 Turkish Cypriots, 150,000 Turkish nationals, and smaller groups of Bulgarian Turks, Macedonian Turks, Romanian Turks and Western Thrace Turks. There is also an increasing number of Turks arriving from German-speaking countries (mainly German Turks and Dutch Turks).

==== Turkish Cypriot population ====
Between 100,000 and 150,000 Turkish Cypriots have immigrated to the United Kingdom. According to the Department for Communities and Local Government and the Turkish consulate, 130,000 nationals of the Turkish Republic of Northern Cyprus have immigrated to the United Kingdom; however, this does not include Turkish Cypriots who have emigrated from the Republic of Cyprus or British-born Turkish Cypriots. In May 2001, the TRNC Ministry of Foreign Affairs said that about 200,000 Turkish Cypriots were living in the United Kingdom. In 2011, the Home Affairs Committee stated that there are now 300,000 Turkish Cypriots living in the United Kingdom. The "Kıbrıs Gazetesi", in 2008, claimed that 280,000 Turkish Cypriots were living in London alone. Furthermore, an article by Armin Laschet suggests that the British-Turkish Cypriot community now numbers 350,000 whilst some Turkish Cypriot sources suggest that they have a total population of 400,000 living in the United Kingdom.

==== Mainland Turkish population ====
According to the Office for National Statistics, the estimated number of British residents born in Turkey was 72,000 in 2009, compared to the 54,079 recorded by the 2001 UK Census. The Home Office and the Turkish consulate in London both claim that there are approximately 150,000 Turkish nationals living in the United Kingdom. Academic sources suggest that the Turkey-born population is made up of 60,000 to 100,000 ethnic Turks and 25,000 to 50,000 ethnic Kurds. However, the Department for Communities and Local Government suggests that the Kurdish community in the UK is about 50,000, among which Iraqi Kurds make up the largest group, exceeding the numbers from Turkey and Iran. The Atatürk Thought Association claims that 300,000 people of Turkish origin (not including Turkish Cypriots) are living in the UK. By 2005, The Independent newspaper reported that one gang alone had illegally smuggled up to 100,000 Turks into the UK. In 2011, the Turkish Ministry of Foreign Affairs, Ahmet Davutoğlu, claimed that there were almost 400,000 Turkish citizens living in the United Kingdom.

==== Other Turkish populations ====
There is a growing number of Turks from countries other than Cyprus and Turkey who have emigrated to the United Kingdom, mainly from Algeria, Bulgaria, Germany, Greece, Macedonia and Romania. These populations, which have different nationalities (i.e. Algerian, Bulgarian, German, Greek, Macedonian or Romanian citizenship), share the same ethnic, linguistic, cultural and religious origins as the Turks and Turkish Cypriots and are thus part of the Turkish-speaking community of the United Kingdom.

===== Bulgarian Turks =====
In 2009 the Office for National Statistics estimated that 35,000 Bulgarian-born people were resident in the UK. According to the National Statistical Institute of Bulgaria, Bulgarian Turks make up 12% of short term migration, 13% of long term migration, and 12% of the labour migration. However, the number of Bulgarian Turks in the United Kingdom may be much higher; Bulgarian citizens of Turkish origin make up entire majorities in some countries. For example, in the Netherlands Bulgarian Turks make up about 80% of Bulgarian citizens.

===== Western Thrace Turks =====
The total number of Turkish-speaking Muslims who have emigrated from Western Thrace, that is, the province of East Macedonia and Thrace in Northern Greece is unknown; however, it is estimated that 600-700 Western Thrace Turks are living in London. The number of Western Thrace Turks, as well as Pomaks from Northern Greece, living outside London or who are British-born is unknown. On 15 January 1990 the Association of Western Thrace Turks UK was established.

=== Settlement ===
The vast majority of Turkish-born people recorded in the 2001 British census lived in England, with only 471 recorded in Wales and 1,042 in Scotland. A total of 39,132 Turkish-born people were recorded in London. The 2001 census also shows that the Cyprus-born population (which includes both Turkish and Greek Cypriots) live in similar areas to the Turkish-born population. The majority live in England, with only 1,001 in Wales, and 1,533 in Scotland. A total of 45,887 were recorded in London. However, official data regarding the British Turkish community excludes British-born and dual heritage children of Turkish origin; thus, it is unlikely that any of the official figures available provide a true indication of the community.

Turks from the same villages and districts from their homeland tend to congregate in the same quarters in the UK. Many of the Turkish-speaking communities have successfully settled in different parts of the capital, notably in Hackney and Haringey, but also in Enfield, Lewisham, Lambeth, Southwark, Croydon, Islington, Kensington, Waltham Forest, and Wood Green. The majority of the Turkish population live in Hackney, and they are mainly Turkish Cypriot. Turkish-speaking communities are located in all parts of the Borough, though there is a greater concentration in North and Central parts of the Borough. Stoke Newington, Newington Green and Dalston have the greatest concentration of population and in particular along Green Lanes, running from Manor House down to Newington Green Roundabout.

According to the Department for Communities and Local Government, outside London there are smaller Turkish communities in Birmingham, Hertfordshire, Luton, Manchester, Sheffield and the East Midlands (mostly Leicester and Nottingham). At the time of the 2001 census, only two census tracts outside London were home to more than 100 Turkish-born residents: south Cheshunt in Hertfordshire and Clifton in Nottingham. As for the Cypriot-born residents, two areas of Manchester – Stretford and Moss Side – have the largest Cyprus-born (regardless of ethnicity) clusters outside London.

Religion of Turkish born - England and Wales
Religion	Census 2011		Census 2021	
Religion	Number	%	Number	%
Islam	66,499	73.0%	67,918	53.2%
No religion	12,937	14.2%	27,728	21.7%
Other Religions	173	0.2%	16,988	13.3%
Christianity	2,674	2.9%	2,141	1.7%
Judaism	272	0.3%	381	0.3%
Buddhism	74	0.1%	103	0.1%
Sikhism	40	0.0%	18	0.0%
Hinduism	26	0.0%	17	0.0%
Not stated	8,420	9.2%	12,351	9.7%
Total	91,115	100%	127,645	100%

== Culture ==
Traditional family values are considered to be very important for the Turkish community. Marriage in particular is seen as an important part of their social sphere, and considerable social pressure is put onto single Turks to get married. Thus, getting married and having a family is a significant part of their Turkish identity. Turkish parents consistently try to hold onto the cultural values in order to 'protect' these traditional values onto the younger generation. Young Turks from a very young age are encouraged to attend Turkish school to learn about the Turkish culture including folk dances, food, history and the language. The first generation generally maintains their culture rather than adopting the British social and cultural values. However, the younger generations have a desire to preserve parental values at home and to adopt some elements of the host culture outside the home.

=== Language ===
The Turkish language is the main language spoken among the community in the United Kingdom, but a Turkish Cypriot dialect is also widely spoken amongst its community. The first generation and recent migrants often speak fluent Turkish and women within the community are particularly constrained by language limitations.

A new Turkish language, Anglo-Turkish or also referred to as Turklish, has been forming amongst the second and third generations, where the English language and the Turkish language is used interchangeably in the same sentences.

=== Religion ===
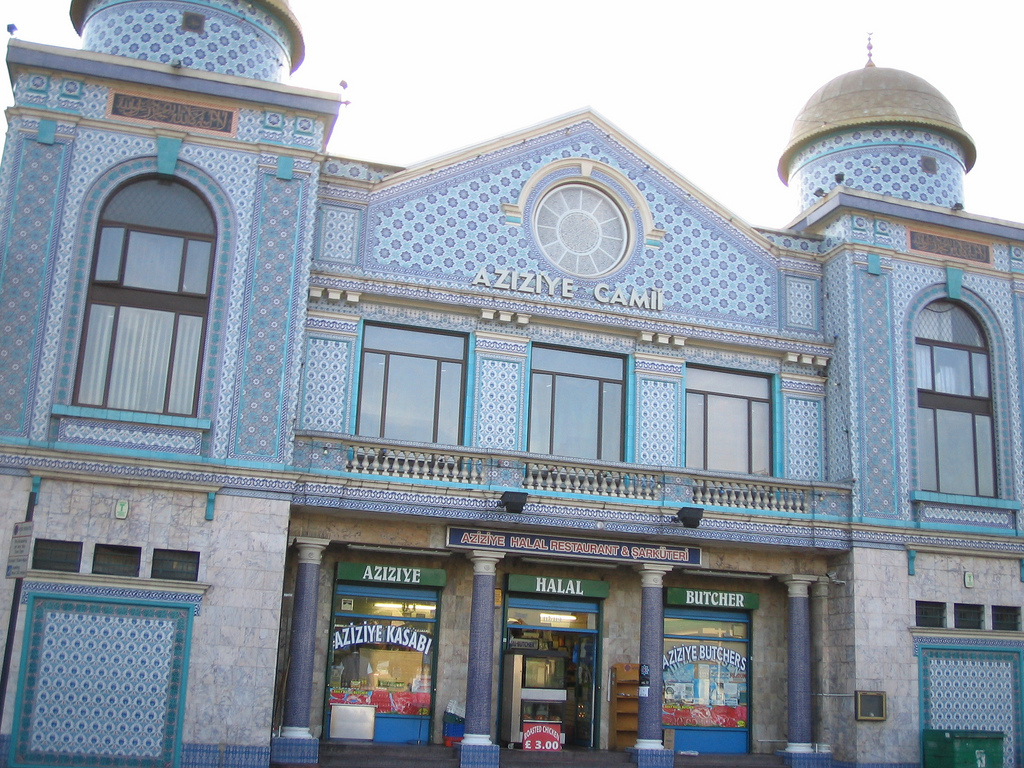
Aziziye Mosque in Stoke Newington, London

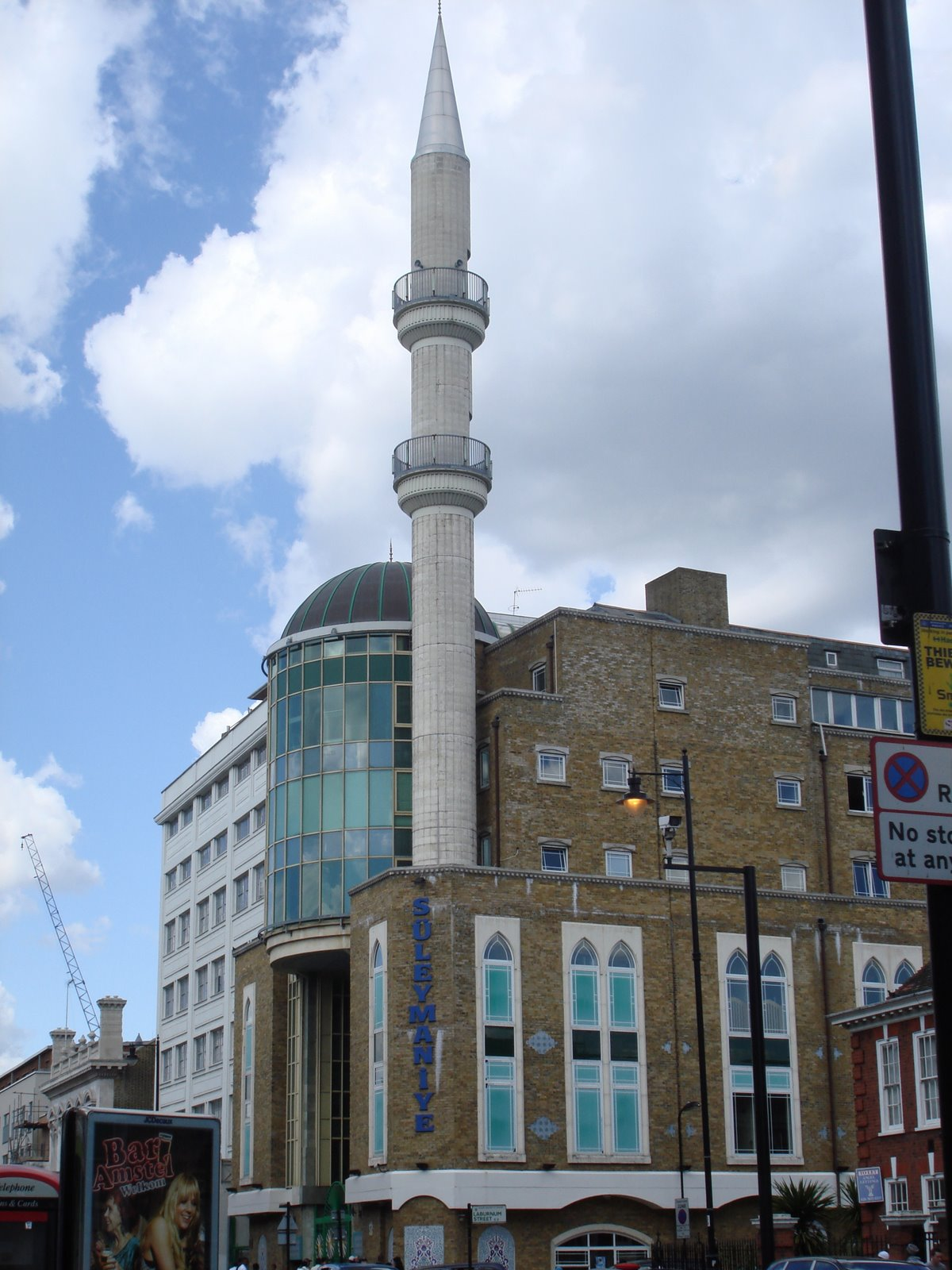
Suleymaniye Mosque in Dalston, London

The vast majority of the Turkish community are Sunni Muslims, whilst the remaining people generally do not have any religious affiliation. Nonetheless, even those who define themselves as not being religious feel that Islam has had an influence of their Turkish identity. There is mostly a lack of knowledge about the basic principles of Islam within the younger generations. The young generation of the community tends to have little knowledge about their religion and generally do not fulfill all religious duties. However, the majority of young Turks still believe in Islam and the basic principles of the religion as it has more of a symbolic attachment to them due to traditional Turkish values.

In recent years there has also been a strong movement towards religion by the community with the growth of Islamic organisations. The desire to retain an identity has increased the strength of Islam among the communities. Clinging to traditions is seen as a way of maintaining culture and identity. Nonetheless, young Turkish Muslims are brought up in a more liberal home environment than other British Muslims. Thus, there are many Turks, especially the younger generations, who do not abstain from eating non-halal food or drinking alcohol, whilst still identifying as Muslim.

The establishment of mosques has always been considered a priority within the Turkish community. The first Turkish mosque, Shacklewell Lane Mosque, was established by the Turkish Cypriot community in 1977. There are numerous other Turkish Mosques in London, mainly in Hackney, that are predominantly used by the Turkish community, especially the Aziziye Mosque and Suleymaniye Mosque. Notable Turkish mosques outside London include Selimiye Mosque in Manchester, Hamidiye Mosque in Leicester, and Osmaniye Mosque in Stoke-on-Trent. During the Turkish invasion into Syria in 2019, adherents prayed for the Turkish army in a mosque under the guidance of the Turkish Directorate of Religious Affairs. As of 2018 there were 17 mosques under the control of the Directorate of Religious affairs.

Activities are held in many Turkish mosques in order to retain an Islamic identity and to pass these traditional values onto the younger generation. These mosques have introduced new policies and strategies within their establishments as they have recognised that traditional methods are not very productive within the British context. For example, one mosque has opened an independent primary school whilst another has been granted permission to register weddings in its mosque. Other mosques have even allowed the formation of small market places.

== Politics ==
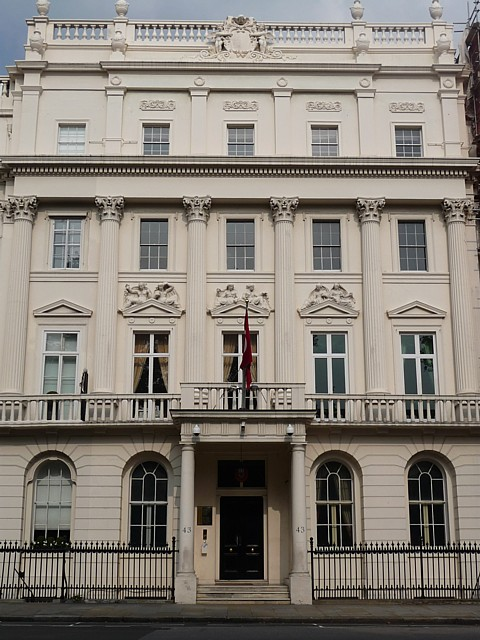
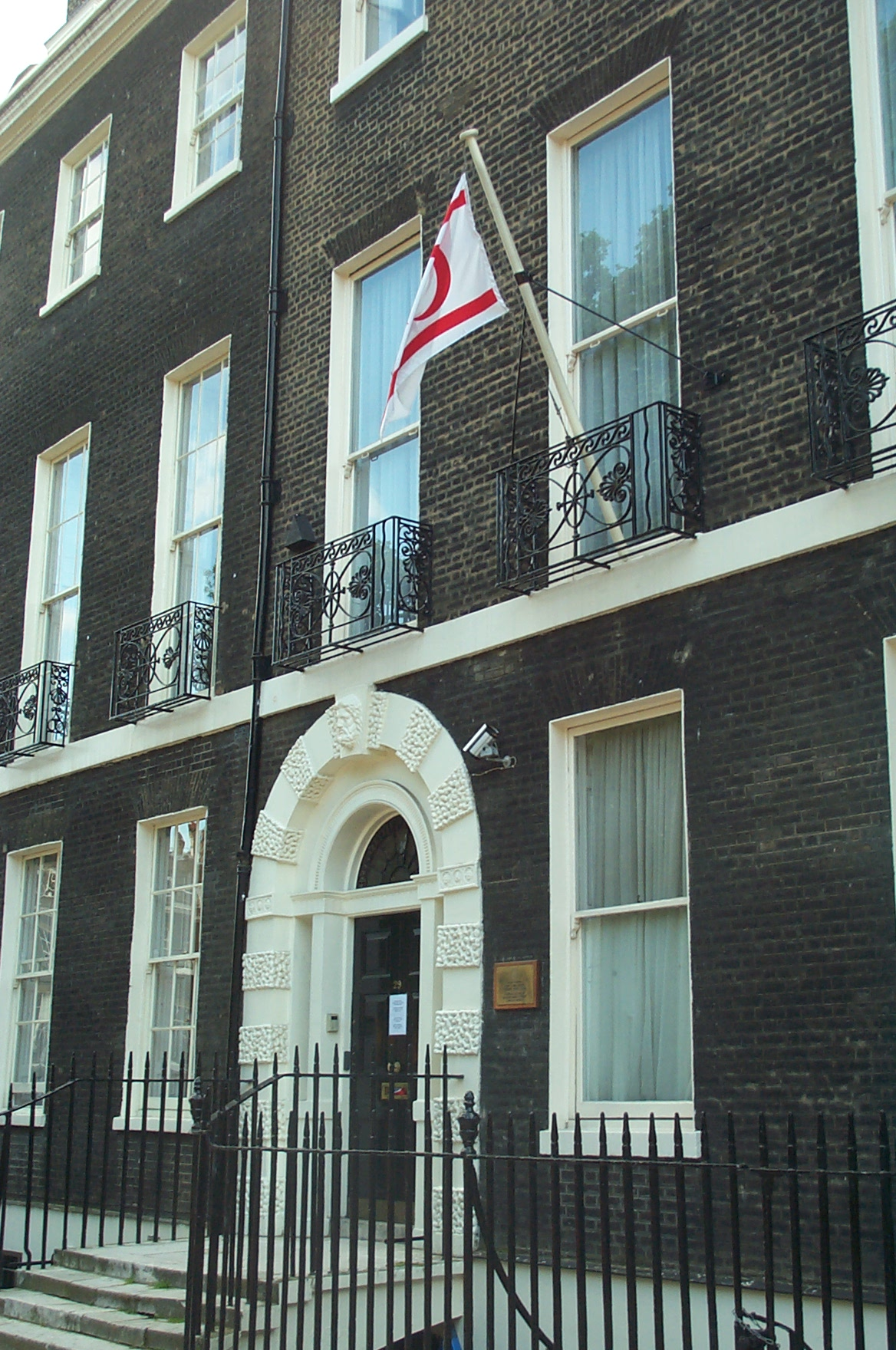
The Turkish Embassy located in Belgrave Square (left) and the London office of the Turkish Republic of Northern Cyprus in Bedford Square (right).

=== Diplomatic missions ===
In 1793, Sultan Selim III established the first Ottoman embassy in London, with its first ambassador being Yusuf Ağa Efendi. This marked the establishment of mutual diplomatic relations between the British and the Ottoman Turks. By 1834, a permanent embassy was established by Sultan Mahmud II. Today the current Turkish Embassy is located at 43 Belgrave Square, London. There is also a Turkish Cypriot Embassy which represents nationals of Northern Cyprus located at 29 Bedford Square, London.

=== Cyprus issue ===
Due to the large Turkish Cypriot diaspora in the United Kingdom, the Cyprus dispute has become an important political issue in the United Kingdom. Turkish Cypriots carry out numerous activities such as lobbying in British politics. Organisations were first set up during the 1950s and 1960s mainly by Turkish Cypriot students who had met and studied in cities in Turkey, such as Istanbul and Ankara, before moving to the United Kingdom. Organisations such as the "Turkish Cypriot Association were originally set up to preserve the communities culture and provide meeting places. However, during the 1960s, when political violence increased in Cyprus, these organisations centred more on politics.

Turkish Cypriot organisations which engage in the Cyprus issue can be divided into two main groups: there are those who support the TRNC government, and those who oppose it. Both groups back up their lobbying by supporting British (and European) politicians. The general impression is that the majority of British Turkish Cypriots are mainly conservative supporters of a Turkish Cypriot state and lobby for its recognition. British Turkish Cypriots cannot vote in Cypriot elections; therefore, Turkish Cypriot organisations have tended to take an active role in political affairs by providing economic support for political parties.

There are also campaigns which are directed at the wider British population and politicians. Yearly demonstrations occur to commemorate historical important days; for example, each year on 20 July, a pro-TRNC organisation arranges a demonstration from Trafalgar Square to the Turkish Embassy in Belgrave Square. 15 November is another date in which public places are used to voice political issues regarding the Cyprus dispute.

=== Politicians ===
British political figures of Turkish descent include: Boris Johnson, who has served as Mayor of London, foreign secretary and was formerly the prime minister of the United Kingdom and whose great-grandfather was Turkish (although he was half Circassian origin); Baroness Meral Hussein-Ece, the first woman of Turkish Cypriot origin to be a member of the House of Lords; Nesil Caliskan, the first member of the House of Commons of Turkish Cypriot origin, who has served as MP for Barking since 2024; and Alp Mehmet, a diplomat who retired in 2009 as the British ambassador to Iceland.

== Media ==
=== Turkish television programmes ===
- Euro Genc TV

=== Turkish magazines ===
- BritishTurks.com
- Haberingiltere.co.uk
- AdaAktüel Magazine
- BN Magazine
- T-VINE Magazine

=== Turkish newspapers ===
- Avrupa Gazete
- London Turkish Gazette
- Olay Gazetesi
- Toplum Postası

=== Turkish radio ===
- Bizim FM

=== Turkish film ===
- London Turkish Film Festival

== See also ==
- List of British Turks
- Turks in London
- Turkey – United Kingdom relations
- Turks in Ireland
- Turks in Europe
- Britons in Turkey
- Byerley Turk
- Fordingbridge Turks football club, established in 1868 and named after Turks
