= Demographics of Liverpool =

- Population pyramid of Liverpool
- Population: 466,400 (2011)

Nationality
- Major ethnic: White: 84.0%

Liverpool is a city in the English county of Merseyside. With a population of around 496,784, Liverpool is the largest settlement in the region and the sixth largest in the United Kingdom.

== Definitions ==
Liverpool can refer to the city of Liverpool. It can also refer to the two other larger areas, the Liverpool City Region and the Liverpool Urban Area, and sometimes to the county of Merseyside.

The Liverpool Urban Area encompasses the city of Liverpool alongside Sefton, Knowsley, St. Helens and Ashton-in-Makerfield had a population of 864,122 in 2011, which ranks sixth out of all UK conurbations.

The Liverpool City Region is made up of Liverpool alongside the Metropolitan Boroughs of Halton, Knowsley, Sefton, St Helens, and the Wirral. Liverpool City Region had an estimated population of 1,554,642 in 2019.

Unless otherwise stated, statistics in this article refer to the City of Liverpool.

== Population change ==
Population of Liverpool, 1801–2011

As with other major British cities, Liverpool has a large and very diverse population. In the 2011 UK Census, the recorded population of Liverpool was 466,400, a 5.5% increase from the 435,500 recorded in the 2001 census. Liverpool's population peaked in the 1930s with 846,101 recorded in the 1931 census. Until the recent increase, the city had experienced negative population growth every decade; at its peak, over 100,000 people had left the city between 1971 and 1981. Between 2001 and 2006, the city experienced the ninth largest population percentage loss of any UK unitary authority.

In common with many cities, Liverpool's population is younger than that of England as a whole, with 42.3% of its population under the age of 30, compared to an English average of 37.4%. Those of working age make up 65.1% of the population.

Industry sectors of Liverpool over time

== Ethnicity ==
Ethnic makeup of Liverpool by single year ages in 2021

Liverpool is home to Britain's oldest black community, dating to at least the 1730s, and some Liverpudlians are able to trace their black ancestors in the city back ten generations. Early black settlers in the city included seamen, the children of traders sent to be educated, and freed slaves (since slaves entering the country after 1722 were deemed free men).

The city is also home to the oldest Chinese community in Europe; the first residents of the city's Chinatown arrived as seamen in the 19th century.

The city is also historically known for its large Irish and Welsh populations. The Liverpool accent (Scouse) is thought to have been influenced by the arrival of Irish and Welsh immigrants. The influences of Irish and Welsh culture have given Liverpool's people traits usually associated with the Celtic fringes of the British Isles.

The vast majority of Liverpool's ethnic minorities live within the inner city area, particularly in and around Toxteth. According to the 2001 census, 38% of the population of Granby, 37% of Princes Park, and 27% of Central were from ethnic groups other than White British.

=== Census data ===
Ethnic Group	1991		2001		2011		2021	
Ethnic Group	Number	%	Number	%	Number	%	Number	%
White: Total	435,404	96.23%	414,526	94.32%	414,671	88.91%	408,443	84.03%
White: British	–	–	403,625	91.84%	395,485	84.79%	375,785	77.31%
White: Irish	5,813	1.28%	5,349	1.21%	6,729	1.44%	6,826	1.40%
White: Gypsy or Irish Traveller (Note: New category created for the 2011 census)	–	–	–	–	185	0.04%	501	0.10%
White: Roma (Note: New category created for the 2021 census)	–	–	–	–			1,169	0.24%
White: Other	–	–	5,552	1.26%	12,272	2.63%	24,162	4.97%
Asian or Asian British: Total	6,358	1.41%	9,962	2.26%	19,403	4.16%	27,767	5.71%
Asian or Asian British: Bangladeshi	395	0.09%	557	0.12%	1,075	0.23%	1,917	0.39%
Asian or Asian British: Chinese (Note: In 2001, listed under the 'Chinese or other ethnic group' heading.)	3,337	0.73%	5,143	1.17%	7,978	1.71%	8,841	1.82%
Asian or Asian British: Indian	1,295	0.28%	1,909	0.43%	4,915	1.05%	6,251	1.29%
Asian or Asian British: Pakistani	630	0.14%	1,050	0.23%	1,999	0.42%	3,673	0.76%
Asian or Asian British: Other Asian	701	0.15%	1,303	0.29%	3,436	0.73%	7,085	1.46%
Black or Black British: Total	7,247	1.60%	5,377	1.22%	12,308	2.63%	16,964	3.49%
Black or Black British: Caribbean	1,495	0.33%	1,083	0.24%	1,467	0.31%	1,493	0.31%
Black or Black British: African	2,487	0.54%	3,071	0.69%	8,490	1.82%	12,709	2.61%
Black or Black British: Other Black	3,265	0.72%	1,223	0.27%	2,351	0.50%	2,762	0.57%
Mixed: Total	–	–	7,907	1.79%	11,756	2.52%	16,880	3.47%
Mixed: White and Black Caribbean	–	–	2,308	0.52%	3,473	0.74%	4,127	0.85%
Mixed: White and Black African	–	–	2,207	0.50%	3,164	0.67%	4,157	0.86%
Mixed: White and Asian	–	–	1,352	0.31%	2,283	0.48%	3,662	0.75%
Mixed: Other Mixed	–	–	2,040	0.46%	2,836	0.61%	4,934	1.02%
Other: Total	3,441	0.76%	1,701	0.38%	8,277	1.77%	16,034	3.30%
Other: Arab	–	–	–	–	5,629	1.21%	8,312	1.71%
Other: Any other ethnic group	3,441	0.76%	1,701	0.38%	2,648	0.56%	7,722	1.59%
Total	452,450	100%	439,473	100%	466,415	100%	486,088	100%

Per the above table, note that the census question regarding ethnicity was first asked in 1991.

=== Ethnicity of school pupils ===
This table shows the ethnicity of school children in Liverpool in the academic years from 2015/16 onwards.

Ethnic group	School year																	
Ethnic group	2015/16		2016/17		2017/18 (Note: Before this school year, ethnicity was only recorded for compulsory school age children. This means the numbers from the previous two years are not comparable with this year as well as following years- percentage should be used as a more accurate comparison if needed)		2018/19		2019/20		2020/21		2021/22		2022/23		2023/24	
Ethnic group	Number	%	Number	%	Number	%	Number	%	Number	%	Number	%	Number	%	Number	%	Number	%
White: Total	49,302	82.0%	49,653	81.2%	57,744	79.9%	58,002	79.1%	58,396	78.3%	58,423	77.6%	58,538	76.2%	58,242	74.9%	57,324	72.9%
White: British	46,441	77.3%	46,500	76.1%	53,627	74.2%	53,473	72.9%	53,635	71.9%	53,606	71.2%	53,493	69.6%	52,960	68.1%	51,971	66.1%
White: Irish	200	0.3%	212	0.3%	272	0.4%	285	0.4%	284	0.4%	284	0.4%	310	0.4%	307	0.4%	296	0.4%
White: Roma	60	0.1%	67	0.1%	127	0.2%	179	0.2%	219	0.3%	172	0.2%	228	0.3%	248	0.3%	263	0.3%
White: Traveller of Irish heritage	34	0.1%	37	0.1%	56	0.1%	66	0.1%	89	0.1%	65	0.1%	73	0.1%	76	0.1%	75	0.1%
White: Any other White background	2,567	4.3%	2,837	4.6%	3,662	5.1%	3,999	5.5%	4,169	5.6%	4,296	5.7%	4,434	5.8%	4,651	6.0%	4,719	6.0%
Asian / Asian British: Total	2,924	4.9%	3,137	5.1%	3,988	5.5%	4,081	5.6%	4,200	5.6%	4,278	5.7%	4,670	6.1%	5,152	6.6%	5,603	7.1%
Asian: Indian	610	1.0%	688	1.1%	865	1.2%	892	1.2%	883	1.2%	879	1.2%	980	1.3%	1,192	1.5%	1,467	1.9%
Asian: Pakistani	398	0.7%	406	0.7%	515	0.7%	541	0.7%	594	0.8%	638	0.8%	682	0.9%	772	1.0%	835	1.1%
Asian: Bangladeshi	294	0.5%	302	0.5%	354	0.5%	364	0.5%	376	0.5%	377	0.5%	389	0.5%	409	0.5%	443	0.6%
Asian: Chinese	719	1.2%	778	1.3%	970	1.3%	1,020	1.4%	1,047	1.4%	1,012	1.3%	1,130	1.5%	1,176	1.5%	1,169	1.5%
Asian: Any other Asian background	903	1.5%	963	1.6%	1,284	1.7%	1,264	1.7%	1,300	1.7%	1,372	1.8%	1,489	1.9%	1,603	2.1%	1,689	2.1%
Black / Black British: Total	2,438	4.1%	2,590	4.2%	3,270	4.5%	3,402	4.6%	3,639	4.9%	3,802	5.1%	4,132	5.4%	4,552	5.9%	5,419	6.9%
Black: Black Caribbean	71	0.1%	92	0.2%	100	0.1%	96	0.1%	102	0.1%	104	0.1%	108	0.1%	122	0.2%	121	0.2%
Black: Black African	1,289	2.1%	1,330	2.2%	1,644	2.3%	1,809	2.5%	2,013	2.7%	2,129	2.8%	2,467	3.2%	2,904	3.7%	3,777	4.8%
Black: Any other Black background	1,078	1.8%	1,168	1.9%	1,526	2.1%	1,497	2.0%	1,524	2.0%	1,569	2.1%	1,557	2.0%	1,526	2.0%	1,521	1.9%
Mixed / British Mixed	2,996	5.0%	3,147	5.1%	3,931	5.4%	4,055	5.5%	4,189	5.6%	4,281	5.7%	4,459	5.8%	4,553	5.9%	4,727	6.0%
Mixed: White and Black Caribbean	400	0.7%	405	0.7%	478	0.7%	490	0.7%	491	0.7%	511	0.7%	561	0.7%	579	0.7%	584	0.7%
Mixed: White and Black African	527	0.9%	523	0.9%	655	0.9%	682	0.9%	675	0.9%	705	0.9%	733	1.0%	724	0.9%	780	1.0%
Mixed: White and Asian	290	0.5%	301	0.5%	377	0.5%	433	0.6%	495	0.7%	535	0.7%	592	0.8%	660	0.8%	721	0.9%
Mixed: Any other Mixed background	1,779	3.0%	1,918	3.1%	2,421	3.3%	2,450	3.3%	2,528	3.4%	2,530	3.4%	2,573	3.3%	2,590	3.3%	2,642	3.4%
Any other ethnic group	2,023	3.4%	2,144	3.5%	2,892	4.0%	3,272	4.5%	3,587	4.8%	3,766	5.0%	4,145	5.4%	4,413	5.7%	4,598	5.8%
Unclassified	419	0.7%	446	0.7%	503	0.7%	505	0.7%	581	0.8%	732	1.0%	865	1.1%	879	1.1%	1,011	1.3%
Total:	60,102	100%	61,117	100%	72,292	100%	73,317	100%	74,592	100%	75,282	100%	76,809	100%	77,791	100%	78,682	100%

=== Major ethnic and national groups ===
The largest and most significant non-English ethnic and national groups in Liverpool are listed in alphabetical order below.

==== Afro-Caribbeans ====
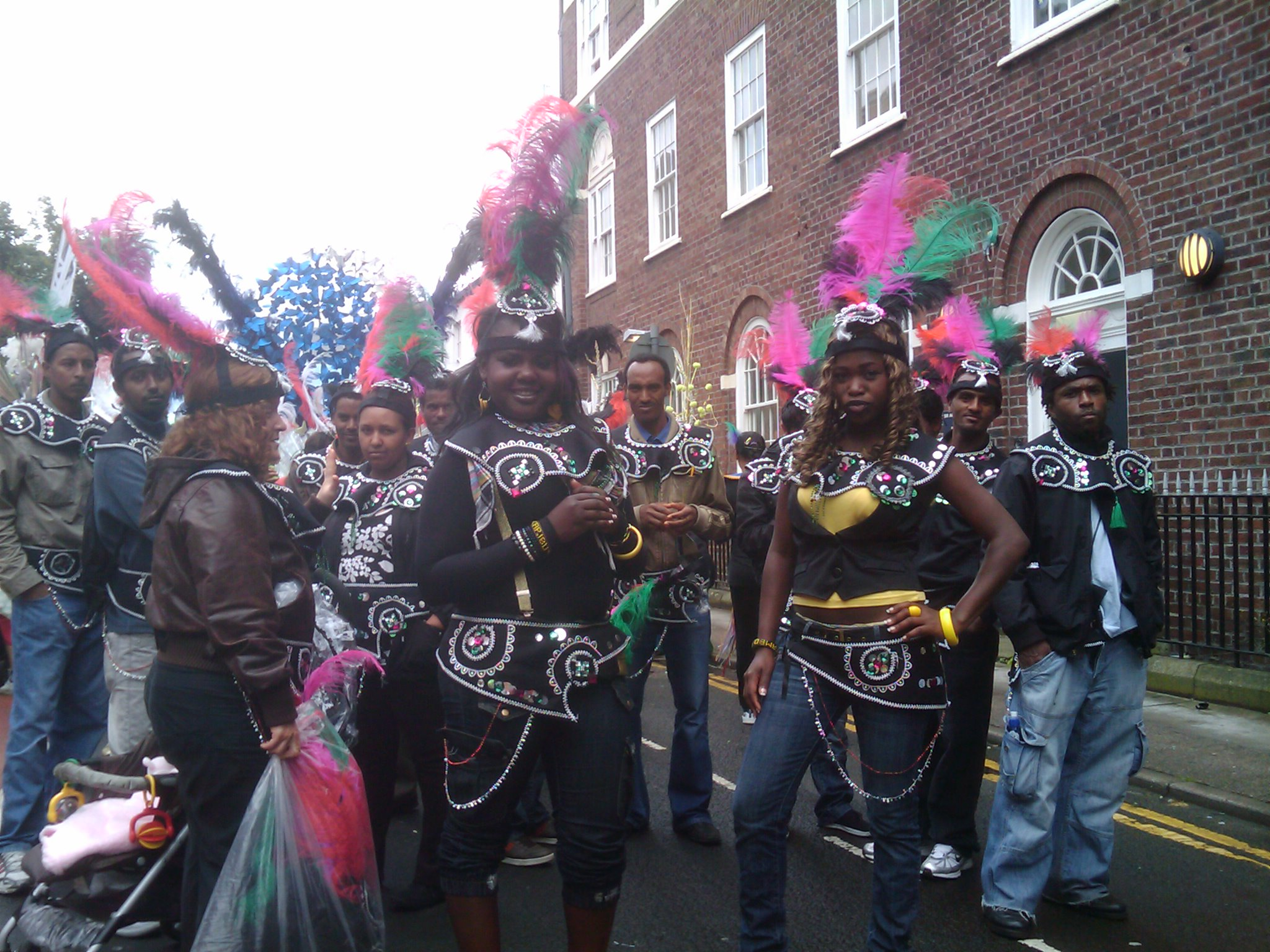
Afro-Caribbeans participants at Liverpool's International Carnival, costumes by Sunshine International Arts, participants from SOLA arts

Historically, and even today, the Afro-Caribbean population of Liverpool has been largely outnumbered by Black Africans. In 2009, just under 5,000 Liverpudlians were of Afro-Caribbean origin (most of these being of mixed White and Black origins). This is compared to the 6,900 plus individuals of full or partial Black African origin in the city. The International Organization for Migration estimates that Liverpool is home to between 1,000 and 2,000 Jamaicans, with the vast majority of these residing in Toxteth and Granby. Some Black Africans in Liverpool can trace their ancestry back to the city's links with the slave trade, whilst Afro-Caribbeans are a fairly recent and emerging ethnic group. By far the largest wave of Afro-Caribbean immigrants to the UK occurred in the 1940s and 1950s, when the British government encouraged people to come over and help contribute to the economy by taking up empty job vacancies. Despite being a relatively small community, Afro-Caribbeans have made a significant contribution to the history and culture of the city. There are numerous Afro-Caribbean-owned businesses and community centres in and around Toxteth and the Smithdown Road area.

==== Chinese ====
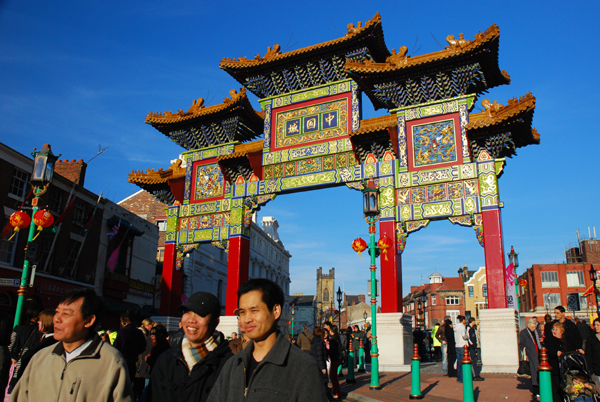
Chinatown, Liverpool

Liverpool is home to the oldest Chinese community in Europe. According to 2009 estimates, 1.1% of Liverpool's population are of Chinese ethnicity (some 5,000 people). Despite this, the IOM has estimated that the true number of Chinese people in Liverpool could range between 25,000 and 35,000. The first presence of Chinese people in Liverpool dated back to the early 19th century, with the main influx arriving at the end of the 19th century. This was in part due to Alfred Holt and Company establishing the first commercial shipping line to focus on the China trade. From the 1890s onwards, small numbers of Chinese began to set up businesses catering to the Chinese sailors working on Holt's lines and others. Some of these men married working class British women, resulting in a number of British-born Eurasian Chinese being born during World War II in Liverpool. Although the Chinese population in Liverpool is much smaller than it was mid-20th century, the city's Chinatown district has spread significantly since its first establishment, now taking up much of Berry Street. The 2001 census showed 1,542 Liverpudlians were born in the People's Republic of China and 1,228 in Hong Kong. Liverpool has been twinned with China's largest city, Shanghai since 1999.

==== Ghanaians ====
There is a strong presence of Ghanaians in Liverpool, with an estimated 9,000 individuals originating in the African nation living in the city. Liverpool is a stronghold for overseas Ghanaian students; significant numbers study at the city's three universities, particularly Hope University. Hope works alongside the Ghanaian High Commission and has set up the 'High Value Scholarship for Ghana', which alongside the university's other scholarships has helped draw a large number of potential students from the African nation.

==== Greeks ====
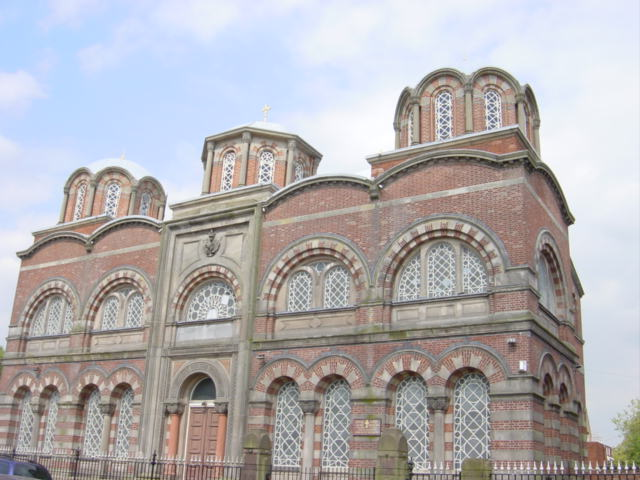
Greek Orthodox Church of St Nicholas, Toxteth

The Liverpool Greek community dates back over 180 years, and a group named the Liverpool Greek Society was established in 1996. The first large wave of Greeks to the city occurred in 1821 after massacres of Greeks by Turkish invaders on the island of Chios. Significant numbers also came to work for the Ralli Brothers, who recruited 40,000 Greeks in cities worldwide including New York City, Geneva and Liverpool. The Greek Orthodox Church of St Nicholas in Toxteth was built in 1870 and serves the local Greek community. There are estimated to be 2,500 Greek Cypriots in the Merseyside area, whilst 3,000 Greeks are estimated to live to the west of the River Mersey in the Wirral area, Chester and North Wales.

==== Irish ====
Following the start of the Great Irish Famine, two million Irish people migrated to Liverpool in the space of one decade, many of them subsequently departing for the United States. By 1851, more than 20% of the population of Liverpool was Irish. At the 2001 Census, 0.75% of the population were born in the Republic of Ireland, while 0.54% were born in Northern Ireland, but up to 50% of Liverpudlians are thought to have some form of Irish ancestry.

==== Italians ====
Significant numbers of Italians first arrived in Liverpool in the 19th century. The main reason for Italians coming to the city was to embark on a journey from the port of Liverpool to the 'New World' in hope of a better life than in their native Italy. Despite this many failed to complete the journey and actually remained in Liverpool, the largest numbers settling on and around Scotland Road, which soon became nicknamed 'Little Italy'. Currently, some 3,000 Italians reside in Liverpool, although little over 200 were actually born in Italy. There is an Italian Consulate located on the west side of the Mersey in Birkenhead adjacent to the Queensway Tunnel.

==== Latin Americans ====
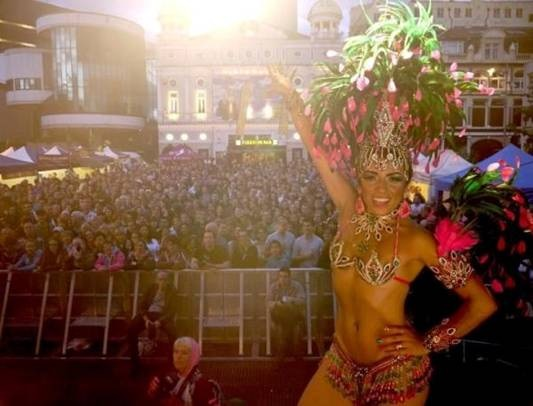
Brazilica Festival in Williamson Square in 2012

Liverpool and the surrounding urban area is home to UK's largest Latin American community outside London. Although significant migration from Latin America to the United Kingdom only began in the 1970s, at a time of much political turmoil and civil unrest in Latin America, Liverpool's Latin American community has seen a large increase in size during the mid-2000s. The majority of these people originate from Bolivia, Colombia, Brazil and Peru. Liverpool City Council and other local services offer information and help in Spanish and Portuguese due to the city's large Latin American population. The University of Liverpool is one of the few educational facilities in the country that teaches Latin American studies. Amongst the most famous Latin Americans in Liverpool are the numerous expatriate footballers who play for the city's professional football clubs. Liverpool F.C.'s current first team includes three Brazilians. Liverpool has friendship links with Havana, Cuba, La Plata, Argentina and Valparaíso, Chile. Brazilica Festival is the UK's largest celebration of Brazilian culture and has been held annually in Liverpool since 2008.

==== Malaysians ====
The IOM has stated that around 9,000 Malaysians live in the city which makes it one of the largest such communities in the country. They are the second largest East Asian group in Liverpool. There are also an estimated 1,500 Vietnamese residing in the city.

==== Somalis ====
Somalis number in the thousands in Liverpool, and are one of the city's longest established ethnic minority groups. According to the 2001 census, 678 Somali-born individuals were living in Liverpool, but unofficial estimates place the figure between 4,000 and 9,000 inhabitants. While many Somalis arrived in Liverpool seeking asylum after the outbreak of the Somali Civil War in 1991, there has been a presence of Somalis in the city since the 19th century, when many came to Liverpool to work for the British Navy, often by way of the former British Somaliland protectorate. Today, Liverpool City Council and local services offer information and help in the Somali language (this is alongside information in English and 15 other common languages in Liverpool). The majority of Liverpool's Somali community reside in Toxteth, where there are numerous Somali-run businesses and community groups. In 2004, a local social worker, Mohamed "Jimmy" Ali, became the UK's first Somali councillor, although he has since lost his seat.

==== South Asians ====
Like most British cities, Liverpool has a strong presence of South Asians. 2007 estimates put the number of people of Indian origin in the city at 6,700, Pakistanis at 3,200, Bangladeshis at 1,100. Some 2,000 people belonged to other South Asian groups whilst a further 2,000 individuals were of mixed South Asian and European origin. Bengali and Urdu are amongst the most common foreign languages spoken in Liverpool. The South Asian population of Liverpool is one of the city's fastest growing ethnic groups; in 2001 some 5,000 South Asians were residing in the city (1.1% of the local population). Over the next eight years, the community more than doubled in size to 13,000 (3% of the local population, which is actually much lower than England's average of 6%).

The Indian presence in Liverpool dates back to 1860s, although these people only tended to be sailors and tradesmen. However, around 1910 a group of Indian males from the Punjab region of India moved to Liverpool and established the city's first fixed community. During World War I, many more came to Liverpool to look for work while numerous more came to the city after India was granted independence in 1947. Two other significant waves of Indians to the city occurred when India was split into two separate countries (the other now known as Pakistan), the mass exodus of Indians from Kenya in the 1970s further added to Liverpool's long established South Asian community. Historically, the first place Indians and fellow South Asians looked for work were the docks of Liverpool. It was a hard living with little pay and the fact that they spoke little to no English made it even harder. They were proud people and working in oppressive conditions for people who were considered 'higher up', leading to many ending their jobs at the docks and seeking work elsewhere. Eventually, large numbers of Indians in Liverpool set up their own businesses. Many began to work for themselves as street peddlers, entertainers and fortune tellers. The hours were long, but being their own boss appealed to many South Asians (a thought which is still maintained to this day).

==== Welsh ====
In 1813, 10% of Liverpool's population was Welsh, leading to the city becoming known as "the capital of North Wales". 120,000 Welsh people migrated from Wales to Liverpool between 1851 and 1911. At the 2001 Census, 1.17% of the population were Welsh-born.

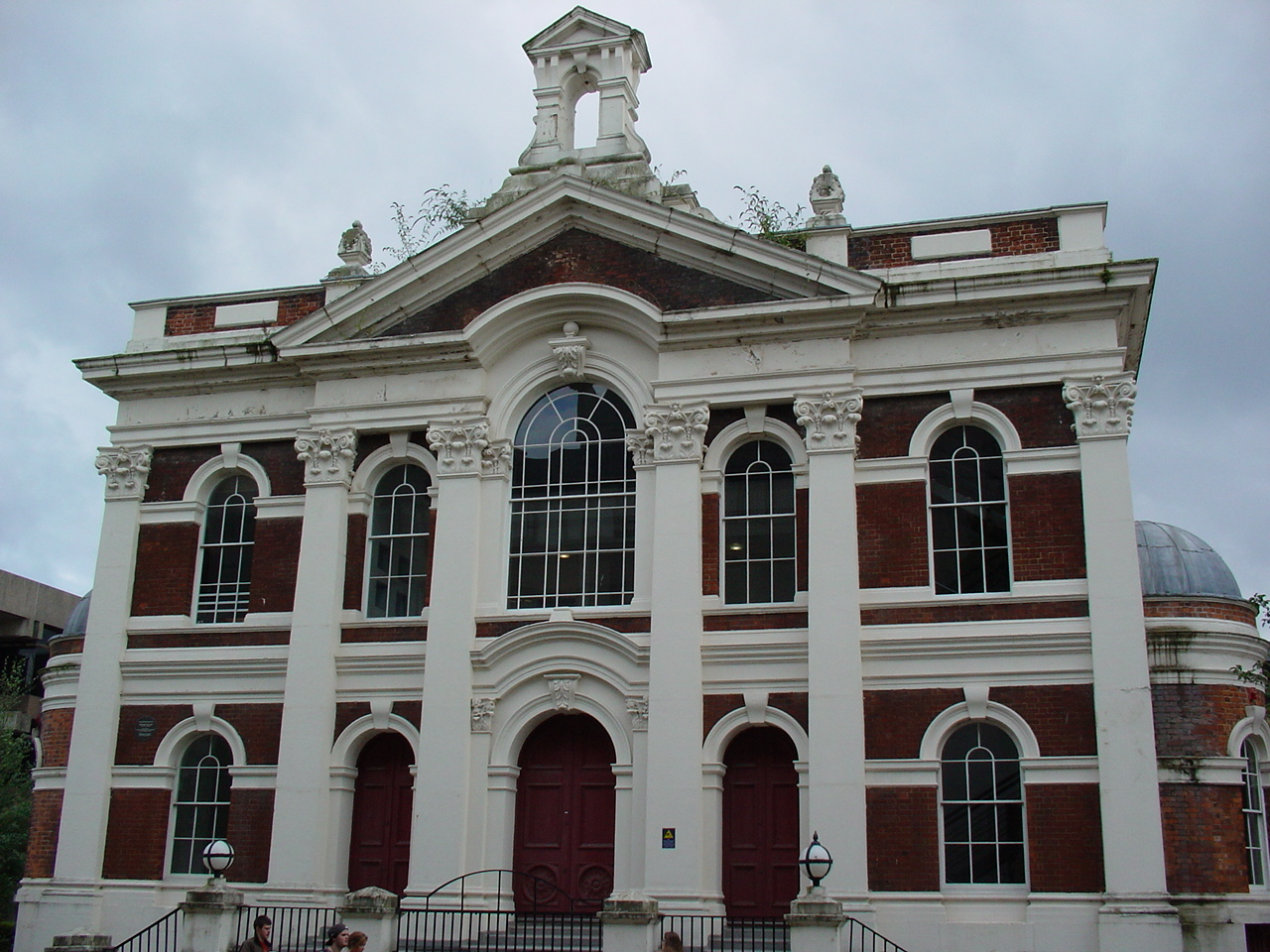
Old Welsh Chapel, Chatham Street, Liverpool. Now part of the University of Liverpool.

==== Yemenis ====
Liverpool, like several other port cities (such as South Shields, Cardiff and Kingston upon Hull), has had a strong presence of Yemeni people for centuries. After the opening of the Suez Canal in 1869, an increase of trade between Britain and the Far East meant that more men had to be recruited to work in ports and on ships. Aden in Yemen was the main refuelling point for the vast majority of ships sailing this route, which led to many locals taking up jobs in the field. During the late 19th and early 20th centuries many of these seamen moved ashore and set up home in the likes of Liverpool. Yemenis (who are most likely Liverpool's largest Arab group) alongside Somalis are the two largest Muslim groups in the city and worship at Liverpool's three main mosques (including the Al-Rahma mosque). It is unknown exactly how many Yemenis and people of Yemeni descent live in Liverpool, due to the fact that Yemeni ethnic/national origin couldn't be stated in the 2001 census. Despite this, the 'Arab' ethnic option was added to the 2011 UK Census. Many Yemenis in the city are noted for running newsagents and corner shops, the number of which is estimated to be approximately 400 in 2008.

==== Zimbabweans ====
People originating in Zimbabwe are another large Black African group in Liverpool; they are thought to number no fewer than 3,000.

==== Detailed ====
The following table shows the 20 largest ethnic groups as identified by the residents of Liverpool in the 2021 census.

Ethnicity	Population	%
1. White: English, Welsh, Scottish, Northern Irish or British	375,766	77.30%
2. Asian: Chinese	8,841	1.82%
3. Other: Arab	8,312	1.71%
4. White: Irish	6,826	1.40%
5. Asian: Indian	6,251	1.29%
6. Black: African unspecified	5,481	1.13%
7. White: Polish	4,533	0.93%
8. White: European Mixed	4,450	0.92%
9. Mixed: White and Black African	4,157	0.86%
10. Mixed: White and Black Caribbean	4,127	0.85%
11. Asian: Pakistani	3,673	0.76%
12. Mixed: White and Asian	3,662	0.75%
13. Black: Nigerian	2,305	0.47%
14. White: Romanian	2,061	0.42%
15. Other: Kurdish	1,950	0.40%
16. Asian: Bangladeshi	1,917	0.39%
17. Black: Black British	1,829	0.38%
18. Black: Caribbean	1,481	0.30%
19. Mixed: Other Mixed	1,392	0.29%
20. White: Other White, White unspecified	1,365	0.28%

These detailed ethnicities are based on the self-designation entries used in UK ethnicity classifications. It is important to recognise that people of one ethnicity, such as Iranians, may identify within different broad ethnicity classifications which will affect this table. For example, 856 people identified as 'Asian: Iranian' in Liverpool, with a further 637 people identifying as 'Other: Iranian'. This combination would put Iranian as a top 20 ethnicity in Liverpool.

== Country of birth ==
The country of birth of residents in Liverpool by year is shown below

Country of birth	2001		2011		2021	
Country of birth	Number	%	Number	%	Number	%
Europe	426,196	97.0%	435,790	93.4%	442,189	91.0%
United Kingdom	418,679	95.3%	420,290	90.1%	413,636	85.1%
England	407,769	92.8%	407,334	87.3%	399,358	82.2%
Scotland	3,376	0.8%	3,196	0.7%	2,983	0.6%
Wales	5,133	1.2%	4,771	1.0%	5,638	1.2%
Northern Ireland	2,375	0.5%	4,948	1.1%	5,640	1.2%
Great Britain (not otherwise specified)	–	–	11	0.0%	3	0.0%
United Kingdom (not otherwise specified)	26	0.0%	30	0.0%	14	0.0%
Other Europe	7,517	1.7%	15,500	3.3%	28,553	5.9%
EU countries (Note: Figure accounts for the EU countries at the time of that census. For example, in the figure 2001 the count for Poland is not included as it had not yet joined the union.)	6,035	1.4%	13,901	3.0%	25,503	5.2%
EU Member Countries in March 2001	6,035	1.4%	7,453	1.6%	10,794	2.2%
Ireland	3,291	0.8%	3,294	0.7%	2,720	0.6%
France	389	0.1%	512	0.1%	578	0.1%
Germany	1,003	0.2%	1,289	0.3%	1,176	0.2%
Italy	240	0.1%	489	0.1%	1,973	0.4%
Portugal (including Madeira and the Azores)	76	0.0%	250	0.1%	803	0.2%
Spain (including Canary Islands	286	0.1%	610	0.1%	1,731	0.4%
Other EU member countries in March 2001	750	0.2%	1,009	0.2%	1,813	0.4%
EU Countries that joined March 2001-March 2011	–	–	6,448	1.4%	14,649	3.0%
Lithuania	–	–	531	0.1%	1,024	0.2%
Poland	131	0.0%	3,531	0.8%	5,652	1.2%
Romania	41	0.0%	246	0.1%	3,493	0.7%
Other Countries that joined the EU March 2001-March 2011	–	–	2,140	0.5%	4,480	0.9%
EU Countries that joined March 2011-March 2021	–	–	–	–	60	0.0%
Croatia	–	–	–	–	60	0.0%
Rest of Europe	–	–	1,237 (Note: Includes individuals born in Croatia, as Croatia was not an EU member state in March 2011)	0.3%	3,050	0.6%
Turkey	162	0.0%	354	0.1%	815	0.2%
Other Rest of Europe	–	–	883	0.2%	2,235	0.5%
Africa	3,311	0.8%	8,886	1.9%	11,145	2.3%
North Africa	513	0.1%	1,227	0.3%	2,550	0.5%
Central and Western Africa	970	0.2%	3,374	0.7%	4,323	0.9%
Ghana	–	–	479	0.1%	570	0.1%
Nigeria	579	0.1%	1,951	0.4%	2,545	0.5%
Other Central and Western Africa	391	0.1%	944	0.2%	1,208	0.2%
South and Eastern Africa	1,828	0.4%	4,239	0.9%	4,251	0.9%
Kenya	167	0.0%	387	0.1%	266	0.1%
Somalia	678	0.2%	1,249	0.3%	1,072	0.2%
South Africa	363	0.1%	593	0.1%	575	0.1%
Zimbabwe	148	0.0%	1,070	0.2%	809	0.2%
Other South and Eastern Africa	472	0.1%	940	0.2%	1,529	0.3%
Middle East and Asia	9,480	2.2%	18,747	4.0%	26,360	5.4%
Middle East	1,641	0.4%	5,416	1.2%	9,428	1.9%
Iran	234	0.1%	763	0.2%	1,927	0.4%
Iraq	335	0.1%	–	–	1,978	0.4%
Other Middle East	1,072	0.2%	4,653	1.0%	5,523	1.1%
Eastern Asia	–	–	5,810	1.2%	6,328	1.3%
China	1,542	0.4%	4,640	1.0%	4,775	1.0%
Hong Kong	1,228	0.3%	926	0.2%	1,237	0.3%
Other Eastern Asia	–	–	244	0.1%	316	0.1%
Southern Asia	1,948	0.4%	5,480	1.2%	7,966	1.6%
Afghanistan	40	0.0%	–	–	410	0.1%
Bangladesh	310	0.1%	552	0.1%	835	0.2%
India	992	0.2%	3,082	0.7%	3,592	0.7%
Pakistan	387	0.1%	1,023	0.2%	1,752	0.4%
Sri Lanka	207	0.0%	575	0.1%	1,185	0.2%
Other Southern Asia	12	0.0%	248	0.1%	192	0.0%
South-East Asia	–	–	2,012	0.4%	2,592	0.5%
Malaysia	378	0.1%	–	–	595	0.1%
Philippines	–	–	580	0.1%	875	0.2%
Singapore	144	0.0%	–	–	171	0.0%
Other South-East Asia	–	–	1,432	0.3%	951	0.2%
Central Asia	14	0.0%	29	0.0%	46	0.0%
The Americas and the Caribbean	1,510	0.3%	2,410	0.5%	5,766	1.2%
North America	737	0.2%	1,104	0.2%	1,426	0.3%
United States	435	0.1%	726	0.2%	1,050	0.2%
Canada	245	0.1%	–	–	310	0.1%
Other North America	57	0.0%	378	0.1%	66	0.0%
Central America	–	–	136	0.0%	279	0.1%
South America	284	0.1%	506	0.1%	3,555	0.7%
The Caribbean	489	0.1%	664	0.1%	506	0.1%
Jamaica	202	0.0%	239	0.1%	173	0.0%
Other Caribbean	287	0.1%	425	0.1%	333	0.1%
Antarctica and Oceania	418	0.1%	581	0.1%	628	0.1%
Australia	267	0.1%	383	0.1%	431	0.1%
New Zealand	107	0.0%	–	–	146	0.0%
Other Antarctica and Oceania	22	0.0%	198	0.0%	51	0.0%
Other	221	0.1%	1	0.0%	2	0.0%
Total	439,473	100%	466,415	100%	486,090	100%

At least 1,000 residents of Liverpool were born in the following countries:

Rank	Country of Birth	Population (2021)
1	Poland	5,652
2	China	4,775
3	India	3,592
4	Romania	3,493
5	Ireland	2,720
6	Brazil	2,702
7	Nigeria	2,545
8	Iraq	1,978
9	Italy	1,973
10	Iran	1,927
11	Pakistan	1,752
12	Spain	1,731
13	Yemen	1,507
14	Syria	1,491
15	Hong Kong	1,237
16	Sri Lanka	1,185
17	Germany	1,176
18	Somalia	1,072
19	United States	1,050
20	Lithuania	1,024

== Languages ==
The most common main languages spoken in Liverpool according to the 2021 census are shown below.

Rank	Language	Usual residents aged 3+	Proportion
1	English	425,452	90.44%
2	Arabic	5,743	1.22%
3	Polish	4,809	1.02%
4	All other Chinese (Note: Chinese languages other than Mandarin and Cantonese)	3,326	0.71%
5	Portuguese	3,283	0.70%
6	Romanian	3,063	0.65%
7	Spanish	2,145	0.46%
8	Kurdish	2,084	0.44%
9	Persian/Farsi	1,460	0.31%
10	Italian	1,429	0.30%
11	Cantonese	1,202	0.26%
12	Tamil	1,039	0.22%
13	Malayalam	853	0.18%
14	Greek	800	0.17%
15	Hungarian	795	0.17%
16	Czech	734	0.16%
17	Urdu	717	0.15%
=18	Lithuanian	698	0.15%
=18	Turkish	698	0.15%
20	Bulgarian	694	0.15%
–	Other	9,415	2.00%
	Population	470,439	100.00%

== Religion ==
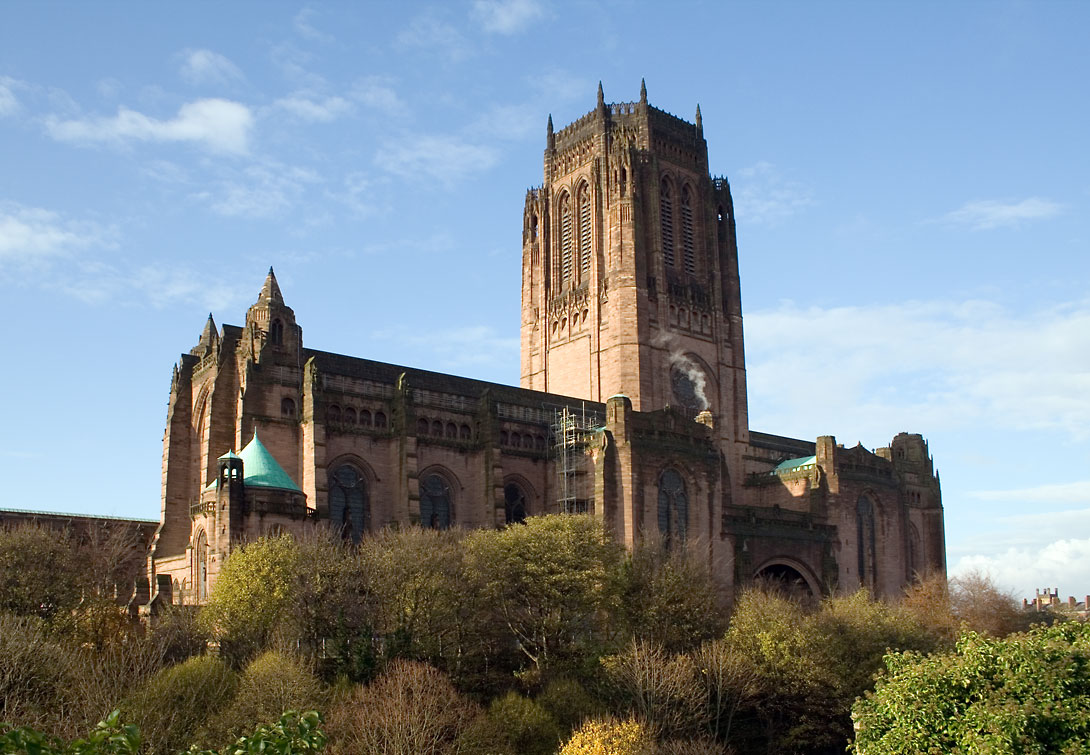
Liverpool Cathedral

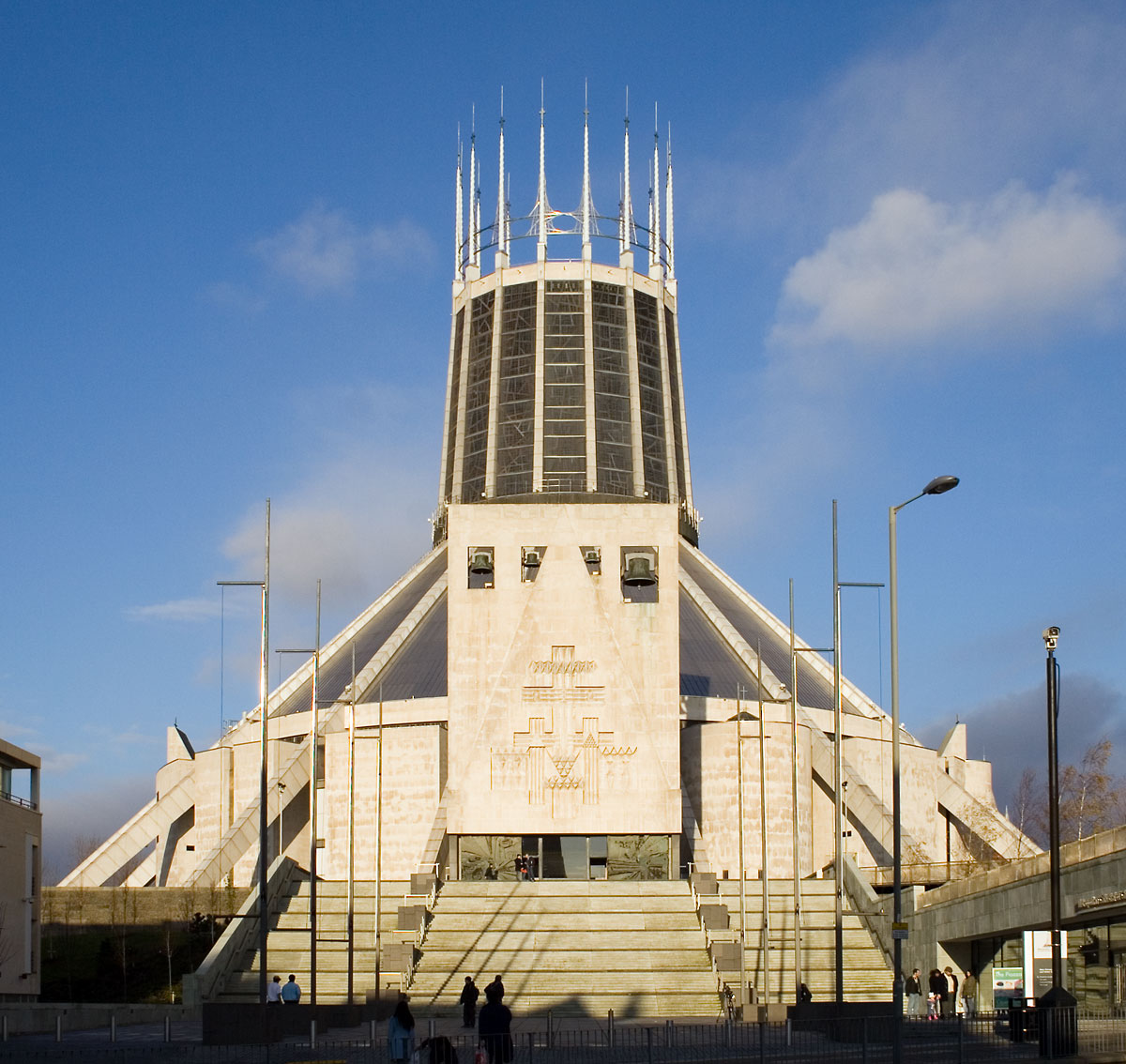
Liverpool Metropolitan Cathedral

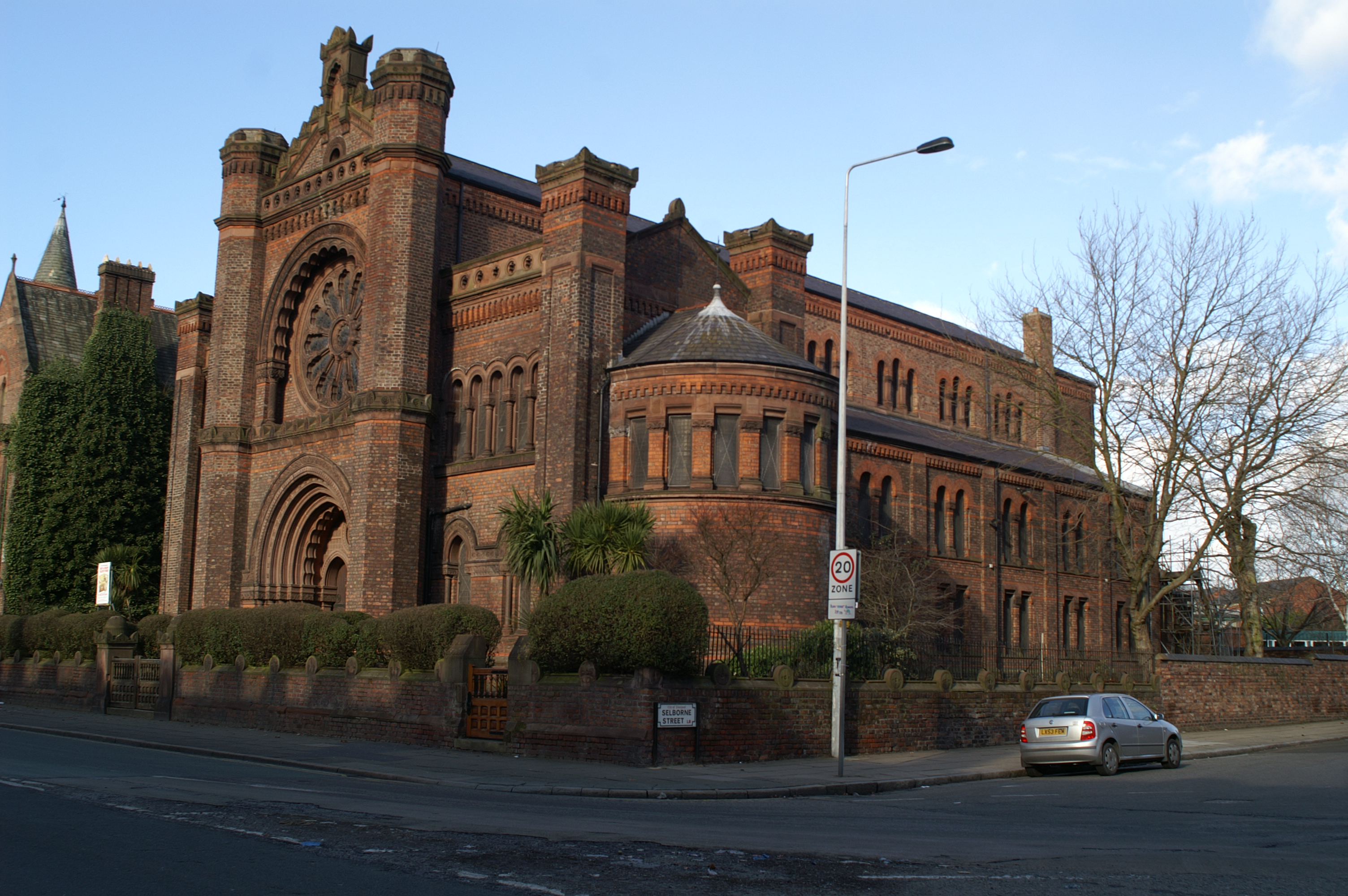
Princes Road Synagogue

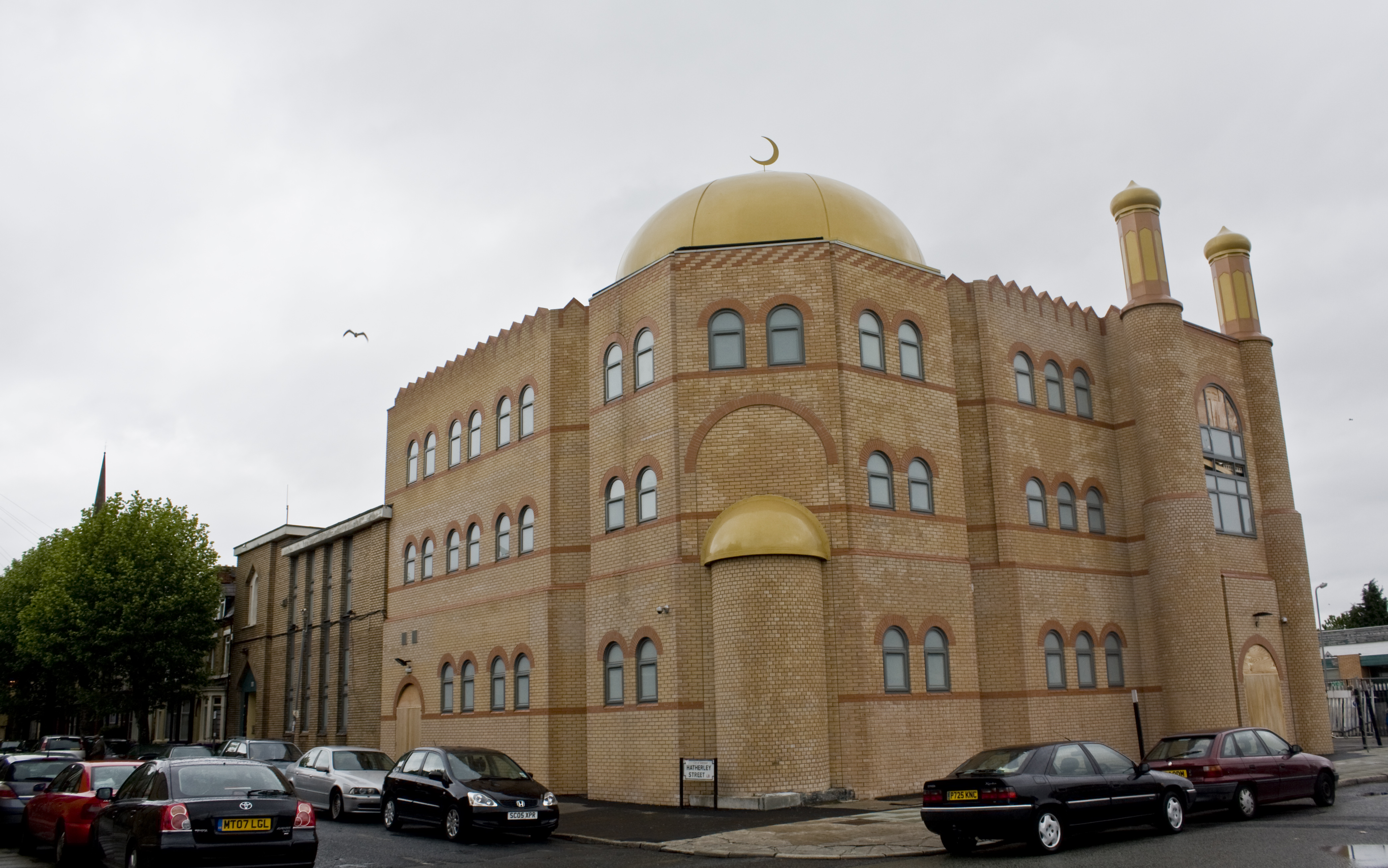
Al-Rahma Mosque

=== Overview ===
Due to thousands of migrants and sailors passing through Liverpool over the centuries, the city now has a religious diversity which is reflected in its equally diverse collection of religious buildings. At the time of the 2001 census, 79.5% of the city's population were Christian, 1.4% were Muslim, 0.6% were Jewish, 0.3% were Buddhist, 0.3% were Hindu, and 0.1% were Sikh. Just over 0.1% of individuals collectively belonged to other faiths whilst 9.7% claimed to be non-religious and 8.1% opted not to reveal their religion.

==== Census data ====
Religion	2001		2011		2021	
Religion	Number	%	Number	%	Number	%
Buddhism	1,198	0.27%	2,017	0.43%	2,128	0.44%
Christianity	349,279	79.48%	331,217	71.01%	278,330	57.26%
Hinduism	1,147	0.26%	2,437	0.52%	3,802	0.78%
Islam	5,945	1.35%	15,209	3.26%	25,756	5.30%
Judaism	2,698	0.61%	2,157	0.46%	1,807	0.37%
No Religion	42,515	9.67%	82,701	17.73%	142,994	29.42%
Sikhism	404	0.09%	531	0.11%	641	0.13%
Other Religion	556	0.13%	1,122	0.24%	1,991	0.41%
Undeclared	35,731	8.13%	29,024	6.22%	28,639	5.89%
Total	439,473	100%	466,415	100%	486,088	100%

Per the above table, note that the census question regarding religion was first asked in 2001 and response is voluntary.

=== Christianity ===
The parish church of Liverpool is the Church of Our Lady and Saint Nicholas, an Anglican church which has existed near the waterfront since 1257. Though it is Anglican, it regularly plays host to Catholic masses. Other notable Christian places of worship include the Church of St Nicholas (Greek Orthodox) and the Gustav Adolf Church (Lutheranism). The Church of St Luke was bombed by the Nazis in the Liverpool Blitz during World War II and has been abandoned ever since, though it has become a noted tourist attraction as its damage was never fixed and the roof is still missing entirely, earning it the local nickname of the "bombed-out church".

Liverpool's wealth as a port city enabled the construction of two enormous cathedrals, both dating from the 20th century. The Anglican Cathedral, which was designed by Sir Giles Gilbert Scott and plays host to the annual Liverpool Shakespeare Festival, is the fifth largest cathedral in the world. The Catholic Metropolitan Cathedral was initially planned to be even larger. Designed by Sir Edwin Lutyens, only the crypt was completed. The cathedral was eventually built to a simpler design by Sir Frederick Gibberd; while this is on a smaller scale than Lutyens' original design, it boasts the largest panel of stained glass in the world. The road running between the two cathedrals is called Hope Street, a coincidence which is often commented on positively by both Anglicans and Catholics.

=== Islam ===
Liverpool had one of the earliest mosques in Britain, founded in 1887 by William Abdullah Quilliam, a lawyer who had converted to Islam. This mosque, which was also the first in England, no longer exists. Plans have been ongoing to re-convert the building where the mosque once stood into a museum. Currently, there are four mosques in Liverpool: the largest and main one, Al-Rahma Mosque, in the Toxteth area of the city and a mosque recently opened in the Mossley Hill suburb. The third mosque was also opened in Toxteth. Multimillion-pound plans to refurbish and restore the city's first mosque were revealed in January 2010. In 2018, the Bait-ul-Lateef Mosque opened on Breck Road in Everton, owned by the Ahmadiyya Muslim Association of Liverpool, making it the fourth mosque to be currently operating in the city.

=== Judaism ===
Records of Liverpool's Jewish community date back to the 1750s, and it became the largest Jewish community in northern England during the 1800s. It is believed that Jewish refugees were welcomed and accepted much more easily than in most other English cities, prompting them to encourage their descendants to remain in the city for generations. The Jewish population reached up to 11,000 in the past, but this dwindled due to the common practice of moving elsewhere for work, and the current number is around 3,000. Most Jews reside in the southern areas of the city, primarily in the suburbs of Allerton and Childwall, each of which has its own Orthodox synagogue.

The most notable synagogue is the Orthodox Princes Road Synagogue in the Toxteth district, which is widely considered to be the best of the UK's Moorish Revival synagogues and one of the finest buildings in Liverpool. Consecrated in 1874, its congregation also pioneered the use of the English language in Jewish services. Another Orthodox synagogue, Greenbank Drive Synagogue in the Mossley Hill suburb, operated from 1937 until 2008. The city's Reform Jews congregate at Liverpool Reform Synagogue in the Wavertree district, which was consecrated in 1962, while there is also a Masorti community in the Woolton suburb. Other Jewish institutions include the Lubavitch Foundation in Allerton, King David High School in Wavertree, and the Merseyside Jewish Community Care charity on Smithdown Road.

Notable Liverpudlian Jews include entrepreneur Brian Epstein, who managed the Beatles; actor Jason Isaacs, whose great-grandparents co-founded the Jewish community in Childwall; businessman David Lewis, who founded the Lewis's department store chain and left much money after his death for the construction of what would become some of the city's most important hospitals and philanthropic institutions; Lewis's chairman Harold Cohen, who funded the construction of the University of Liverpool's Harold Cohen Library; and rabbi Isser Yehuda Unterman, who was Chief Rabbi of Liverpool for 22 years before becoming Chief Rabbi of Israel.

=== Buddhism ===
The Duldzin Buddhist Centre and Kadampa Meditation Centre is located in the Aigburth suburb and focuses on Kadampa Buddhism.

=== Hinduism ===
Liverpool's Hindu community is served by a Mandir on Edge Lane, which also hosts the Radha Krishna Hindu Temple and the Hindu Cultural Organisation.

=== Sikhism ===
Liverpool has a gurdwara in the Wavertree district.
