= Brazilica Festival =

Annual celebration of Brazilian culture in Liverpool, England

Brazilica
- Brazilica Festival logo
- Frequency: Annually in July
- Location: Liverpool
- Years active: 13
- Inaugurated: 2008
- Participants: Over 750
- Attendance: Over 80,000
- Website: Brazilica Festival website

The Brazilica Festival is the largest celebration of Brazilian culture in the United Kingdom that has been held annually in Liverpool, England since July 2008. It is produced by the Liverpool Carnival Company, an organisation that has operated as a registered charity since 2007. The festival began during Liverpool's reign as European Capital of Culture in 2008 when a Rio-style Carnival Parade swept through the streets of the city. In its current format, the festival consists of a week-long celebration of Brazilian culture including music, art, food, film and dance events that take place at indoor venues across the city which build up to an outdoor city centre carnival street party that takes place in Williamson Square and samba carnival parade.

== History ==
The Liverpool Samba School was set up by husband and wife creative team Roger and Maeve Morris in 1995. The school performed at the Rio Carnival in 2000 and wanted to bring a touch of the Carnival's magic to streets in their own city. In 2007, the creative team established the Liverpool Carnival Company with an aim of delivering a Carnival event the following year.

=== 2008–2010 ===
The first official Carnival Parade took place on Saturday 2 August 2008 as part of the European Capital of Culture celebrations with over 500 performers from across the UK, Brazil (Mangueira), the Netherlands, Ireland, Germany and Spain taking part. The Parade led to an evening street party held at iconic Liverpool music venue The Picket. A similar event followed on Saturday 1 August in 2009 and at the slightly earlier date of Saturday 17 July in 2010. In 2010, the first Carnival Queen competition was held which went on to become a popular annual fixture in the festival calendar.

2010 Parade Participants:

- Sambatuc (Paris)
- Paraiso School of Samba (London)
- Oyá Batucada (Birmingham)
- Republic of Swing (Manchester)
- Cordoa de Ouro Capoeira (Liverpool/Manchester)
- Oxiris (Wirral)
- Manchester School of Samba
- Batala Liverpool
- Liverpool Samba school
- St Peter and Paul’s Samba Group (Widnes)

=== 2011–2012 ===
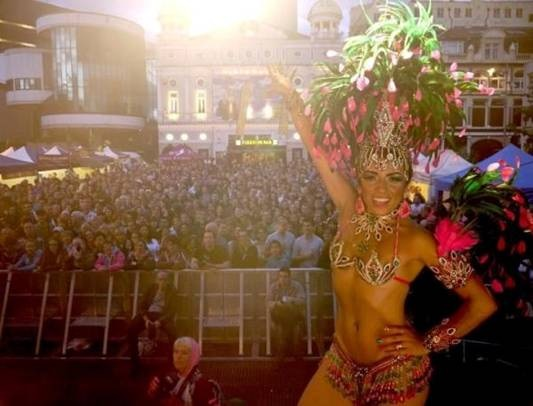
Crowds in Williamson Square at Brazilica Festival 2012

In 2011, it was decided to expand the annual Parade into a weekend of activity celebrating the culture of Brazil in greater depth. It is from this point the festival became known as 'Brazilica'.

One of the most notable additions to the festival was the positioning of a music stage, Latin American food festival and market place in the city centre location of Williamson Square that took place on the same day as the annual Carnival Parade. Instead of finishing at The Picket (as in previous years) the Parade came to an end at Williamson Square where performers took to the stage to close the festival.

In anticipation of Brazil playing host to the 2014 FIFA World Cup, the festival also hosts a Soccer Zone in the Clayton Square area of the city centre. The programme has been delivered by Liverpool F.C., Liverpool AFC, Liverpool Homeless FC and Brazilian Soccer Schools since 2011.

The festival also continued to host its annual Carnival Queen dance competition and, in 2011, hosted its inaugural Carnival Ball event. Both remain popular annual events taking place during the festival.

In 2012, Brazilica Festival teamed up with Festinho to open the weekend with a club night at Cream Nightclub featuring DJs including Norman Jay and DJ Marky.

By 2012, the festival had attracted over 80,000 visitors making it officially the largest Samba Carnival in the UK.

=== 2013–2019 ===
An announcement was made in October 2012 that Brazilica 2013 would expand into a week-long cultural festival, taking place from Friday 12 July to Friday 19 July 2013 and that the annual city centre Samba Carnival and Parade would take place on Saturday 20 July 2013.

2013 Parade Participants:

- Sargento Pimenta (Rio)
- Paraiso School of Samba (London)
- London School of Samba (London)
- Rhythms of the City (London)
- Liverpool Samba School (Liverpool)
- Manchester School of Samba (Manchester)
- Hull Samba (Hull)
- Oxiris (Wirral)
- Karamba Samba (Chester)
- Grupo Sambafriq (Chorley)
- Batala Liverpool (Liverpool)
- Arco Iris (Cambridge)
- Oya Batucada (Birmingham)
- Nottingham School of Samba (Nottingham)

=== 2020–2021 ===
The festival was due to take place 10–12 July 2020 but was postponed until 10 July 2021 because of the coronavirus pandemic, a date which itself has been postponed for the same reason.
