= Dorothy Tenham =

English actor and stage manager

- Born: Dorothy Swettenham; 1 April 1931; Southport, Lancashire, England
- Died: 15 February 2008 (aged 76); Pitlochry, Perthshire, Scotland
- Years active: 1950–1981
- Known for: Pioneering teacher of technical theatre

Dorothy Tenham (born Dorothy Swettenham; 1 April 1931 – 15 February 2008) was an English actor and stage manager who became a pioneering teacher of technical theatre. In the mid-1950s she established, against much opposition, the first course in the United Kingdom for training stage managers and other theatre technicians, and in so doing played a crucial role in the formalisation of technical theatre practice. At the Royal Academy of Dramatic Art in London she trained many students who were to become the UK's leading stage managers, as well as those students who later flourished in other theatrical craft disciplines or elsewhere in the creative arts. Her course informed the industry and set the standard for all subsequent theatrical technical training in drama schools, universities and technical colleges.

== Early life and career ==
Tenham was born in Southport, Lancashire on 1 April 1931 to Walter Swettenham, a master baker and confectioner, and Ethel Swettenham, a prominent local producer of amateur theatre. She was educated in Southport. At the age of 15 she was playing roles in amateur drama in the town and the wider locality and receiving good reviews.

By the age of 19 Tenham had become a professional actor and was a member of the resident repertory company of the Liverpool Playhouse. The manager of the Playhouse, Maud Carpenter, complained that the name "Dorothy Swettenham" was too long to fit on the theatre's programmes and insisted that it be shortened to Dorothy Tenham. (Note: Tenham herself later shortened her name further, being known throughout the theatre business as Dot Tenham, though she continued to use Dorothy Tenham for formal purposes.)

By 1952 Tenham had moved to London and, with a gift for comedy, was appearing in a number of plays in repertory at the Arts Theatre in the West End, having been cast by the theatre's manager and producer John Fernald. As was common in repertory theatre in the early 1950s, minor actors were also employed as assistant stage managers and it was in that task that Tenham found her métier and abandoned acting, becoming the Arts Theatre's resident stage manager (SM).

In 1955 John Fernald left the Arts Theatre to become Principal of the Royal Academy of Dramatic Art (RADA), taking over from the long-established Principal Sir Kenneth Barnes. Tenham went with Fernald to the academy as his SM but on the understanding that she could set up a training course for stage managers.

== Stage management training ==
The concept of the full-time training of stage managers was entirely new, and conceived by Tenham. (Note: At the time, stage management was being taught in at least one other drama school in the UK but only part-time for acting students to prepare them for employment as assistant stage managers as well as actors in their first jobs in repertory theatre.) Previously SMs had learnt casually on the job, but with modern advances in technical theatre and an increasingly rigorous approach towards theatrical apprenticeship, such casual training was becoming insupportable. Tenham insisted that training for stage managers at RADA should have the same status as the academy's training of actors, with the award of a RADA Diploma at the end of a student's training. She was also anxious to increase the status within the industry generally of the back-stage arts, leading to proper recognition for all the technical theatre disciplines as well as stage management. She met considerable and bitter opposition from the RADA Council but had the firm support of Fernald and was eventually given permission to proceed.

Tenham's course began slowly and tentatively in 1956 with just one student, but it grew steadily over the next few years, training up to six students at any one time. These students graduated as industry-level professionals after three or four terms, depending on aptitude. In 1962 Tenham was finally able to launch formally her Stage Management Course at RADA, the first new course to be introduced since the academy started operation almost 60 years before. Tenham's "tenacious and inspiring personality" and her "irrepressible and often irreverent good humour" resulted in a good–natured, energetic and intensive course, with about six new students starting each term, who graduated after four terms of theoretical and practical work. As well as the standard work of stage management – supervising rehearsals, managing the company and running productions – the course included training in stage-crewing, carpentry, set construction and painting, lighting, sound, costume, design, and the construction and sourcing of props. Students were also introduced to simple make–up, voice, movement and acting classes, box office accounting, safety and health, the history of theatre and a basic understanding of art, music, engineering, and sociology. As well as a handful of resident tutors Tenham brought in freelance teachers who excelled in their various fields and were experienced in working in the professional theatre.

Many of Tenham's students, benefitting from her uncompromising standards and the all-encompassing scope of her training, went on to become leading stage managers, company managers, and technical directors while others went variously into theatre production, lighting design, and theatre management, or into radio and television production, acting or other type of performing, or the music industry.

== Retirement and death ==
Tenham directed the course for 21 years before retiring in poor health in 1976. On her retirement she counted herself "among the fortunate who have enjoyed a career in theatre during a rather quiet revolution which has slowly turned the work of backstage staff from a semi-amateur labour of goodwill into a decent career requiring certain standards of efficiency for its survival." She moved to Scotland where she ran the box office at the Pitlochry Festival Theatre for five years. She was awarded a Stage Management Association special award in 1989 for her pioneering work in stage management training.

After living with vascular dementia she died on 15 February 2008 and is buried in Fonab Cemetery in Pitlochry. Her gravestone declares "She changed the face of professional theatre practice. Her influence lives on."
