= Monobloco =

Brazilian street band

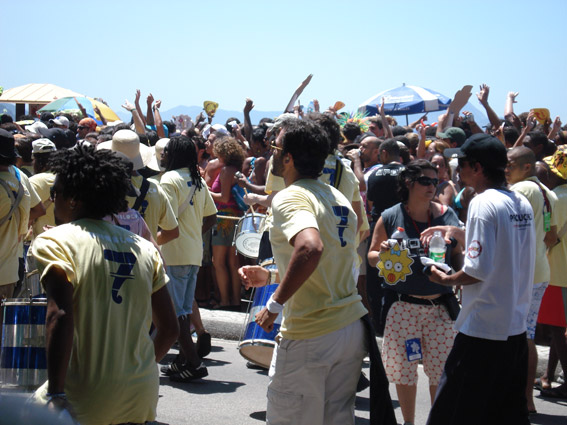
- Monobloco during Rio de Janeiro street carnival in 2007
- Foundation: 2000
- Location: Rio de Janeiro
- President: Pedro Luís (singer)
Carnival staff
- Director of Battery: Celso Alvim

Monobloco is a Brazilian bloco, or street band, that plays during Carnaval in Rio de Janeiro and is also a professional touring show. Unlike most of Rio's blocos, which tend play one type of music (typically samba), Monobloco has become extremely popular among younger people because of its 'fresh' sound, playing a mix of various rhythms such as coco, ciranda, marchinha, xote, samba, contemporary R&B, and particularly samba-rock and funk. It continues to grow in popularity each year, and can be seen as a symbol of the resurging popularity in Carnaval blocos in Rio de Janeiro.

== History ==
The group was formed by members of rock band Pedro Luís e A Parede in 2000 as an education project and continues to run a percussion course each year. However, the group's popularity soon led to the creation of a professional touring band, the Monobloco Show, which has toured extensively around Brazil and has also travelled internationally.

Their public 'rehearsals' at Fundição Progresso in Lapa, the nightclub district of central Rio de Janeiro, regularly attract up to 4,000 paying spectators on the Friday nights leading up to Carnival. At these shows the group consists of over 100 percussionists as well as singers and cavaquinho player. Famous musicians and singers are often featured at these shows as guest performers. The bloco performs for free on the street once a year. That used to take place in the neighborhood of Copacabana, on the Sunday following Carnival, thus 'closing' Carnaval. In 2006, the city asked them to perform at 9 am, instead of later in the day, so that fewer people would come. Nevertheless, they attracted tens of thousands of people to parade with them, dancing along the road and the adjacent beach. In 2007 they performed again at 9 am attracting an estimated 80,000 people and in 2008 200.000. In 2009 the city asked the bloco to move to the downtown business center, where the performance would not disturb the citizens during the weekend. They attracted a crowd estimated in 400.000.

In 2002 the group released an eponymous CD. Their second release, a live CD and DVD entitled "Monobloco Ao Vivo", recorded in October 2006 and released in 2007, has had tremendous success. They released a new live CD, "10", in early 2010. 10 was recorded at Fundição Progresso in the autumn of 2009.

Their name comes from the fact that, when it was founded, they had the idea of recording the sound of the entire bloco with just one microphone, hence "mono"-bloco.

== Touring ==
The Monobloco Show toured the United Kingdom for the first time in July 2007 and returned again in 2008 and 2009. They have also toured in Portugal, Denmark, Australia and New Zealand where as well as performing at various venues they conducted workshops for local bands such as AKSamba and Wellington Batucada.

Members of Monobloco returned to London in 2012 in the wake of the impending Olympics in a joint venture with 'Sargento Pimenta' and performed in the Hackney Carnival with the UK's 'Bloco Sol Nascente' to celebrate the Olympic torch passing through North London.

They have since released a new album in 2013 'Arrastao da Alegria' with collaborations with stars like Ivete Sangalo and Ailton Assumpcao.
