= Eve Shapiro =

South African drama teacher and theatre director

- Born: 13 August 1930; Pretoria, South Africa
- Died: 1 December 2022 (aged 92); New York, USA
- Occupations: Drama teacher and theatre director
- Years active: 1961—2020
- Known for: Faculty membership of RADA, London, and Juilliard School, New York

Evelyn L. Shapiro (13 August 1930—1 December 2022) was a South Africa–born drama teacher and theatre director, who had a profound influence on generations of acting and opera-singing students in the UK and the USA. A talented young amateur theatre director, she left South Africa to train professionally at RADA (Royal Academy of Dramatic Art) in London and on graduation in 1961 joined the academy's staff as a director and teacher. In the mid-1970s, Shapiro moved to New York to join the Drama Division at the Juilliard School where she taught and directed. In 1988, she transferred to Juilliard's Vocal Arts Division to teach acting to opera students, and to direct operas. Shapiro continued to work at Juilliard until she was 90. In her working career, she directed more than 100 plays and operas in Europe and the United States.

== Early life ==
Eve Shapiro was born on 13 August 1930 in Pretoria, Gauteng Province, South Africa into a musical family in the city's small Jewish community. While still at school she showed a precocious interest in drama and became involved in South Africa's then thriving amateur theatre scene. She had an ambition to be an actor but, shortly after leaving school, in 1949 she was asked to direct a one–act play, and, as she confessed in an interview towards the end of her life, at her then age "ignorance was bliss", and she agreed. She chose the play Symphony in Illusion by James Wallace Bell which has a cast of 7 female players. In 1949 the play was entered in the annual competition organised by the Federation of Amateur Theatrical Societies of South Africa (FATSSA) and won the award for the best amateur theatrical production of the year. As a consequence, Shapiro directed many amateur productions in Pretoria over a number of years. After some time she met a female actor from the Vienna Burgtheater who was on tour in South Africa and who was a great influence on her. The actor saw Shapiro's work and advised her that she should become a professional theatre director. Shapiro took the advice and in pursuit of that ambition "I realised everything I was doing was just on instinct but I'd never really trained and so I decided to go to England."

== Britain and RADA ==
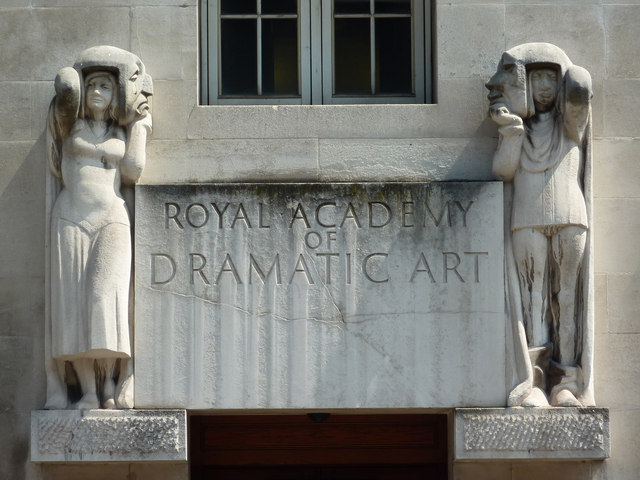
Royal Academy of Dramatic Art, London

When Shapiro emigrated to Britain she went as a student to RADA (Royal Academy of Dramatic Art) in London on a scholarship, though not as an acting student. Because a directing course was not available at that time, she trained as a stage manager. In 1956 the academy's Director of Stage Management, Dorothy Tenham, had started training students to be stage managers in a very limited programme. Shapiro, in 1959, was only the fourth student to enter the course. "The good thing about the stage management program", she recalled, "is that you watch very, very good directors, and I was lucky, I saw some really marvellous people working." To another interviewer she remarked that "I learned from observation, as I went along."

Shapiro also took the opportunity to see as many London theatre productions as she could, often many times. She reminisced in her interview, carried out when she was 81, that she saw plays "almost every day ... it was just so wonderful being there ... people like Peggy Ashcroft, John Gielgud, Olivier ... watching them was inspiring ... I was in the theatre all the time."

Shapiro graduated from RADA with a Diploma in Stage Management in the summer of 1961, at the age of 31.

Anxious to pursue her directing ambitions she approached the Principal of RADA, John Fernald, and asked if she could direct a play for the academy. Fernald had three student-performed plays lined up to tour to Basel, Switzerland, and offered Shapiro one of them to direct, which was Village Wooing, by George Bernard Shaw. She accepted the task and it became her first professional theatre engagement. "I was very lucky," Shapiro recalled. "I had people who had faith in me and gave me a chance." The play was a success and Fernald invited Shapiro to join RADA's academic staff to direct, and shortly after to teach.

At the same time, Shapiro, openly lesbian, began to share her life and an apartment in Park Crescent in Marylebone, London with her earlier stage management tutor at the academy, Dorothy Tenham. It was there that Shapiro first began her lifelong habit of inviting students to her home for coaching, to read and discuss passages from drama, particularly William Shakespeare, "dispense wisdom over tea and bake scones together".

Shapiro remained with the academy full–time for 15 years and then part–time for a further three, tutoring, mentoring and directing multiple generations of acting students over that period. Well over 2,000 aspiring actors applied for the two–year RADA acting course every year, but the academy had the capacity for an intake of only 20 or so every other term, resulting in 80 students under instruction at any one time.

Many of the student actors Shapiro taught and mentored at RADA went on to recognition and success. Among them were Kenneth Cranham, Henry Goodman, Sir Anthony Hopkins, Robert Lindsay, Sir Jonathan Pryce, Alan Rickman, and Dame Imelda Staunton.

As well as tutoring, Shapiro directed as many as three major student productions every year at RADA for public performance in the academy's theatres. The choice of plays to be produced and their casting was usually the prerogative of the principal of the academy. During her time on the staff Shapiro was invited to return regularly to the works of Shakespeare, directing Richard III, Othello, Macbeth, and King Lear among others of his plays. She also brought a wide variety of British and Irish writers' works to RADA's stages with, for instance, plays by George Bernard Shaw (Village Wooing), John Ford ('Tis Pity She's a Whore), John Webster (The Duchess of Malfi) and Harold Brighouse (Hobson's Choice). Playwrights of the European continent were not forgotten, with works by, for instance, Luigi Pirandello (Henry IV and Six Characters in Search of an Author), Friedrich Schiller (Mary Stuart), Jean Anouilh (Antigone), Henrik Ibsen (The Lady from the Sea), Ivan Turgenev (A Month in the Country), Bertolt Brecht (Mother Courage and her Children) and Federico García Lorca (The House of Bernarda Alba). Anton Chekhov was one of Shapiro's favourite playwrights, with productions of The Cherry Orchard, Three Sisters, and others. She liked also to specialise in American works, even musicals. Kiss Me, Kate and Man of La Mancha appeared under her direction, as well as more straight fair, like Eugene O'Neill's Long Day's Journey Into Night, William Inge's Picnic, and Philip Barry's The Philadelphia Story. Tennessee Williams was a perennial favourite, with productions of A Streetcar named Desire, Cat on a Hot Tin Roof, The Glass Menagerie, and The Night of the Iguana, and plays by Arthur Miller, such as The Crucible and Death of a Salesman. Shapiro directed 40 or so plays at RADA during her time on the academy's staff. "Interestingly," she told a US interviewer in 2002, "when I was working in England, I always did American plays, I loved them. Williams, O'Neill, Miller; I even did Picnic. I was always the person who did American plays."

In addition to being on the RADA staff, in the mid-1960s Shapiro taught at the Webber-Douglas Academy of Dramatic Art in London and directed a few productions there. Early in the 1970s, while continuing at RADA, she was appointed associate director at the York Theatre Royal, York and directed occasionally at the Leeds Playhouse in Yorkshire and at the Bournemouth Repertory Theatre on the English south coast. In October 1972 she directed T. S. Eliot's Murder in the Cathedral in York Minster as part of that cathedral's 500th anniversary.

Despite a permanent move from RADA to the United States at the end of the 1970s, Shapiro returned to the academy occasionally as a guest director.

== United States and the Juillard School ==
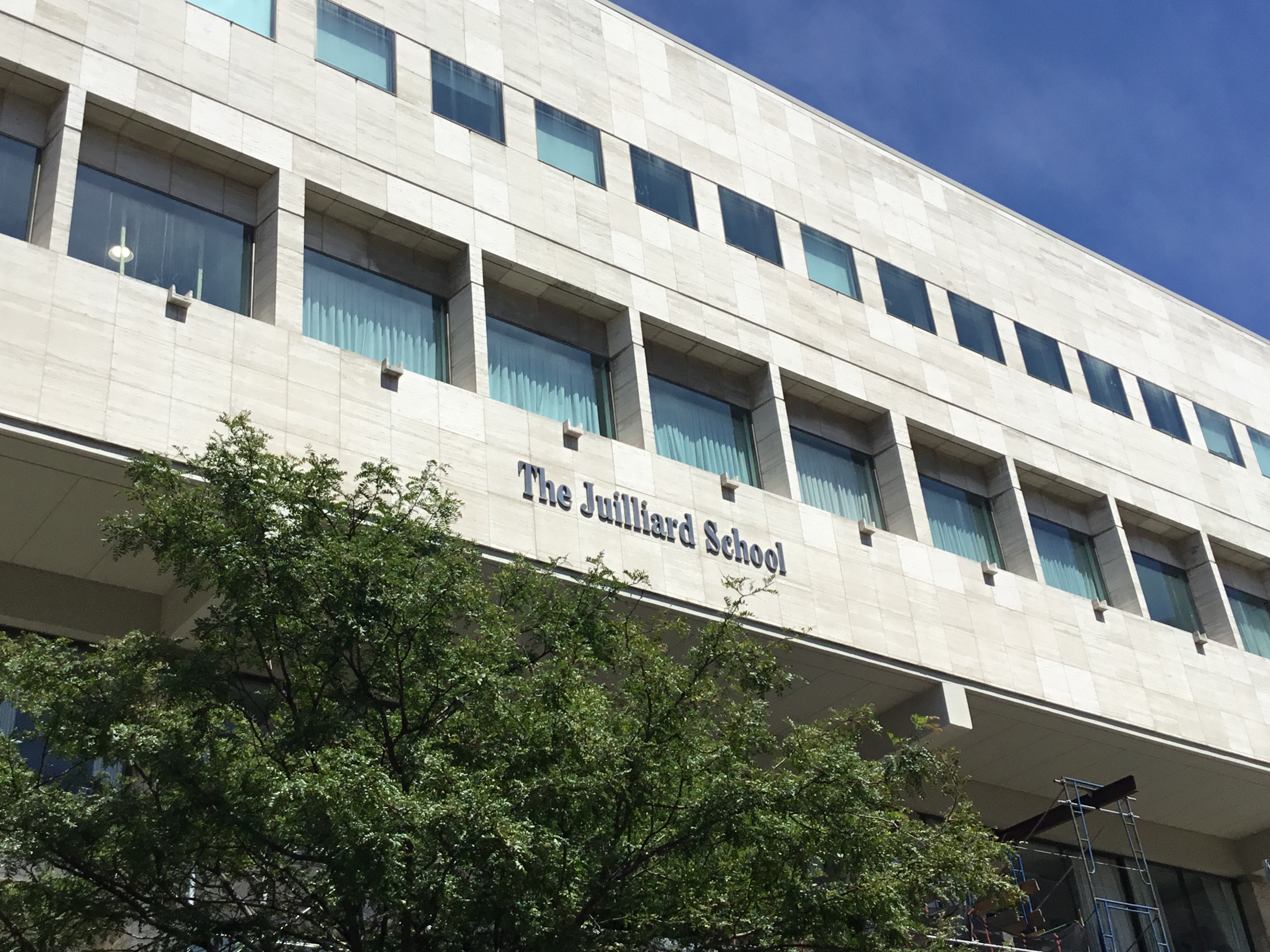
Juilliard School, New York

In the mid-1970s Shapiro was invited to teach and direct in the United States. She spoke about the move in an interview in 2002. "RADA had a summer school for young people, but also for teachers at various universities and colleges. I always taught the teaching group, and they kept saying to me 'Why don't you come to the States?'. Then one morning I woke up and thought, 'Why don't I go?". Shapiro got in touch with a friend who worked at the Juilliard School, a private performing arts conservatory in New York City, USA. Through that contact she met the then artistic director of the school's Drama Division, Alan Schneider, when he was visiting London. He saw her work and in 1976 invited her to New York to direct Juilliard Drama Division second year students in Richard III as a rehearsal project. She had first directed Richard III seven years before at RADA. She accepted the invitation and stayed in New York with the production for three months.

When Shapiro was due to return to London Schneider asked her to step in to direct final year students in Athol Fugard's South African play Boesman and Lena whose director had had to leave the production after only one week. Shapiro remained in New York to carry out that task, after which the school asked her to stay longer. Shapiro consulted with Hugh Cruttwell (who had taken over as RADA principal some years previously) in London who said "you can stay, as long as you come back". She then for three years taught in both London and New York for six month periods in each city. "For a while, I was working at both Juilliard and at RADA; the best of both worlds, in a way."

When Michael Langham took over the Drama Division at Juilliard in 1979 he wanted Shapiro to be there full-time, so she made the decision to relinquish her place on RADA's staff (though for the rest of her life she continued to direct there as an occasional guest) and she was appointed full-time to the faculty of the Juilliard Drama Division which by 1979 had a reputation as America's pre-eminent acting programme.

Shapiro settled permanently in New York and remained there for 43 years, until her death, establishing herself from 1983 in an eighth–floor Upper West Side apartment on the corner of Riverside Drive and West 84th Street in Manhattan overlooking the Hudson River. Shapiro also bought a small 1985–built townhouse in the town of Rhinebeck 100 miles north of Manhattan, up the Hudson River. She sold this house in 2015.

Shapiro's work with the Juilliard Drama Division, similar to her experience at RADA, involved teaching, mentoring and directing acting students, the two dozen or so chosen each year from any of up to 2,000 applicants for a four–year course. Among the many students who came under her influence at Juilliard and who have since become familiar faces on stage, film and television were Viola Davis, Greg Jbara, Val Kilmer (at the time the youngest person to be admitted to the Drama Division), Kevin Spacey (though he did not graduate) Jessica Chastain, and Kelly McGillis who, struggling with her key role in the 1985 film Witness, "in the deep of the night ... calls her old acting teacher, Eve Shapiro, who says, "Trust yourself, Kelly. Live the life of this woman and forget you'."

In her time at Juilliard Shapiro directed more than 20 major drama productions with third and final year acting students, among them several plays by George Bernard Shaw (You Never Can Tell, Getting Married, Heartbreak House, Man and Superman, Misalliance, and Major Barbara), three by Anton Chekhov (Uncle Vanya, The Seagull, and Three Sisters), some classical fare like John Gay's The Beggar's Opera, Henrik Ibsen's The Lady From the Sea and Hedda Gabler, Ivan Turgenev's A Month in the Country, The Winter's Tale and Richard II by William Shakespeare and Oscar Wilde's The Importance of Being Earnest. There was a sprinkling of more modern works, including Another Part of the Forest by Lillian Hellman, C. P. Taylor's And a Nightingale Sang, Artaud at Rodez by Charles Marowitz, and - a favourite of Shapiro's - Caryl Churchill's Top Girls. Of her production of Top Girls, "a richly complex study of bourgeois feminism", Shapiro relished "the intense positive atmosphere of rehearsals due to the deep connection the women have with the work". As well as working with third and final year students, Shapiro directed some 15 or so major drama rehearsal projects with first and second year students between 1976 and 1988.

In 1988, Juilliard's then-president, Joseph W. Polisi, asked Shapiro to direct an opera. The work chosen for the Juilliard Opera Center production was The Crucible by Robert Ward (based on Arthur Miller's 1953 play of the same name), its first New York presentation for 20 years. "As directed by Eve Shapiro," wrote John Rockwell in The New York Times, "...the opera unfurls like a Brechtian morality play." Following the success of The Crucible, Shapiro was invited to join Juillard's Opera faculty, relinquishing her place on the Drama staff (though she continued to direct one major drama there every year as a guest Master Director for the next 10 years). Over the ensuing 30 years Shapiro directed numerous operas for the Vocal Arts Division including, notably, Così fan tutte by Wolfgang Amadeus Mozart, Susannah by Carlisle Floyd, Gioachino Rossini's La Cenerentola, Eugene Onegin by Pyotr Ilyich Tchaikovsky, Die Fledermaus by Johann Strauss II, Bedrich Smetana's The Bartered Bride, and Benjamin Britten's A Midsummer Night's Dream and The Rape of Lucretia.

As well as directing, Shapiro continued as an acting teacher in the Vocal Arts Department, but now working with students of opera rather than drama and helping them to integrate dramatic and musical ideas. Shapiro once stated:

"Opera singers formerly didn't place so much importance on acting; singing was the most important thing. But now, opera has changed ...The challenge is getting people to move more freely onstage and to inhabit the role, not just demonstrate who you are."

In 2007, under the leadership of Juilliard's then new Director of Opera Studies, Stephen Wadsworth, and with Mary Birnbaum, associate director, Shapiro helped to build a new version of the Vocal Arts' Artists Diploma programme focused intensively on the art and craft of acting. She continued in this rôle, combined with her regular direction of operas, until her retirement.

Among the many students in the Vocal Arts Division whose acting benefitted from Shapiro's teaching were Paul Appleby, Julia Bullock, Catherine Hancock, Isabel Leonard, Mariateresa Magisano, Erin Morley, Makiko Narumi, Takaoki Onishi, and Susanna Phillips.

As well as her continuing commitment to the Vocal Arts Division and her regular productions for the Drama Division, Shapiro found time for a variety of extra-curricular work opportunities.

In the early 2000s, Shapiro directed a number of productions for The Acting Company, the major touring classical theatre company in the US which was founded in 1972 by Juilliard Drama Division director John Houseman and Administrator Margot Harley and still casts broadly from young Juilliard drama graduates. Shapiro directed three major Shakespeare plays for the company: Macbeth, The Taming of the Shrew, and in 2004 Richard III. Harley said Shapiro's passion for Richard III, her first production for Juilliard 28 years before, drove its production. "Eve chose this play, it was her decision to do it," Harley said. "I wouldn’t have done it if someone hadn’t had a passion for it. And also a willingness to do it with a young company – not everyone is willing to gamble on young actors."

Shapiro also worked regularly with the Bard College Conservatory of Music in Annandale-on-Hudson, New York, which launched a graduate program in Vocal Arts in 2006 under the leadership of American soprano Dawn Upshaw. With a second home at Rhinebeck, conveniently close to Bard College, Shapiro joined the Vocal Arts faculty, teaching in the acting workshop and also conducting director's master classes.

In 2010, at the request of a former acting student of Shapiro's, Eve Annenberg, who was directing and producing the film Romeo and Juliet in Yiddish, Shapiro coached inexperienced actors Melissa Weisz, who played Juliet, and two reformed "ethically challenged" young Hasidic men Laser Weiss and Mendel Zafir, who played Romeo and Benvolio respectively. Despite being tipped off about their shady past Shapiro was charmed by the two men, telling the New York Daily News: "They have charisma and that's something you cannot teach. You either have it or you don't." Shapiro was credited as the film's dramaturge and script editor.

In 2012 Shapiro returned to RADA in London to guest direct You Never Can Tell by George Bernard Shaw and again in 2016 to direct The Beggar's Opera by John Gay, with the help of musicians from the Royal Academy of Music.

Towards the end of her working life, Shapiro was awarded two honours. In 2001 as a graduate and former academic staff member she was formally elected an Associate of the Royal Academy of Dramatic Art in London and in 2017 she was presented with the Juilliard President's Medal. The medal honours "individuals who have made an indelible impact on the arts and serve as significant role models at Juilliard and in the broader performing arts community".

Shapiro was a noticeably diminutive woman, in her prime being at most 59 inches (1.5 metres) tall and even shorter in her old age. She was affectionately described by one of her colleagues as "a tiny Titan".

In declining health, Shapiro retired from active professional duties at Juilliard in the summer of 2020 at the age of 90, and was awarded the title of director emerita.

== Later life ==
Throughout her career, first at RADA and then at Juilliard, Shapiro built and preserved sustaining and often loving relationships with many of her students. In a video interview at Juilliard in 2016 Shapiro said, "the wonderful thing about teaching is you never know how many lives you touch."

In 2002 she outlined her views on teaching drama to young people:

"With young actors you know that maybe they couldn't have done it without you. It's not that you give young people talent, but you are able to sense the deep resources within people and find a way to make them feel they can do anything. That means understanding them, and having faith and, I think, humanity."

Some students found Shapiro difficult to work with, but on the whole she was held in high regard, viewed with occasional trepidation, and often loved by her students. The British actor Michael Simkins, in his autobiography, recalled his first meeting with Shapiro at RADA:

"The door opens and in walks a natty little South African woman in her early fifties with a weatherbeaten face and dyed black hair. Eve Shapiro has a crisp, businesslike approach, which suggests formal cordiality just above a steely core."

A Juilliard Vocal Arts student, Devon Guthrie, recalled that "Eve was one of the reasons why I chose to study at Juilliard ... To this day I use the techniques and wisdom she taught."

Many faculty colleagues appreciated Shapiro's talents. Hugh Cruttwell, John Fernald's successor as principal of RADA during Shapiro's time there, said of her: "She has a remarkable gift of getting the best out of each actor. Group after group has found her a uniquely valuable teacher and director." Stephen Wadsworth, Director of the Artist Diploma in Opera Studies program at Juilliard, celebrated Shapiro's "impeccable taste, deep knowledge of the dramatic repertoire ... her wit, her love of talent, and her utterly original and masterly pedagogy — incredibly gentle yet firm ..."

During a brief retirement before the end of her life, Shapiro was filmed in her apartment by her former acting student turned film director Eve Annenberg who was making a documentary about three women friends of much the same age, Elizabeth Smith, Margot Harley and Shapiro, all of whom had worked together at Juilliard. Shapiro's health was failing. "The moment I had cameras in place, it seemed, Eve became aphasic," wrote Annenberg in 2023. "Which was especially tragic as she had wanted so much to go on record about her beloved, late partner, Lois."

Shapiro died in New York on 1 December 2022 at the age of 92.
