= AKSamba =

- Origin: Auckland, New Zealand
- Genres: world percussion
- Instrument: drums
- Years active: 2002–present
- Website: http://www.aksamba.org.nz

AKSamba is a percussion group based in Auckland, New Zealand. While predominantly inspired by Brazilian rhythms, the group's music also incorporates global rhythms such as drum'n'bass, funk and disco.

Formed at the end of 2002, the group has around 50 members covering a wide age range and from many different nationalities. Its mestres are Darren Cottingham and Jo Odds. Band affairs are coordinated by several committees. AKSamba regularly works with visiting percussionists from around the world such as Mohamed Bangoura, Cabello, Monobloco and Ricardo Ó Rosinha.

AKSamba performs in a variety of settings including festivals, parades, and community and corporate events around New Zealand's North Island. It also runs workshops and introductory percussion courses aimed at the public. AKSamba is one of eight large samba groups in New Zealand, the others being Unidos de Aotearoa (Auckland), Wellington Batucada, Tauranga Samba, Samba De Sol (Nelson), Sambatron (Hamilton), Samba ao Vento (Palmerston North) and Bay Batucada (Napier). There are also smaller, informal pagode groups and Brazilian-influenced groups around New Zealand that incorporate the instruments of the larger Rio-style baterias.
