= Ronald Settle =

British composer, pianist, teacher, writer and examiner (1909–1998)

Ronald Coulter Settle
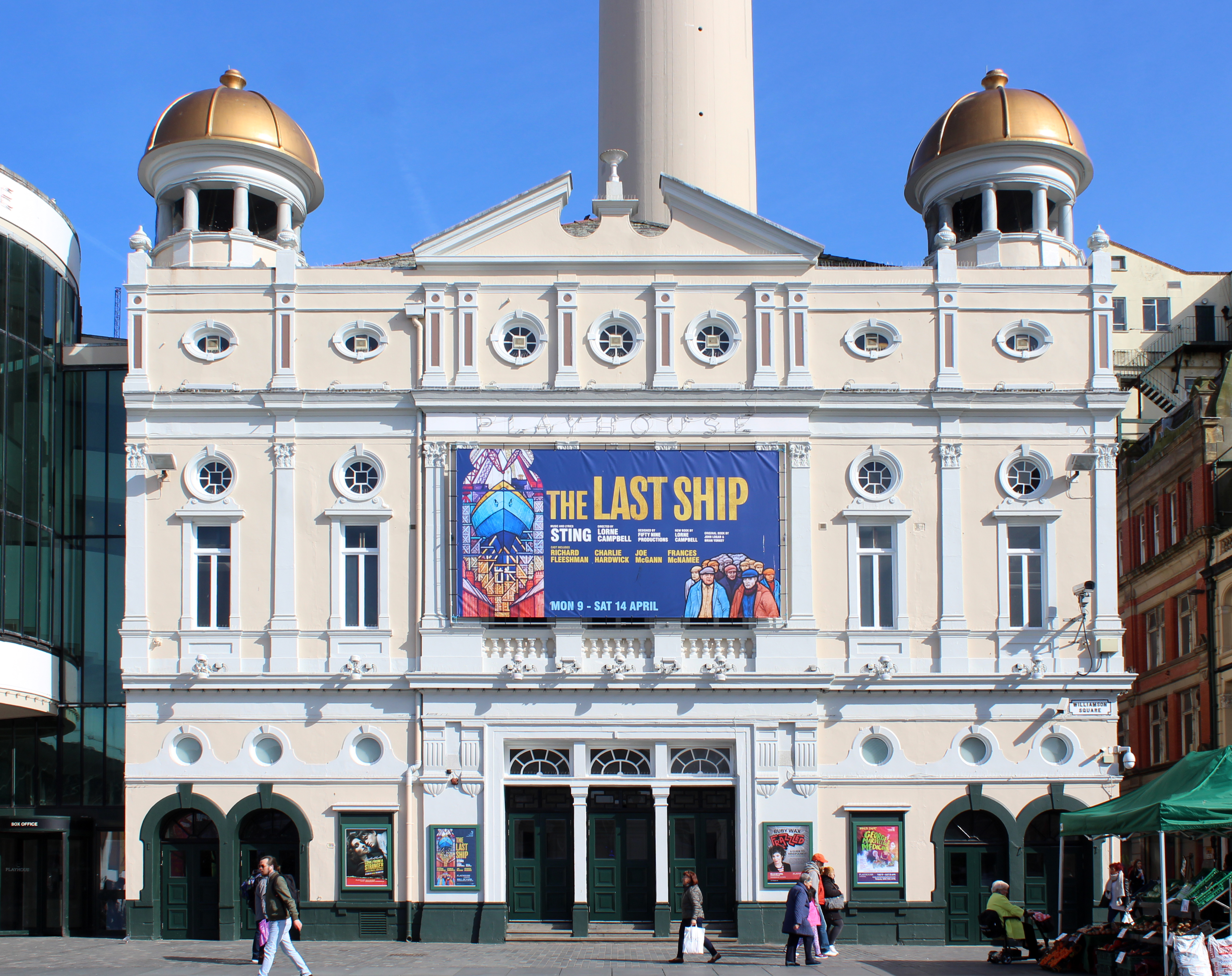
- Settle was Musical Director at the Liverpool Playhouse 1944-1970.
- Born: Ronald Coulter Settle; 21 June 1909; Wirral, Cheshire, England
- Died: 11 July 1998 (aged 89); Hooton, Cheshire, England
- Years active: 1930-1998
- Spouse: Margaret
- Children: 2

Ronald Coulter Settle (21 June 1909 – 11 July 1998) was an English composer, pianist, teacher, writer and examiner.

== Education ==
Settle was born in Wirral, Cheshire on 21 June 1909. He was educated at the Royal Manchester College of Music, where he studied pianoforte as a student of Frank Merrick.

== Liverpool Playhouse ==
Settle was musical director at the Liverpool Playhouse for twenty-six years from 1944 until 1970, when cost saving measures dictated that two pianists were too expensive and that recorded music would be played instead.

Joan Ovens joined Settle as a second pianist and they would play duets before a performance, as well as during the shows and intervals.

Settle wrote incidental music for numerous plays. For example, during the 1944–45 season, this included Shakespeare's Hamlet and Ben Jonson's The Alchemist.

Willard Stoker's play, ‘I Remember, I Remember’, (with music composed by Settle), was staged at the Playhouse in the week commencing 14 June 1960 and starred Rita Tushingham, who had assumed the position of student Assistant Stage Manager with the Liverpool Repertory Company in 1958, a company which presented stage plays at the Liverpool Playhouse.

Settle also arranged music by other composers to suit Playhouse performances and the theatre's two pianos. This included H. Fraser Simson's music to Toad of Toad Hall by A A Milne and based on Kenneth Grahame’s The Wind in the Willows, performed in the week commencing 23 December 1958.

Writing in 1961, Settle pointed out that, during the preceding seventeen years, his and Ovens’s music programmes included almost the entire repertoire of published two-piano works and covered a wide range of styles, including Bach, Scarlatti, boogie-woogie and pop.

In his 26 years at the theatre, Settle provided the music for more than 250 productions, wrote five musicals and three revues.

In 1991 he returned to the Playhouse to perform in a concert to help prevent the theatre from closing.

== Bluecoat Chambers ==
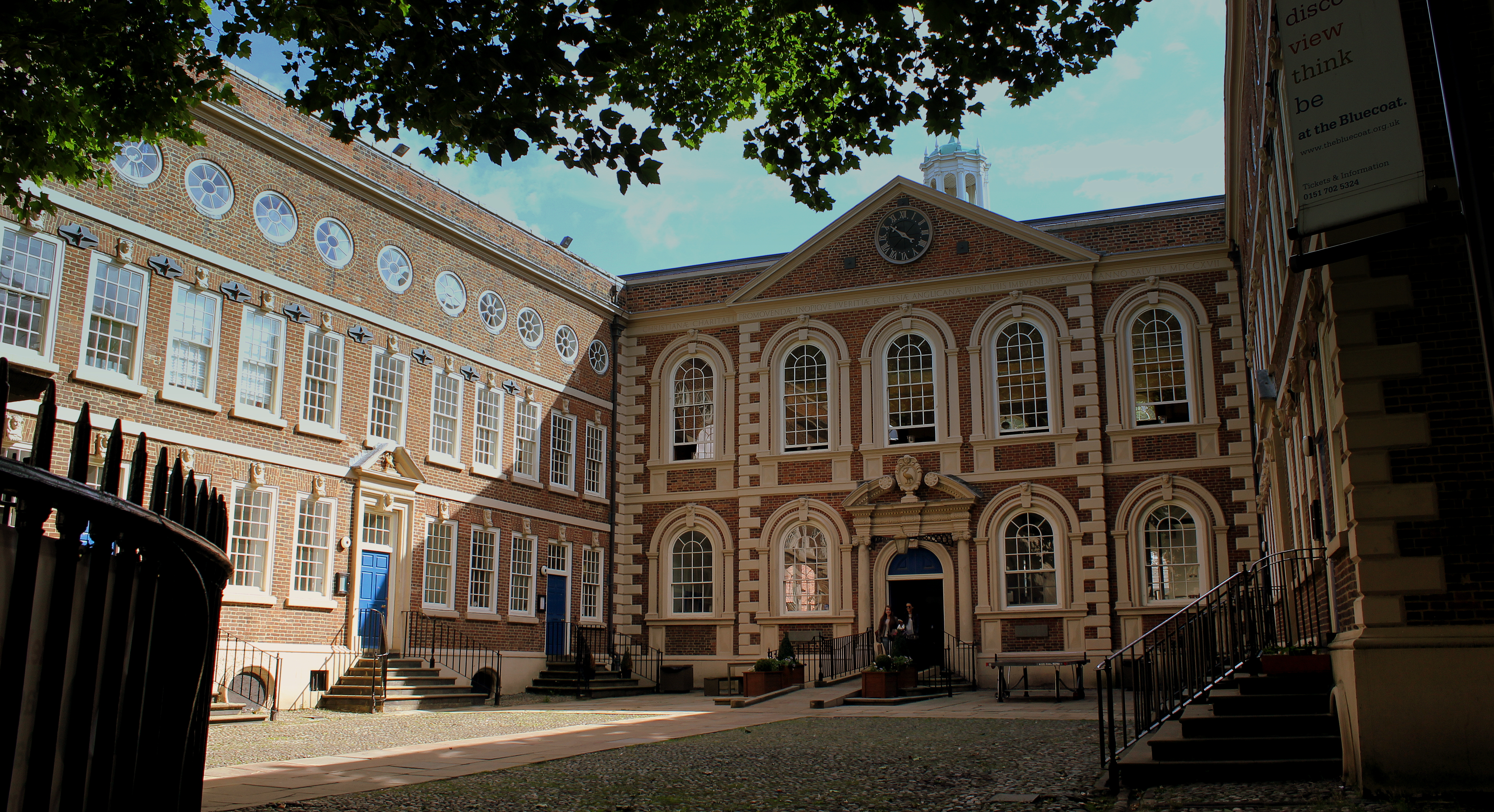
Settle had a studio at Liverpool’s Bluecoat Chambers in School Lane.

Settle had a studio for many years at the Bluecoat Chambers in Liverpool, the UK’s first Arts Centre.

It was here that he taught piano and composition to students, and where practical music examinations took place for the Liverpool examinations centre of the London College of Music.

British composer Ian Venables studied piano with Settle at the Bluecoat Chambers between 1971 and 1977.

His Bechstein piano was loved by many of Settle’s students and, after his death, found a new home through one of the students who had enjoyed playing it.

It was in Settle’s studio that a “remarkable discovery” was made. Having at one time been a pupil of a Russian pianist, it was while clearing out a cupboard at the Bluecoat that he found an original manuscript by Tchaikovsky.

== Works ==
The book 'Music in the theatre' was written by Settle and published in London by Herbert Jenkins on 1 January 1957. In her 2018 book ‘Collaborative Composition at the RSC’, Professor Millie Taylor says that “an interesting picture emerges about the practice of composing music for theatre” in this work by Settle.

He wrote the song ‘Shadows’ for Joan Hammond (performed by Cheryl Barker on Melba Recordings' CD Pure Diva released in 2011).

Music at the Playhouse - Playhouse Golden Jubilee brochure, published 1961.

== Personal life ==
Settle married a singer, Margaret, and they had two children - a daughter Anne and one other, who went on to provide eight grandchildren and fifteen great-grandchildren for the couple.

’The Art of Murder” (1992), a book by Jonathon Goodman, was dedicated to Settle and his wife.
