= Maud Carpenter =

British theatre manager (1892–1967)

Maud Carpenter (Liverpool Playhouse photograph)

Maud Farrington OBE (née Maud Carpenter; 19 March 1892 – 18 June 1967) was a British theatre manager, who was the first woman to join the board of the Liverpool Playhouse in 1945.

== Early years and education ==
Born in Liverpool, Maud was the daughter of George Carpenter, a bricklayer, and his wife Mary Jane. She was educated in Liverpool.

== Career ==
Carpenter began working in the box-office of Kelly's Theatre in Paradise Street, Liverpool. She joined the Liverpool Playhouse in its first, experimental season in 1911, working as a secretary and an assistant, before becoming its Administrator in 1922. She was appointed its business manager in 1923, a year after William Armstrong was appointed the theatre's director, and they formed a successful partnership until his retirement in 1944. Carpenter remained the manager of the theatre until her retirement on 8 June 1962, and served on the board of the Playhouse until her death in 1967.

Carpenter was the Founder President of Soroptimist International of Liverpool at its inauguration on 25 February 1927. She was then 34 years old. During her year of office, the Club campaigned vigorously to raise funds for the new Women's Hospital which was then being built in Liverpool. During the Second World War she was heavily involved in the establishment of a Club, the Angel Club, in Liverpool, staffed by Soroptimists and their friends, providing accommodation for members of H.M. Forces passing through the city; 350,000 service personnel used this facility during the war.

Carpenter was a powerful influence on the theatre scene in Liverpool. Though she reportedly knew little about theatre and often got confused with the titles of plays, her enthusiasm and promotion of the theatre were well known locally, earning her the nickname "the Lady Mayoress of Liverpool". During The Blitz of the Second World War, she would reputedly stand on the roof of the Playhouse yelling "Don't bomb my theatre. Don't bomb my theatre". She once scolded Anthony Hopkins when he turned up at the theatre wearing jeans and an open neck shirt instead of dressing formally. The author Sheila Hancock describes Carpenter as a "local powerhouse". Carpenter married Dr David Farrington in 1919; she died in 1967.
