= Al-Rahma Mosque, Liverpool =

Mosque in Liverpool, England, United Kingdom

Al-Rahma Mosque
- مسجد الرحمة
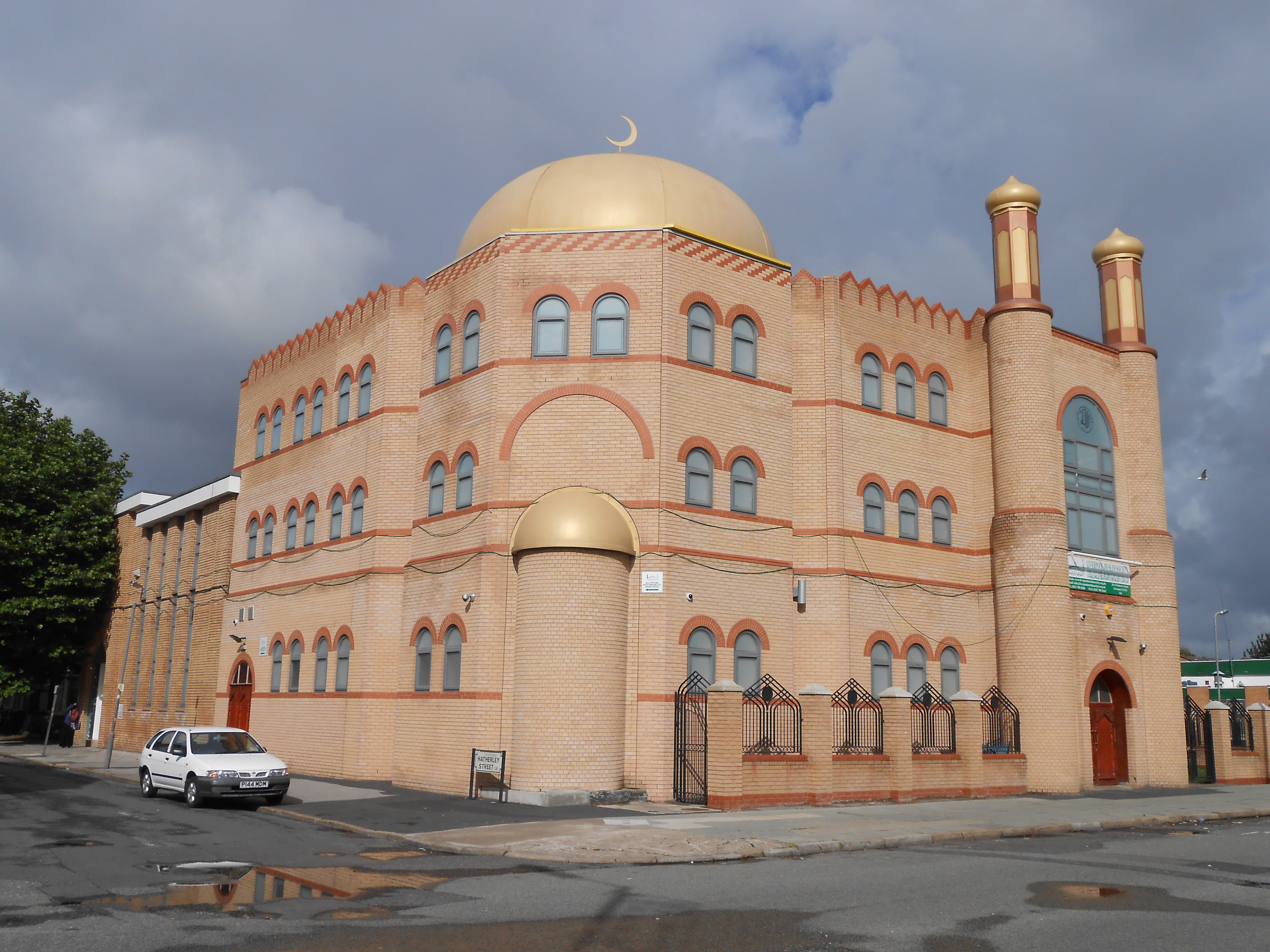
- Al-Rahma Mosque in 2013

- Location of the mosque in England

Religion
- Affiliation: Sunni Islam
- Ecclesiastical or organisational status: Mosque
- Status: Active

Location
- Location: Toxteth, Liverpool, England
- Country: United Kingdom
- Administration: Liverpool Muslim Society
- Coordinates: 53°23′39.4″N 2°57′38.3″W

Architecture
- Type: Mosque architecture
- Established: 1953 (as a community)
- Completed: 1974

Specifications
- Capacity: c. 2,500 worshippers
- Dome: One
- Minaret: Two

Website
- liverpoolmuslimsociety.org.uk

The Al-Rahma Mosque (Arabic: مسجد الرحمة, romanized: Masjid ar-Raḥmah, lit. 'Mosque of Mercy') is a Sunni mosque located on Hatherley Street in Toxteth, Liverpool, England, in the United Kingdom. The mosque can accommodate between 2,000 and 2,500 worshippers and serves as the main place of worship and focus point for Liverpool's Muslim population, which numbered over 25,000 in the 2021 United Kingdom census.

== History ==
The Liverpool Muslim Society was founded in 1953 by the late Al-Haj Ali Hizzam, a member of Liverpool's Muslim community. The Society originally operated from a room in his house where prayer services were held. The Society office is based at the mosque.

The current mosque was built in 1974, ten years after applying for development consent from the city's planning department.

The current building is used primarily by the Liverpool's Yemenis, Syrians, and Somalis who constitute the vast majority of the city's Muslim population.

== See also ==
- Islam in England
- List of mosques in the United Kingdom
- Liverpool Muslim Institute
- Abdullah Quilliam
