= Liverpool Playhouse =

Theatre in Liverpool, England

- Star Music Hall, Star Theatre of Varieties, Liverpool Repertory Theatre
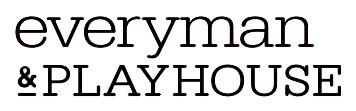

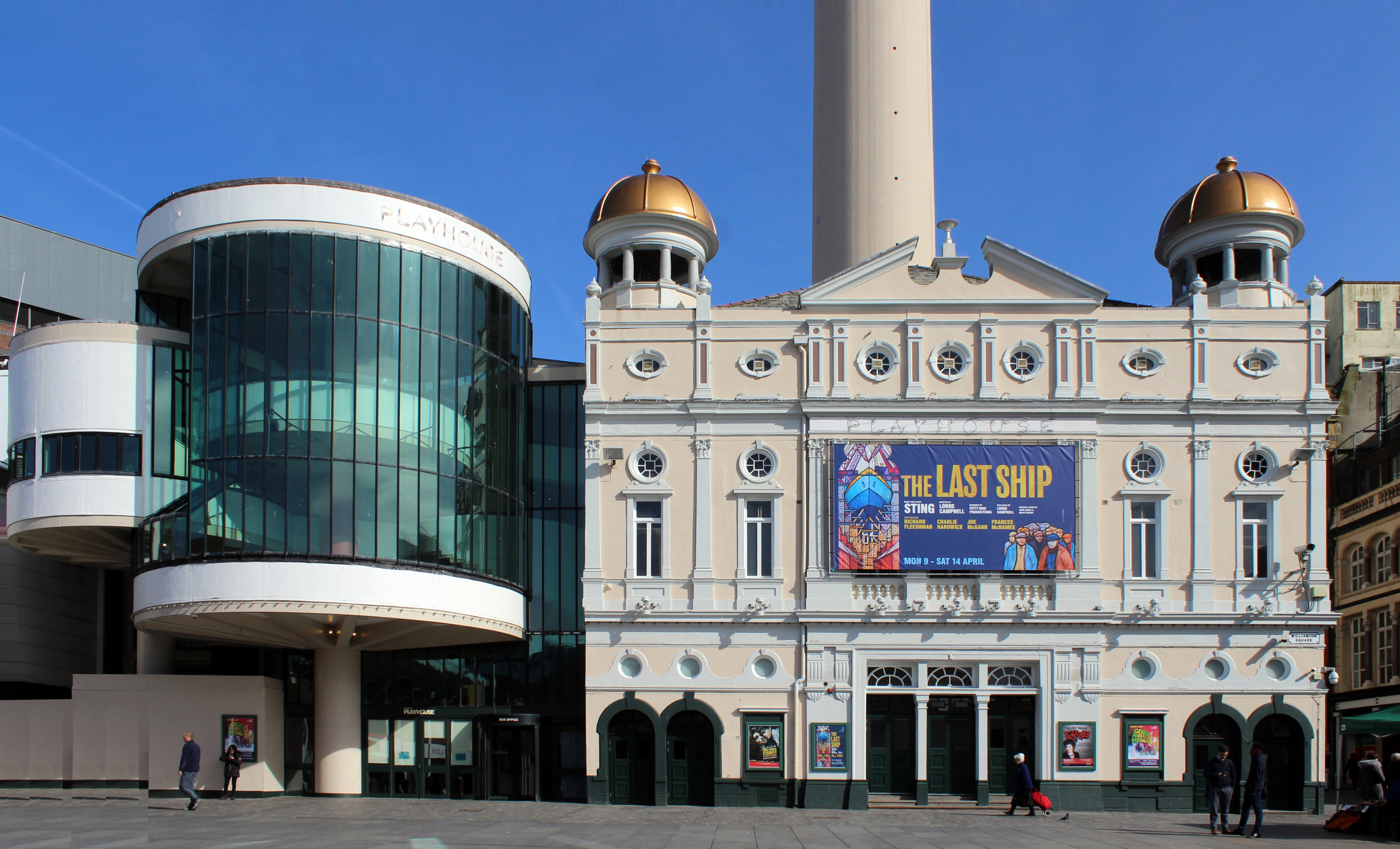
- Liverpool Playhouse

- Location in Merseyside
- Address: Williamson Square; Liverpool; England
- Coordinates: 53.4064°N 2.9826°W
- Owner: Liverpool and Merseyside Theatres Trust
- Operator: Liverpool and Merseyside Theatres Trust
- Type: Theatre
- Designation: Listed Building Grade II*

Construction
- Opened: 1866
- Architects: Edward Davies, Harry Percival, Stanley Adshead, Hall, O'Donahue and Wilson

The Liverpool Playhouse is a theatre in Williamson Square in the city of Liverpool, England. It originated in 1866 as a music hall, and in 1911 developed into a repertory theatre. As such it nurtured the early careers of many actors and actresses, some of whom went on to achieve national and international reputations. Architectural changes have been made to the building over the years; the most recent was in 1968 when a modern-style extension was added to the north of the theatre. In 1999 a trust was formed, joining the management of the Playhouse with that of the Everyman Theatre.

== History ==
The present theatre on the site was designed by Edward Davies, and opened in 1866. It replaced an earlier theatre called the Star Concert Hall. The present theatre was originally named the Star Music Hall. In 1895 its name was changed to the Star Theatre of Varieties. The theatre was improved in 1898 by Harry Percival with a new auditorium and foyer, and electricity was installed. In 1911 the Liverpool Repertory Theatre Limited was established, with Basil Dean as its "controller and producer". The company could not afford to build a new theatre, and bought the Star Theatre for £28,000 (equivalent to £2,850,000 in 2025). This made it the first repertory in Britain to own the freehold of a theatre. The company spent a further £4,000 (equivalent to £410,000 in 2025) on redesigning and modernising the theatre. The auditorium and the basement foyer were redesigned by Stanley Adshead, the Professor of Civic Design at the Liverpool School of Architecture.

The theatre was for many years managed by Maud Carpenter, while Ronald Settle was Musical Director from 1945 to 1971. The theatre was renamed the Liverpool Repertory Theatre, and in 1916 renamed again, as the Liverpool Playhouse. Minor structural alterations were made to the theatre in 1961 and in 1966. In 1968 a modern-style extension was added to the north of the theatre to accommodate new foyers, bars, dressing rooms and a workshop. In the 1990s the theatre company went into liquidation. In 1999 the Liverpool and Merseyside Theatres Trust Limited was established as a charity, and the theatre re-opened. It is managed jointly with the Everyman Theatre by Liverpool City Council.

== Artistes ==
From 1922 to 1944 the director of the theatre and the repertory company was William Armstrong. According to The Times:

His skill in play selection and production, his eye for good acting, and his happy combination of enterprise and prudence in business managemenl commended him more and more to the supporters of repertory. He put on a very varied list of significant pieces by modern British dramatists … The Playhouse under his management enlisted and trained actors and actresses with extraordinary success, so that in time the West End stage was full of its graduates – of whom Diana Wynyard, Richard Bird, and Robert Donat are typical names.

Other future stars who learned their craft at the Playhouse under Armstrong included Michael Redgrave, Rex Harrison and Robert Flemyng. Noël Coward and Gertrude Lawrence worked with the company as child actors. Other artistes who gained experience at the theatre include Lilian Braithwaite, Cecil Parker, John Gregson, Clive Brook, C. Aubrey Smith, Richard Burton, Patricia Routledge, Anthony Hopkins and Richard Briers.

== Architecture ==
=== Older section ===
The exterior of the older part of the theatre is stuccoed, and it has a slate roof. Its entrance front faces Williamson Square. It has seven bays and is in three storeys. The central three bays project forward and are surmounted by a broken pediment. On the ground floor the central bays contain three entrances, separated by pillars, which lead to a recessed porch. Over each entrance is an architrave containing a fanlight. The lateral bays contain two round-headed and one flat-headed entrance on each side, over which are three blind round windows. In the middle storey, the bays are separated by pilasters. The three central bays each have a balustrade and a window with a tympanum containing a roundel. Each of the three lateral bays contains a window with a cornice, and a round window above it. Along the top storey are oculi between panelled pilasters. On the summit of each of the two lateral bays is a cupola on a short Tuscan colonnade. Inside the older part of the theatre are two balconies supported by cast iron columns. The interior is decorated in Greek Revival style.

=== Newer section ===
The newer section is constructed in concrete, and largely faced by glass. On the ground floor are entrance doors. Above this, the building is based around three cylinders. The largest of these starts at the first floor and rises through two storeys. It is cantilevered from a central column. To the left is a smaller cylinder, cantilevered from a separate column, interlocking with the larger cylinder. Inside the whole is a hollow column containing the stairs.

=== Assessment and critique ===
The theatre is recorded in the National Heritage List for England as a designated Grade II* listed building, having been designated on 14 March 1975. In its description, the list quotes the Architects' Journal of 1968 which says of the older section that it is "significant as an early and rare work by one of the pioneers of the Liverpool School of Architecture, in the Grecian style favoured by the school at that date", and of the newer section that it is "a brilliant concept, joyously realised, which exploits asymmetrical volumes and ever varying spaces yet achieves unity and also balance with the adjoining Victorian façade". In the Buildings of England series the architectural historians Richard Pollard and Nikolaus Pevsner say of the newer section that it is "a spectacular composition" which creates an atmosphere of excitement and anticipation, exactly right for a theatre foyer".

== See also ==
- Architecture of Liverpool
