= Festinho =

- Genre: Folk, rock, hip hop, reggae, indie rock, electronica, blues, techno, house, electronic, jazz, acoustic music, pop
- Dates: last weekend in August (3 days)
- Locations: Bedfordshire, UK
- Years active: 2005-2010
- Website: festinho.com

Festinho was a small, three-day music and arts festival, last held at Hinwick House, Hinwick, Bedfordshire during the August Bank Holiday weekend of 2010.

Very much inspired by early Big Chill Festivals and picnics in the English countryside, Festinho is driven by a hard-working team of volunteers, many of whom have in various configurations and incarnations been putting on events, DJing, VJing, and festivalling together for years. Many of the performers give their time for free so that as much money as possible goes straight to the ABC Trust.

== History ==
2010

Due to space limitations in the campsite at Kentwell Hall, Festinho had to find a new home in 2010, and were rewarded in their search by finding Hinwick House in Hinwick, Bedfordshire. This afforded the festival more room for camping, and an increased space for entertainment. Moreover, its unique nature and design meant that Festinho had an opportunity to rethink their approach to providing entertainment. Notable examples of this included the ability to use parts of Hinwick House itself to provide entertainment spaces, and a main stage spanning a small stream, situated inside a Grade II listed walled garden.

Festinho continued with its tried and tested formula of two live music stages, two DJ areas, a comedy and cabaret space, a healing zone (The Sanctuary), a children's areas hosted by Angel Gardens, capoeira demonstrations, a cinema space, a children's carnival and several bars and food and merchandise stalls. However, the 2010 event did not take place during the first week of September; instead, it moved forward to the last weekend in August. this is notable because this is a Bank Holiday weekend in the UK, and afforded Festinho the opportunity to provide entertainment until much later than usual on Sunday evening. Another key difference from previous years was the decision to open the campsite on Thursday evening instead of Friday afternoon. This allowed an expanded programme of music that started during Friday afternoon instead of Friday evening. The event was attended by over 3,200 people.

2009

Festinho continued its run at Kentwell Hall in 2009, and attracted over 2,500 people. It provided more food stalls, an expanded entertainment programme, and a children's area run by Angel Gardens.

2008

As the festival started to outgrow the space available in Yarnton, it moved in 2008 to Kentwell Hall in Long Melford, Suffolk. This afforded the event more room, and allowed it to incorporate an additional live music space, an expanded children's area, a healing zone, and a new cabaret and comedy tent hosted by Underbling & Vow. As well as providing more entertainment spaces, it also began to programme live music on the Friday evening as well as DJs, and finished on Sunday evening instead of Sunday afternoon. It was attended by around 1200 people.

2007

In 2007, the directorship of the event was handed over as the original organiser did not have the time to create the festival. It moved back to its original home of Yarnton, and changed its name to 'Festinho' - a nonsense word which alludes to the Brazilian Portuguese word 'Festinha', meaning 'small festival'. By this time, around 800 were attending the event, and it had expanded to incorporate an additional DJ area hosted by The Disco Shed, a children's area and an additional bar. It also took the decision to begin the music programming on a Friday evening, with a select few DJs welcoming people to the event.

2006

In 2006, the MiniChill moved to Marlow, Buckinghamshire, and followed the same pattern as the previous year; art, live music and DJs spread over 2 days, with guests arriving on Friday evening and departing on Sunday afternoon.

2004 / 2005

A private birthday party for one of the trustees of The ABC Trust was held on the first weekend in September 2004. A friend of the charity hosted the event on the grounds of their house in Yarnton, Oxfordshire. The party involved some live music and DJs, and guests were asked to donate money to the charity. The following year, the people who organised that party decided to sell tickets (by invitation only) to a party on the same weekend; they organised a live music stage, a DJ area and artwork over two days (Saturday and Sunday), and guests were allowed to bring tents for staying overnight. The money raised from ticket sales was donated to the charity, and the event was called 'Minichill'. The event was attended by around 350 people.

== Who they support ==
All profits from the event go to the ABC Trust, a UK-based charity that supports community art projects in Brazil geared towards developing skills and interests amongst less privileged children. Action for Brazil's Children Trust (ABC) is dedicated to helping the most vulnerable children and young people of Brazil. Every day, Brazilian children are forced to face the violence, hunger and isolation of life on the streets.

Recent figures estimate that over 7 million children live a life on the streets in some way. For many, this means occasional school, petty trading, begging and prostitution, only returning to their homes in the evening. Others have no home at all and must face the dangers of sleeping on the streets; they find themselves increasingly excluded from their own communities with no way back.

ABC Trust supports a variety of locally-run projects across Brazil, from counselling to medical care to film editing workshops, which give these children a second chance - helping them to transform their lives, and giving them hope for their futures. Over 3000 children and their families are reached every day through projects made possible by ABC supporters' donations.

ABC Trust is a UK-based organisation set up by Jimena Page, as founding trustee, and Led Zeppelin legend Jimmy Page, as founding patron. They have since been joined by a board of trustees and a group of patrons who lend a hand whenever possible.

== Bands, artists and performers ==
As an evolving creature, Festinho is different every year and thanks to a determined team, talented artists, and most of all a truly fantastic crowd, gets better and better. It's still very small compared to most festivals, and future plans are for Festinho to stay intimate, small and with a distinctly Brazilian flavour.

Previous bands and DJs that have appeared at Festinho include: Ugly Duckling, The Blockheads, British Sea Power, Crazy P, Max Cooper, Belleruche, The Bays, Eliza Carthy, Jim Moray, The Correspondents, The Leisure Society, Nancy Wallace, Gilles Peterson, Cosmo, Jon Hopkins, The Kleptones, Mixmaster Morris, Hint, Flevans, Andy Votel, Cut La Roc, Hexstatic and Jon Kennedy.

== Past festivals ==
In 2008 and 2009, Festinho was held at Kentwell Hall, a moated, mellow redbrick Tudor mansion in Long Melford, Suffolk. In 2007, Yarnton, Oxfordshire hosted the Festinho festival.
