= Williamson Square =

Square in the city centre of Liverpool, England

Coordinates: 53.4065413°N 2.983236°W

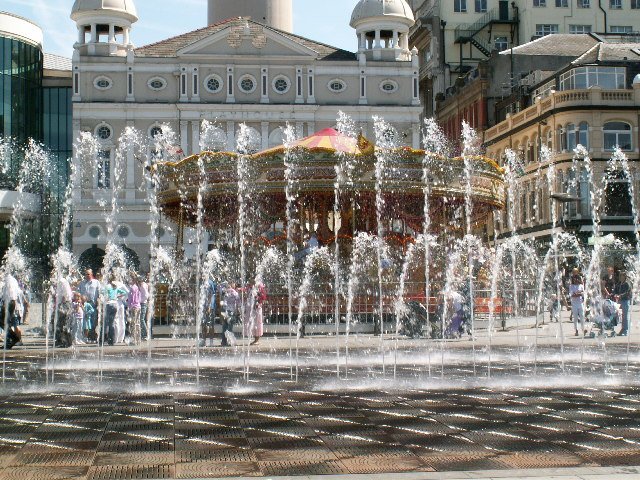
Williamson Square, Liverpool

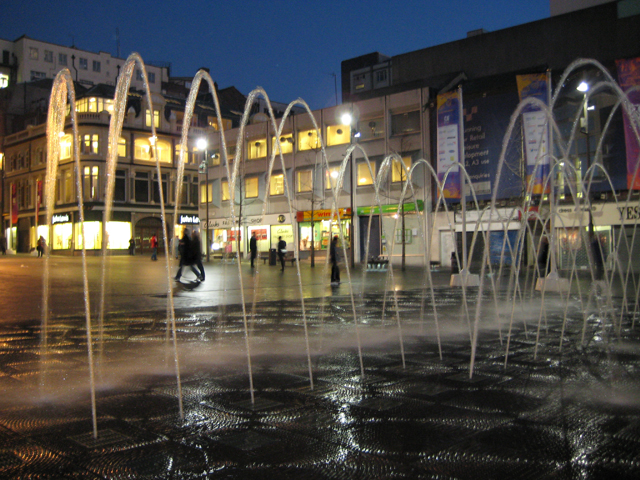
Fountains in Williamson Square at night

Williamson Square is in the city centre of Liverpool, England. It was initially laid out as a residential square in the 1745 by Mr Williamson. It originally only had buildings on the lower part and the other three parts were not covered.

The Liverpool Playhouse stands on the east side of the square, and the other sides are occupied by shops. Formerly the north side was occupied by the Theatre Royal, but this was demolished in 1965. The square also contained a fountain, consisting of 20 jets of water that could rise to a height of up to four metres. The fountain was controlled by a computer, and during the evenings was illuminated with coloured lights. However, as of 2026, the fountain no longer functions.
