= Sargento Pimenta =

Brazilian carnival parade

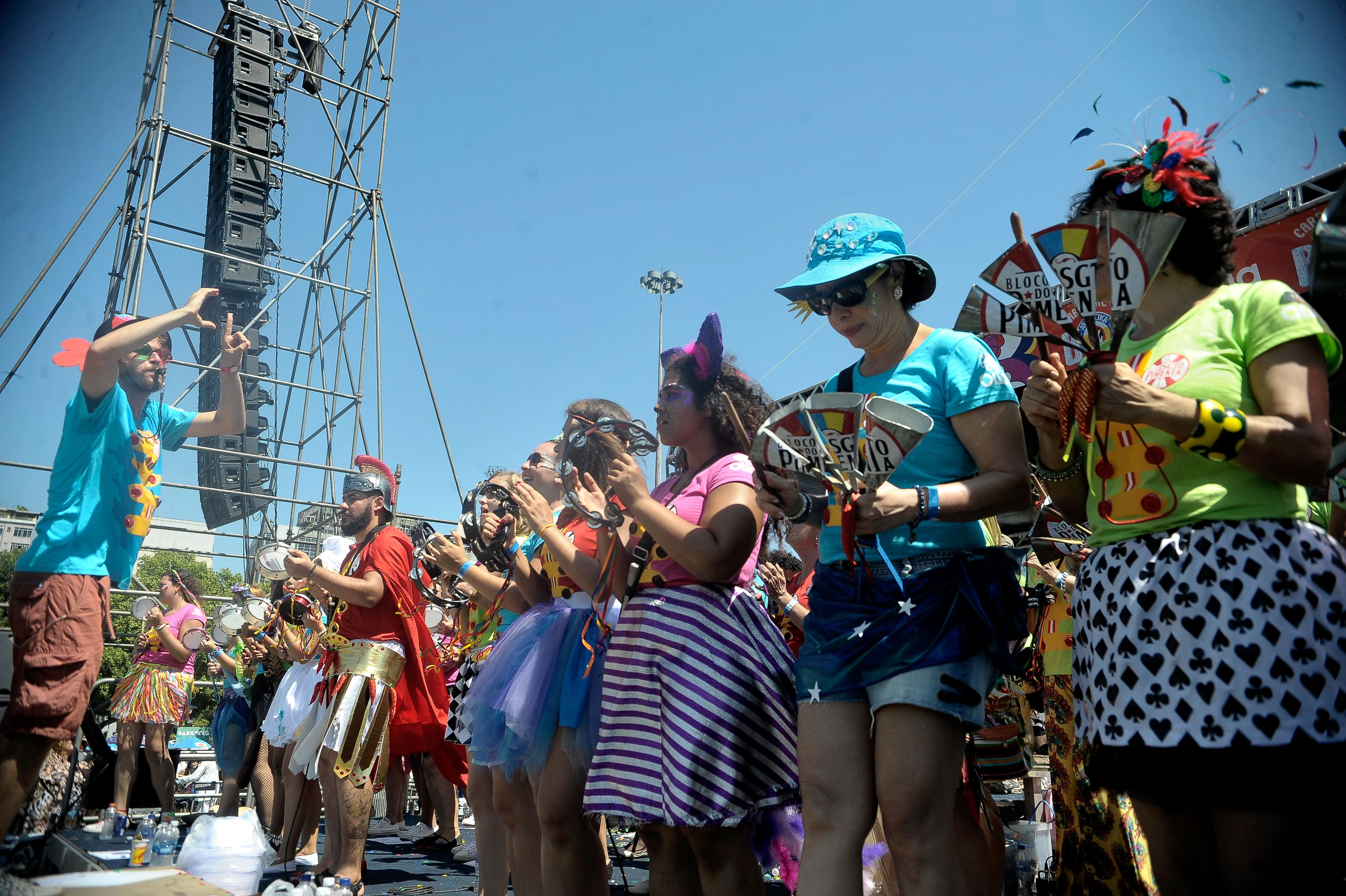
- Foundation: 2010
- Colors: Red, Yellow and Blue
- Symbol: Black pepper (Pimenta)
- Location: Flamengo Park, Rio de Janeiro, Brazil

Website
- http://www.blocodosargentopimenta.com.br

Sargento Pimenta is a Carnival block from Rio de Janeiro, Brazil. Founded in 2010, it parades in the Flamengo neighborhood, in the southern part of Rio de Janeiro. The carnival band plays songs by the British rock band The Beatles in the rhythm of carnival marches.

== History ==
In an interview with Band Folia, a program dedicated to covering Carnival on TV Bandeirantes, Donner, one of the founders of the Carnival street band, said that the group began with a conversation among friends: "We started in 2010 with a group of friends who were revelers, drunk in the street, who invented their own street band. Among several bizarre ideas, one was: let's pay tribute to The Beatles. It was a great idea."

The name is a reference to the album Sgt. Pepper's Lonely Hearts Club Band, and the group's repertoire consists mainly of covers of songs by the rock band The Beatles, performed with arrangements of samba, marchinha, maracatu, and other Brazilian rhythms. The name "Pimenta" refers to pepper in Portuguese.

In its first carnival, the debut took place in the Botafogo neighborhood. Due to the success of the first carnival block, the block left Botafogo and began to parade at Flamengo Park, a traditional postcard location in Rio de Janeiro. During the 2015 and 2016 carnivals, the street band gathered over 180,000 people at Flamengo Park. In 2017, the carnival block celebrated the 50th anniversary of the release of Sgt. Pepper's Lonely Hearts Club Band. To continue the celebration of its 50th anniversary, in December 2017, it released an album with reinterpretations of the album that gave rise to the band. Journalist and music critic Mauro Ferreira wrote in his blog on G1 that "all the songs were recreated within the Brazilian rhythmic universe, but with a concern for maintaining the original structure of the compositions."

Due to the COVID-19 pandemic, the group did not perform during the years 2021 and 2022. During the 2025 carnival, the parade attracted over 500,000 people. In addition to paying tribute to The Beatles, the band has also honored multiple Brazilian female artists such as Elis Regina, Rita Lee, and Cássia Eller.
