= Islam in England =

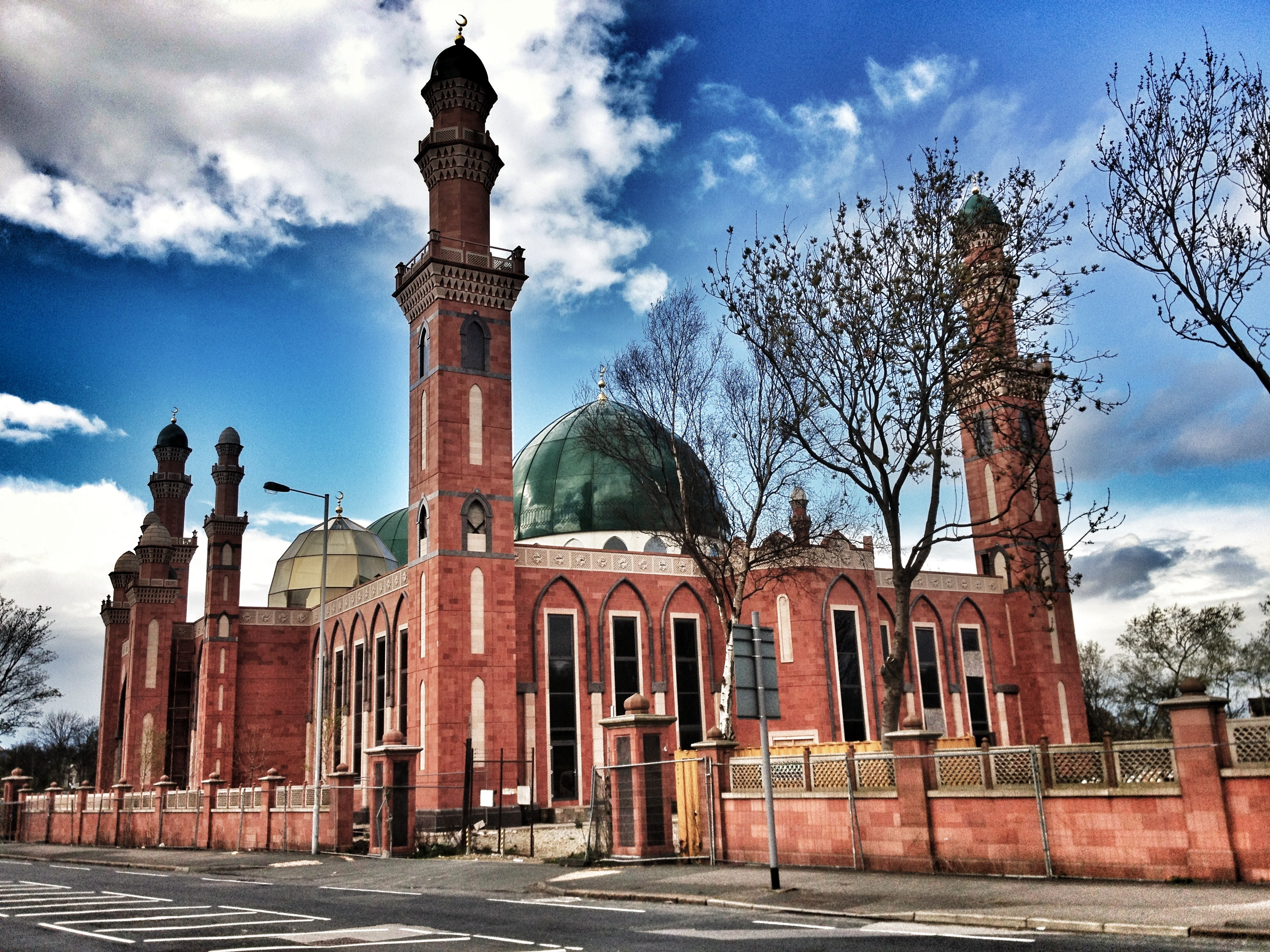
The Grand Mosque of Bradford is the largest mosque by capacity in the United Kingdom.

Islam is the second largest religion in England after Christianity. Most Muslims are immigrants from South Asia (in particular Bangladesh, Pakistan and India) or descendants of immigrants from that region. Many others are from Muslim-dominated regions such as the Middle East, Afghanistan, Malaysia and Somalia, and other parts of African countries such as Nigeria, Uganda and Sierra Leone. There are also many White Muslims in the country, most of which have Slavic and Balkan backgrounds (Bosnian, Albanian, Montenegrin, Kosovar etc.), as well as some ethnic English converts.

According to the 2011 census, 2.7 million Muslims lived in England and Wales, up by almost 1 million from the previous census, where they formed 5.0% of the general population and 9.1% of children under the age of five.

According to the latest 2021 United Kingdom census, 3,801,186 Muslims live in England, or 6.7% of the population. The Muslim population again grew by over a million compared to the previous census.

== History ==
=== Middle Ages ===
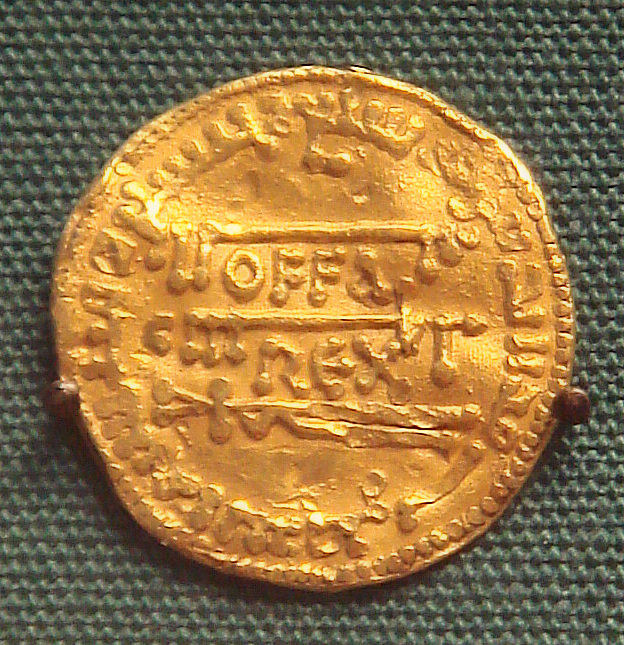
A mancus / gold dinar of king Offa, copied from the dinars of the Abbasid Caliphate (774); it includes the Arabic text Muhammad is the Apostle of Allah, a line from the Shahada.

Although Islam is generally thought of as a contemporary arrival in England, Muslims have been trading and exchanging ideas with the English for centuries.

An early example is the decision of Offa, the 8th-century King of Mercia (one of the Anglo-Saxon kingdoms existing at that time), to have a coin minted with an Islamic inscription – largely a copy of coins issued by a contemporary Muslim ruler, Caliph Al-Mansur. These coins may have been minted simply for prestige or to facilitate trade with the expanding Caliphate of Córdoba, as Islamic gold dinars were the most important coinage in the Mediterranean at the time. Offa's coin looked enough like the original that it would be readily accepted in southern Europe, while at the same time his own name was clearly visible.

References to Britain are also found in early Islamic geographical literature, such as the 9th century work of Ahmad ibn Rustah, which describes the islands of "Bratiniya".

Muslim scholarship, especially early Islamic philosophy and Islamic science, was well known through Latin translation among the learned in England by 1386, when Geoffrey Chaucer was writing. In the Prologue to the Canterbury Tales, there is among the pilgrims wending their way to Canterbury a 'Doctour of Phisyk' whose learning included Rhazes (Al-Razi), Avicenna (Ibn Sina, Arabic ابن سينا) and Averroes (Ibn Rushd, Arabic ابن رشد). In the Pardoner's Tale, Chaucer mentions part of Avicenna's work concerning poisons. Avicenna's The Canon of Medicine (1025), in Latin translation, was a standard text for medical students up until the 18th century. Roger Bacon, one of the earliest European advocates of the scientific method, is known to have studied the works of several early Muslim philosophers. In particular, his work on optics in the 13th century was influenced by the Book of Optics (1021) by Ibn al-Haytham (Alhazen).

Professor John Makdisi's article "The Islamic Origins of the Common Law", published in the North Carolina Law Review, suggests that English common law was inspired by medieval Islamic law. Makdisi drew comparisons between the "royal English contract protected by the action of debt" and the "Islamic Aqd", the "English assize of novel disseisin" (a petty assize adopted in the 1166 at the Assizes of Clarendon) and the "Islamic Istihqaq", and the "English jury" and the "Islamic Lafif" in the classical Maliki school of Islamic jurisprudence, and argued that these institutions were transmitted to England by the Normans, "through the close connection between the Norman kingdoms of Roger II in Sicily — ruling over a conquered Islamic administration — and Henry II in England." Makdisi also argued that the "law schools known as Inns of Court" in England (which he asserts are parallel to Madrasahs) may have also originated from Islamic law. He states that the methodology of legal precedent and reasoning by analogy (Qiyas) are also similar in both the Islamic and common law systems. Other legal scholars such as Monica Gaudiosi, Gamal Moursi Badr and A. Hudson have argued that the English trust and agency institutions, which were introduced by Crusaders, may have been adapted from the Islamic Waqf and Hawala institutions they came across in the Middle East. Paul Brand also notes parallels between the Waqf and the trusts used to establish Merton College by Walter de Merton, who had connections with the Knights Templar, but Brand also points out that the Knights Templar were primarily concerned with fighting the Muslims rather than learning from them, making it less likely that they would imitate Muslim legal institutions.

=== Early modern period ===
The first English convert to Islam mentioned by name is John Nelson. The 16th-century writer Richard Hakluyt claimed he was forced to convert, though he mentions in the same story other Englishmen who had converted willingly.

This king had a son which was a ruler in an island called Gerbi, whereunto arrived an English ship called the Green Dragon, of the which was master one M. Blonket, who, having a very unhappy boy on that ship, and understanding that whosoever would turn Turk should be well entertained of them a yeoman of our Queen's guard, whom the king's son had enforced to turn Turk; his name was John Nelson.

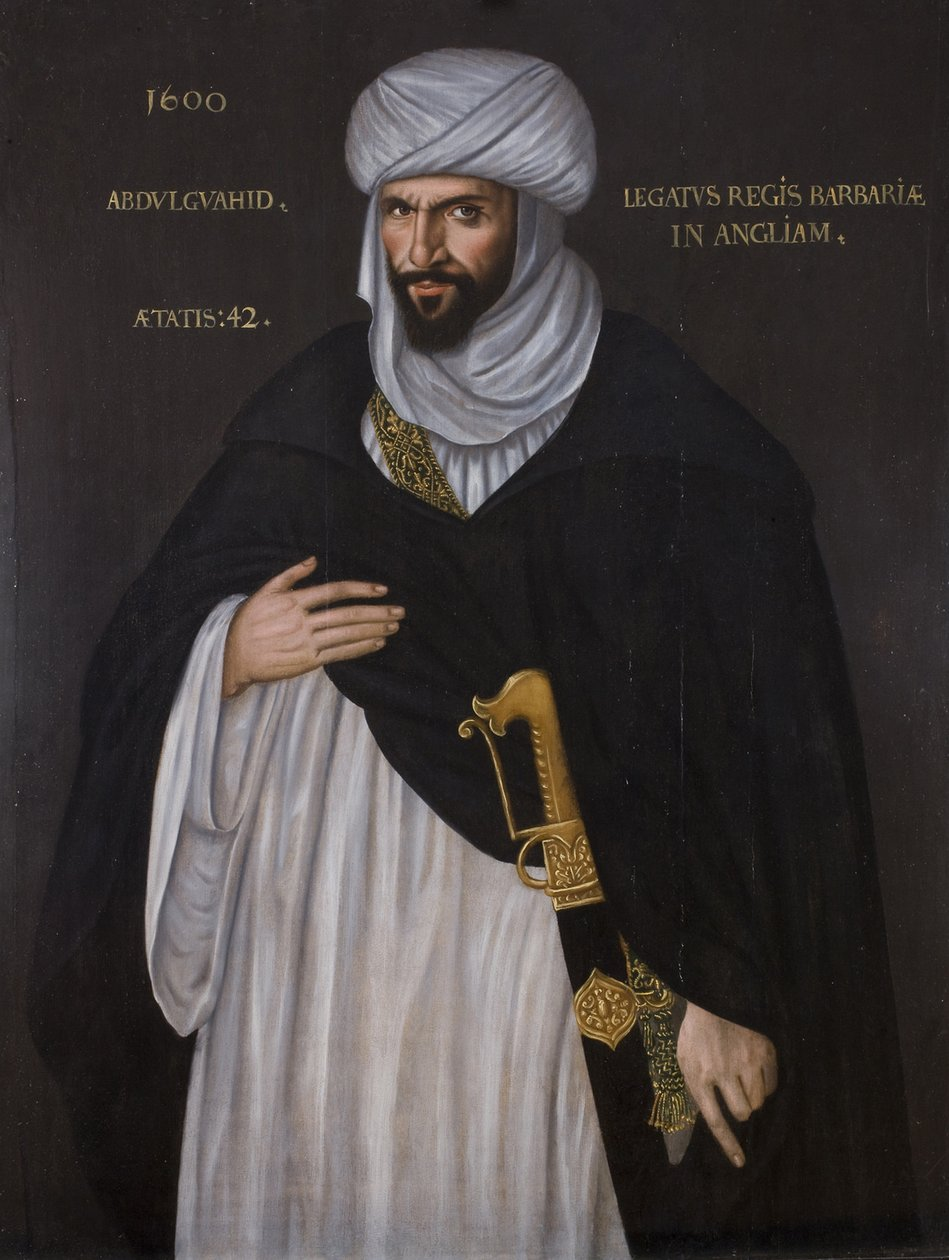
Portrait of Abd el-Ouahed ben Messaoud, a Moorish ambassador to Queen Elizabeth I in 1600

Captain John Ward of Kent was one of a number of English sailors who became pirates based in the Maghreb and also converted to Islam (see also Barbary pirates).

Unitarians became interested in the faith, and Henry Stubbe wrote so favourably about Islam that it is thought he too had converted to the faith.

From 1609 to 1616, England lost 466 ships to Barbary pirates, who sold the passengers into slavery in North Africa. In 1625, it was reported that Lundy, an island in the Bristol Channel which had been a pirate lair for much of the previous half century, had been occupied by three Ottoman pirates who were threatening to burn Ilfracombe; Algerine rovers were using the island as a base in 1635, although the island had itself been attacked and plundered by a Spanish fleet in 1633. In 1627, Barbary pirates under command of the Dutch renegade Jan Janszoon operating from the Moroccan port of Salé occupied Lundy, before they were expelled by Sir John Pennington. During this time there were reports of captured slaves being sent to Algiers and of the Islamic flag flying over Lundy.

The Muslim Moors had a noticeable influence on the works of George Peele and William Shakespeare. Some of their works featured Moorish characters, such as Peele's The Battle of Alcazar and Shakespeare's The Merchant of Venice, Titus Andronicus and Othello, which featured a Moorish Othello as its title character. These works are said to have been inspired by several Moorish delegations from Morocco to Elizabethan England around 1600. A portrait was painted of one of the Moorish ambassadors, Abd el-Ouahed ben Messaoud ben Mohammed Anoun, who had come to promote an Anglo-Moroccan alliance.

Turbans were worn in Renaissance England. While friendly relations were formed between England and the Islamic civilizations of the Middle East in the early 16th century, Persian and Turkish style fashions were sometimes worn by the higher classes as a form of party or fancy dress.

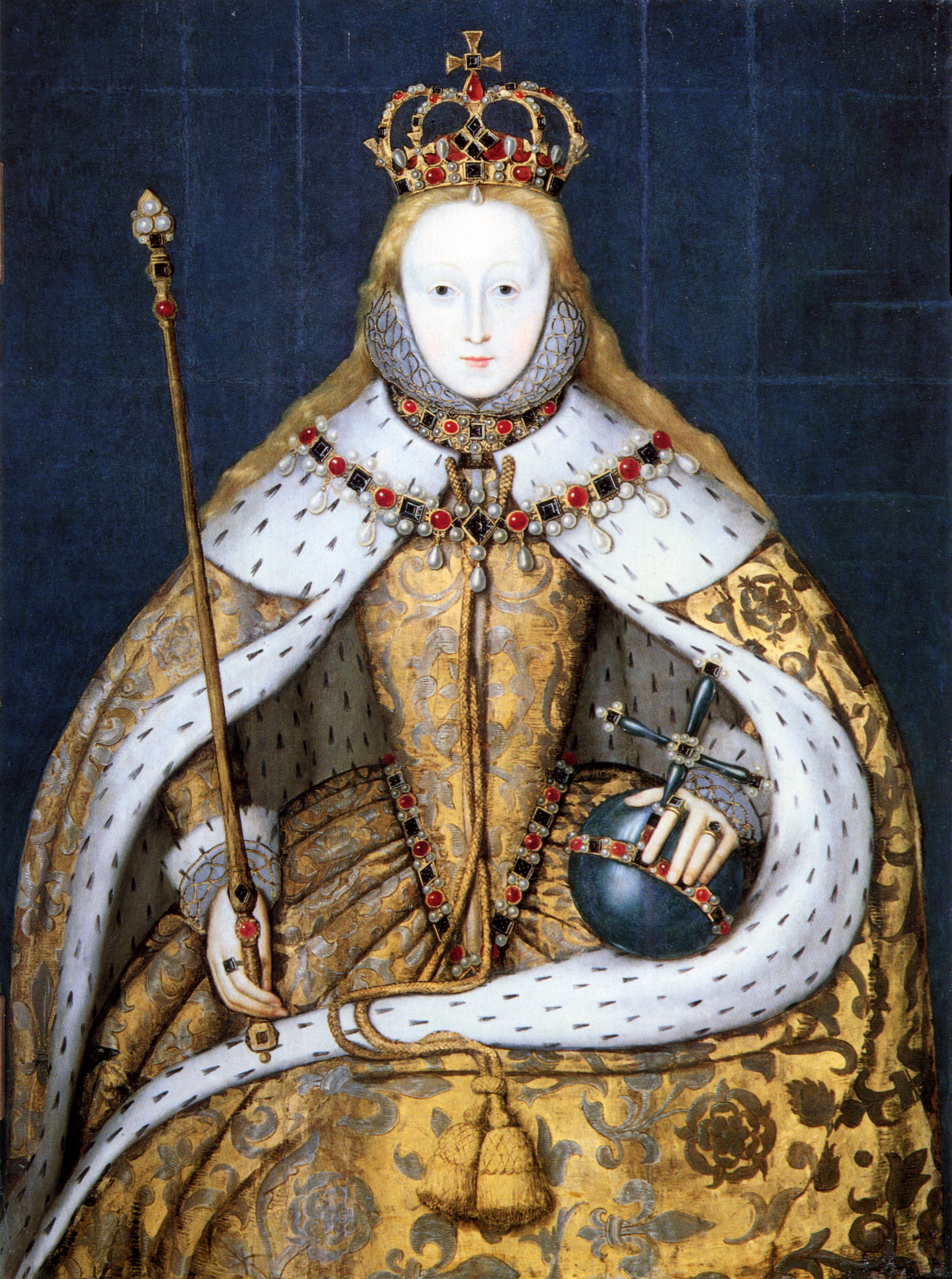
Elizabeth I of England was one of the earliest British monarchs to establish relations, alliances and trade with Muslim majority countries.

Diplomatic relations were also established with the Ottoman Empire with the chartering of the Levant Company and the dispatch of the first English ambassador to the Porte, William Harborne, in 1578. For the first time, a Treaty of Commerce was signed in 1580. Numerous envoys were dispatched in both directions and epistolar exchanges occurred between Elizabeth and Sultan Murad III. In one correspondence, Murad entertained the notion that Islam and Protestantism had "much more in common than either did with Roman Catholicism, as both rejected the worship of idols", and argued for an alliance between England and the Ottoman Empire. To the dismay of Catholic Europe, England exported tin and lead (for cannon-casting) and ammunition to the Ottoman Empire, and Elizabeth seriously discussed joint military operations with Murad III during the outbreak of war with Spain in 1585, as Francis Walsingham was lobbying for a direct Ottoman military involvement against the common Spanish enemy. Although she never did receive any assistance from the Ottomans, her relations with the sultans did not waver.

In 17th-century England, there was a "second wave" of interest in the study of Arabic science and Islamic philosophy. Arabic manuscripts were considered the key to a "treasure house" of ancient knowledge, which led to the founding of Arabic chairs at Oxford and Cambridge Universities, where Arabic was taught. A large collection of Arabic manuscripts were acquired, collected in places such as the Bodleian Library at Oxford. These Arabic manuscripts were sought after by natural philosophers for their research in subjects such as observational astronomy or mathematics, and also encompassed subjects ranging from science, religion, and medicine, to typography and garden plants.

Besides scientific and philosophical literature, works of Arabic fictional literature were also translated into Latin and English during the 17th and 18th centuries. The most famous of these was the One Thousand and One Nights (Arabian Nights), which was first translated into English in 1706 and has since then had a profound influence on English literature. Another famous work was Ibn Tufail's philosophical novel Hayy ibn Yaqdhan, which was translated into Latin as Philosophus Autodidactus by Edward Pococke the Younger in 1671 and then into English by Simon Ockley in 1708. The English translation of Hayy ibn Yaqdhan, set on a desert island, may have inspired Daniel Defoe to write Robinson Crusoe, considered the first novel in English, in 1719. Later translated literary works include Layla and Majnun and Ibn al-Nafis' Theologus Autodidactus.

Bengal (now Bangladesh and West Bengal), a province of Mughal India with a Muslim majority and Hindu minority, was annexed by the East India Company after the Battle of Plassey in 1757. The cheap textiles and other manufactured goods from Bengal directly contributed to the Industrial Revolution in England, with the textiles produced in Bengal being used to support British industries such as textile manufacturing, aided by the invention of devices such as the spinning jenny. With the establishment of Crown control in India after 1857, the British Empire ruled over a large Muslim population.

By the time of Union with Scotland in 1707, only small numbers of Muslims were living in England. The first large group of Muslims to arrive, in the 18th century, were lascars (sailors) recruited from the Indian subcontinent (largely from the Bengal region) to work for the Honourable East India Company, many of whom settled down and took local wives (due to a lack of Indian women living in England at the time). 38 lascars are reported arriving in British ports in 1760. Between 1803 and 1813, there were more than 10,000 lascars from the Indian subcontinent visiting British port cities and towns. By 1842, 3,000 lascars visited the UK annually, and by 1855, 12,000 lascars were arriving annually in British ports. In 1873, 3,271 lascars arrived in Britain. Throughout the early 19th century lascars visited Britain at a rate of 1,000 every year, which increased to a rate of 10,000 to 12,000 every year throughout the late 19th century.

Due to the majority being lascars, the earliest Muslim communities were found in port towns. Naval cooks also came, many of them from the Sylhet Division of what is now Bangladesh. One of the most famous early Muslim immigrants to England was Sake Dean Mahomet, a captain of the East India Company army who in 1810 founded London's first Indian restaurant, the Hindoostane Coffee House. He is also reputed for introducing shampoo and therapeutic massage to the United Kingdom.

=== Modern era ===
By 1911, the British Empire had a Muslim population of 94 million, larger than the empire's 58 million Christian population. By the 1920s, the British Empire included roughly half of the world's Muslim population. More than 400,000 Muslim soldiers of the British Indian Army fought for Britain during World War I, where 62,060 were killed in action, and half a million Muslim soldiers of the British Indian Army fought for Britain against the Nazis in World War II. David Lloyd George, British Prime Minister from 1916 to 1922, stated: "we are the greatest Mahomedan power in the world and one-fourth of the population of the British Empire is Mahomedan. There have been no more loyal adherents to the throne and no more effective and loyal supporters of the Empire in its hour of trial." This statement was later reiterated by Gandhi in 1920.

Muslim mass immigration to Britain began after World War II, as a result of the destruction and labour shortages caused by the war. In 1951 there were around 21,000 Muslims in Britain. Muslim migrants from former British colonies, predominantly India, Pakistan, and Bangladesh, were recruited in large numbers by government and businesses to rebuild the country. Large numbers of doctors recruited from India and Pakistan, encouraged by health minister Enoch Powell in the early 1960s, also played a key role in the establishment of the NHS health service.

British Asians (both Muslim and non-Muslim) faced increased discrimination following the establishment of the National Front in 1967 and Enoch Powell's Rivers of Blood speech. This included overt racism in the form of Paki bashing, predominantly from white power skinheads, the National Front, and the British National Party, throughout the 1970s and 1980s. Drawing inspiration from the civil rights movement, the black power movement, and the anti-apartheid movement, young British Pakistani and British Bangladeshi activists began a number of anti-racist Asian youth movements in the 1970s and 1980s, including the Bradford Youth Movement in 1977, the Bangladeshi Youth Movement following the murder of Altab Ali in 1978, and the Newham Youth Movement following the murder of Akhtar Ali Baig in 1980.

== Demography ==
The settlements with the largest numbers of Muslims are Birmingham, Bradford, London, Manchester and Leicester. There are also high numbers in Kirklees, Luton, Bolton, Slough, Rochdale and mill towns of Northern England like Oldham and Blackburn.

Muslim population in English local authority areas. 0.0%-0.9% 1%-1.9% 2%-4.9% 5%-9.9% 10%-19.9% 20% and more

The local authorities with a Muslim population greater than 10 percent as of 2021 were:

Top 25 Local Authorities (2021 Census)
Local authority	Population	Per cent
London Borough of Tower Hamlets	123,912	39.93%
Blackburn with Darwen	54,146	34.99%
London Borough of Newham	122,146	34.80%
Luton	74,191	32.94%
London Borough of Redbridge	97,068	31.29%
City of Bradford	166,846	30.53%
Birmingham	341,811	29.85%
Slough	46,661	29.44%
Pendle	24,900	26.00%
London Borough of Barking and Dagenham	53,389	24.40%
Metropolitan Borough of Oldham	59,031	24.38%
Leicester	86,443	23.45%
Manchester	122,962	22.28%
London Borough of Waltham Forest	60,157	21.60%
London Borough of Brent	72,574	21.40%
City of Westminster	40,873	20.00%
Bolton	58,997	19.93%
Rochdale	42,121	18.82%
London Borough of Ealing	68,907	18.80%
London Borough of Enfield	61,477	18.60%
Kirklees	80,046	18.48%
London Borough of Hounslow	48,028	16.70%
Preston	23,825	16.12%
London Borough of Camden	33,380	16.10%
Hyndburn	12,049	14.65%

Most large cities have one area that is majority Muslim even if the rest of the city has a fairly small Muslim population; see, for example, Harehills in Leeds. In addition, it is possible to find small areas that are almost entirely Muslim: for example, Savile Town in Dewsbury.

In September 2009, the ONS published information showing that Mohammed (or variations of it) was the third most popular boys' name in England and Wales, and the most popular name in London.

Some 38% of England's Muslims live in London, where 1,012,823 identified as Muslim in 2011, representing 12.4% of London's population of 8,173,941.

== Denominations ==
=== Sunni ===
Sunni Muslims comprise the majority of the English Muslim population, with the majority following the Hanafi school of law, including members of the Barelvi and Deobandi movements. There are also Shafi'i, Maliki, and Hanbali followers. A minority of Sunni Muslims in England, who may or may not follow one of the aforementioned schools of law, are affiliated with the Salafi movement.

=== Shia ===
Shia mosques are usually Twelvers but cater to Zaydis and Ismailis also and they usually include facilities for women. There are 200,000 Shias in Britain from Iran, Iraq, Pakistan, Turkey and elsewhere. Various Shia mosques include the Husseini Islamic Centre in Stanmore, Harrow which acts as one of the main Shia Muslim mosques in Britain. Others include Al Masjid ul Husseini in Northolt, Ealing, Imam Khoei Islamic Centre in Queens Park, Brent and the Islamic Centre of England, Maida Vale.

== Demographics ==
Historical population
Year	Pop.	±%
2001	1,524,887	—
2011	2,660,116	+74.4%
2021	3,801,186	+42.9%
Religious affiliation was not recorded prior to 2001.

=== Geographical distribution ===
English Muslims by Region
Region	2021		2011		2001	
Region	Number	%	Number	%	Number	%
Greater London	1,318,754	15.0%	1,012,823	12.4%	607,083	8.5%
West Midlands	569,963	9.6%	376,152	6.7%	216,184	4.1%
North West	563,105	7.6%	356,458	5.1%	204,261	3.0%
Yorkshire and the Humber	442,533	8.1%	326,050	6.2%	189,089	3.8%
South East	309,067	3.3%	201,651	2.3%	108,725	1.4%
East	234,744	3.3%	148,341	2.5%	78,931	1.5%
East Midlands	210,766	4.3%	140,649	3.1%	70,224	1.7%
South West	80,152	1.4%	51,228	1.0%	23,465	0.5%
North East	72,102	2.7%	46,764	1.8%	26,925	1.1%
England	3,801,186	6.7%	2,660,116	5.0%	1,524,887	3.1%

=== Ethnic group ===
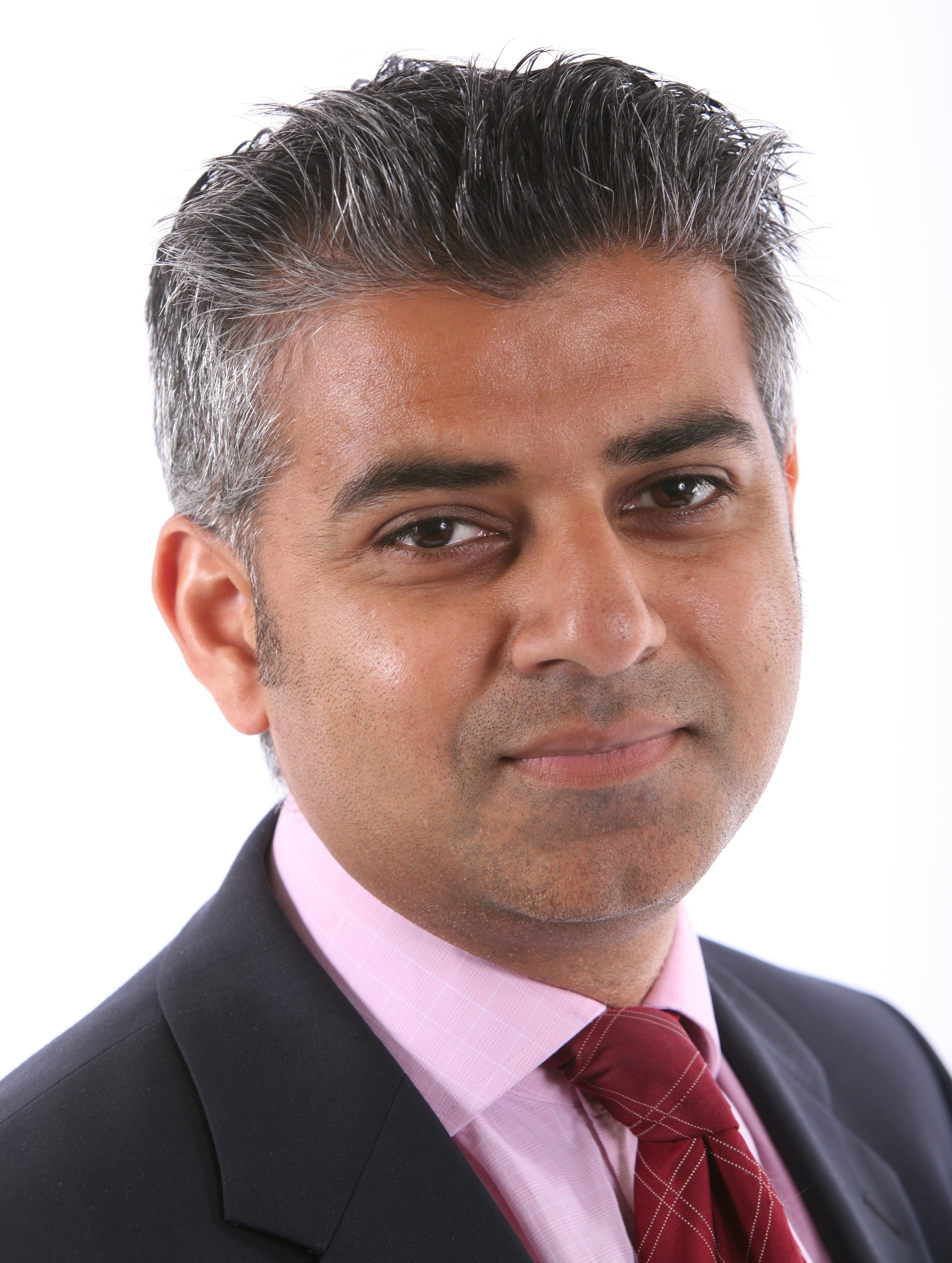
Sadiq Khan, a British Pakistani and the first Muslim elected as Mayor of London.

According to the 2011 census, 2.7 million Muslims live in England and Wales, where they form 5.0% of the population.

English Muslims by Ethnic group
Ethnic group	2001		2011		2021	
Ethnic group	Number	%	Number	%	Number	%
Asian	1,125,420	73.80	1,805,375	67.87	2,515,133	66.17
– Pakistani	650,516	42.66	1,017,463	38.25	1,454,944	38.28
– Bangladeshi	254,704	16.70	392,636	14.76	579,117	15.24
– Indian	131,098	8.60	195,952	7.37	245,681	6.46
– Chinese	735	0.05	7,802	0.29	1,800	0.05
– Other Asian	88,367	5.79	191,522	7.20	233,591	6.15
Black	104,714	6.87	267,294	10.05	408,320	10.74
– African	94,665	6.21	203,774	7.66	370,967	9.76
– Caribbean	4,445	0.29	7,294	0.27	7,105	0.19
– Other Black	5,604	0.37	56,226	2.11	30,248	0.80
White	177,231	11.62	206,982	7.78	220,880	5.81
– British	61,513	4.03	75,008	2.82	87,889	2.31
– Irish	870	0.05	1,872	0.07	1,339	0.04
– Roma					2,012	0.05
– Gypsy and Irish Traveller			361	0.01	444	0.01
– Other White	114,848	7.53	129,661	4.87	129,196	3.40
Mixed	62,496	4.10	100,383	3.77	138,297	3.64
– White and Asian	29,663	1.95	48,636	1.83	54,938	1.45
– White and Black African	10,209	0.67	15,279	0.57	22,365	0.59
– White and Black Caribbean	1,340	0.1	5,279	0.20	5,348	0.14
– Other Mixed	21,284	1.40	31,189	1.17	55,646	1.46
Other			280,082	10.53	518,556	13.64
– Arab			170,300	6.40	267,727	7.04
– Other Ethnic group	55,026	3.61	109,782	4.13	250,829	6.60
TOTAL	1,524,887	100.0	2,660,116	100.0	3,801,186	100.0

=== Pakistanis ===
The single largest group of Muslims in England and Wales are of Pakistani descent. Pakistanis from Mirpur District were one of the first South Asian Muslim communities to permanently settle in the United Kingdom, arriving in Birmingham and Bradford in the late 1930s. Immigration from Mirpur grew from the late 1950s, accompanied by immigration from other parts of Pakistan especially from Punjab which included cities like Sialkot, Jhelum, Gujar Khan and Gujrat and also from the north-west Punjab including the Chhachhi Pathans from Attock District, and some from villages of Ghazi, Nowshera and Peshawar. There is also a fairly large Pakistani community from Kenya and Uganda found in London. People of Pakistani extraction are particularly notable in West Midlands (Birmingham), West Yorkshire (Bradford), London (Waltham Forest, Newham), Lancashire/Greater Manchester, and several industrial towns like Luton, Slough, High Wycombe and Oxford.

=== Bangladeshis ===
People of Bangladeshi descent are one of the largest Muslim communities (after Pakistanis), 16.8% of Muslims in England and Wales are of Bangladeshi descent, the ethnic group in the UK with the largest proportion of people following a single religion, being 92% Muslim. Majority of these Muslim come from the Sylhet region of Bangladesh, mainly concentrated in London (Tower Hamlets, Newham and Redbridge), Luton, Birmingham and Oldham. The Bangladeshi Muslim community in London form 24% of the Muslim population, larger than any other ethnic group.

Initial limited mosque availability meant that prayers were conducted in small rooms of council flats until the 1980s when more and larger facilities became available. Some synagogues and community buildings were turned into mosques and existing mosques began to expand their buildings. This process has continued down to the present day with the East London Mosque recently expanding into a large former car park where the London Muslim Centre is now used for prayers, recreational facilities and housing. Most people regard themselves as part of the ummah, and their identity based on their religion rather than their ethnic group. Cultural aspects of a 'Bengali Islam' are seen as superstition and as un-Islamic. The identity is far stronger in comparison to the native land.

Other groups also attract a few people, the Salafi – who view the teachings of the first generations as the correct one, and appeals to younger Muslims as a way to differentiate themselves towards their elders. Other large groups include another Sunni movement, the Fultoli movement (initiated by Abdul Latif Chowdhury), and the Tablighi Jamaat – which is a missionary and revival movement, and avoids political attention. All these groups work to stimulate Islamic identity among local Bengalis or Muslims and particularly focus on the younger members of the communities.

=== Indians ===
8% of Muslims in England and Wales are of Indian descent, especially those who are from Gujarat, West Bengal, Uttar Pradesh and Bihar. The Gujarati Muslims from Surat and Bharuch districts in India started to arrive from the 1930s, settling in the towns of Dewsbury and Batley in Yorkshire and parts of Lancashire. There are large numbers of Gujarati Muslims in Dewsbury, Blackburn (inc. Darwen), Bolton, Preston, Nuneaton, Gloucester and London (Newham, Waltham Forest and Hackney). Immigration of Muslims into UK, was primarily started off by Indians during the colonial rule.

=== Somalis ===
The United Kingdom, with 43,532 Somalia-born residents in 2001, and an estimated 101,000 in 2008, is home to the largest Somali community in Europe. A 2009 estimate by Somali community organisations puts the Somali population figure at 90,000 residents. Although most Somalis in the UK are recent arrivals, the first Somali immigrants were seamen and traders who arrived and settled in port cities in the late 19th century. Established Somali communities are found in Bristol, Liverpool and London, and newer ones have formed in Leicester, Manchester and Sheffield. It has been estimated that between 7,000 and 9,000 Somalis live in Liverpool.

=== Turks ===
Turks first began to emigrate in large numbers from the island of Cyprus for work and then again when Turkish Cypriots were forced to leave their homes during the Cyprus conflict. Turks then began to come from Turkey for economic reasons. Recently, smaller groups of Turks have begun to immigrate to the United Kingdom from other European countries. As of 2011, there is a total of about 500,000 people of Turkish origin in the UK, made up of approximately 150,000 Turkish nationals and about 300,000 Turkish Cypriots. Furthermore, in recent years, there has been a growing number of ethnic Turks with Bulgarian, German, Greek, Macedonian, and Romanian citizenship who have also migrated to the United Kingdom. The majority live in London.

=== White (European) ===
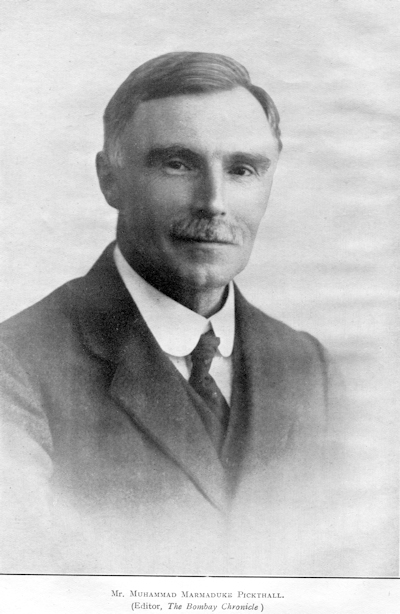
Muhammad Marmaduke Pickthall, author of The Meaning of the Glorious Koran.

The 2001 census stated that there were 179,409 Muslims who described themselves as 'white' in the 2001 census. About one third of white Muslims are of White Slavic and Balkan Muslim origin, and would likely have originated from locations such as Bosnia and Herzegovina, Kosovo, Adyghe, Chechnya, Albania, Macedonia, and Bulgaria. Another one third have origins in Turkey, the Middle East and North Africa. The remainder of white Muslims identified themselves as White British and White Irish, including converts.

=== Nigerian ===
There are also a number of Muslim immigrants in England that arrived from Nigeria. Nigerian Muslims in the UK are represented by several community organizations, including the Nigeria Muslim forum, which is affiliated with the Council of Nigerian Muslim Organisations in UK and Ireland (CNMO) and the Muslim Council of Britain (MCB).

=== Maghrebis ===
Although data is short, findings indicate Maghrebis make up a substantial community in Europe and England. Britain has long ties with Maghrebis, through contact with the Moors. Nevertheless, Britain has a far lower count of Maghrebis in comparison to France, Belgium, the Netherlands and Spain, where the majority of Muslims are Maghrebi.

== Conflicts ==
Social disturbance began in the Muslim community in England in 1988 with the publication of the satirical novel The Satanic Verses in London. Ayatollah Khomeini condemned the book with a fatwa in 1989. The Satanic Verses controversy led to Muslim men first in Bolton and then in Bradford organising book-burnings.

The 7 July 2005 London bombings were a series of coordinated blasts that hit the public transport system during the morning rush hour, killing 52 people and also the four bombers. The latter were British Muslims, three of Pakistani and one of Jamaican heritage. They were apparently motivated by Britain's involvement in the Iraq War and other conflicts. In response, Dr. Afifi al-Akiti, the KFAS Fellow in Islamic Studies at the Oxford Centre for Islamic Studies, and the Islamic Centre Lecturer in Islamic Studies in the Faculty of Theology – University of Oxford, wrote an internationally acclaimed Fatwa against terrorism titled "Defending the Transgressed by Censuring the Reckless against the Killing of Civilians".

In May 2013, British soldier Lee Rigby was publicly killed in Woolwich, London. Two converts to Islam of Nigerian heritage were found guilty of the murder, one of them having claimed to be a soldier of Allah as his unsuccessful legal defence.

In 2017, there were four terrorist attacks: the Westminster attack, the Manchester Arena bombing, the 2017 London Bridge attack and the Parsons Green train bombing.

On 20 June 2020, Khairi Saadallah carried out the 2020 Reading stabbings in Forbury Gardens, Reading, England, killing three men and injuring three others in a knife attack that police and the courts classified as an act of Islamist terrorism.

== Position in society ==
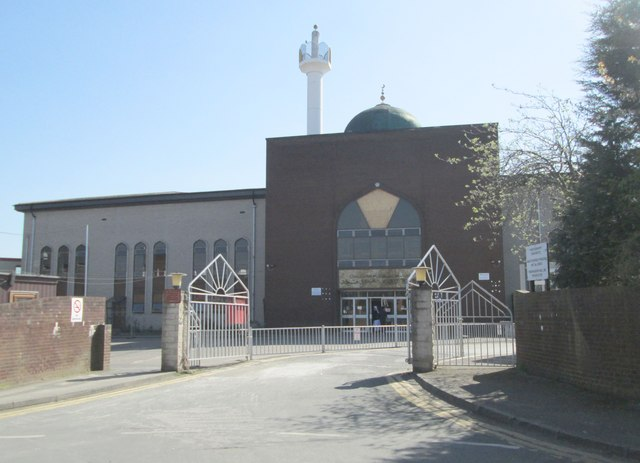
Markazi Masjid in Savile Town. The Savile Town is a Muslim majority town in England with 93% being Asian Muslims.

=== Poverty ===
According to analysis based on the 2001 census, Muslims in England face poor standards of housing, poorer levels of education and are more vulnerable to long-term illness, and that Muslims in the UK had the highest rate of unemployment, the poorest health, the most disability and fewest educational qualifications among religious groups. The figures were, to some extent, explained by the fact that Muslims were the least well-established group, having the youngest age profile.

Conversely, there are estimated to be around 10,000 British Muslim millionaires. There is a growing substantial British Muslim business community, led by multi-billionaires such as Sir Anwar Pervez.

=== Education ===
On a study of more than 13,000 young people, approximately 53% of British Muslims choose to attend university. This is higher than the figure for Christians (45%) and Atheists (32%), but lower than the figure of Hindus and Sikhs, who score 77% and 63% respectively.

Muslim schools regularly outperform those of other faiths. In 2015, Over half of Muslim schools have average of students achieving higher GCSEs (71%) than the national figure (64%).

=== Discrimination ===
There have been cases of threats, one alleged fatal attack, and non-fatal attacks on Muslims and on Muslim targets, including attacks on Muslim graves and mosques. In January 2010, a report from the University of Exeter's European Muslim Research Centre noted that the number of anti-Muslim hate crimes has increased, ranging from "death threats and murder to persistent low-level assaults, such as spitting and name-calling," for which the media and politicians have been blamed with fueling anti-Muslim hatred.

The British media has been criticised for propagating negative stereotypes of Muslims and fueling Islamophobic prejudice. In 2006, several British cabinet ministers were criticised for helping to "unleash a public anti-Muslim backlash" by blaming the Muslim community over issues of integration despite a study commissioned by the Home Office on white and Asian-Muslim youths demonstrating otherwise: that Asian-Muslim youths "are in fact the most tolerant of all" and that white youths "have far more intolerant attitudes," concluding that the attitudes held by members of the white community was a greater "barrier to integration." Another survey by Gallup in 2009 also found that the Muslim community claimed to feel more patriotic about Britain than the general British population as a whole, while another survey found that Muslims assert that they support the role of Christianity in British life more so than British Christians themselves. In January 2010, the British Social Attitudes Survey found that the general public "is far more likely to hold negative views of Muslims than of any other religious group," with "just one in four" feeling "positively about Islam," and a "majority of the country would be concerned if a mosque was built in their area, while only 15 per cent expressed similar qualms about the opening of a church." The "scapegoating" of British Muslims by the media and politicians in the 21st century has been compared in the media to the rise of antisemitism in the early 20th century.

=== Views on Islam in London ===
A poll by the London Evening Standard in December 2007, which surveyed a range of the capital's communities, including Muslims, found that 49% of those surveyed considered Islam as generally intolerant, while 44% saw it as generally tolerant. A total of 51% felt that Muslims were isolated from other communities to a degree, with 12% believing that the majority of them were. A large majority (81% to 7%) believed that the most holy day in Islam, Eid, should not be officially celebrated by the British government, and 88% opposed Muslim teachers covering their faces at work (see British debate over veils). A majority (55%) wanted immigration of Muslims to be cut, with 33% wanting it cut greatly. Islam was seen as the cause of the 7 July attacks on the city in 2005 by 52% of the population, with 35% seeing it as a major factor. Views from the survey which were not in line with the largely negative views included that 71% would vote for a Muslim Mayor of London if they were the best candidate (with 16% against such a vote).

== Notable mosques ==
=== In London ===
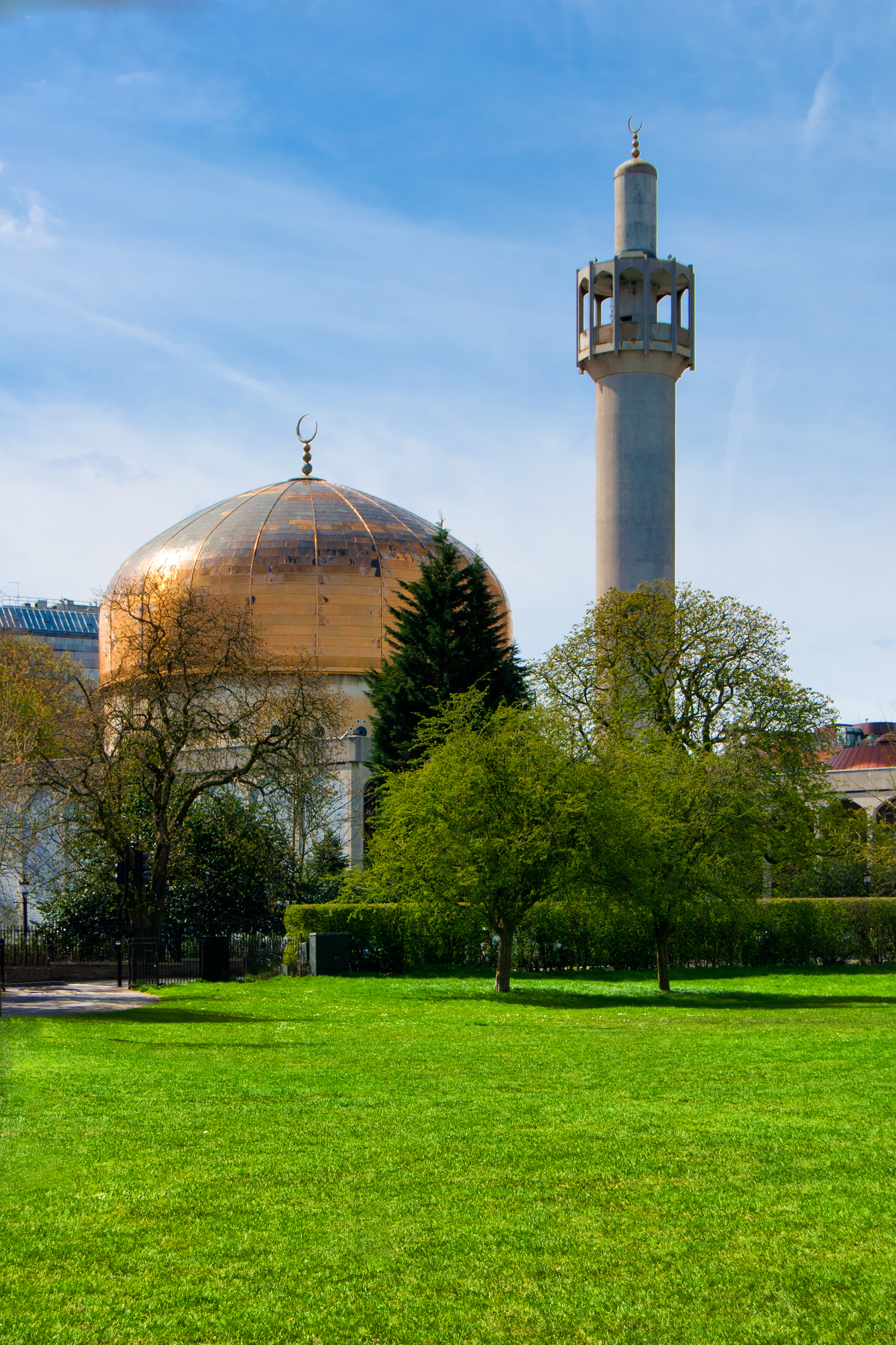
The London Central Mosque, built in 1977.

- East London Mosque
- Finsbury Park Mosque, de-radicalised
- Abbey Mills Mosque
- London Central Mosque, aka the Islamic Cultural Centre in Regent's Park

=== Elsewhere ===
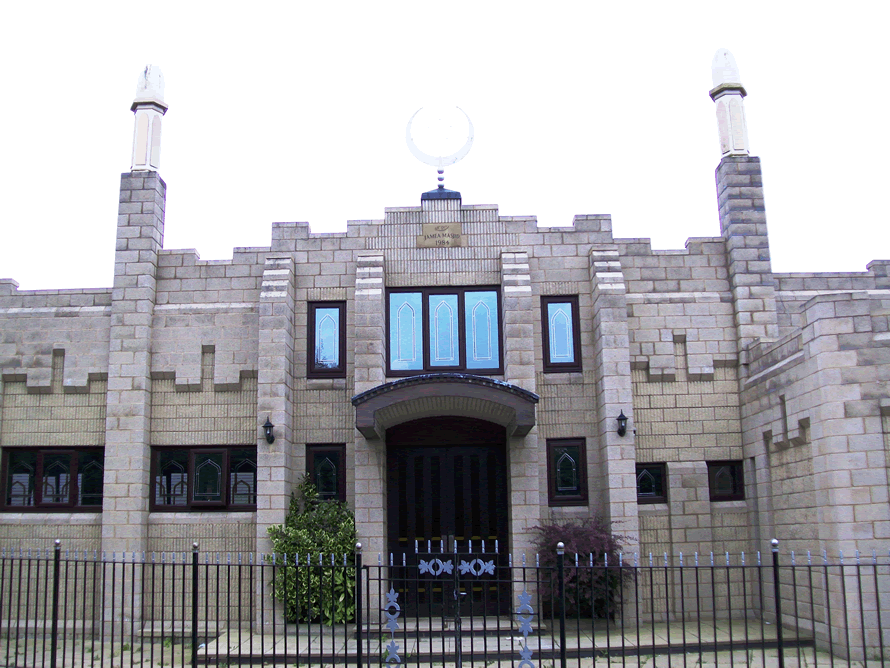
Jamea Masjid in Preston, known for its architectural design.

- Jamea Masjid in Preston
- Shah Jahan Mosque in Woking was the first purpose-built mosque in Britain
- Markazi Mosque in Dewsbury
- Manchester Central Mosque
- Al-Rahma Mosque in Liverpool
- Birmingham Central Mosque
- Leeds Grand Mosque
- Medina Mosque in Sheffield

== See also ==
- List of British Muslims
- Islamic Party of Britain
- Islam in Northern Ireland
- Islam in Scotland
- Islam in Wales
- Islam in the United Kingdom
- Islam by country
- Islam in Europe
- Religion in England
- The Muslim Weekly
- Islam in London
- English Defence League
