= 1989 Dewsbury riot =

British Nationalist vs British Asian Muslim race riot

The Dewsbury riot of 1989 was a minor clash between activists of the British National Party (BNP) and local Muslim youths of Pakistani and Indian origin. The police used riot gear in controlling the events.

== Background ==
Dewsbury is a mill town in Yorkshire, England. After World War II, it attracted large numbers of immigrants from Pakistan and the Gujarat area of West India. In 1982, the Markazi mosque was built in the Savile Town area to serve the town's Islamic community. The number of Muslims in Dewsbury, especially Savile Town and Ravensthorpe, grew steadily as it gained a reputation as an Islam-friendly community in Britain.

== Riot ==
Over a period of months in early 1989, an increasing number of white parents in the Savile Town area withdrew their children from the local school, which had become 80% Asian. In June, the BNP organised a rally to support these parents, whose behaviour was both controversial in the media and illegal under English and Welsh law. Tim Hepple, a BNP member with a history of violence, who was later revealed as an undercover agent, is said to have organised the rally.

The rally, in the centre of Dewsbury, was met with a small group of counterdemonstrators from Kirklees Black Workers' Association, but later, a group of around 800 Muslims gathered after rumours that the BNP were planning to burn the Qur'an in public. Heavy-handed policing forced the group of Muslims back to Savile Town, which led to fighting and the burning of the Scarborough pub in the area. Many Asian market holders in the centre of Dewsbury reported that they were abused by BNP activists since the police were diverted to Savile Town.

Fifty-eight people were arrested, most of whom were Muslim. Prison sentences ranged from three months to three years. Two police officers were injured.

== Legacy ==
The segregation of schools in Dewsbury and the claims by some white parents that they had a "right" to withdraw their children from school have been studied very widely by educationalists. In 1990, there were some similar cases of white parents' withdrawing their children from schools in nearby Wakefield, which has a much smaller Asian community; these cases are often covered by the same studies as the Dewsbury withdrawals.

A report by the Equality and Human Rights Commission in October 2017 mentioned how Dewsbury had become a town divided by religion. Quoting figures from the 2011 Census, the report estimated Dewsbury as a whole as 44% Muslim and Savile Town in particular as 93% Muslim.

There have been two further minor riots in Dewsbury: one between Kurds and Pakistanis in 2007, and one between Hungarians and Pakistanis in February 2008.

== See also ==
- Sectarian violence
