= Islam in Northern Ireland =

Historical Population of Muslims
Year	Pop.	±% p.a.
2001	1,943	—
2011	3,832	+7.03%
2021	10,870	+10.99%
Census data on the number of Muslims in Northern Ireland began in 2001.

Islam in Northern Ireland details Islam in Northern Ireland since its creation as a separate jurisdiction within the United Kingdom on 3 May 1921, under the Government of Ireland Act 1920.

Though a small number of Muslims already lived in what became Northern Ireland in 1921, the bulk of Muslims in Northern Ireland today come from families who immigrated since the late 20th century. At the time of the 2001 Census there were 1,943 living in Northern Ireland, though the 2021 census recorded 10,870 Muslims in Northern Ireland. The Muslims in Northern Ireland come from over 40 countries of origin, from Western Europe all the way through to the Far East.

The Belfast Islamic Centre was established in 1978 by a group of Muslims from the local community. The centre is located near Queens University in south Belfast. Today, the centre acts not only as a place of worship, but as a community centre, social-cultural centre, resource centre, advice centre and a day centre.

According to The Economist (2023), "Many of the 4,000 or so Muslims...are doctors, academics, entrepreneurs and property developers. Only in the past few years have they been joined by a poorer group of asylum-seekers from Somalia. They tend to inhabit leafy, cosmopolitan districts in south Belfast, near Queen’s University where many have taught or studied."

Muslims in Northern Ireland
Year	Percent	Increase
2001	0.11%	-
2011	0.21%	+0.10%
2021	0.57%	+0.36%

== Islamic Centres and Mosques in Northern Ireland ==
As of December 2019, there are a total of ten Islamic centres or prayer places in Northern Ireland. Almost half of these are located in or near Belfast. These Islamic centres are: Belfast Islamic Centre (BIC), Belfast; Northern Ireland Muslim Family Association (NIMFA), Belfast; Dunmurry Masjid, Belfast; Newtownards Mosque, Newtownards; Muslim Association of Coleraine, Coleraine; North West Islamic Association, Derry; Muslim Association of Craigavon, Craigavon; Aman Association, County Fermanagh; Muslim Association of Newry, Newry; and Dungannon Muslim community centre, Dungannon.

These centres organise social and religious events for the Muslim communities in their respective areas.

== Islamophobia ==
On 9 July 2026, During an Ulster Protestant loyalist bonfire for the Eleventh Night in Moygashel, a Mosque replica was burned. Signs saying "secure our borders" and "end the threat of radical Islam" were also placed on the pyre.

== See also ==
- Islam
- Islam in England
- Islam in Ireland
- Islam in Scotland
- Islam in Wales
- Muslim Council of Britain
- Islam in the United Kingdom
- Islam in the Republic of Ireland
- Religion in Northern Ireland
- The Muslim Weekly
- British Muslims
- Islam in London
