= Manchester Central Mosque =

Mosque in Manchester, England, United Kingdom

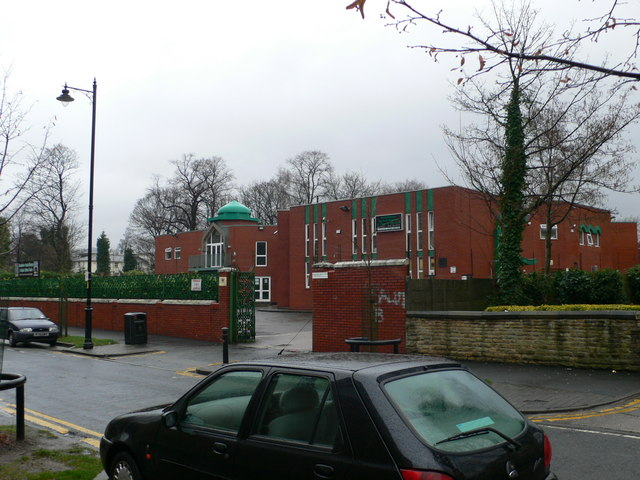

Religion
- Affiliation: Barelvi Sunni Islam

Location
- Location: Manchester, England, United Kingdom
- Interactive map of Manchester Central Mosque
- Coordinates: 53°27′20″N 2°13′10″W

Architecture
- Type: Mosque

Website
- manchestercentralmosque.org

Manchester Central Mosque and Islamic Cultural Centre (also known as “Victoria Park Mosque”) is a mosque in Manchester, England. Sometimes referred to as Jamia Mosque, it is situated in the middle of Victoria Park, Manchester close to the Curry Mile. It plays a key role in Manchester's Muslim community. Imam and Khateeb Hafiz Mueen ud Din Akhtar and Qari Hafiz Javed Akhtar are leaders of the mosque, but left in 2018. Qari Javed also leads taraweeh prayers in Ramadan.

The Victoria Park Mosque began as two adjacent houses, one owned by the Syrian Textile Merchants operating in Manchester since the early 1900s, and the other owned by the mainly Asian community living in the nearby areas of Rusholme and Longsight.

In 1971, the Jamiat-ul-Muslimeen, Manchester, commenced work on a purpose-built mosque in Victoria Park and the two houses were demolished and the "new look" Mosque took its current form. Several expansions and modifications have taken place over the years.

This mosque acts according to the teachings of the Barelwi sect of the Indian subcontinent. Subcontinent.

== See also ==
- Islam in England
- Barelvi movement
- British Muslim Forum
