= Hafiz Patel =

British Asian imam

Hafiz Mohammed Patel Sahib
- حافظ محمد پٹیل

Personal life
- Born: 1926 Bombay Presidency, British Raj (now Gujarat, India)
- Died: 18 February 2016 (aged 89–90) England
- Notable work: Markazi Masjid, Dewsbury

Religious life
- Religion: Islam
- Denomination: Sunni
- Jurisprudence: Hanafi
- Movement: Deobandi

Muslim leader
- Based in: Dewsbury
- Influenced by: Muhammad Yusuf Kandhlawi

Hafiz Mohammed Patel (1926 – 18 February 2016) was a British Asian imam known for his role in establishing the Tablighi Jamaat movement in the United Kingdom and for founding the Dewsbury Markaz mosque, the headquarters of Tablighi Jamaat in Europe.

== Biography ==
Patel was born in Gujarat in 1926 and moved to Karachi following the partition of India in 1947. In his youth, he undertook the Hajj to Mecca, where he met Muhammad Yusuf Kandhlawi, the leader of Tablighi Jamaat, a Deobandi missionary organisation. Kandhlawi was reportedly so impressed with Patel's faith that he prayed in front of the Kaaba to ask Allah to make Patel "the instrument for winning the whole of Britain to Islam".

Patel subsequently emigrated to England, working in factories in the North and Midlands, until the Gujarati Muslim community in the West Yorkshire town of Dewsbury invited Patel to serve as their imam. He founded the Markazi Masjid in Dewsbury, one of the largest mosques in Europe and the European headquarters of Tablighi Jamaat, as well as its adjacent school, one of the two main Islamic seminaries in Britain. At the same time he worked to establish Tablighi Jamaat nationally and maintain its links between the British and international movement, travelling frequently and leaving a legacy of a "nationwide institutional infrastructure that allowed the faith to root itself decisively in British soil".

Patel died on 18 February 2016. His funeral was attended by up to 20,000 people.

== See also ==
- List of Deobandis
