= Jamea Masjid, Preston =

Mosque in Lancashire, England, United Kingdom

Jamea Masjid
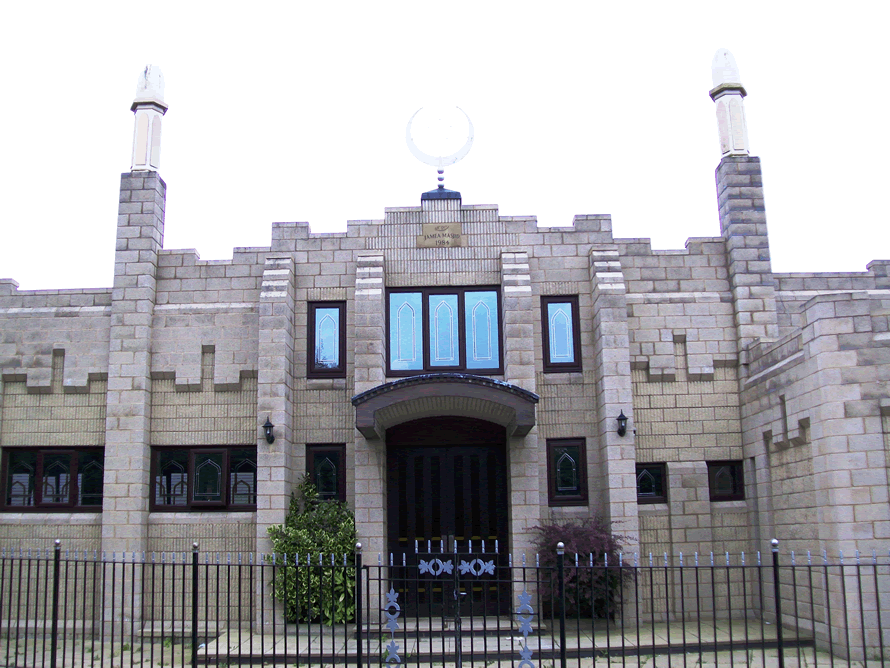

- Location in Preston

Religion
- Affiliation: Islam
- Status: Active

Location
- Location: Preston, Lancashire, England
- Coordinates: 53.755167°N 2.692041°W

Architecture
- Type: Mosque
- Style: Islamic Architecture
- Completed: 1984

Specifications
- Capacity: 900
- Minaret: 4

Website
- Jamea Masjid Website

Jamea Masjid is the largest and longest established mosque (masjid) in Preston, Lancashire, England, UK.

== History ==
The mosque was established in 1964 at 24 Great Avenham Street and thereafter 18 Clarendon Street was acquired in 1967 serving the Muslim community of Preston until the current Jamea Masjid which was completed in 1984. It is recognised as the Central Masjid of Preston due to its capacity, location and the diversity of its worshippers.

Preston Muslim Society, which serves the needs of the Muslim community, was formed in 1962.

== Facilities ==
The main prayer hall can accommodate approximately 900 worshippers and has two side-rooms which have a variety of uses but can be incorporated to extend the capacity of the main prayer hall, as and when required. A multi-use community centre adjacent to the mosque, serves as a youth club with an array of classes and also a function hall.

Jamea Educational Academy is currently in the process of replacing the original building used as the mosque in 1967. The new modern building would continue to cater for the educational needs of the community.

== Architecture ==
The mosque is known for its unique mixed Middle-Eastern and European Gothic 'castle-like' architectural design.

== See also ==
- Islam in the United Kingdom
- Islamic schools and branches
- List of mosques in the United Kingdom
