= John Nelson (convert) =

Earliest known Englishman to convert to Islam

John Nelson was one of the earliest known Englishmen to convert to Islam.

== History ==
John Nelson was the son of one of Elizabeth I's guards. He was a yeoman.

Records from the time show a number of other Englishmen converting to Islam around this time, often as prisoners or when travelling to foreign lands. The same year that Nelson was first mentioned in writing, 1583, was the same year that Oxford English Dictionary first included the word "renegado", a Spanish term for someone who converted from Christianity to Islam. Thus, while Nelson is the first known Islamic convert, he was not the only one in his era.

== See also ==
- List of converts to Islam
