= Bradford Grand Mosque =

Islamic mosque in Bradford, Yorkshire, England

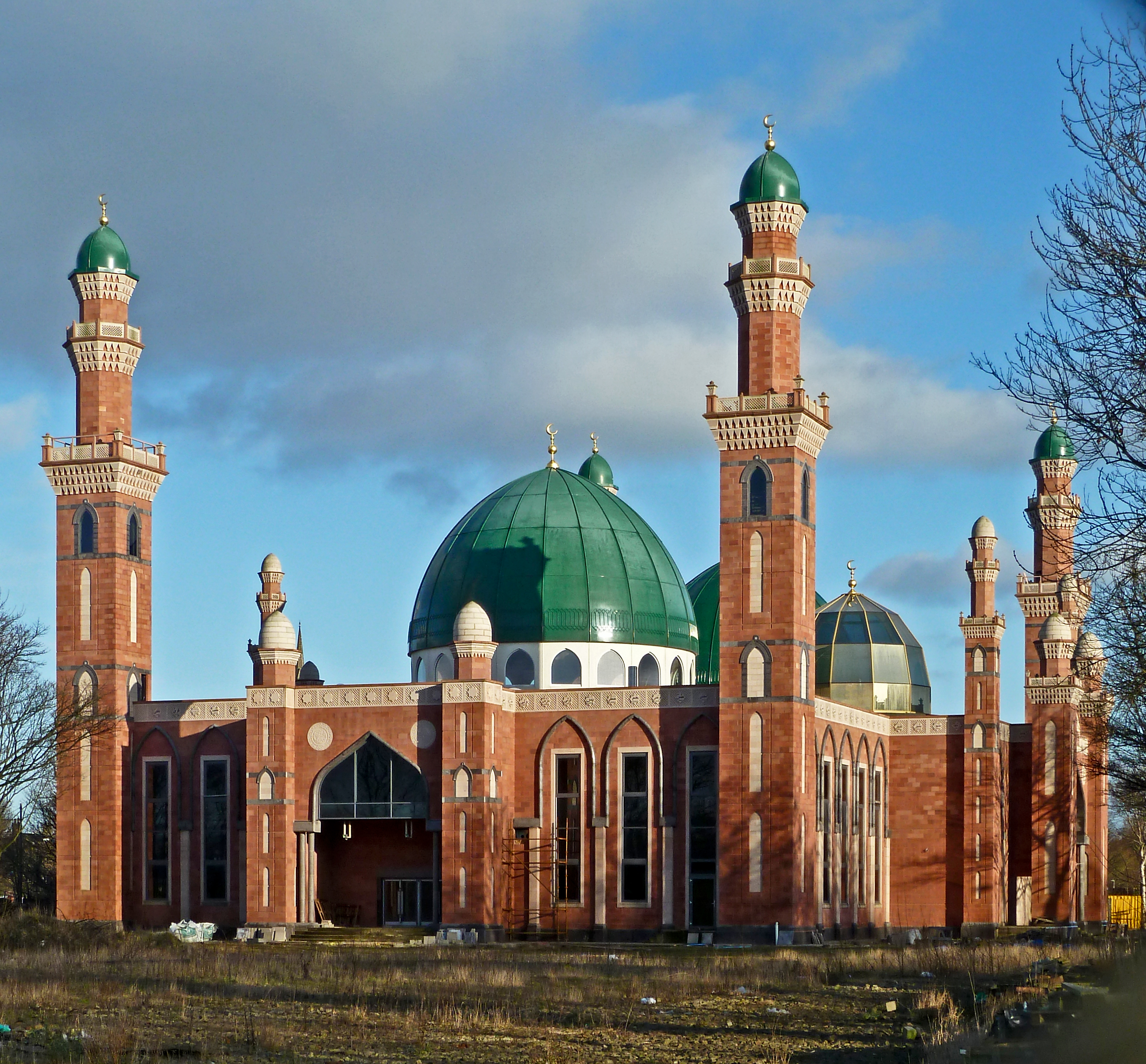

Religion
- Affiliation: Islam
- Branch/tradition: Sufism

Location
- Location: Bradford, West Yorkshire, England, United Kingdom
- Interactive map of Bradford Grand Mosque

Architecture
- Type: Mosque
- Groundbreaking: 2002
- Capacity: 8000

Website
- bradfordgrandmosque.co.uk

The Bradford Grand Mosque, or Al-Jamia Suffa-Tul-Islam Grand Mosque, is the largest Sufi mosque by capacity in the United Kingdom. It is located in Bradford, West Yorkshire, England.

It was founded in 1983, building began in 2002 and it opened in 2012 or 2014. It can house 8,000 worshippers and is one of the largest mosques in the United Kingdom. The mosque was built on a filled-in railway cutting which was part of the "Alpine" railway which ran through the Little Horton area of Bradford. At a cost of more than £4 million, the construction of the mosque was paid for through local donations. In 2019, construction of additional buildings began.

The Telegraph & Argus called it "one of the most architecturally impressive religious buildings in the city."

In November 2018 the mosque arranged a march for peace in memory of the Islamic prophet Muhammad. In March 2020, during the COVID-19 pandemic, a funeral with around 600 people held at the mosque was connected to an outbreak of COVID-19.
