= The Muslim Weekly =

British Muslim Newspaper

The Muslim Weekly is a Muslim newspaper published in London, England, U.K. It was the first weekly newspaper for Muslims in the United Kingdom.

== Description ==
The Muslim Weekly was launched in 2003. Published by SNS Media Ltd, it was created by Ahmed Abdul Malik and Mohammed Shahed Alam. Based in London, it is published every Friday and provides U.K. Muslims with domestic and international news, religious, social and sports reports, alongside commentary, editorials and a letters page for readers.

The Muslim Weekly has an average circulation of 40,000.

== Libel case ==
In 2009 The Muslim Weekly lost a libel case against Imam Dr Taj Hargey after accusing him of not being a Muslim. The court case was brought against the publisher and editor-in-chief, Ahmed Malik, after a news article was published in 2006.
