= Savile Town =

Suburb of Dewsbury, West Yorkshire, England

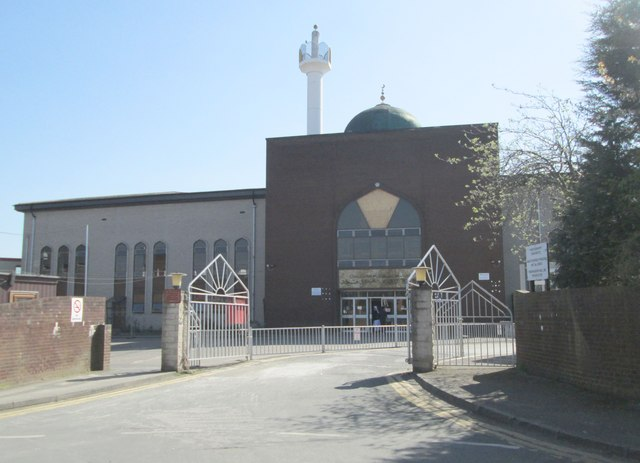
Markazi mosque in Savile Town

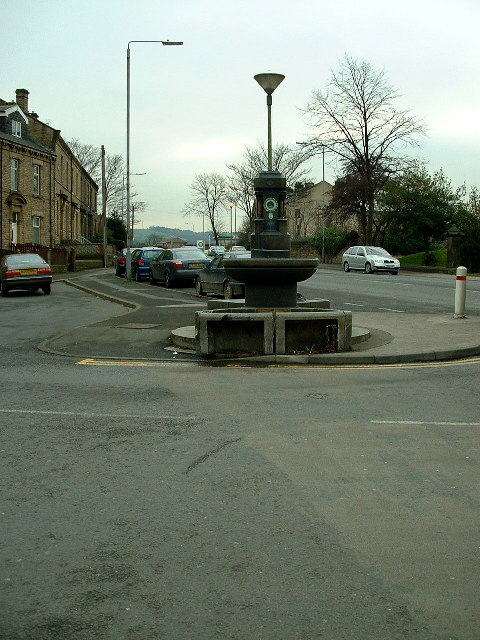
Drinking fountain

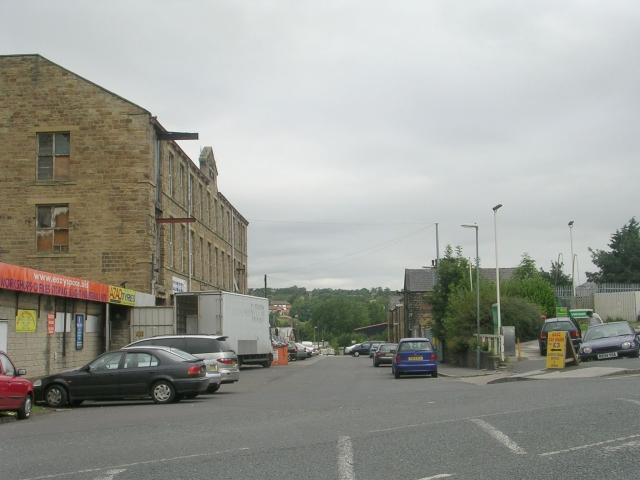
Cardwell Terrace with business premises

Savile Town is a suburb of Dewsbury, Kirklees, West Yorkshire, England, lying just to the south of the River Calder.

It consists of late Victorian housing, which varies between long terraces, semi-detached and detached housing. The mills on the banks of the Calder supplied employment to Savile Town for several decades; these were mostly woollen, and some cotton. As the mills closed, the area became run-down.

== History ==
The area is named for Thomas Savile, who once owned the townships of Dewsbury and Thornhill. He also gave his name to the bridge that leads to the town centre and founded Wakefield Cathedral and Queen Elizabeth Grammar School. There are several roads in Dewsbury, Ossett and Wakefield that have "Savile" in their names. There were once two collieries named "Savile"; one on Owl Lane at the Dewsbury-Ossett border, and one near Methley. Prior to 1910, Savile Town was part of the Thornhill Urban District. In 1910, the district was abolished, and the area became part of the town of Dewsbury.

== Demographics ==
Savile Town is perhaps most famous for its role in the British Muslim community, with the 2021 census recording an 89.6% Muslim population. As reported in 2016, fewer than one per cent of the suburb's residents were White British with the subsequent white flight resulting in Savile Town having the smallest indigenous percentage in the United Kingdom.

The area is home to the Markazi mosque, one of the largest mosques in Europe, which follows the Tablighi Jamaat school of thought.

In a report published in 2017, the 'Kumon Y'all' Equality and Human Rights Commission quoted one person as saying "[White] people were afraid to come to Savile Town [because of the threat of racial abuse and violence]". Author and political advisor Ed Husain described the area as becoming a "quiet caliphate" separate from wider society.

Savile Town's demographics have been largely influenced by its industrial past, which required an influx of workers from India and Pakistan, who ended up migrating to the area due to demand from British factory owners.

== Education ==
Savile Town has one primary school and one religious secondary school.

In 2021, Ofsted failed the Markazi Masjid secondary school after a book named Islam on Homosexuality, which called for the execution of homosexuals, was found in the school library. The school's leaders defended the book as being held for 'research' purposes, although the headteacher "was clear that it should not have been in the library." Ofsted said that the book 'breached the Equality Act 2010 and undermined fundamental British values'. Their report showed that they had been asked to investigate the school after two complaints had been made. The February 2020 inspection rated it Inadequate, the worst rating which could be given. The 2021 report highlighted a number of other areas of concern, including a "weak culture of safeguarding".

== Notable residents ==
Mohammad Sidique Khan, the leader of the 2005 London bombings, lived in Savile Town.

Britain's youngest convicted Islamist extremist, Hamaad Munshi and Britain's youngest suicide bomber, Talha Asmal, were also from Savile Town. Hamaad Munshi's brother, Hassan Munshi was also from Savile Town and was believed to have fled the UK to join the Islamic State terrorist organisation in 2015. The Munshi brothers had lived next door to Asmal.

Baroness Sayeeda Warsi, a British lawyer, politician and member of the House of Lords grew up in Savile Town in the 1970s and 1980s.

== Football club ==
Savile Town is also home to a Sunday league football club called Savile Town FC. It was most recently awarded FA Charted Development Club Of The Year. Its home ground is Savile Town Park on Park Road.
