= Markazi Masjid, Dewsbury =

Mosque in Dewsbury, West Yorkshire, England

Markazi Masjid
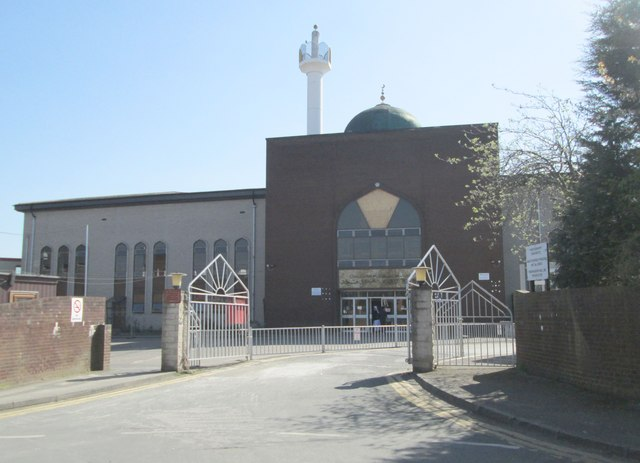

- Location within West Yorkshire

Religion
- Affiliation: Sunni Islam
- Sect: Tablighi Jamaat

Location
- Location: Dewsbury, West Yorkshire
- Interactive map of Markazi Masjid
- Coordinates: 53°40′52″N 1°37′44″W

Architecture
- Founder: Hafiz Patel
- Groundbreaking: 1978
- Completed: 1982
- Capacity: 4,000

The Markazi Masjid ("Central Mosque"), also known as the Dewsbury Markaz or Dar ul Ulum ("House of Knowledge"), is a mosque in the Savile Town area of Dewsbury, West Yorkshire, England.

With a maximum capacity of 4,000, it is one of the largest mosques in Europe. It is the European headquarters of the Tablighi Jamaat movement, and also houses one of the two main Islamic seminaries in the UK. The mosque serves as a centre for Tablighi Jamaat's missionary activity throughout Europe.

It was also the location of the Institute of Islamic Education (Arabic: جامعة تعليم الإسلام, romanized: ‘Jāmi’at Ta’līm al-Islām), a private day and boarding faith school for boys aged 13–25 However the school formally closed in January 2023.

Construction of the mosque commenced in 1978 and was completed in 1982; the seminary was founded in 1980. The founder of Dewsbury Markaz was Hafiz Patel, who remained its leading figurehead until his death in 2016.

== Services ==
The Dewsbury Markaz is aligned with the Tablighi Jamaat movement and bases its services around its six principles. Daily services consist of prayers, talks and public lectures, and the organisation of ten person groups (jamaats) who undertake proselytising trips. As the headquarters of Tablighi Jamaat in Europe, it has frequently been the location of its annual regional gathering (ijtema). The Markaz co-ordinates activities of the Tablighi Jama'at across the UK through liaison with five regional centres in Blackburn, Birmingham, Glasgow, Leicester and London and hundreds of UK mosques.

== Controversy ==
Tablighi Jamaat and the Dewsbury Markaz has been accused of promoting extremist Islamism and having links with Islamic terrorism in Britain; Mohammad Sidique Khan and Shehzad Tanweer, two of the 7 July 2005 London bombers, are reported to have attended prayers at the mosque. Both the allegation of extremism and specific claims that Sidique Khan or Tanweer visited the mosque are denied by its leaders.

In 2006 the Institute of Islamic Education was criticised by Ofsted for an "over-emphasis" on religious study to the neglect of the secular curriculum, leading to poor exam performance. The inspection in 2008 reported that school was satisfactory in that area. The Times journalist Andrew Norfolk has argued the school contributes to ethnic segregation in the local area. In 2021 the school failed a further Ofsted inspection after a book, named 'Islam on Homosexuality' was found in the school library. In the book there are passages which call for execution of homosexuals.

== See also ==
- Islamic schools and branches
- Islam in the United Kingdom
- List of mosques in the United Kingdom
