= Islamism in the United Kingdom =

Islamism, also known as political Islam, is the use of Islam as a source of political identity and action, and has existed in the United Kingdom since the 1970s. It has become widely visible and a topic of political discourse since the beginning of the 21st century.

== Background ==
Islam is the second-largest religion in the United Kingdom, with results from the 2021-2022 Censuses recording just under four million Muslims, or 6.0% of the total population in the United Kingdom. London has the largest population and greatest proportion (15%) of Muslims in the country. The vast majority of British Muslims in the United Kingdom adhere to Sunni Islam, while smaller numbers are associated with Shia Islam.

During the Middle Ages, there was limited cultural exchange between Christendom and the Islamic world. There was no established Muslim presence in the British Isles, though a small number of Crusaders are recorded as having converted in the East, including Robert of St Albans. During the Elizabethan era, contacts became more explicit as the Tudors pursued diplomatic and commercial relations with Muslim powers, including the Ottoman Empire, in part to counter Catholic Habsburg Spain.

As the British Empire expanded, Britain came to rule territories with large Muslim populations; some Muslim seamen (lascars) are known to have settled in Britain from the mid-18th century onwards. In the 19th century, Victorian Orientalism contributed to growing interest in Islam and a number of Britons, including members of the aristocracy, converted. Marmaduke Pickthall, an English writer and convert to Islam, produced the first complete English-language translation of the Qur'an by a British Muslim in 1930. Under the British Indian Army, large numbers of Muslims fought for the United Kingdom during the First and Second World Wars, with some receiving the Victoria Cross. In the decades after the Second World War—particularly following the partition of India in 1947-many Muslims from what is now India, Pakistan and Bangladesh settled permanently in Britain.

Today, British Muslims are ethnically diverse. South Asians form the largest share of Muslims in Britain, alongside significant Turkish, Arab, and Somali communities, as well as an estimated 100,000 British converts from a range of backgrounds. Muslims have the youngest average age profile among the major religious groups in the United Kingdom. The Muslim population has grown significantly in recent decades, at a rate several times faster than the population overall. Recent broad estimates suggest around 5,000–6,000 people convert to Islam each year, with women forming the majority in survey-based studies. (Full article...)

== Early history ==
Radical Islam has been present in Great Britain since the 1970s, but had not received wider public attention prior to the 7 July 2005 London bombings. Terrorism in Britain during the 1970s through the 1990s was mostly due to the Northern Ireland conflict, and it was only after the 2005 incidents that the presence of radical political Islam in Britain was widely recognised and studied.

Dawatul Islam is an Islamist organisation based in London founded in 1978 by the Jamaat-e-Islami Pakistan-originated UK Islamic Mission to cater to East Bengali Muslims in Britain after the founding of the country of Bangladesh in 1971.

Syrian Islamist Omar Bakri Muhammad moved to the United Kingdom in 1986 and established a chapter of Hizb ut-Tahrir and later Al-Muhajiroun ("The Emigrants"), which was proscribed under the Terrorism Act 2000 on 14 January 2010.

Social disturbance began in the Muslim community in England in 1988 with the publication of the satirical novel The Satanic Verses in London. The book was condemned with a fatwa the following year.

In 1989, the now defunct Islamic Party of Britain was founded by a Sheffield-born convert. The Islamic Forum of Europe was founded in 1990, reported by former members of the Jamaat-e-Islami-affiliated group Dawatul Islam, with whom it came into conflict over management of the East London Mosque "throughout the late 1980s" resulting in "two High Court injunctions" in 1990 in "response to violence" at the mosque.

The Islamic Society of Britain (ISB) was set up in 1990 to promote Islamic values. The Young Muslims UK, established in 1984, was incorporated into ISB as its youth wing.

== Islamism and Terrorism Post–2005 ==
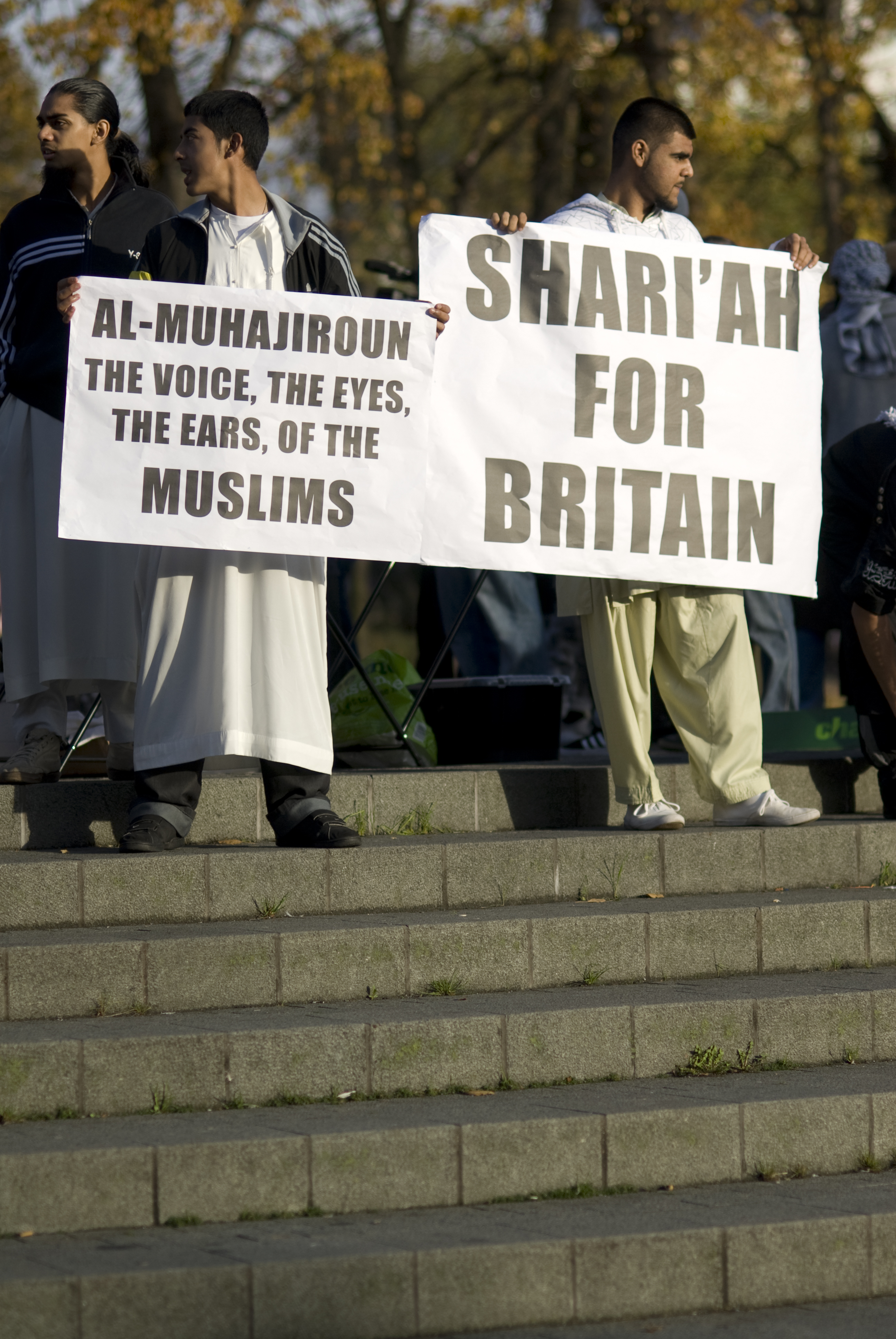
Public demonstration in the United Kingdom for sharia, October 2009

=== 2005–2016: Developments ===
The Saved Sect operated from 2005 until 2006, when it was banned. The extent of the phenomenon was illustrated during the Jyllands-Posten Muhammad cartoons controversy of 2006, when Al Ghurabaa, successor organisation to the disbanded Al-Muhajiroun, called Muslims to "Kill those who insult the Prophet Muhammad", resulting in extensive protests in London.

Following the 2005 terror attacks, the phenomenon of Islamism within the resident Muslim population (political Islamic activism versus violent Islamic extremism) in Britain received wider interest. An early publication was Londonistan: How Britain is Creating a Terror State Within (2006). Undercover Mosque aired in 2007 (with a 2008 sequel). Islam4UK, led by Anjem Choudary (a British Pakistani born in the UK in 1967), had been active since 2009. It has also been banned under the Terrorism Act 2000 on 14 January 2010.

Since 2006, the Islamic Forum of Europe (IFE) has been under scrutiny as fostering Islamist politics among Bangladeshi immigrants. IFE and the East London Mosque, have hosted extremist preachers including Anwar al-Awlaki. A Dispatches documentary that aired on 1 March 2010 described the IFE as an organisation with goals that it alleged were incompatible with British democratic values. Dispatches quoted Azad Ali, the IFE's community affairs coordinator, as saying, "Democracy, if it means at the expense of not implementing the sharia, of course no one agrees with that". Responding in a comment piece in The Guardian, Inayat Bunglawala of the Muslim Council of Britain suggested that many of the people interviewed on the program had "hidden agendas of their own" suggesting that Jim Fitzpatrick's claim of the Labour Party having been "infiltrated" by IFE was motivated by upcoming elections. The IFE and Young Muslim Organisation (YMO) were featured in the book The Islamist (2007) by Ed Husain, wherein he explains that the YMO attracts mainly English-speaking Asian youths, providing circles or talks daily at the East London Mosque; while teaching about Islam, it covers the political system of the religion.

The Islamic Human Rights Commission (IHRC, established in 1997) was classified as "a radical Islamist organisation that uses the language and techniques of a human rights lobbying group to promote an extremist agenda" by the Stephen Roth Institute. In the same year (1997), the Muslim Council of Britain was created, which became a prominent representative body for various Muslim organizations in the United Kingdom.

The first Sharia court, also known as a Sharia council, began operating in the United Kingdom in 1982, and the number of operating courts has grown to 85 by 2024. A Times investigation found that there is a growing number of Muslims from across Europe and North America seeking the services of British sharia courts, with the UK now dubbed as the "Western capital" for Sharia courts.

In 2013, there were Muslim patrol incidents in London. In the same year, British soldier Fusilier Lee Rigby of the Royal Regiment of Fusiliers was attacked and killed by two Islamist terrorists in Woolwich, southeast London, leading to major protests as well as a Parliamentary inquiry focused on counter-terrorism.

=== 2017–present: Ideology vs Violence ===
Several major terrorist attacks in the UK occurred in 2017, making it a particularly violent year. Eight people were killed and 48 were injured in the London Bridge Attack, with the perpetrators being labeled "radical Islamists". The attack was later found to be sponsored by the Islamic State (ISIS). Later, more than 130 imams condemned the attackers, refused them Islamic burials, and said in a statement that the terrorists did not represent Islam. In response, just a few days later, Darren Osborne perpetrated the 2017 Finsbury Park van attack, killing 1 and injuring 11 individuals. While not Islamist (the attack was an Islamophobic terrorist attack), it demonstrated the wider context of religiously motivated violence in the UK. September 2017 saw the Parsons Green train bombing attack which injured 30 people. A major development throughout 2017 was that all attacks led to an increased distancing of mainstream Muslim organisations, such as the Muslim Council of Britain, from radical Islamic Ideologies.

In 2025, the UK witnessed the Manchester synagogue attack, which was widely viewed as an antisemitic hate crime attack. Prime minister Keir Starmer in an address said that the attacker targeted Jews simply because they are Jewish. Other reports stated that the assailant was motivated by the Israeli-Gaza war with witness accounts saying he sought revenge for the killings in the Middle East. Mainstream British Muslim groups and leaders condemned the violence and expressed their support and solidarity with the Jewish community, stressing that these acts of violence do not in any way represent Islam, which was followed by continued Muslim participation in interfaith initiatives and efforts to counter extremist ideologies.

== See also ==
- CONTEST
- Criticism of Islamism
- Islamic extremism
- Islamic Sharia Council
- Islamophobia in the United Kingdom
- Londonistan
- Mosques and Imams National Advisory Board
- United Kingdom and the Islamic State
