= Policy Research Centre =

Islamic religious think tank based in London

The Policy Research Centre is a UK think tank based at The Islamic Foundation in Markfield, Leicestershire. The Centre specialises in research, policy advice and training on British Muslim related issues. It brings together policy, academic and community expertise to inform and help shape current policy thinking. It has worked with civil society, Muslim communities and local and national governments.

== Aims and services ==
It seeks to:

- Enhance the policy responses to some of the critical issues being debated today around identity, citizenship and security.
- Raise awareness of social policy concerns impacting upon the lives of Muslim citizens.
- Inform communities about policy debates and the policy making process.

Its services include:

- Publishing research, briefing and seminar papers to facilitate understanding and dialogue with think tanks, policy experts and journalists.
- Providing training to enhance understanding of Muslim communities and to develop policy related capacity.
- Responding to government consultations, papers and policy proposals or reforms.
- Conducting surveys and opinion polls to monitor and comment on public opinion and Muslim opinion on pertinent issues and map Muslim policy concerns.
- Providing resources, data and briefings to community groups.

== Staff ==
- Dilwar Hussain heads the Policy Research Centre. He is a writer, researcher and co-author of many publications
- Naved Siddiqui is a Research Fellow. He is the lead trainer and coordinator of the centre's training services.
- Samina Ali
- Sughra Ahmed is a Research Fellow. Her area of research is currently young Muslims in Britain.

== Research ==
- Mapping European Muslim Policy Concerns with the Open Society Institute
- Research on Smoking Cessation material for NHS Heywood, Middleton and Rochdale
- Differences Between Violent and Non-violent Radicalisation with Demos
- Preventing Violent Extremism – Handbook for the Local Government Association
- Mapping Muslim women's organisations in Leicester, for the Leicester Partnership
- Radicalisation in Europe with the Change Institute
