= The Young Muslims UK =

Muslim youth group

- Abbreviation: YMUK
- Formation: 1984; 42 years ago
- Founder: Khurram Murad
- Founded at: Leicester
- Headquarters: Markfield (Leicestershire)
- Main organ: Trends
- Parent organization: Islamic Society of Britain
- Affiliations: Muslim Council of Britain; The Islamic Foundation; UK Islamic Mission

The Young Muslims UK (YMUK) was established in Leeds in 1984 and celebrated its 25th anniversary in 2009. It became the youth wing of the Islamic Society of Britain (ISB) in 1990 with an aim to "provide a vehicle for committed young British Muslims to combine their knowledge, skills and efforts for the benefit of one another and British society as a whole."

== History ==
The Young Muslims UK (YMUK) was set up as a youth organisation by two British Pakistani organisations, The Islamic Foundation and the UK Islamic Mission (UKIM), both linked to Jamaat-e-Islami Pakistan. (Note: The organisations deny that they are linked to Jamaat-e-Islami, but there are clear links according to scholars.) The first director of The Islamic Foundation, Khurram Murad, had the vision to realise that British-born Muslims would need their own organisation and started YMUK. Under his guidance, 27 young Muslims representing various local youth groups met in Leeds in 1984, and decided to form an organisation. The headquarters of the organisation was in the Islamic Foundation in Leicester and its branches initially operated out of the mosques run by UKIM. The general secretary of UKIM, Zahid Parvez, served on its first governing council. Many of the initial members were youth brought up in families subscribing to the Jamaat-e-Islami ideology and were associated with UKIM.

Even though the YMUK was established by the Islamic Foundation in association with UKIM, it was intended to become autonomous, catering to the English-speaking Muslim youth. Its activities are run in English with a mix of religious teaching and social events such as football matches. It runs an annual summer camp. In the 1980s, it had printed t-shirts with the slogan, "putting the fun back into fundamentalism". As the organisation grew and newcomers joined, they were less deferential to the UKIM, and sought English-speaking preachers such as the African-American convert Siraj Wahaj and classically trained American Islamic scholar Sheikh Hamza Yusuf. Arab Muslim Brotherhood exiles living in the UK and Islamist politicians from Malaysia were also strong influences.

The activities of the new generation of YMUK activists in the 1980s were regarded as "cutting edge". They promoted modern types of Islamic music, set up Muslim community radio stations, and published a current affairs magazine called Trends. The magazine covered Islamic politics rather than spirituality, with such topics as foreign mujahideen during the war in Bosnia, visits to Afghan training camps by British Muslims, interview of a Hamas spokesperson, interview of the Tunisian Islamist leader Rached Ghannouchi etc. In an article entitled "Jihad: Offensive or Defensive?", the liberation of lands such as Eritrea, Philippines, Tashkent, Samarkand, Uzbekistan, Azerbaijan and parts of China from non-Muslim rule was described as an obligation of the worldwide Muslim community. The organisation conducted foreign expeditions, such as a seventy-five member delegation to meet Muslim Brotherhood activists in Egypt, a summer vacation trip to Sudan, and a trip to Pakistan. At regional meetings and annual camps, speakers discuss worldwide Islamic struggles such as in Afghanistan and Kashmir. The Islamic mission of dawah (proselytisation) is presented as an all-encompassing alternative to western materialism.

In 1988, the Young Muslims UK, along with its two parent organisations, played a critical role in driving the campaign against Salman Rushdie for the book Satanic Verses. Protests swept the entire South Asian Muslim community in Britain and enhanced the stature of the organisations.

The older members that outgrew YMUK established a new organisation in 1990 called Islamic Society of Britain (ISB). It has been run by the former members of YMUK since then. In 1994, ISB became the parent organisation of YMUK. The two organisations include women in their leadership, contrary to the ideology of the original parent organisations, and attract members beyond the British Pakistani community.

=== External links ===
The Young Muslims UK is an affiliate body of the Muslim Council of Britain.

In the 1990s, YMUK and ISB developed links with the Muslim Brotherhood of Egypt and their breakaway group among the Sudanese. The Sudanese Islamist Hassan al-Turabi, said to be the ideological power behind president Omar al-Bashir, met YMUK members on his visits to London and hosted a delegation of theirs in Sudan. The Muslim Brotherhood exiles living in Britain provided further nurturing to YMUK and ISB, running study circles for them and providing a syllabus inspired by Hasan al-Banna, the original founder of Muslim Brotherhood. Some YMUK members spent time at a Muslim Brotherhood-run college in France.

In 1995, the organisation participated in the Euro-Islam conference in Stockholm, Sweden, organised on a directive from the Swedish Ministry for Foreign Affairs. The youth section of this conference was dominated by participants with connections to the Muslim Brotherhood and similar forms of ideology, for instance the Jamat-i Islami, according to French islamologist Gilles Kepel. This conference resulted in the founding of the Forum of European Youth and Student Organisations (FEMYSO).

== Reception ==
YMUK has been praised for its forward thinking and ability to make Islam relevant to British society: "The establishment of organisations such as Young Muslims UK is a step in the right direction, offering as they do resources for Muslims seeking to make Islam relevant to their own hybrid condition."

A key feature that distinguishes YMUK from other Islamic organisations is its lack of discrimination to different Islamic schools of thought: "Some organisations, such as Young Muslims UK, have decided that one's choice of Madh'hab or school of jurisprudence should be a personal choice. Where the organisation needs to take a public position on some issue, however, this is decided by a process of Shura (consultation) in which the views of various madhahhib are considered."

== Notable members ==
These individuals were part of the organisation at some point in its history:

- Ajmal Masroor, television presenter and a candidate for the Liberal Democrats.
- Inayat Bunglawala, Assistant Secretary-General of the Muslim Council of Britain. He Joined the YMUK in 1987.
- Sarah Joseph, editor of Emel magazine.

== Notable Recent Projects/Events ==
- Heroes 2007
- YM London Treasure Hunt
- The Young Muslims Talent Search
- The Muslim Teenager Tour
- YM360

== Bibliography ==
- Bowen, Innes (2014), Medina in Birmingham, Najaf in Brent: Inside British Islam, Hurst, ISBN 978-1-84904-529-2
- Geaves, R. (1996), Sectarian influences within Islam in Britain with special reference to the concepts of "ummah" and "community" (PDF), Department of Theology and Religious Studies, University of Leeds
- Lewis, Phillip (1994), "Being Muslim and Being British: The Dynamics of Islamic Reconstruction in Bradford", in Roger Ballard; Marcus Banks (eds.), Desh Pardesh: The South Asian Presence in Britain, C. Hurst & Co. Publishers, pp. 58–87, ISBN 978-1-85065-091-1
- Vidino, Lorenzo (2021), "Aims and Methods of Europe's Muslim Brotherhood", in Noor Dahri (ed.), The Devils Rebirth: The Terror Triangle of Ikhwan, IRGC and Hezbollah, Vij Books India Pvt Ltd, ISBN 9789390439652
