= Ratby =

Village in Leicestershire, England

Coordinates: 52.648°N 1.242°W

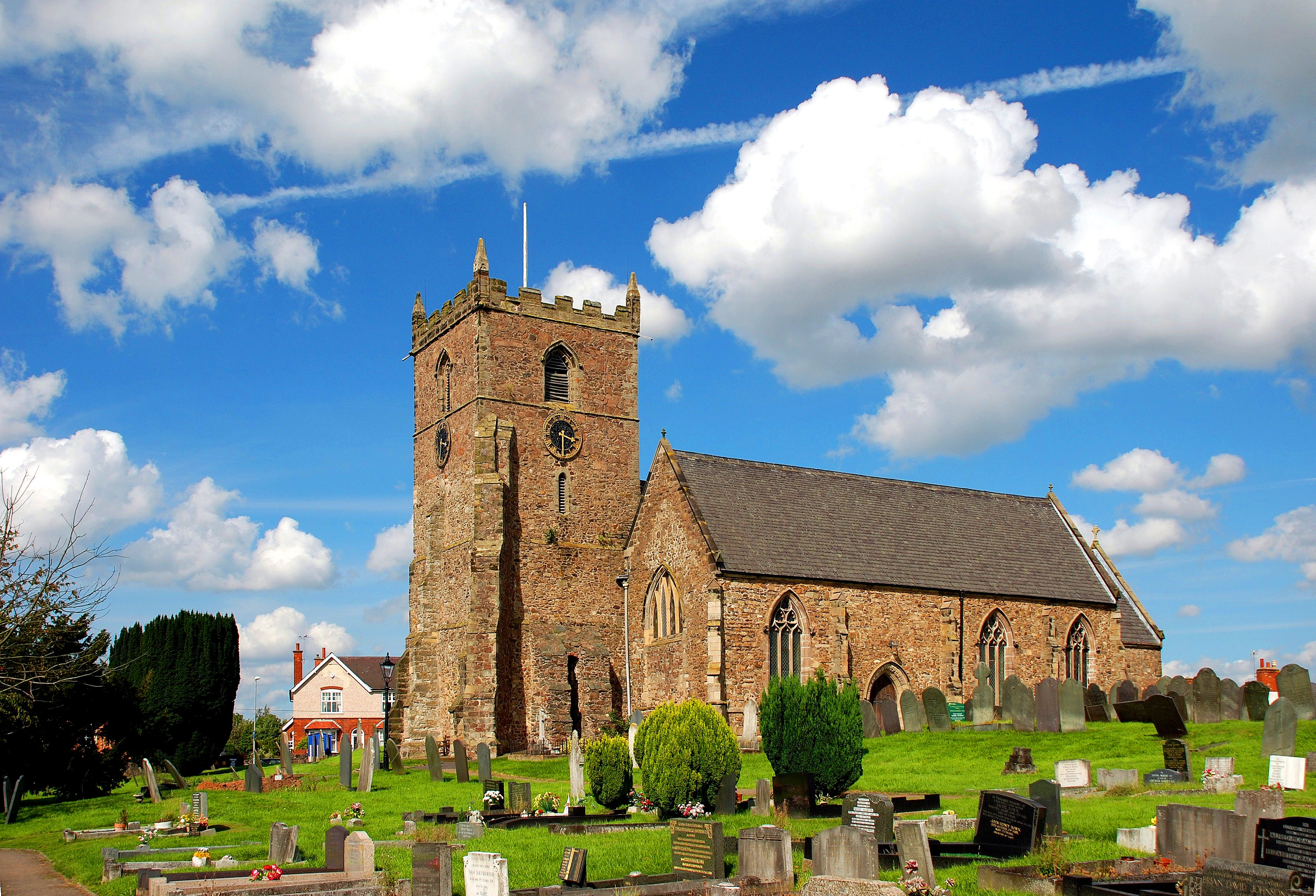
- St Philip & St James Church, Ratby

- Location within Leicestershire
- Population: 4,468 (2011 Census)
- District: Hinckley and Bosworth
- Shire county: Leicestershire
- Region: East Midlands
- Country: England
- Sovereign state: United Kingdom
- Post town: LEICESTER
- Postcode district: LE6
- Dialling code: 0116
- Police: Leicestershire
- Fire: Leicestershire
- Ambulance: East Midlands
- UK Parliament: Mid Leicestershire

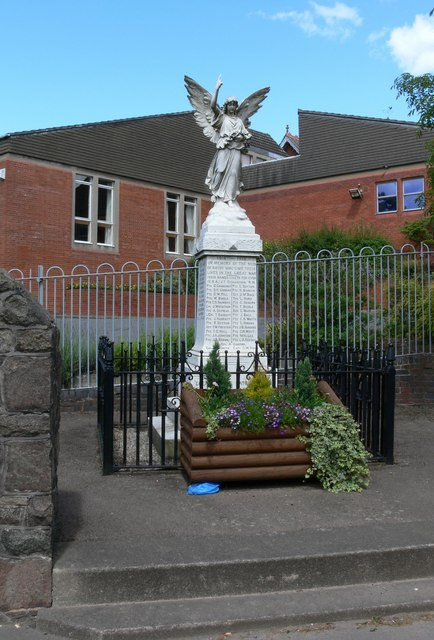
Ratby War Memorial

Ratby is a commuter village and civil parish in the Hinckley and Bosworth district of Leicestershire, England, west of Leicester and just south east of the M1 motorway (with nearby Groby on the north eastern side). The population at the 2011 census was 4,468. Other nearby places include Field Head, Kirby Muxloe, Glenfield and Markfield. Ratby is part of the Leicester Urban Area.

== Name ==
Ratby is one of three nearby settlements whose name preserves the Brittonic word for "ramparts" (cf. Gaelic rath), along with Ratcliffe-upon-Soar and the Roman ruins at Leicester, known as Ratae Corieltauvorum. The suffix -by (/-bi/) is Old Norse for a farmstead or settlement.

== History ==
The oldest known human settlement in Ratby was at the Bury Camp on the edge of Ratby, an Iron Age encampment dating back approximately 3,000 years. Later, the Roman army adapted the camp for use as a temporary fort in around 50 AD.

The next oldest structure is the historic Church of St Philip & St James, called Ratby Church, built in four stages from the 13th century to 15th century and restored by Nicholas Joyce in 1881. The church was appropriated to Leicester Abbey in 1291 and afterwards to Nuneaton Priory. There are also some cottages dating back several centuries.

For most of its history, Ratby was a small agricultural village with a few farms and the open 3-field plan until enclosure in the 18th century. From 1346 till the 19th century Ratby was in the hundred of Sparkenhoe. In the 1830s the inhabitants were mainly employed in frame-work knitting; the population at that time was 1025. The chief landowner was the Earl of Stamford and Warrington who was lord of the manor and patron of the vicarage. The parish was enclosed in 1770.

In the 20th century a war memorial called the "Angel of Peace" was constructed after the First World War and unveiled in 1920 by the wartime British Army Commander-in-Chief Field Marshal Haig.

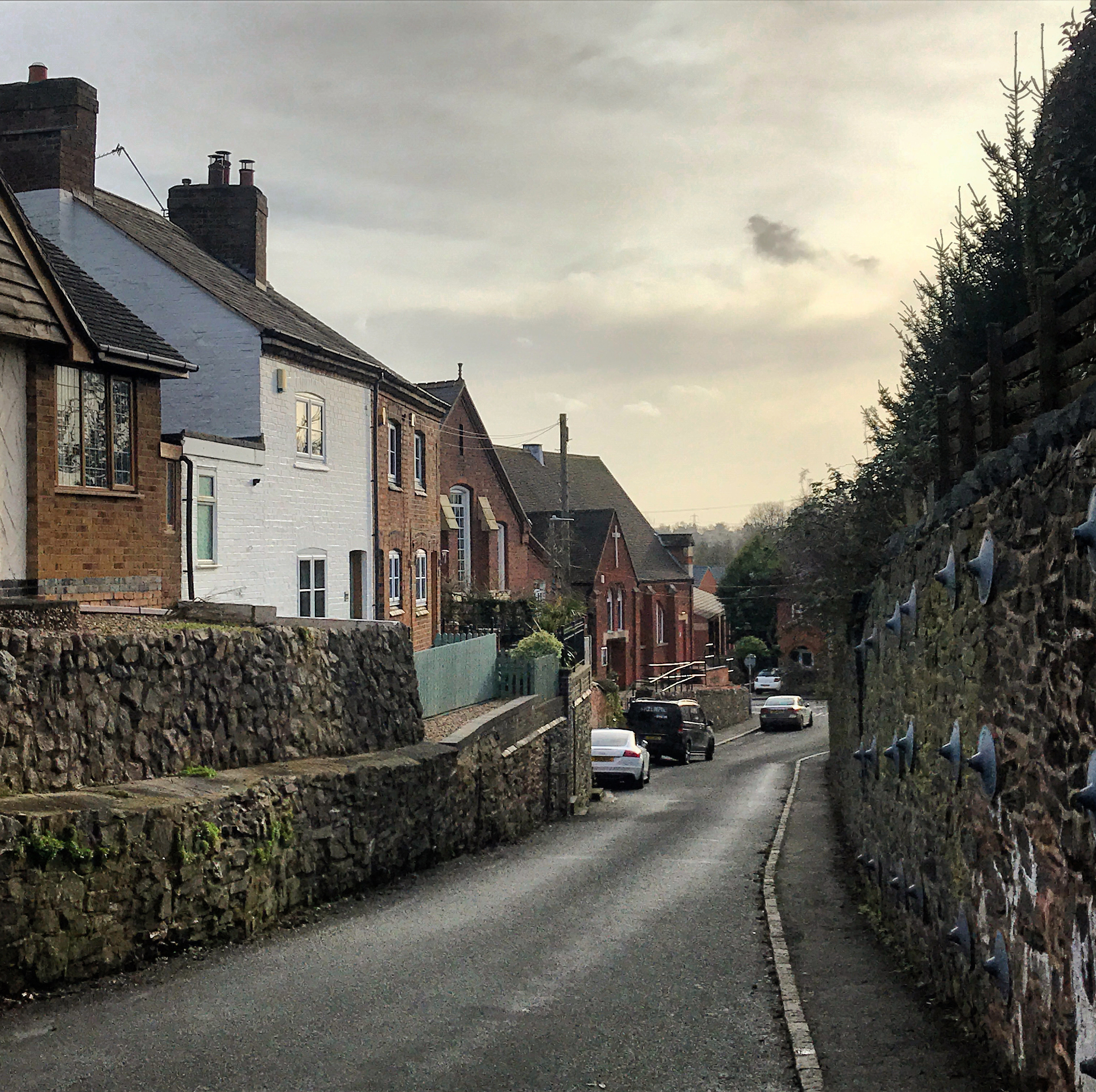
Chapel Lane, Ratby

== Facilities ==
Ratby has a number of facilities that support its status as a highly sought after area within Leicestershire. Ratby Sports Club is home to the local football club and cricket teams. Ratby Primary School is also situated towards the village centre opposite the library. There are a total of three pubs in the village: the Bull's Head, the Plough Inn, and the Railway at the other end of the village. Other amenities are a hairdressers, the village barber shop, several beauty shops, a cake shop, a post office and village hall.

There is currently a review of the library by the county council. It is possible that the library will close if a volunteer group has not been found to run it. Ratby is only 1 mile from Junction 21a of the M1 motorway and situated 5 miles from the city centre of Leicester, with frequent Arriva Fox County bus services to and from the city.

In addition to all of these facilities the village is home to Ratby Cooperative Brass Band. The band rehearse in their own room on Taverner Drive and are highly regarded in the brass band movement particularly for their excellent work with youth. The band has around 150 members. Ratby band was founded in its present form in 1906, although records suggest that a band existed in the village many years before that date. It is not the oldest brass band in England, the Stalybridge Old Band was founded in 1809.
