= The Islamic Foundation =

Islamic education and research organisation

- موَسسہَ اسلامی
- Founded: 1973; 53 years ago
- Founder: Khurshid Ahmad
- Founded at: Leicester
- Type: Islamic education and research organisation
- Purpose: implementation of Islam in the modern world projecting the image of Islam education of Muslims
- Location: Markfield, United Kingdom
- Coordinates: 52.67607°N 1.27250°W
- Website: www.islamic-foundation.org.uk

The Islamic Foundation (Urdu: موَسسہَ اسلامی, also called the Islamic Foundation UK) is Jamaat-e-Islami's research and publishing house in the United Kingdom. It was established in Leicester in 1973 by two high-ranking Pakistani activists of Jamaat-e-Islami, Khurshid Ahmad and Khurram Murad. Its objectives are to research Islam in the modern world, to provide research regarding Islam in Britain and Europe, and to meet the educational needs of Muslims. It is currently located in a 10-acre campus at Markfield, a village close to Leicester, which also houses the Foundation's educational arm, the Marfield Institute of Higher Education.

== History ==
Jamaat-e-Islami is an Islamist movement founded in 1941 by Abul A'la Maududi an Islamic Scholar who was a Founding Father of the Islamic State of Pakistan. After the establishment of Pakistan in 1947, Jamaat-e-Islami split into multiple branches and has since expanded across the world famously in Afghanistan, Bangladesh, India. It is the Pakistani wing of Jamaat-e-Islami that spawned The Islamic Foundation in UK, sending one of its vice-presidents, Khurshid Ahmad, to set up the organisation. Ahmad split his time between Pakistan and the UK throughout his lifetime. Another senior Pakistani Jamaat activist Khurram Murad became the first director of the Foundation.

The Islamic Foundation was established in the city of Leicester in 1973. By that time, there was another Jamaat organisation in the UK, called the UK Islamic Mission (UKIM), whose programme was to run a network of study circles and mosques. The two organisations do not a have a formal link, but have an overlap of functionaries. In its early years, the Islamic Foundation also established about twenty mosques and community centres. Later it shifted to publishing Islamic research, about economics, Christian–Muslim relations, Muslim Central Asia and Islam in the modern world. It translated and printed many of Maududi's works. It also published educational materials for children, and a bi-weekly magazine called Impact International. In 1984, it spawned a youth movement called Young Muslims UK, based in Leicester with branches operating out of UKIM's mosque network. National Association of Muslim Youth is another organisation based in Leicester.

In 1990, the Islamic Foundation moved to the site of a former hospital in the village of Markfield, close to Leicester. It built a 10-acre campus, naming its buildings after key Islamist thinkers: Hassan al-Banna Hall, (Note: Hassan al-Banna is the founder of the Egyptian Muslim Brotherhood.) ibn Taimiyya Block and Maududi Hall etc.

In 2000, a college called the Markfield Institute of Higher Education (MIHE) was established in the campus. It is associated to the University of Gloucestershire, offering courses leading to modern qualifications. It also offers BA and MA in Islamic studies, an MA in Islamic finance and a certificate course in Muslim chaplaincy.

=== Young Muslims UK ===
Even though Young Muslims UK (YMUK) was established by the Islamic Foundation in association with UKIM, it was meant to become autonomous in due course. It caters to the English-speaking Muslim youth. Its activities are run in English with a mix of religious teaching and social events such as football matches. It runs an annual summer camp. In the 1980s, it had printed t-shirts with the slogan, "putting the fun back into fundamentalism". As the organisation grew and newcomers joined, they were less deferential to the UKIM, and sought English-speaking preachers such as the African-American convert Siraj Wahaj and classically trained American Islamic scholar Sheikh Hamza Yusuf. Arab Muslim Brotherhood exiles living in the UK and Islamist politicians from Malaysia were also strong influences.

The activities of the new generation of YMUK activists in the 1980s were regarded as "cutting edge". They promoted modern types of Islamic music, set up Muslim community radio stations, and published a current affairs magazine called Trends. The magazine covered Islamic politics rather than spirituality, with such topics as foreign mujahideen during the war in Bosnia, visits to Afghan training camps by British Muslims, interview of a Hamas spokesperson, interview of the Tunisian Islamist leader Rached Ghannouchi etc. In an article entitled "Jihad: Offensive or Defensive?", the liberation of lands such as Eritrea, Philippines, Tashkent, Samarkand, Uzbekistan, Azerbaijan and parts of China from non-Muslim rule was described as an obligation of the worldwide Muslim community. The organisation conducted foreign expeditions, such as a seventy-five member delegation to meet Muslim Brotherhood activists in Egypt, a summer vacation trip to Sudan, and a trip to Pakistan. At regional meetings and annual camps, speakers discuss worldwide Islamic struggles such as in Afghanistan and Kashmir. The Islamic mission of dawah (proselytisation) is presented as an all-encompassing alternative to western materialism.

After growing out of YMUK, the older members established a new organisation called Islamic Society of Britain (ISB). In 1994, the ISB became the parent organisation of YMUK. The two organisations included women in their leadership, contrary to the ideology of its original parent, and attracted members beyond the British Pakistani community.

=== Campaign against Salman Rushdie ===
In 1988, the Islamic Foundation, along with UKIM, Young Muslims OK and Impact International, played a critical role in driving the campaign against Salman Rushdie for the book Satanic Verses. Protests swept the entire South Asian Muslim community in Britain and enhanced the stature of the Islamic Foundation.

== Bibliography ==
- Lewis, Phillip (1994), "Being Muslim and Being British: The Dynamics of Islamic Reconstruction in Bradford", in Roger Ballard; Marcus Banks (eds.), Desh Pardesh: The South Asian Presence in Britain, C. Hurst & Co. Publishers, pp. 58–87, ISBN 978-1-85065-091-1
- Bowen, Innes (2014), Medina in Birmingham, Najaf in Brent: Inside British Islam, Hurst, ISBN 978-1-84904-529-2
- Vidino, Lorenzo (2021), "Aims and Methods of Europe's Muslim Brotherhood", in Noor Dahri (ed.), The Devils Rebirth: The Terror Triangle of Ikhwan, IRGC and Hezbollah, Vij Books India Pvt Ltd, ISBN 9789390439652
