= UK Islamic Mission =

Islamic organization based in the United Kingdom

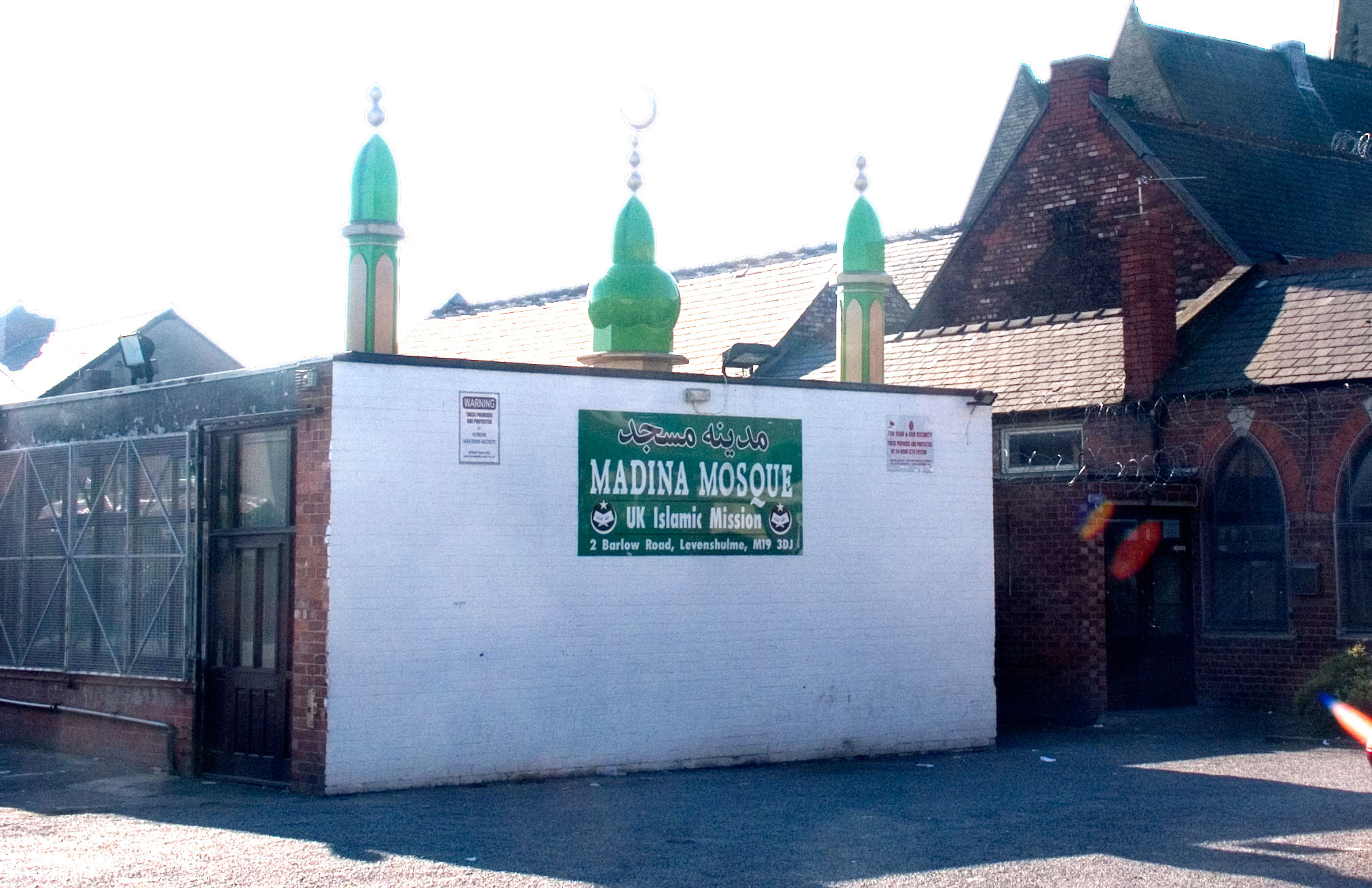
Madina Mosque / UK Islamic Mission, Barlow Road, Levenshulme, Manchester, England

UK Islamic Mission (UKIM) is a registered charity and Islamic, membership-based organization located in the United Kingdom. It was established in 1963 as a node of Jamaat-e-Islami to promote charitable causes, community service, and religious education. The organization currently has 43 branches across the United Kingdom. These branches include mosques, charity centers, and community centers. According to the UKIM recruitment pack, there are an estimated 1200 associate and full members. An independent, albeit older source from 1992, estimated membership at 475 individuals, in addition to over 50,000 "sympathizers". The organization has a hierarchical structure with a small, well-trained group of members who promote the organizations civic, educational, charitable and religious goals. Outside of the UK, UKIM sustains significant international influence by engaging with charitable efforts in 19 countries including Sierra Leone, Yemen, Palestine, Turkey, Albania, and Myanmar.

== History ==
It is registered with the Charity Commission for England and Wales, and the Fundraising Standards Board (FRSB), the UK's independent regulator for charity fundraising.

UKIM that was formed in 1962 to "cater for the needs of a new growing Muslim community" in the UK. The founding association was composed of young Pakistani and other South Asian immigrants and students that had partaken in Islamist movements in their home countries, with the hope of retaining their strong faith in a secular society. They congregated in a study circle at the East London Mosque, ultimately leading to a strong association which culminated in UKIM's founding. In the coming decades, UKIM aimed to meet the needs of the British Muslim community by "establishing mosques for worship, catering for the religious education of children, organizing religious and community functions, and producing basic literature on Islam in English."

UKIM's founding members had close ties to Jamaat-e Islami, and its founder Maulana Maududi was inspired by the Muslim Brotherhood's founder Hassan al-Banna. According to Pew Research, UKIM has direct ties to Jammat-e Islami. Jamaat-e Islami is an Islamist political organization, which was founded in 1941 in British-Occupied India. Its main goal was promoting Islam through anti-imperialist strategies, in response to the British presence in South Asia. Today, its social and political presence is principally centered in Pakistan and Bangladesh.

One of its longest standing members, who served as its President from 1966 to 1973, was Maulana Habib-ur Rahman from Manchester. In 2017, he died and his funeral service at the British Muslim Heritage Centre was attended by more than 3000 mourners. The Manchester Evening News described him in an obituary as "a much-loved imam who respected all religions", and someone who was "regarded a strong voice for interfaith dialogue"

In 1994, the British Muslims Monthly Survey noted that "UKIM has a long and distinguished reputation for building harmonious community relations wherever it operates." The BMMS also stated that the group is "active with students, settled communities and in da'wah work" and is "inspired by the Jamaat-e-Islami party in Pakistan" and the "Islamic revivalist teachings of Abul A'la Maududi and others." As of 2017, however, there is no reference to the Jamaat-e-Islami or Mawdudi on the UKIM website.

In 2007, Channel 4 aired a documentary that displayed undercover footage from various mosques across the UK, including that of UKIM and its imams, to expose extremist language in religious spaces. The recordings included audio from a UKIM speakers.

In 2015, the UK Government released a report in which UKIM and other Islamic social and charitable organizations were tied to the Muslim Brotherhood. The report states that "

In 2016, UKIM started iCare, a branch of the organization focused on charitable work.

== Charitable Work and Education ==
As a charity UKIM spends its income, sourced primarily from donations, on financing relief for disasters involving humanitarian crises, and for educational missions typically in worship centers. In fiscal year 2025, UKIM retained an income of roughly £14.6 million, of which £10.35 million was expended on "charitable activities". UKIM promotes Zakat, a mandatory charitable duty equal to 2.5% of annual income. UKIM's official YouTube channel documents the organization's humanitarian missions in nations including Palestine, Yemen, Myanmar, and Bangladesh. The organization's international fundraising campaigns concentrate on territories and crises involving Muslim populations.

=== Promotion of Religious Education ===
UKIM prides itself on decades of institutional and well-organized Islamic education through madrassa-style learning environments. Currently, the organization states that it educates over 5,000 students across the UK. UKIM and adjacent organizations like IFE and MAB educate their students "through a range of activities, including formal and informal courses, retreats, workshops and seminars, as well as leadership training programmes for imams".

=== iCare ===
In 2016, UKIM established iCare as its designated charitable entity for individuals in the UK. iCare provides support to individuals regardless of their ethnicity or religion. This charitable arm of UKIM supports individuals facing food insecurity, homelessness, cold-related hardships, and general poverty.

== Connections to Extremism ==
A 2019 report from the UK Commission for Countering Extremism, asserts that there is an active network of intertwined Islamist organizations in the UK, including UKIM. Zahid Parvez, a "trustee and former long-time president of UKIM", is now the director of the Islamic Foundation's Markfield Institute of Higher Education. He was formerly the chief executive at The Muath Trust, and a trustee at the Islamic Foundation and Muslim Aid, and heavily involved with Young Muslims UK and the Islamic Society of Britain. Parvez has held declared controversial statements seen in opposition to Britain's liberal values such as gender equality and secular governance. The 2019 report references Parvez's statement that "political power is essential in the eyes of Islam" and that "the social conditions of the acceptance of an Islamic state must first be in place".

== Bibliography ==
- Bowen, Innes (2014), Medina in Birmingham, Najaf in Brent: Inside British Islam, Hurst, ISBN 978-1-84904-529-2
- Lewis, Phillip (1994), "Being Muslim and Being British: The Dynamics of Islamic Reconstruction in Bradford", in Roger Ballard; Marcus Banks (eds.), Desh Pardesh: The South Asian Presence in Britain, C. Hurst & Co. Publishers, pp. 58–87, ISBN 978-1-85065-091-1
- Perry, Damon Lee (2019), Mainstream Islamism in Britain: Educating for the ‘Islamic Revival, GOV.UK, Commission for Countering Terrorism, 7 Oct. 2019, www.gov.uk/government/publications/mainstream-islamism-in-britain-educating-for-the-islamic-revival.
- Revival in Motion? The Jamaat-e-Islami in Bangladesh and Pakistan. European Foundation For South Asian Studies, European Foundation For South Asian Studies, Apr. 2024, www.efsas.org/publications/articles-by-efsas/ji-bangladesh-and-pakistan-april-2024/.
- The Founding Mission. Emel Magazine , Dec. 2012, www.emel.com/article?id=108&a_id=2894.
