= Ataullah Siddiqui =

British scholar and academic (died 2020)

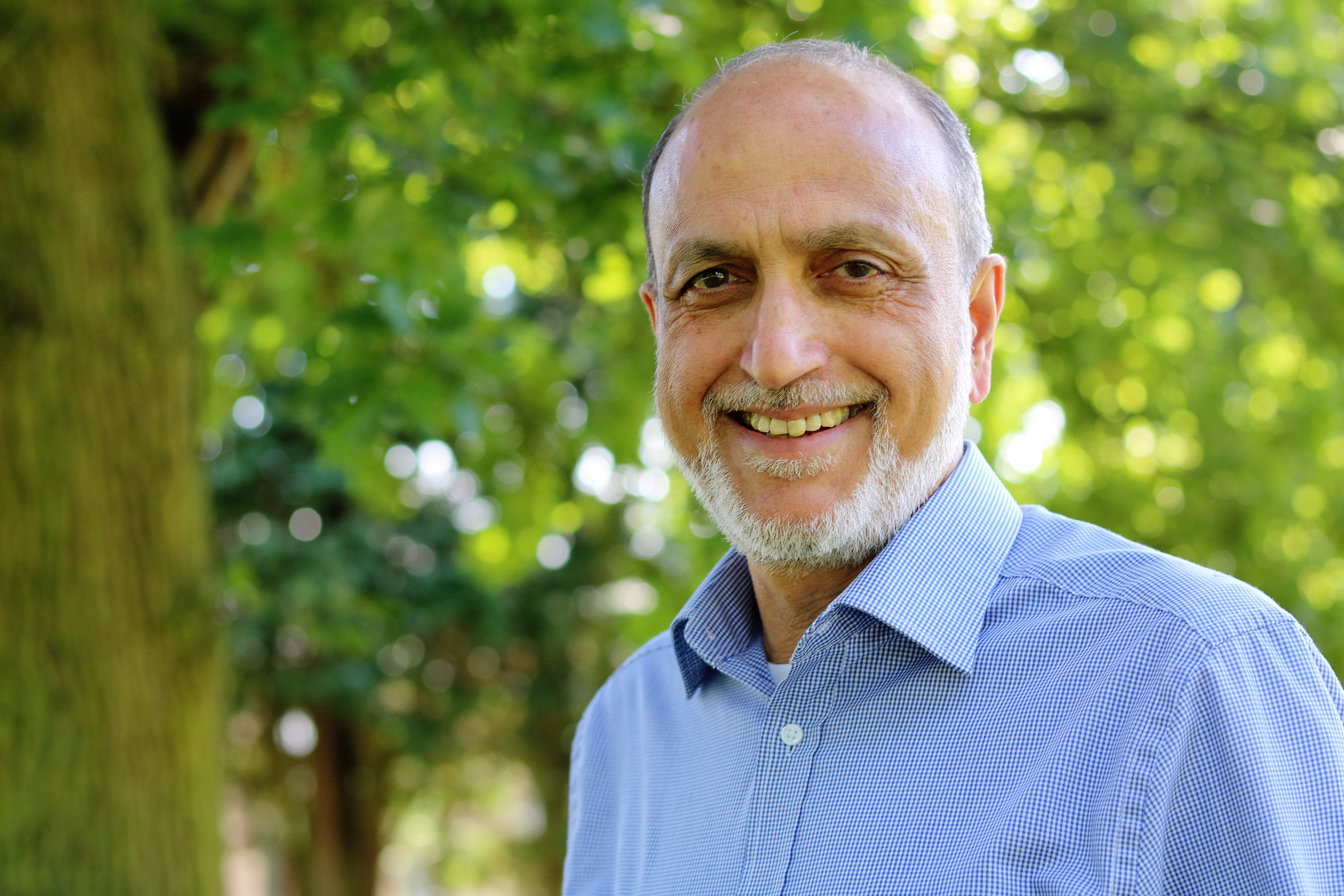
Dr Ataullah Siddiqui

Ataullah Siddiqui (died 8 November 2020) was a Muslim scholar and academic who did much to promote interfaith relations.

== English career ==
Of Indian origin, Ataullah Siddiqui completed his secondary education in Kalimpong and moved to Britain in 1982. There he became an academic, holding the position of professor of Christian-Muslim Relations and inter-faith understanding and course director of the certificate in Muslim chaplaincy course at Markfield Institute of Higher Education. Previously, he was the director of the institute from 2001 - 2008. He was also a visiting fellow in the School of Historical Studies, University of Leicester.

In the field of interfaith relations, he was a founder president and vice chair of the Christian Muslim Forum and a founder member of the Leicester Council of Faiths. His academic honours included a PhD from the University of Birmingham and an honorary doctorate from the University of Gloucestershire.

Siddiqui was the author of the 2007 report, commissioned by the UK government, entitled Islam at Universities in England: Meeting the Needs and Investing in the Future. He also contributed essays and articles, particularly on interfaith themes, to a number of other publications, and lectured widely.

He died of cancer in Birmingham on 8 November 2020 at the age of 66.

== Scholarly publications ==
- Christian-Muslim Dialogue in the Twentieth Century, Palgrave Macmillan (1997)
- Islam and Other Faiths [an edited collection of Ismail Raji Al-Faruqi's articles] (1998)
- Christians and Muslims in the Commonwealth: A Dynamic Role in the Future (co-edited 2001)
- British Secularism and Religion: Islam, Society and the State (edited with others), Markfield: Kube Publishing (2010)
- Beyond the Dysfunctional Family: Jews, Christians and Muslims in Dialogue with Each Other and With Britain (edited with others), London: The Manor House Abrahamic Group (2012)
- "Muslim Perceptions of Asian Christianity: A Survey", The Oxford Handbook of Christianity in Asia, pp. 379 - 391. New York: Oxford University Press (2014)
- "Sir Syed Ahmad Khan and the Honour of the Prophet: the Danish Cartoon Crisis in Perspective" in Kidwai, A.R. (Ed) Sir Syed Ahmad Khan: Muslim Renaissance Man of India – A bicentenary Commemorative Volume, pp. 308 – 321. New Delhi: Viva Books (2017)
- "Pope Francis, Islam and Dialogue" in Race. A, and Kasimow, H. eds. Pope Francis and Interreligious Dialogue: Religious Thinkers Engage with Recent Papal Initiatives, pp.169-80. London: Palgrave (2018)
- "Portrayal of Christianity and Use of Christian Sources in the Tafsir-i Sanai of Sanaullah Amritsari (d. 1948)", International Journal of Asian Christianity 2 (2019), pp. 89-100.
