= Abdullah Sahin =

Dr. Abdullah Sahin
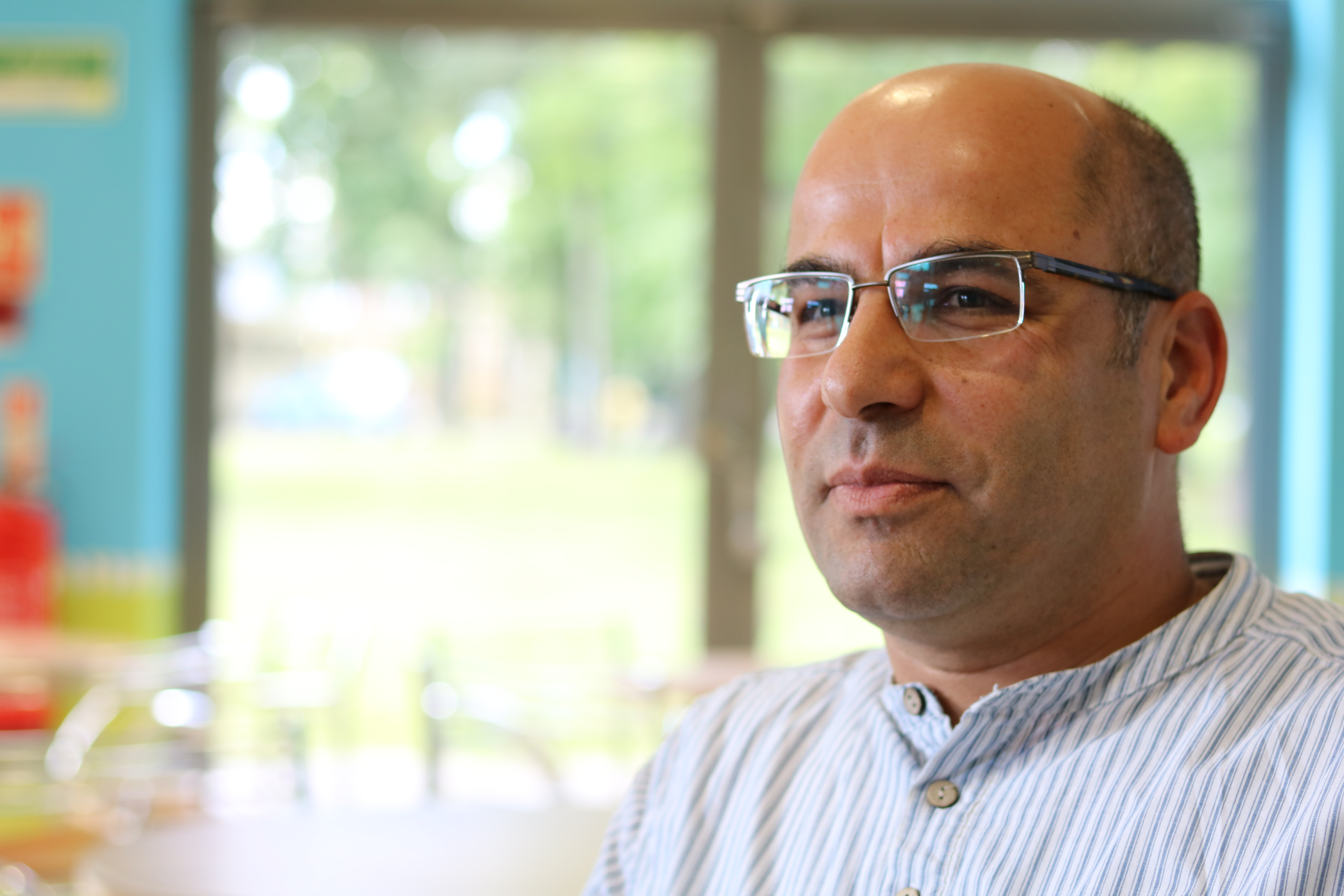
- Occupations: Academic, Reader in Islamic Education at the University of Warwick
- Years active: 1975–present

Abdullah Sahin is a reader in Islamic education at the University of Warwick. His academic work is focused on establishing Islamic education as "an interdisciplinary field of scholarly study, empirical inquiry and professional development." His major scholarly work in this regard is New Directions in Islamic Education: Pedagogy and Identity Formation published in 2013 by Kube Publishing.

Prior to joining Warwick, Sahin was the course leader for the MEd programme in Islamic education at the Markfield Institute of Higher Education. He has also taught at the universities of Birmingham, Aberdeen and Kuwait. He has written for the British newspaper The Guardian.

== Publications ==
Sahin's scholarly publications include:

- Sahin, Abdullah. 2016. The contribution of religions to the common good in pluralistic societies: an Islamic perspective. International Journal of Public Theology.
- Sahin, Abdullah. 2016. The future of Islamic education: a case for reform. RE Today, 33 (3), pp. 61–64.
- Sahin, Abdullah. 2016. Islam's heritage of critical education: the missing catalyst in addressing the crisis informing modern Muslim presence. The Muslim World Book Review, 36 (3), pp. 5–15.
- Sahin, Abdullah. 2014. Critical faithfulness: the heart of prophetic monotheism. The Muslim World Book Review, 35 (4), pp. 51–56.
- Sahin, Abdullah. 2012. The role of educational theology in reconciling faith and reason in Islam: reflections on the case of Ikhwan al-Safa. The Muslim World Book Review, 32 (4), pp. 6–17.
- Sahin, Abdullah. 2010. The dynamics of Muslims' sense of belonging: reflections on recent empirical research. The Muslim World Book Review, 29 (2), pp. 19–24.
- Francis, Leslie J., Sahin, Abdullah, Al-Failakawi, Fahad. 2008. Psychometric properties of two Islamic measures among young adults in Kuwait: the Sahin-Francis Scale of Attitude toward Islam and the Sahin Index of Islamic Moral Values. Journal of Muslim Mental Health, Vol.3 (No.1), pp. 9–24.
