= Field Head =

Coordinates: 52.680943°N 1.269251°W

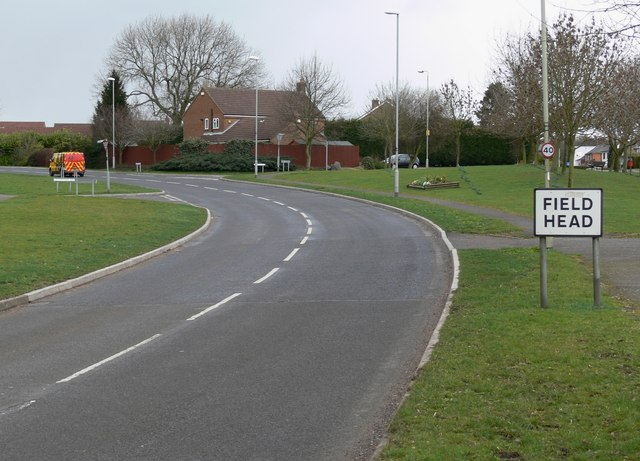

- Location within Leicestershire
- OS grid reference: SK4909
- District: Hinckley and Bosworth
- Shire county: Leicestershire
- Region: East Midlands
- Country: England
- Sovereign state: United Kingdom
- Post town: MARKFIELD
- Postcode district: LE67
- Dialling code: 01530
- Police: Leicestershire
- Fire: Leicestershire
- Ambulance: East Midlands

Field Head is a small settlement along the A511 on the edge of the Charnwood Forest in the Hinckley and Bosworth district of Leicestershire, England. It is mainly a ribbon development along the A511 from the top of Bradgate Hill to the Coach and Horses public house. However, in the 1960s development of an area South of the A511 effectively doubled the size of the settlement. It is part of the civil parish of Groby. The population is included in the civil parish of Ratby.

The settlement is most notable for the Fieldhead Hotel, which was originally a farmhouse built around 1672. It is a small hotel and restaurant, within the parish boundaries of Newtown Linford.
