= Markfield Institute of Higher Education =

Educational institution based in the United Kingdom

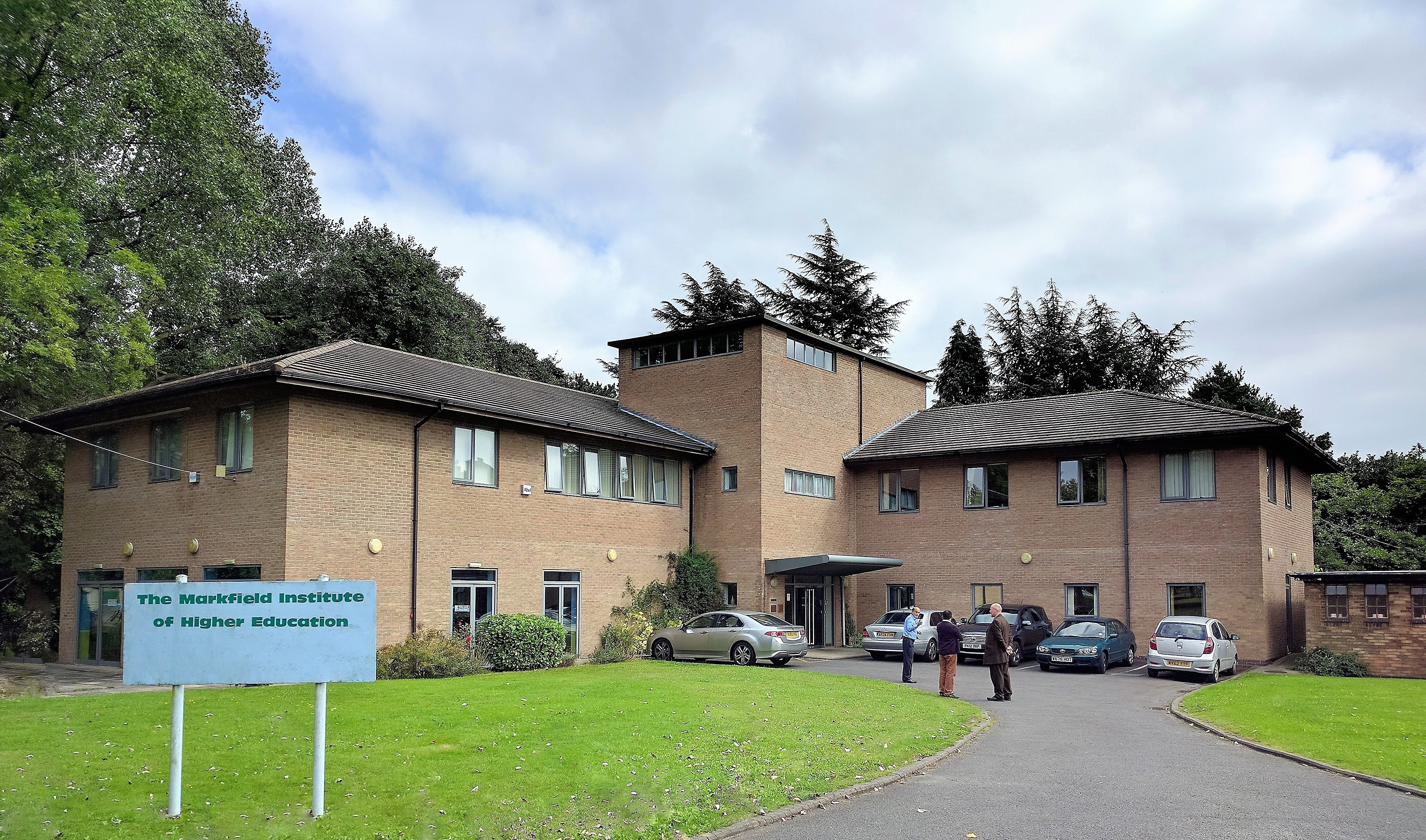
- The Markfield Institute of Higher Education
- Established: 2000
- Academic affiliations: Birmingham Newman University; St Mary's University
- Principal: Zahid Parvez
- Location: Markfield, England, UK; 52.6765°N 1.2716°W
- Website: https://www.mihe.ac.uk/

The Markfield Institute of Higher Education is an educational institution established by the Islamic Foundation UK at Markfield in Leicestershire, UK. Founded in 2000, the Institute specialises in Islamic subjects. It runs part-time and full-time courses, awarding BA and MA degrees validated by Birmingham Newman University, and PhD degrees validated by the St Mary's University. As of 2021, the Institute has graduated 1,500 students from degree courses and certificates in Islamic chaplaincy and 33 PhD students.

== History and ethos ==
The Markfield Institute was established in the year 2000 and was inaugurated by King Charles III. The institute aims at promoting understanding between Muslim communities in the West and the pluralistic societies they are a part of through the positive contributions of its graduates. The institute endeavours to “integrate the richness and high standards of traditional Islamic scholarship with the best of Western research techniques, academic rigour and critical inquiry.” Over the years, more than 750 students have graduated from the Institute.

== Location ==
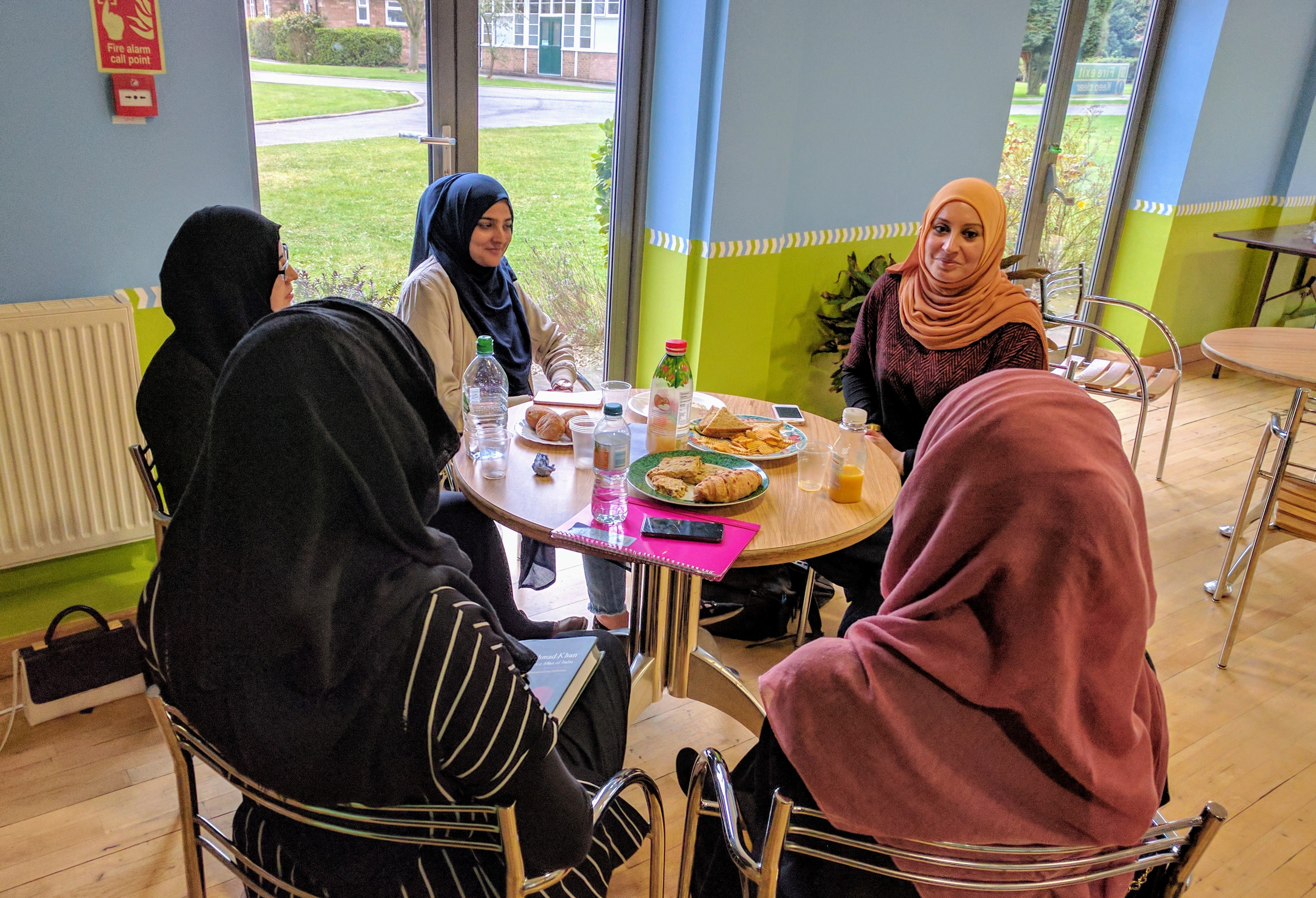
Shuruq Naguib (top right) speaking with students at the Markfield Institute of Higher Education

The Markfield Institute is located within the rural village of Markfield in the British Midlands. The village is situated within both National Forest and Charnwood Forest. The institute is roughly 100 miles from London.

== Scholars ==
=== Previous academic staff ===
Over the years, many scholars have served as part of the academic teaching staff at the Institute. They include:

- Ataullah Siddiqui (reader in religious pluralism and inter-faith relations)
- Fozia Bora (University of Leeds)
- Dilwar Hussain
- Abdullah Sahin (University of Warwick)

=== Visiting Lecturers ===
The Markfield Institute regularly invites scholars to visit and present their research in lectures that are open to the public. Various scholars have given lectures over the years. These include:

- Mohammad Akram Nadwi (Al-Salam Institute)

== Two-year BAs for Darul Uloom graduates ==
With Accreditation of Prior Learning (APL), the Markfield Institute allows students with prior training in Islamic studies, such as graduates of darul ulooms, to start their undergraduate degrees from the second year, thus allowing such students to complete a BA in two years.

== Facilities ==
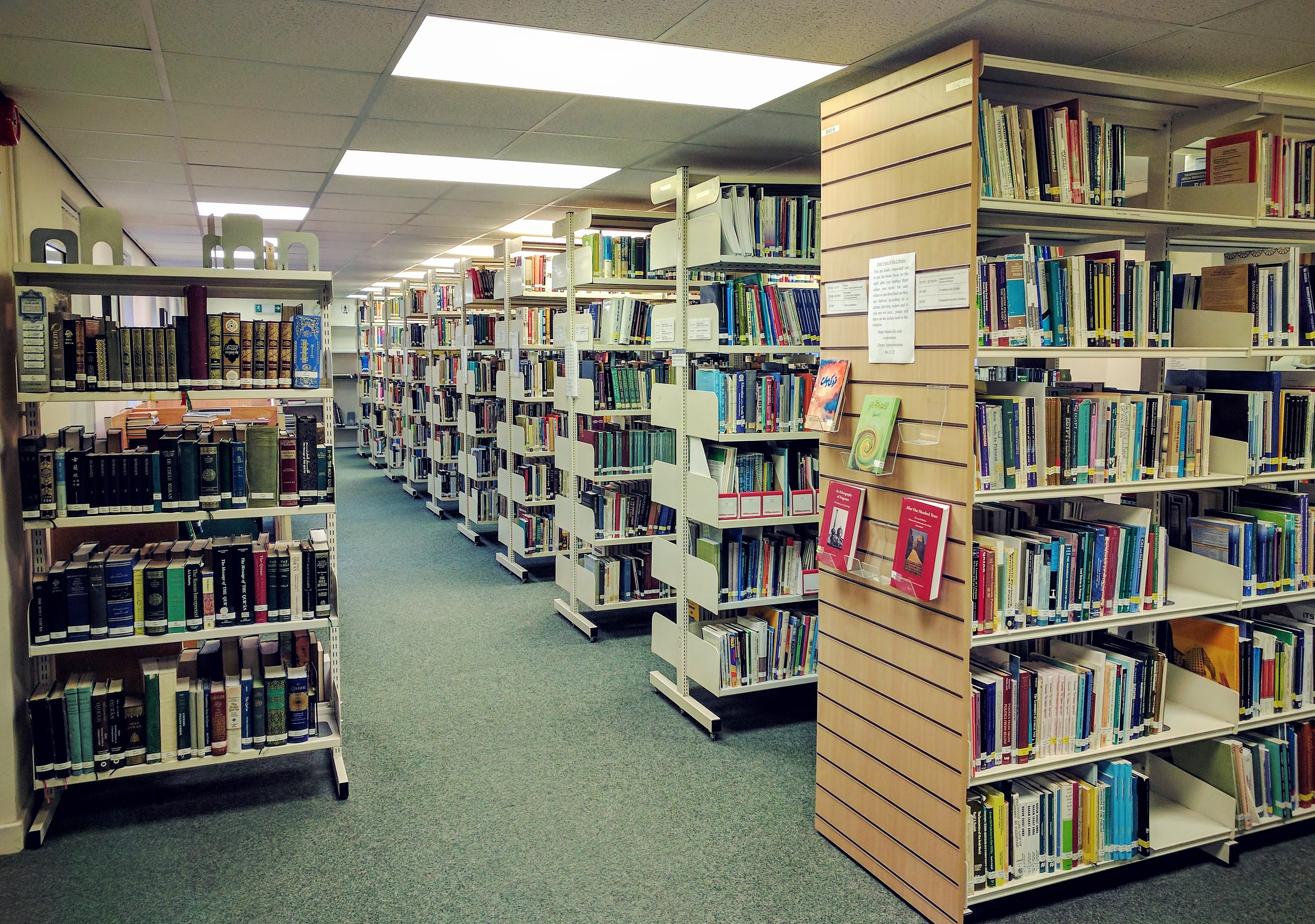
The Markfield Institute Library (ground floor)

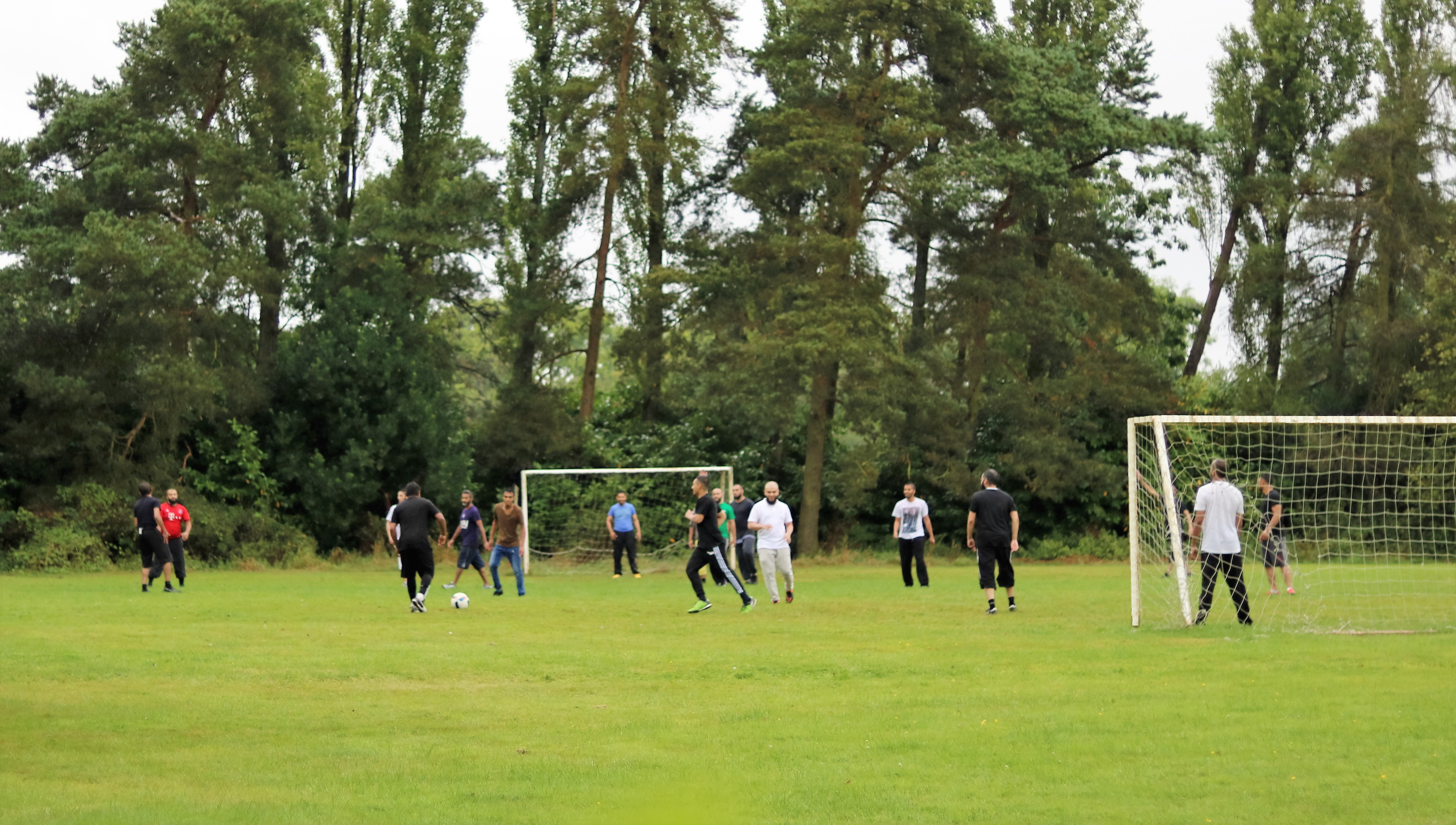
Students playing football at the Markfield Institute of Higher Education

=== The Markfield Institute Library ===
The institute houses one of the largest Islamic libraries in Europe, holding over 40,000 volumes of books and journals. Students of the institute may also use the libraries of the University of Leicester and De Montfort University for reference purposes.

=== On-site accommodation ===
Self-catering accommodation is available on site. Separate buildings serve as accommodation blocks for male and female students.

=== The Markfield Mosque ===
The Markfield Mosque is located on the institute’s campus. Friday sermons are given by both students and scholars.

=== Sports facilities and gym ===
The campus also has sports facilities that may be used to play football, volleyball, badminton, pool and table tennis. A small gym is also available.

== Recognition ==
The institute is accredited by the British Accreditation Council, reviewed by the Quality Assurance Agency for Higher Education, and registered with the Higher Education Funding Council for England. In 2015, the institute was shortlisted for The Muslim News Award for Excellence in Education.

== Bibliography ==
- Lewis, Phillip (1994), "Being Muslim and Being British: The Dynamics of Islamic Reconstruction in Bradford", in Roger Ballard; Marcus Banks (eds.), Desh Pardesh: The South Asian Presence in Britain, C. Hurst & Co. Publishers, pp. 58–87, ISBN 978-1-85065-091-1
- Bowen, Innes (2014), Medina in Birmingham, Najaf in Brent: Inside British Islam, Hurst, ISBN 978-1-84904-529-2
- Vidino, Lorenzo (2021), "Aims and Methods of Europe's Muslim Brotherhood", in Noor Dahri (ed.), The Devils Rebirth: The Terror Triangle of Ikhwan, IRGC and Hezbollah, Vij Books India Pvt Ltd, ISBN 9789390439652
