= Mosques and Imams National Advisory Board =

- Abbreviation: MINAB
- Formation: 27 June 2006
- Type: advisory and facilitatory body
- Location: London
- Region served: United Kingdom
- Official language: English
- Chairman: Maulana Shahid Raza OBE
- Staff: 3
- Volunteers: 20
- Website: www.minab.org.uk

The Mosques and Imams National Advisory Board (MINAB) originated in the United Kingdom on 27 June 2006 with the aim of promoting best practice in British mosques. It is an independent self-regulatory body aspiring to build capacity in mosques, help deliver standards, and ensure mosque personnel have a better understanding of British Muslims' needs so that it can address any concerns more effectively. It works with and represents all Muslim traditions and schools of thought.

Following the launch of the draft constitution in November 2007, there was a further process of consultation with representatives of mosques, Islamic centres, Imam training institutes, leaders, and scholars. The consultation events took place in all the major cities in the UK and this work was undertaken by an interim steering group, composed of representatives from the four founder organisations: Al-Khoei Foundation, British Muslim Forum, Muslim Association of Britain and Muslim Council of Britain.

MINAB now has over six hundred mosques and Islamic institutes as its members. It is a charity registered under the laws of England & Wales with an accountable system of representation.

The MINAB will capacity-build mosques through standards. It has five standards:

1. Members apply principles of good corporate governance
2. Members ensure that services are provided by suitably qualified and or experienced personnel
3. There are systems and processes in place to ensure that there are no impediments to the participation in the activities, including governance, for young people
4. There are systems and processes in place to ensure that there are no impediments to the participation in the activities, including governance, for women
5. Members ensure there are programmes that promote civic responsibility of Muslims in the wider society

The process of self-certification is that the mosques will self-certify whether they fully meet or partially meet each of the above five standards. The MINAB will then randomly select 50% of the mosques that state that they fully meet the standard to assess how the organisation does so. If the assessment process highlights that the organisation does not meet the standard that it has self-certified that it does, the MINAB will then support it through its capacity building programme. The body has been praised by some, like Communities Secretary Hazel Blears. Others have questioned its apparent links with the government. Inayat Bunglawala said: "If MINAB is to stand any chance of gaining legitimacy and making actual progress then it will need to prove that it is free from governmental interference."
