= Khurram Murad =

Pakistani writer and scholar (1932–1996)

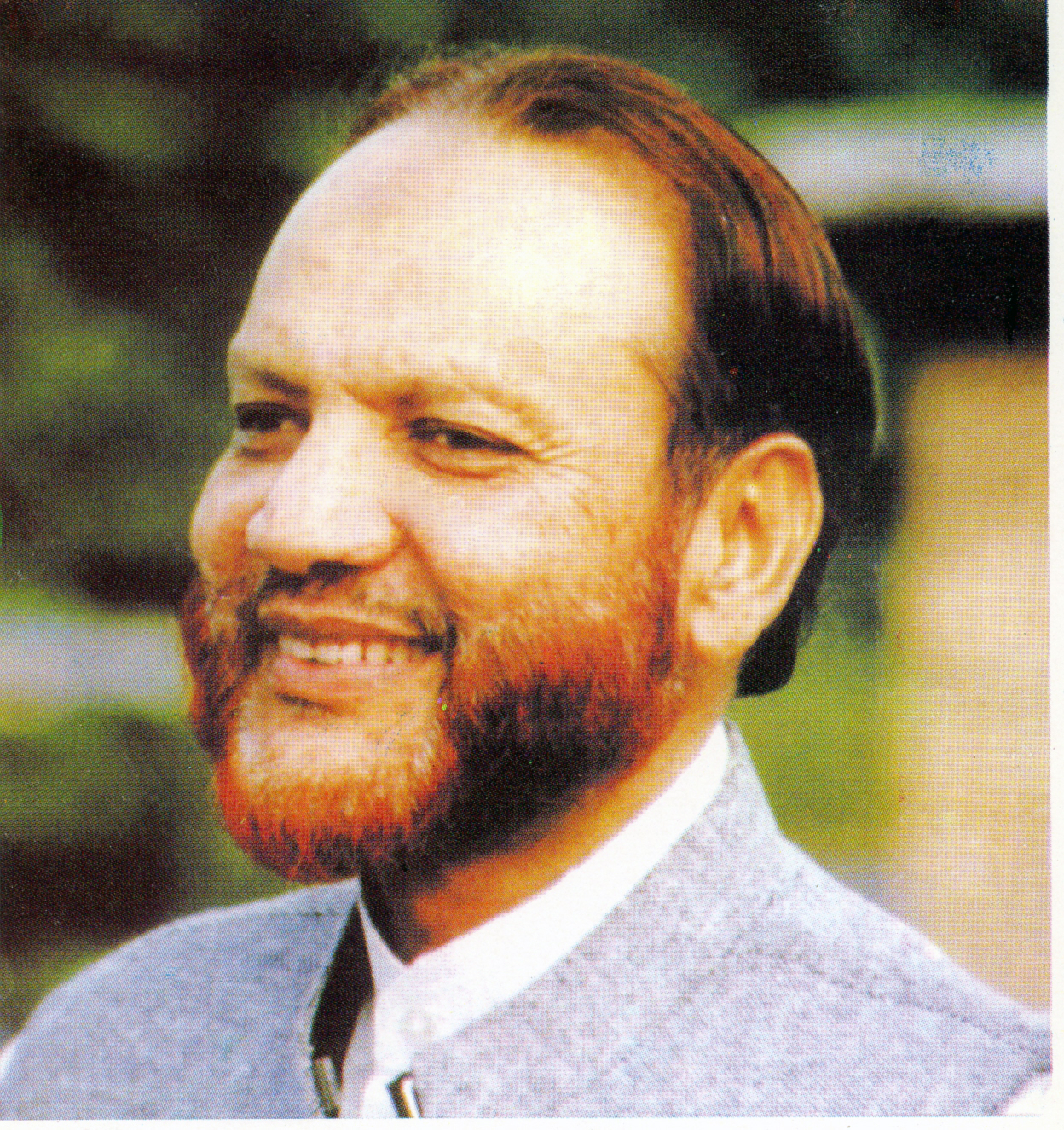
- Born: 3 November 1932; Bhopal, India
- Died: 19 December 1996; Leicester, United Kingdom
- Education: University of Minnesota
- Occupations: Islamic scholar, author, politician, civil engineer
- Organization(s): Jamaat-e-Islami Pakistan; Islami Jamiat-e-Talaba; The Islamic Foundation; Muslim World Book Review

Khurram Murad (3 November 1932 – 19 December 1996) was a Pakistani scholar of Islam.

== Early life and education ==
Murad was born on 3 November 1932, in Bhopal, a Muslim princely state in Central India. His lineage came from Muzzafar Nagar and Saharanpur. He enrolled in the Bhopal-based Hameediyah College in 1947 after completing his matriculation. His family migrated to Pakistan in 1948. After settling in Karachi, Khurram enrolled in the D.J. Science College. After finishing his intermediate education, he attended the University of Karachi's Bachelor of Civil Engineering program, which he graduated from in 1952. In 1958, he earned his master's degree from the University of Minnesota in the US. After receiving his degree, he also taught at the university for a brief period before leaving for Pakistan.

== Academic and professional career ==
He worked as a lecturer in NED Engineering College from 1955 to 1957. As a notable engineer of the country, he rendered his services in East Pakistan (later Bangladesh) as chief engineer and resident director of the then famous consultancy firm; Associate and Consulting Engineers (ACE). He remained in India as a prisoner of war for two and a half years after the fall of East Pakistan in 1971. During his employment, he in addition to Pakistan provided his services to the major construction projects in Iran and Saudi Arabia. In this regard, he took part in the expansion project of Makkah.

== Political career and religious activism ==
After moving from Saudi Arabia to the United Kingdom, he served as the Director-General of The Islamic Foundation, a well-known scientific and research institution from 1977 to 1987.

Murad served as Naib Amir (Vice-President) of the Jamaat-e-Islami Pakistan and Amir (President) in Dhaka city of then East Pakistan, a Trustee and a former Director General of the Islamic Foundation in Leicester, UK, and editor of Tarjumanal Qur'an, Lahore, Pakistan (a journal founded by the Islamic scholar, Abul Ala Maududi in 1932), and the quarterly Muslim World Book Review, UK.

== Publications ==
His works include:

- Way to the Quran (and an online website)
- Key to al-Baqarah
- The Quranic Treasures
- Islam – The Easy Way
- Who is Muhammad?
- Gifts from Muhammad
- Shariah: The Way to Justice
- Shari'ah: The Way to God
- Interpersonal Relations
- In the Early Hours: Reflections on Spiritual and Self-Development
- Sacrifice the making of a Muslim
- Dawah among Non-Muslims in the West
- Islam & Terrorism
- The Islamic Movement: Dynamics of Values Power and Change
- Islamic Movement in the West: Reflections on Some Issues
- Dying & Living for Allah
- Treasures of the Qur'an

Some of his booklets in Urdu are:

- Zikr-e-Ilahi ("Remembrance of God")
- Rabb se Mulaaqaat ("Meeting with the Lord")
- Dawat kai Nishan-e-Raah
- Imaanat Daary ("Honesty")
- Allah se Muhabbat ("Loving Allah")
- Hasad aur Bughz ("Jealousy & Envy")
- Rizq-e-halal ("Lawful Sustenance")
- Niyyat aur Amal ("Intention & Action")
- Hubb-e-Dunya ("Love of the World")
- Dil ki zindagi ("Life of the Heart")
- Ghalatiyon to Maaf Karna ("Forgiving Mistakes")
- Haqeeqat-e-Zuhd ("Reality of Piety")
- Urooj ka Raasta ("The Way to Elevation")
