= Dilwar Hussain =

British consultant working on social policy, Muslim identity (born 1970)

- Born: 25 December 1970 (age 55)
- Education: King's College London, University of Wales, Lampeter
- Occupations: Independent Consultant, Lecturer
- Known for: Work on social policy, Muslim identity, Islamic reform
- Title: MBE
- Awards: Member of the Order of the British Empire (MBE) in the 2021 Birthday Honours for services to interfaith social cohesion

Dilwar Hussain MBE (born 25 December 1970) is an independent British consultant working on social policy, Muslim identity and Islamic reform in the modern world. He formerly taught MA courses on Islam and Muslims at the Markfield Institute of Higher Education.

== Biography ==
Hussain, a British Bangladeshi, studied at King's College London, graduating in 1993. He completed a Master of Philosophy in religious studies from the University of Wales, Lampeter in 1999.

Dilwar is founding Chair of New Horizons in British Islam, a charity that works on Muslim identity, integration, and reform; Research Fellow at the Centre for Trust, Peace and Social Relations, University of Coventry and Lecturer at the University of Leicester.

He is Vice-Chair of the Holocaust Memorial Day Trust and a Trustee of the Faith and Belief Forum and the Islamic Society of Britain, where he was President (2011–2013).

He was (2013 - 2016) a member of the Community, Voluntary and Local services Honours Committee, which nominates people for the Queen's Birthday and New Year's Honours. He was himself appointed Member of the Order of the British Empire (MBE) in the 2021 Birthday Honours for services to interfaith social cohesion.

== Selected publications ==
- "Belonging Without Believing: Religion, Atheism, and Islam today", in: A. Carroll and R. Norman, (2017) Religion and Atheism: Beyond the Divide, Routledge, Oxon, UK.
- Contextualising Islam in Europe and North America: Challenges and Opportunities, with Peter Mandaville, Brookings, US, 2015.
- ‘[Muslims in] The UK’ in J.S. Nielsen et al. (eds.) Yearbook of Muslims in Europe Vol 6, Brill, Leiden, 2014.
- Somalis in Leicester (with research team), Open Society Foundation, 2014.
- ‘Can Muslims Think Universally? Human Rights as a Challenge for Reform’, Amos International Journal (July 2013).
- 'Social Policy, Cultural Integration, and Faith: A Muslim Perspective’, Journal of Social Policy and Society (October 2012 Special Issue).
- ‘How did the Muslim Community Come to be Where it is Today?’ in: Tony Bayfield, Alan Race and Ataullah Siddiqui (Eds) (2012) Beyond the Dysfunctional Family: Jews, Christians and Muslims in Dialogue With Each Other and With Britain.
- Muslims in Leicester (with research team), Open Society Institute, 2010.
- "Europe, Muslims in" entry in Oxford Encyclopedia of Islam, Oxford University Press, 2009.
- "Islam" in Zaki Cooper and Guy Lodge (eds.), Faith in the Nation: religion, identity and the public realm in Britain today, IPPR, December 2008.
- Leading the preventing violent extremism agenda: a role made for councilors. (Contributed to guidance booklet with research team), Local Government Association, 2008.
- "Islamophobia: Old Wine in New Bottles?", in Islamophobia and the Challenges of Pluralism in the 21st Century, ACMCU Occasional Papers, August 2008.
- "Faith and Solidarity" in Nick Johnson (ed.), Citizenship, Cohesion and Solidarity, The Smith Institute, June 2008.
- "British Muslims in the anti-terror age" in Global Dialogue, Vol. 9, No. 3-4, Summer / Autumn 2007.
- Faith as Social Capital – Connecting or Dividing? Report of a Joseph-Rowntree Foundation research project with Rob Furbey, et al., March 2006.
- Chapter on ‘Can Islam Make us British?’ in Madeleine Bunting (ed.) Islam, Race and Being British, Guardian Publications, 2005.
- Report on Human Rights and Muslims in the EU, jointly with Professor Jocelyne Cesari and Alexandre Caeiro, the European Commission, 2005.
- Report on Mapping Jewish-Muslim Dialogue in the UK sponsored by the Stone-Ashdown Foundation, with Dr. Keith Kahn-Harris et al., July 2005.
- Chapter on ‘British Muslim Identity post 9/11’, in Ron Geaves et al., Islam and the West Post 11 September, Ashgate, 2004.
- Article on ‘Muslim Political Participation in Britain and the ‘Europeanisation’ of Fiqh’ in Die Welt des Islam, Brill, Leiden, Winter 2004.
- British Muslims between Assimilation and Segregation, co-authored book, The Islamic Foundation, 2004.
- British Muslims: Loyalty and Belonging, co-edited book, The Islamic Foundation, Leicester, 2003.
- Chapter on ‘The Holy Grail of Muslims in Western Europe: Representation and Relationship with the State’, in Esposito and Burgat (eds.), Modernizing Islam: Religion in the Public Sphere in Europe and the Middle East. Hurst & Co., London, 2003.

== See also ==
- British Bangladeshis
- List of British Bangladeshis
