= Inayat Bunglawala =

British writer

Inayat Bunglawala was media secretary of the Muslim Council of Britain until 2010.

He joined The Young Muslims UK in 1987. He is also a co-presenter of the weekly 'Politics and Media Show' on the Islam Channel (SKY 813). In October 2009 he registered the domain name Muslims4UK.org.uk, thus launching a group which is described as "set up to celebrate the UK's democratic traditions and promote active Muslim engagement in our society".

== Work ==
Some of Bunglawala's views as media secretary for the Muslim Council of Britain were quoted in the press. He has discussed matters of religion as well as politics.

=== Tackling extremism together ===
Despite accusations of anti-Semitism, Bunglawala was selected as one of seven "conveners" of a Home Office task force with responsibilities for tackling extremism among young Muslims. He rejects these accusations as a "traditional Zionist tactic" aimed to "silence critics of Israel", as he is an outspoken defender of what he considers to be Israeli oppression of Palestinians. Home Secretary Charles Clarke said in response: "I am grateful to the working groups for drawing up such constructive ideas. We look forward to continuing the dialogue with Muslim communities and supporting the work that they are undertaking.”

=== Political views ===
Bunglawala has commented that many Muslims believed the UK's involvement in wars against Afghanistan and Iraq were a "key contributory factor in the radicalisation" of some young Muslims, but added: "extremists often paint a very unfair picture of the West. We all benefit from freedoms and opportunities here that are not exactly plentiful in many Muslim countries."

He has been a critic of US foreign policy, saying: "The US government needs to demonstrate that it is prepared to be more even-handed in its relations with Muslims and Muslim countries." Regarding the torture of Iraqis at Abu Ghraib by US soldiers, he said: "I think this type of activity by U.S. forces will only further anger the Muslim population of Iraq."

=== Libel Wins ===
In July 2008, the Daily Express newspaper published an apology to Bunglawala for publishing false allegations against him saying that they had been wrong to "allege that Mr Bunglawala was a fanatical extremist who was inciting or would condone a terrorist attack on Prince Harry. There was absolutely no truth in these allegations. Mr Bunglawala did not, and would not, condone any attack on Prince Harry; on the contrary, he consistently made clear to the media that he wanted to see the Prince and his colleagues brought home, out of harm’s way. We apologise unreservedly to Mr Bunglawala for the distress and embarrassment we have caused him." The Daily Express agreed to pay all of Bunglawala's legal costs and also paid him £45000 in damages.

In July 2009, the Mail on Sunday newspaper published an apology to Bunglawala for publishing false allegations against him saying that "On March 15 we suggested that Inayat Bunglawala’s stabbing an intruder at his home questioned his suitability as a Government adviser on terrorism. In fact Mr Bunglawala acted entirely in self-defence and no charges were brought against him. Also, Mr Bunglawala does not support Al Qaeda or Abu Qatada as the article may have suggested. We apologise to Mr Bunglawala for the distress caused and have agreed to pay him damages." The BBC news website published a story about the false allegations against Bunglawala and the Mail on Sunday's subsequent apology and its agreement to pay Bunglawala's legal costs and also substantial damages.

=== IPSO Rulings Against Newspapers ===
In January 2021, Bunglawala won an IPSO ruling against Express.co.uk for publishing an inaccurate story alleging "that in the last ten months alone [Boko Haram] have invaded and permanently occupied 350 Igbo villages and communities." IPSO upheld Bunglawala's complaint and found that Express.co.uk had "failed to take care over accuracy and its proposed clarification had been inadequate. In such circumstances, the Committee decided that the appropriate remedy was the publication of a correction. This should appear under the headline of the online article. The correction should acknowledge that the previous version of the article was inaccurate; that the InterSociety report did not identify Boko Haram as the group responsible for the invasion and the occupation of the Igbo villages referred to and then identify the specific group(s) that were. The wording of this correction should state that it was published following an upheld ruling by the Independent Press Standards Organisation. The full word and position of this correction should be agreed with IPSO in advance."

In April 2023, Bunglawala won an IPSO ruling against the Jewish Chronicle for publishing an inaccurate article alleging that "the Islamic Republic [of Iran] has repeatedly vowed to wipe Israel and Jews off the face of the Earth." Bunglawala had argued that "whilst he was aware of statements from Iran's political leaders that looked forward to the dismantling of Israel, he did not think that there were statements from Iranian political leaders that have "repeatedly vowed to wipe...Jews off the face of the earth"." IPSO upheld Bunglawala's complaint against the Jewish Chronicle and ordered it to publish a correction.

=== Appearance at the Leveson Inquiry ===
In January 2012, Bunglawala submitted evidence to the Leveson Inquiry on press standards and was also invited to give in person evidence to the Inquiry about the press failings.

== Controversies ==
He opposed the banning of Hizb ut-Tahrir under the UK anti-terror laws. Bunglawala considers Ahmed Yassin to be an important Islamic scholar and he opposes the Muslim Association of Britain's removal from the Muslim Council.

In January 1993, Bunglawala wrote a letter to Private Eye, a satirical magazine, in which he called Omar Abdel-Rahman "courageous". After Rahman's arrest on charges of masterminding the bombing of the World Trade Center in New York in July that year, Bunglawala guessed that it was only because of his "calling on Muslims to fulfil their duty to Allah and to fight against oppression and oppressors everywhere". Five months before the September 11, 2001 attacks, Bunglawala also circulated writings of Osama bin Laden, whom he called a "freedom fighter", to hundreds of Muslims in Britain.
