= Islamic Society of Britain =

Islamic organization based in London, England, United Kingdom

- Abbreviation: ISB
- Formation: 1990; 36 years ago
- Headquarters: London, England, United Kingdom
- Website: Official website

The Islamic Society of Britain (ISB) was set up in 1990 for British Muslims to promote Islamic values. Its youth wing is The Young Muslims UK (YMUK).

== Background ==
The ISB's first president was Zahid Parvez. On 16 November 2013 Sughra Ahmed was elected president of ISB, the first female to hold that post. According to Islamic Organizations in Europe and the USA, the society caters to non-Arab Sunni Muslims, born and brought up in Britain. Anti-Islamist author, Ed Husain, who participated in an ISB "Usrah" religious study group in the 1990s, describes the society as "proudly British", predominately middle class and professional. Julie Siddiqi was the executive director of the Islamic Society of Britain from 2010 to 2014.

According to the book The Muslim Brothers in Europe: Roots and Discourse, the society is "based on a chaotic partnership" between members or former members of the Muslim Brotherhood and former members of Jamaat-e-Islami. R. Geaves describes ISB as one of several movements that "have their ideological roots in the activism of Sayyid Qutb and Maulana Mawdudi", but whose "radical voice that called for an Islamic state has been toned down to a gradualist approach and the emergence of `British Islam`."

According to Husain, the society broke with Jamaat-e-Islami, and has taken a "vehement stand" against the global, neo-caliphate Islamist group Hizb ut-Tahrir.

In 1997, some supporters of the Muslim Brotherhood "broke off" from ISB to form the Muslim Association of Britain, and Husain writes, some bitterness remains between the two groups. According to Anshuman A. Mondal, the society "has been one of a large number" of British Muslim "organizations, individuals and processes ... that have been contesting older Islamist ideas, to varying degrees.".

== Methods of working ==
The Islamic Society of Britain directs its work into the following areas:

Internally:

- Open and dynamic organisation
- Personal development of members- in outlook, Understanding, skills and character
- Facilitating spiritual progress of members

And externally:

- Promoting a deep awareness of Islam
- Social concern and engagement

== Membership and structure ==
The Islamic Society of Britain is a nationwide organisation that has local branches in addition to a national guiding body, the 'Shura' - consisting of representatives from all the major sections of the organisation. The president and Shura are elected every two years by the membership. Annual Members Meetings provide a formal setting for members to feedback to the leadership, exchange views and opinions and help shape the organisation (although informally this is occurring all the time).

ISB is an organic body of Muslims with no hierarchical structure other than individual participation. Membership is open to all Muslims irrespective of gender, age or background.

== Activities ==
The activities of ISB are held at local, regional and national levels. They encompass a range of events, which contribute to fulfilling ISB's aims and vision. These include:

- Islam Awareness Week

Launched in 1994 by ISB, Islam Awareness Week aims to combat stereotypes and misconceptions surrounding Islam and Muslims. Most notably, the campaign was featured on the social media platform Snapchat with a filter that was captioned ‘Young, Muslim and British’ in March 2017. The filter allowed users of the platform to share messages about the role Islam plays in their lives.

- Radio broadcasting
- Exhibitions
- Conferences
- Seminars
- Weekend spiritual development retreats
- Regional and national camps
- Lecture programs
- Study circles
- Dinners and social gatherings
- Jumu`ah (Friday prayer) provision at schools
- Sports tournaments

ISB also produces:

- Information leaflets
- Booklets
- Magazines
- Audio and video material

They run many national projects including:

- The Young Muslims UK
- Islamic Scouts of Britain
- Living Islam
- Islam Awareness Week
- Knowledgeseekers
- Weekend4Women
- Nasheed Extravaganza

The Islamic Society of Britain was an affiliate body of the Muslim Council of Britain until February 2016, when it disaffiliated.

=== Controversies ===
==== Screening of The Message ====
In 2015, on behalf of the ISB, The Grosvenor, a cinema in Glasgow, Scotland, was due to screen The Message, an Oscar-nominated film about the life of the prophet Muhammad. The screening was met with opposition by some groups, claiming that the film was disrespectful and offensive to Muslims, and following threats the screening was cancelled. In response to the cancellation, the ISB said:

“These protestors demonstrate the worst elements of our community, as they are imposing their beliefs on others.”

They also expressed “deep regret” that a decision had been made based on what it viewed as a “small number of objections.”

==== Poppy hijabs ====
Joining Remembrance traditions to remember those fallen in war, the ISB launched a version of the customary poppy in the form of a ‘poppy hijab’, a headscarf designed with printed poppies for Muslim women as a way for them to support the campaign. The hijab was created in collaboration with think-tank, British Future and also aimed to remember the Muslim soldiers who had also fought in World War I. The president of ISB, Sughra Ahmed said:

“It’s a way for ordinary Muslim citizens to take some attention away from extremists who seem to grab the headlines. This symbol of quiet remembrance is the face of everyday British Islam – not the angry minority who spout hatred and offend everyone.”

The move was met with opposition by some British Muslims who viewed it as a ‘test’ for British Muslims who had to prove their loyalty to Britain and to show that they were not ‘extremists’.

Further objections also included that the hijab, which many treat as a sign of religiosity and devotion to God, should not be used as a political tool.
