= Markfield =

Village in Leicestershire, England

Coordinates: 52.687802°N 1.277510°W

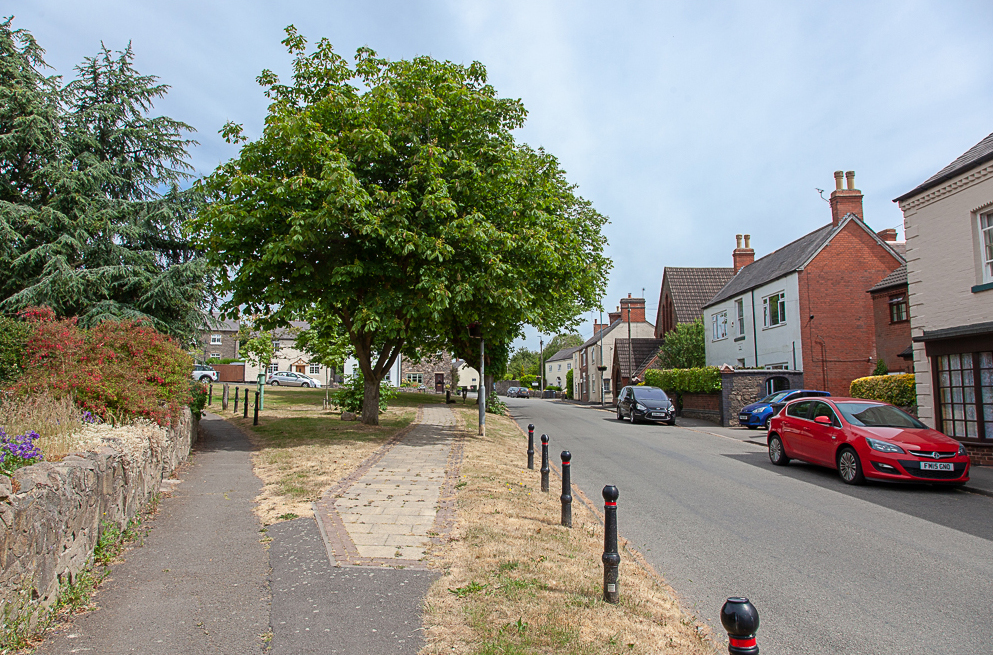
- Main Street, Markfield

- Location within Leicestershire
- Population: 5,681
- OS grid reference: SK488103
- Civil parish: Markfield
- District: Hinckley and Bosworth
- Shire county: Leicestershire
- Region: East Midlands
- Country: England
- Sovereign state: United Kingdom
- Post town: MARKFIELD
- Postcode district: LE67
- Dialling code: 01530
- Police: Leicestershire
- Fire: Leicestershire
- Ambulance: East Midlands
- UK Parliament: Mid Leicestershire

Markfield is a large village in both the National Forest and Charnwood Forest, in the Hinckley and Bosworth district of Leicestershire, England. The settlement dates back to at least the time of the Norman conquest and is mentioned in the Domesday Book under the name Merchenefeld. A variant of this is still used as the name for the village primary school, Mercenfeld. It is to the south-east of Junction 22 of the M1, and to the south of the A50. The highest point in Markfield is shown on OS sheet 129 as 222 metres above sea level, making it one of the highest villages in Leicestershire. Nearby places are Newtown Linford, Groby, Field Head, and Stanton under Bardon. In the 1841 census its population was recorded at 1,203. In the 2011 census the parish had a population of 5,681. In 2012 Hinckley & Bosworth Borough Council published an overview of the Markfield conservation area.

== History ==
=== Domesday Book ===
Markfield is shown in the Domesday Book as having two small households. Ulf is shown as the lord of Markfield, Groby, Blaby and Ratby in the hundred of Guthlaxton in Leicestershire in 1066. By 1086, the value had increased fivefold to £0.50 and the lord was Hugh of Grandmesnil who was also associated with the hundreds of Goscote, Guthlaxton and Gartree in Leicestershire.

=== John Wesley ===
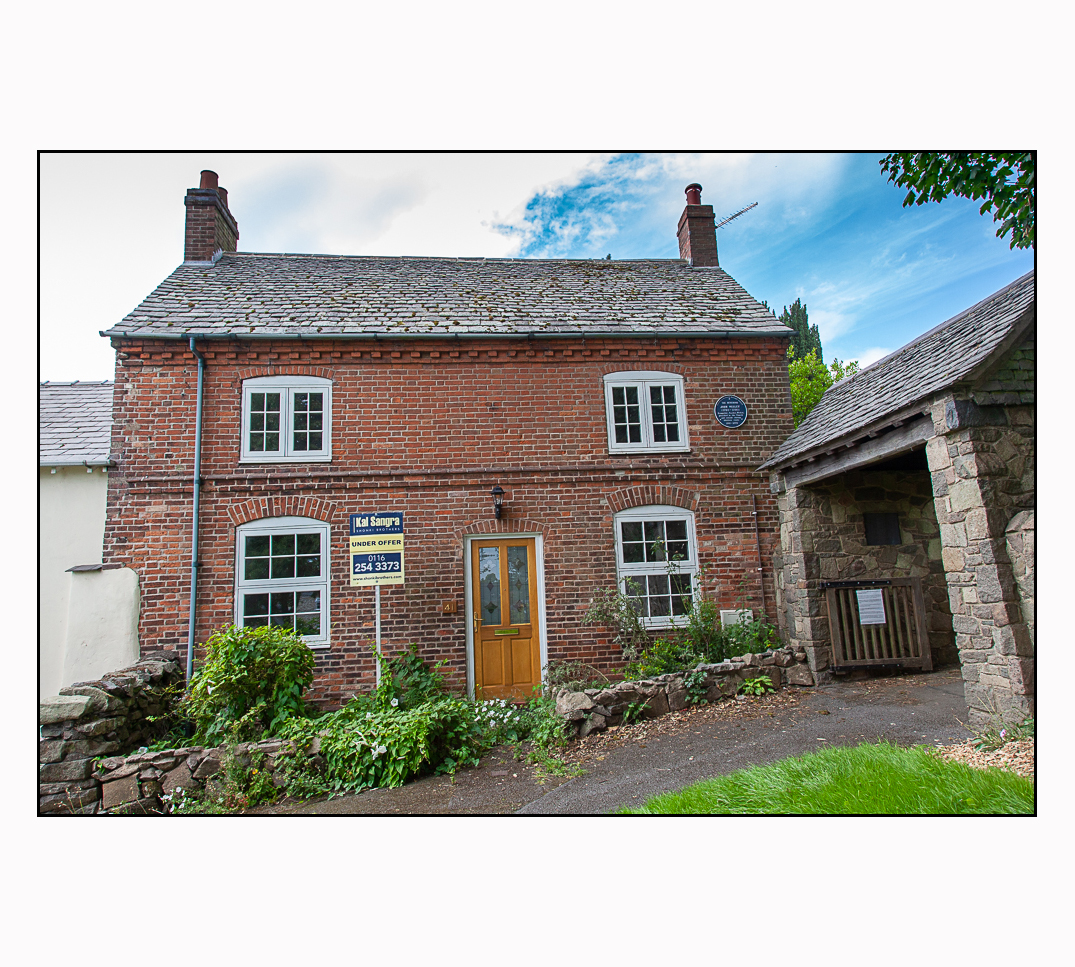

Markfield has close links with the Methodist movement and according to a blue plaque on the church, its founder John Wesley paid 13 visits. He was allowed to preach in the parish church, as he was friendly with the rector, but crowds became so large he would often preach on the village green. The parish church of St Michael and all Angels is a grade II listed building. There are two other churches, Holy Trinity Methodist chapel and the Congregational church but the original Methodist chapel (temperance hall) is no longer used.

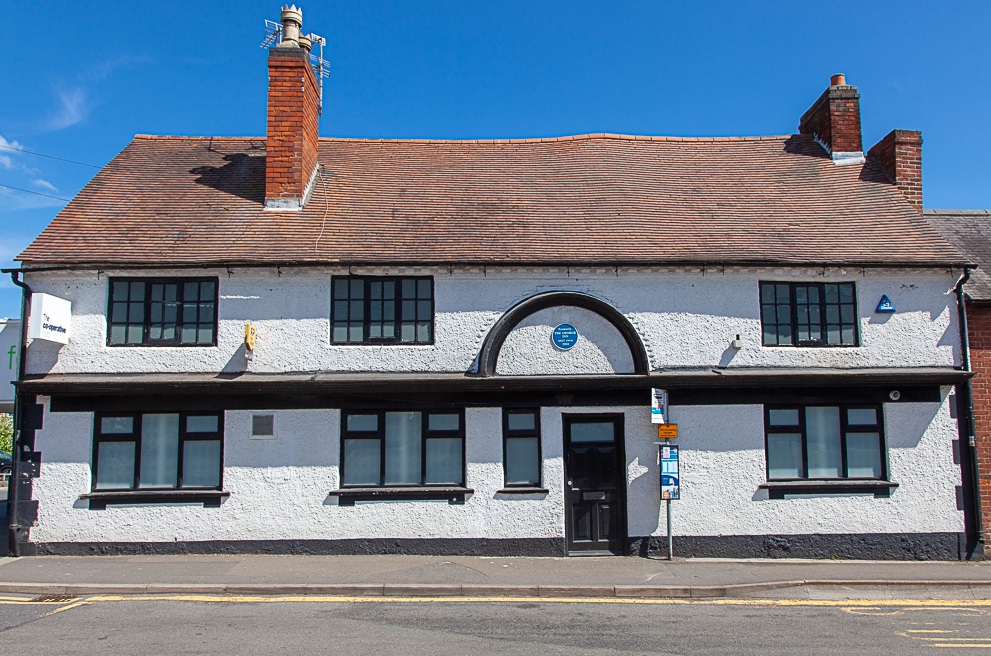

== Worship ==
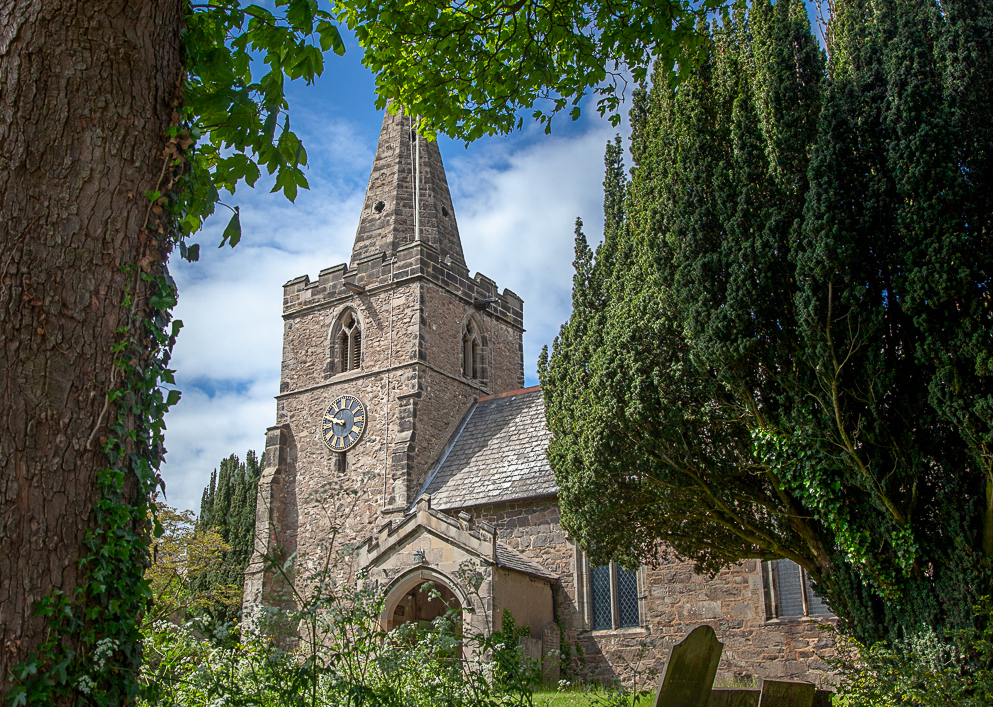

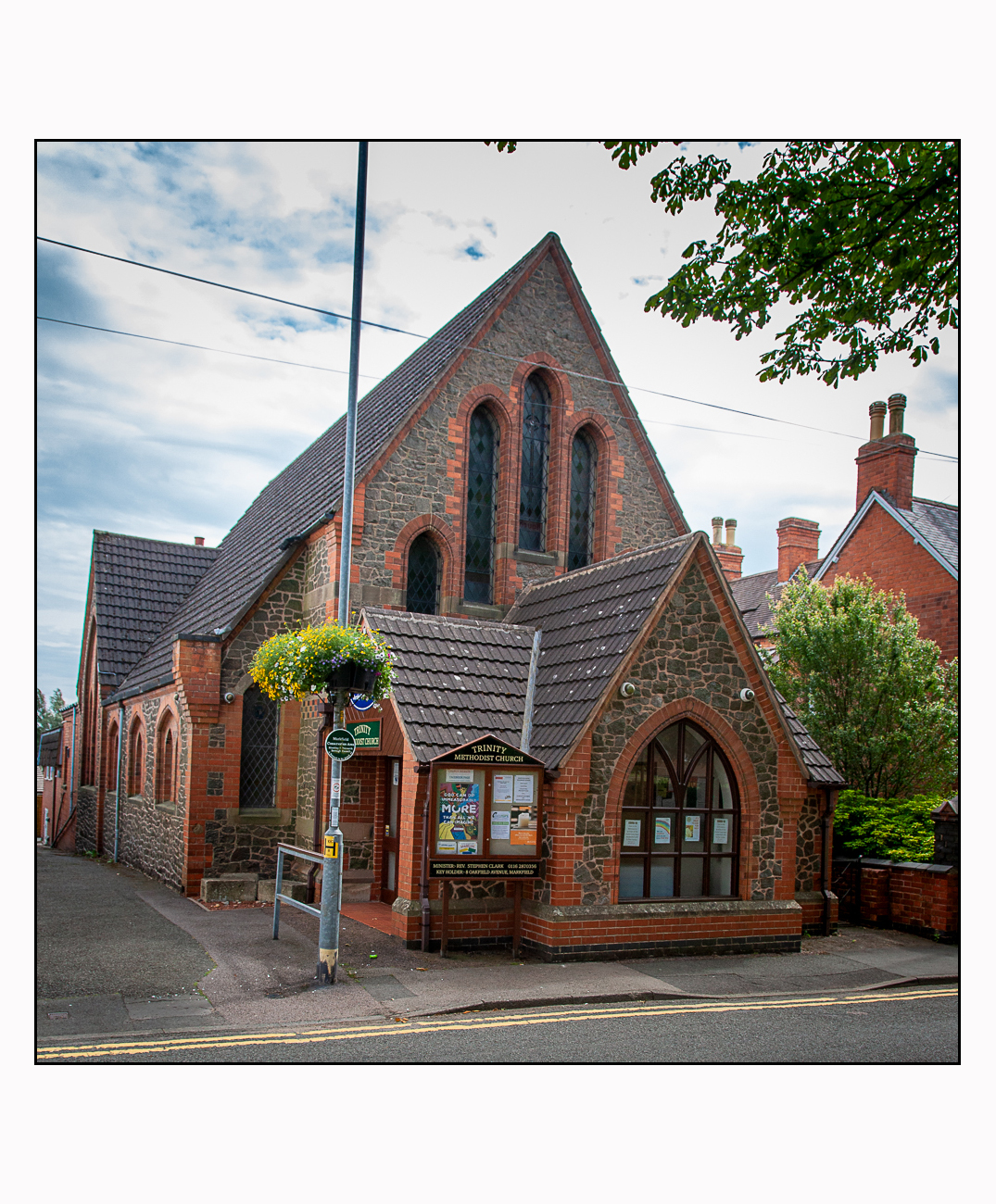

== Education ==
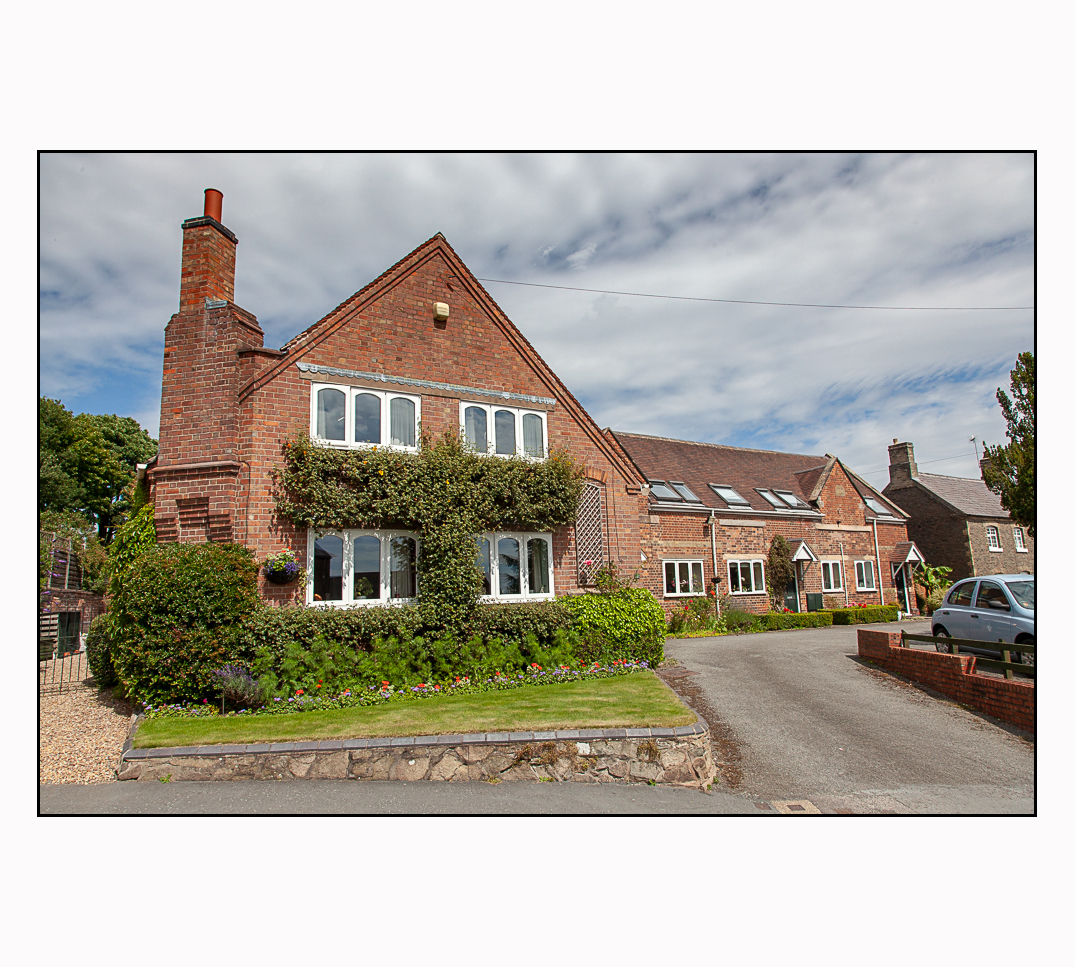
The National School, Markfield

== Facilities ==
The village benefits greatly from being surrounded by easily accessible countryside. There are a variety of public footpaths radiating out from the village – including the "Leicestershire Round", which passes along Main Street. To the north-western side of the village lies the Hill Hole Nature Reserve. Hill Hole is the highest point within the village and from the top of this quarried granite outcrop there are extensive views across the Midland Plain (43 miles to the Clent Hills), southwards to the Cotswolds and eastwards towards the Leicestershire/Lincolnshire boundary. Almost adjoining Hill Hole is the Altar Stones and Blacksmith's Field nature reserve.

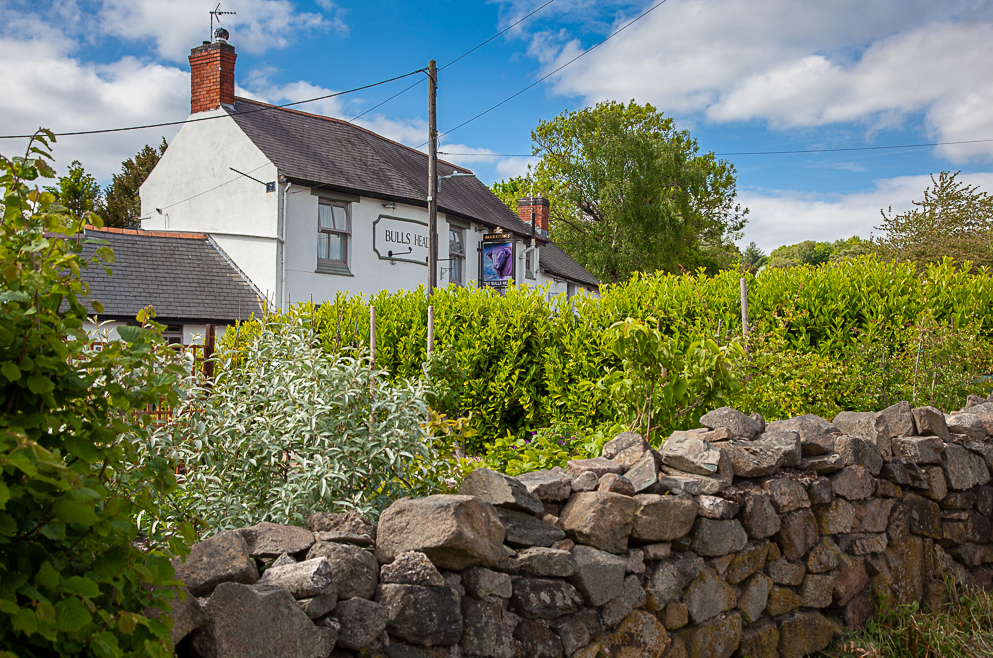

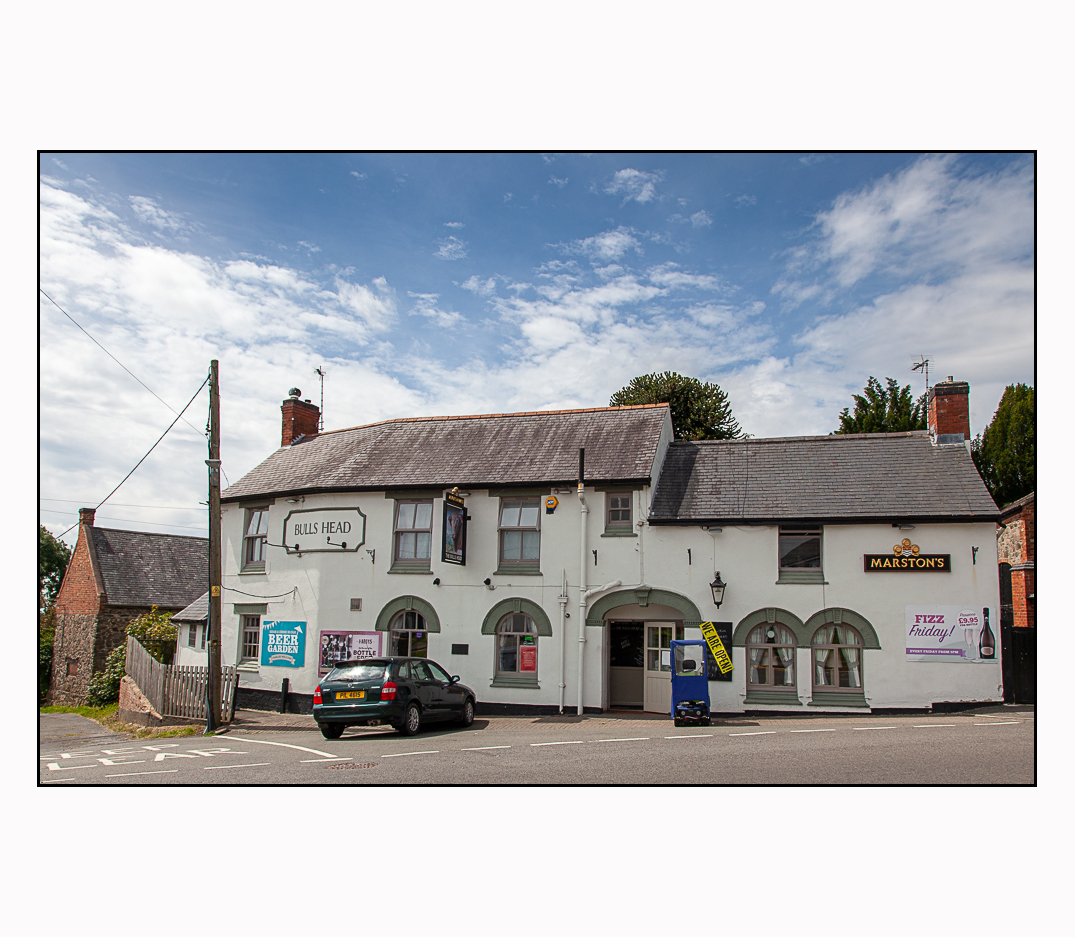

Markfield has two public houses, the Queens Head and the Bulls Head. The Coach and Horses, whilst within Markfield parish, is in the village of Field Head. Markfield has Chinese, Indian and Turkish takeaways, a fish and chip shop, a newsagent, an independent shop selling organic produce, a Co-Op supermarket, a financial advisory office, a GP surgery, a chemist, a Londis supermarket, a post office, a library, a leisure centre and a cafe. There are also several hair-dressing salons and a light industrial estate. The former public house known as the Red Lion has reopened as an Indian restaurant. The George public house as shown in the photograph was previously named 'The Boot'. The village has a well-funded and run Community Centre, built in 1985, which has replaced the old Markfield Memorial Miners Institute as the main community building in the village. There is a Travelodge hotel located on the A50.

Markfield's copious amount of greenery means the village also has a natural burial ground located off Markfield Lane, north of Thornton Reservoir.

== Industry ==
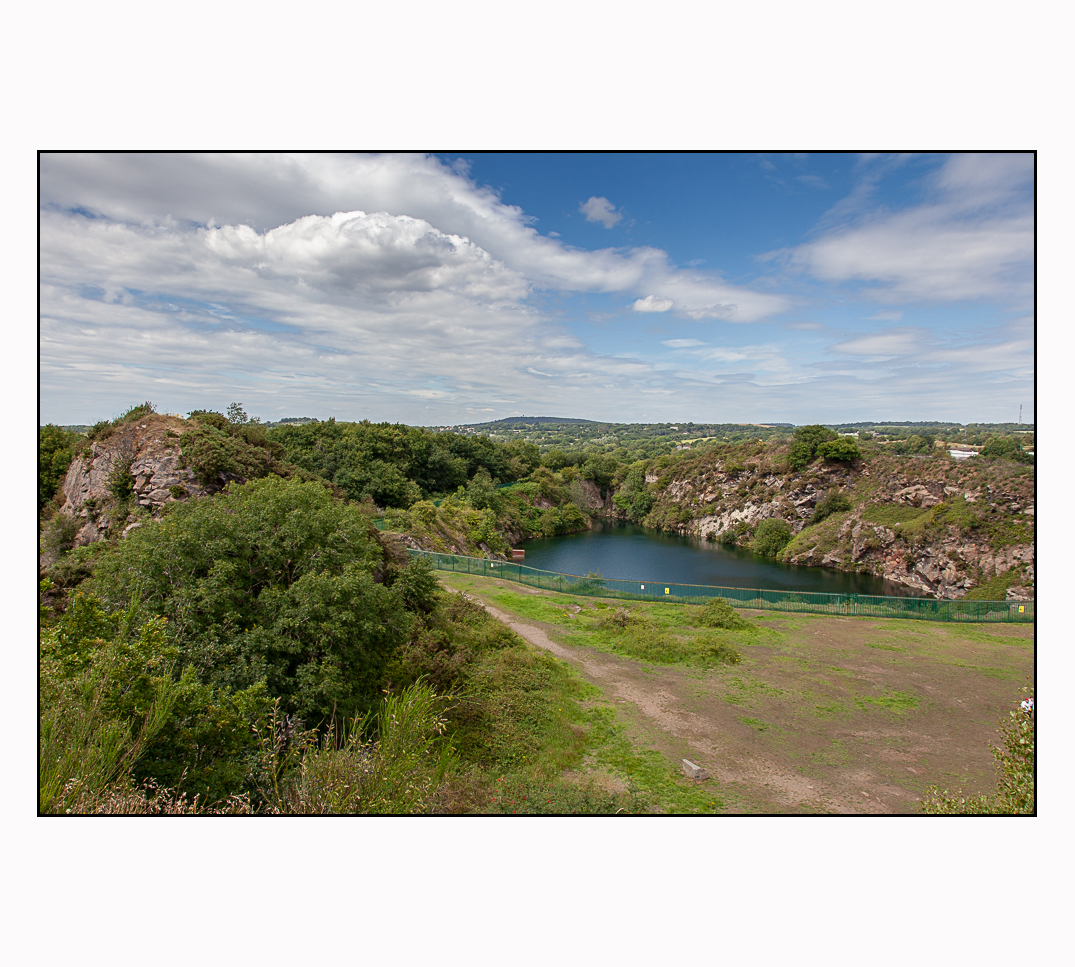

Markfield has a long association with the quarrying industry and has a particular type of granite, microdiorite named after it. The granite stone (microdiorite) 'Markfieldite' is a very hard granite found in the local area and used in roadstone and railway construction. The former headquarters of Aggregate Industries (now under the Holcim company) was in Markfield and in the last few years a major expansion of the Bardon Hill Quarry into the parish of Markfield has begun creating a large extension which will expand the life of Bardon for another 40 years.

== Geology ==
Markfield rests on Precambrian (c.600 Ma) plutonic and volcaniclastic/sedimentary rocks, mostly overlain unconformably by Triassic (c.230-245 Ma) mudstones and siltstones. The plutonic rock is a diorite once named Markfieldite after the village. It varies from microdiorite, granophyric diorite to syenite and is part of the South Charnwood Diorites. It has a distinctive mottled pink-grey texture. The rock consists mainly of feldspars altered to sericite, some showing relict twinning. They are interspersed with dark areas which are aggregates of mafic minerals, mainly secondary amphiboles and chlorite. Granophyric intergrowths of quartz and K-feldspar are also visible.

== Sport ==
The Markfield Greyhound and Whippet Track was opened for greyhound racing on 3 January 1931 by the Old Coach & Horses Inn on Leicester Road. The racing was independent (not affiliated to the sports governing body the National Greyhound Racing Club) and was known as a flapping track, which was the nickname given to independent tracks. Distances were 330 and 500 yards but the track only survived one year.

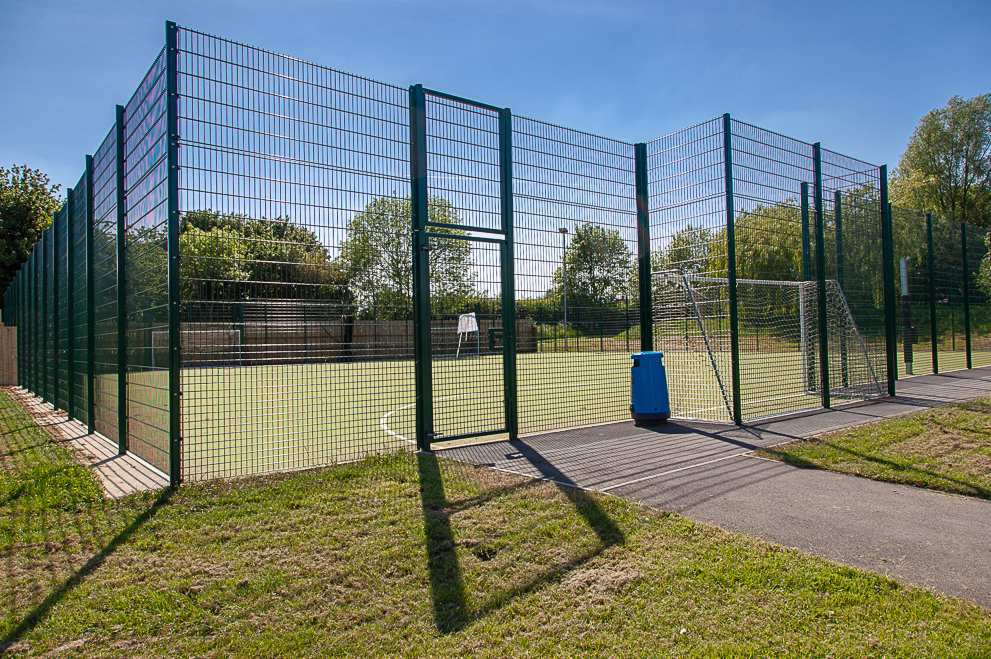

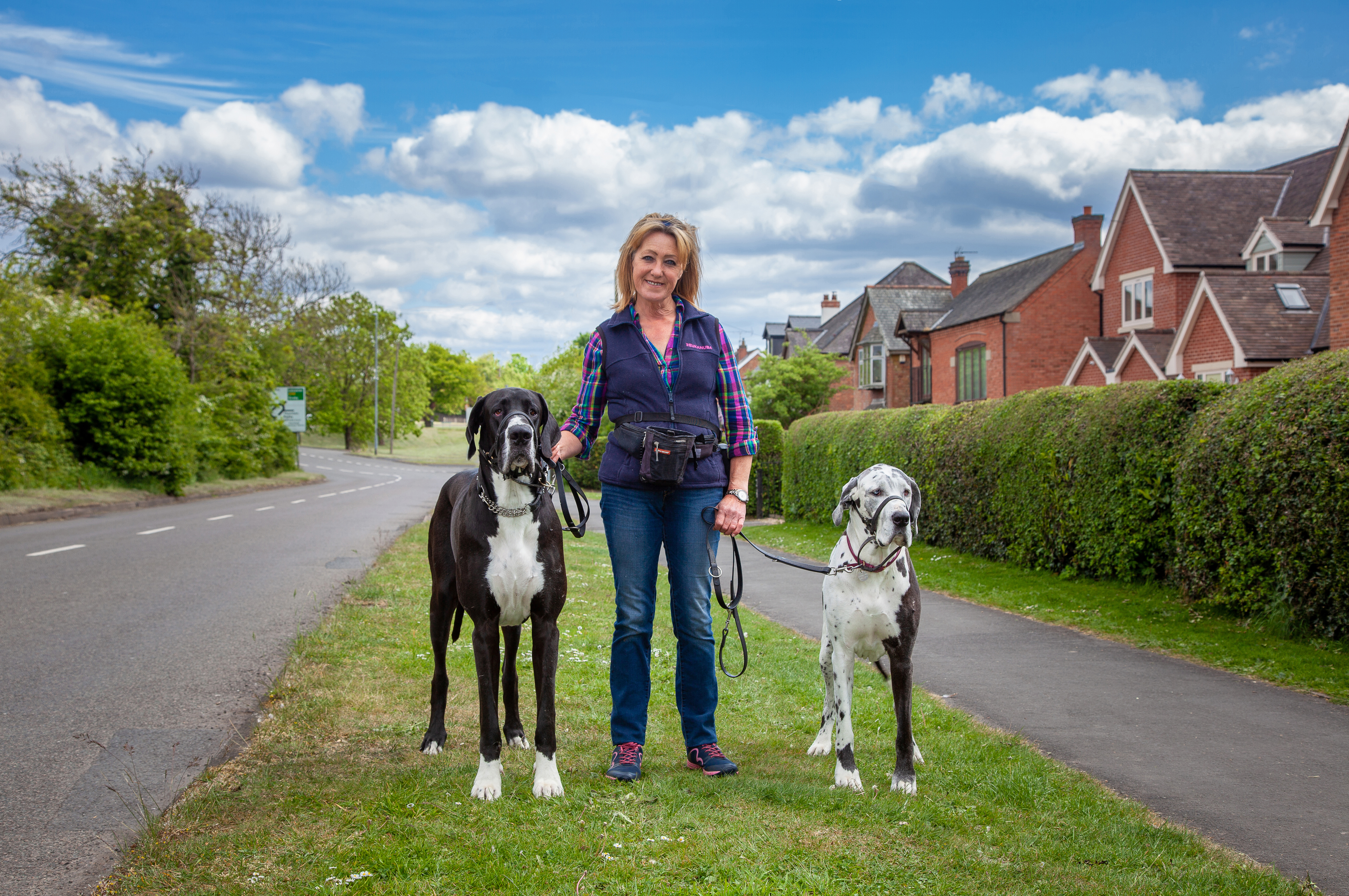

== See also ==
- Cliffe Hill Mineral Railway
- Markfield local history group
