= The War on the West =

2022 book by Douglas Murray

War on the West: How to Prevail in the Age of Unreason
- First edition
- Author: Douglas Murray
- Language: English
- Subject: Western world, Western cultures, Public opinion, Race relations, Critical race theory
- Genre: Political journalism
- Published: 2022 (Broadside Books)
- Publication place: United States
- Media type: Print
- Pages: 320 pages (hardcover)
- ISBN: 9780063162020
- Preceded by: The Madness of Crowds: Gender, Race and Identity
- Followed by: On Democracies and Death Cults: Israel, Hamas and the Future of the West

The War on the West: How to Prevail in the Age of Unreason is a 2022 book by British journalist Douglas Murray. The book is an examination of what he deems to be attempts to destroy Western civilisation from within. Murray argues that a culture war is being waged remorselessly against all the pillars of the western tradition, not sparing everything good that it has produced. His earlier books, The Strange Death of Europe and The Madness of Crowds, address several aspects of this war.

The book debuted at number one on The Bookseller's nonfiction bestseller list in the United Kingdom, and reached the New York Times bestseller list in the United States.

== Synopsis ==
Murray begins the book by describing what he views as the emerging Western cultural consensus, in which "the West was the problem, the dissolving of the West was a solution." He states that although many countries are more abusive and discriminative than the West, nobody speaks of them with an "iota of the rage and disgust poured out daily against the West from inside the West." According to this consensus, if other countries do have any such vices, it must be because the West exported them to a non-Western world of "Edenic innocents." To Murray, world history has increasingly become the history of Western crimes and non-Western innocence.

Murray criticizes this view for what he describes as its counterfactual implication that had any other people got first to discoveries made by the West – of new lands or of the atom bomb – the results would have been more peaceful, equal and just. Murray finds the opposite counterfactual more credible, that the end result would have been far more deadly and destructive had the West not been first in a whole range of discoveries.

Murray outlines what he sees as Western double standards, such as the Muslim slave trade being overshadowed in the popular imagination by the transatlantic slave trade despite their comparable scales. He contrasts the push for reparations for American slaves, which he views as unserious, to the lack of a movement of reparations for the descendants of Arab, Ottoman, or Berber slavery.

Written in the wake of the George Floyd protests, the book criticizes the demolitions of monuments and memorials, calling them the "great iconoclastic rage." Murray notes that alongside statues of pro-slavery Confederates, came down those of Union leaders who opposed slavery, as well as the statue of George Washington who freed his slaves.

According to Murray, anti-Western hate speech and dehumanization of white people is common and tolerated, or even encouraged. He says that the West's most significant institutions, values, events, and almost all pillars of the Western philosophy have been blacklisted for their failure to meet the anti-racist standards of 21st-century progressive Western universities. For Murray, the pendulum of racial issues in the West has swung "past the point of correction and into overcorrection", and the West has been pushed into "racial ultra-awareness" where no part of Western history and culture is safe from the charge of racism.

Murray describes Marxism as the sole exception to this trend, one which remains widely regarded as positive among both non-Western peoples and progressive thinkers in the West as a corrective to colonialism. Murray describes a double standard in treating Marx, whose anti-Semitism and racism he views as "more noxious" than many other Western thinkers criticized for their bigotry, which he explains through anti-Western sentiment.

== Reception ==
Robert Colville described the book as "a convincing and often terrifying case that the barbarians are at the gates."

Matt McManus and Nathan Robinson of Current Affairs Magazine deny the existence of a culture war and describe the book's arguments as overflown with bigotry, which makes its extreme positions appear as "common sense" through "a tone of powdery aloofness." The book is described as a subgenre of polemical conservative, right-wing nonfiction advancing such arguments as "leftists are destroying our great Western culture," "immigration is destabilizing Europe, cancel culture is the enemy of reason, and social justice warriors complain too much about bigotry and oppression."

Jay Elwes in Prospect describes Murray as an example of the "militant nostalgists", who push a single, authorised version of history, which Elwes sees counter to basic Western values. He criticizes Murray's factual arguments, stating that the composition of the British government has not changed for the last several centuries and that in 2020 legislation to protect historic monuments was introduced. If there is anything close to culture war, Elwes argues, the West is winning it. Elwes also criticizes Murray for cherry-picking the most radical examples and being overly focused on American figures, such as Michael Moore, Robin DiAngelo, Ibram X. Kendi and Ta-Nehisi Coates.

== See also ==
- Suicide of the West (Burnham book)
- The Death of the West
- The Professors: The 101 Most Dangerous Academics in America
- Suicide of the West (Goldberg book)
- The Tears of the White Man
- The Tyranny of Guilt
