= Stückelberger =

Stückelberger may refer to:

- Hansjürg Stückelberger (born 1930), a Swiss writer and pastor
- Christine Stückelberger (born 1947), a Swiss equestrian
- Ernst Stückelberg (1831-1903) a.k.a. Stückelberger, a Swiss painter
