= Christian Solidarity Worldwide =

UK-based Christian advocacy organization

CSW
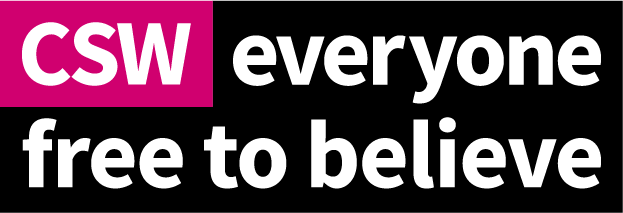
- Formation: 1977
- Type: Christian charity
- Legal status: UN consultative status
- Headquarters: CSW has offices in London, Brussels, Casper, Wyoming, Edinburgh, Washington, D.C., and Kaduna.
- Founder President: Mervyn Thomas (advocate)
- CEO: Scot Bower
- Website: csw.org.uk, forbinfull.org
- Formerly called: Christian Solidarity Worldwide

CSW (formerly Christian Solidarity Worldwide) is a UK-based human rights organisation which specialises in freedom of religion or belief.

CSW operates in over 20 countries across Africa, Asia, Latin America and the Middle East, to ensure that the right to freedom of religion or belief is upheld and protected.

Their vision is a world free from religious persecution, where everyone can practise a religion or belief of their choice. As of 2017, the organization has consultative status at the United Nations.

== Independent advocacy ==
CSW indicates that it is independent of any government or political persuasion, but as an advocacy organisation, CSW also aims to influence governments and other bodies on religious freedom issues in the international arena. The CSW strives to influence attitudes and behaviours, legislation and policies that lead to religious discrimination and religious persecution. They try to achieve lasting change in culture, politics and society.

Through its various resources, events, and initiatives, CSW also aims to mobilise the general public to pray, protest and provide on behalf of people facing discrimination, harassment, mistreatment or persecution on account of their religion or belief.

== History ==
In the 1997, Baroness Caroline Cox founded CSW, which had splintered from Christian Solidarity International.

CSW's current founder president is Mervyn Thomas, who succeeded Jonathan Aitken in 2020.

== Strategies ==
CSW's current Annual Report (2023/24) states that, through in-depth research and advocacy, CSW compiles and analyses evidence of freedom of religion or belief violations, raises awareness, calls on nations where violations occur to uphold this right in accordance with international, national or constitutional obligations, and urges other members of the international community to hold them accountable.

== See also ==
- Persecution of Christians
- Stefanus Alliance International
- Forum 18
- Anti-Christian sentiment
- International Christian Concern, a Christian human rights NGO
