= British neoconservatism =

Political movement

British neoconservatism is an ideology that is a strong proponent of foreign intervention in the Arab world and beyond, supports the role of the private sector in military contracts and is in favour of an alliance with Israel. It shares a world view with its American counterpart regarding threats and opportunities.

== History ==
There is a suspicion in British public life of 'philosophy', which has meant that politicians in the UK rarely refer to any overarching theories. In The Centre-left and New Right Divide?: Political Philosophy and Aspects of UK Social Policy in the Era of the welfare State, for example, Steven Smith argues that academic explanations of the resilience of the welfare state in the face of the New Right reforms have focused on the social, political and economic processes that tend to bolster the activities of state welfare provision, rather than the underlying philosophies.

Spinwatch describes Douglas Murray as the 'enfant terrible' of British neoconservatism. Murray is typical of the movement in arguing that the 'innate flaws of liberal democracy' leave Europe vulnerable to exploitation and domination by Islamic Fundamentalists; and that strong armed forces prepared to go to war are essential to the survival of what he sees as Conservative values. As head of the Centre for Social Cohesion his ideas have been influential in some NATO circles. Philosophically, he claims to be influenced by the authoritarianism of Leo Strauss, and the concept of dhimmitude as it was put forward by Bat Ye'or.^{Bat Ye'or}

Murray's keynote book, Neoconservatism: Why We Need It was published by the Social Affairs Unit in 2005. An inspiration for Murray, who he frequently praises in the book, is the academic philosopher, Roger Scruton, who was part of a group of right-wing Cambridge University intellectuals under the influence of Maurice Cowling, an historian. In 1978 Cowling helped found the Salisbury Group of conservative thinkers (named after the earlier British Prime Minister). In the same year Cowling published Conservative Essays which states:

"If there is a class war - and there is - it is important that it should be handled with subtlety and skill. [...] It is not freedom that Conservatives want; what they want is the sort of freedom that will maintain existing inequalities or restore lost ones".

The original Cambridge group however also included John Vincent, another historian, and Edward Norman, a theologian and historian. As Scruton says in his memoirs Gentle Regrets: Thoughts from a Life, it influenced a new generation of neo-con thinkers including Charles Moore, former editor of The Daily Telegraph, and former Chief Rabbi Jonathan Sacks. Scruton himself offers the French post-war President Charles De Gaulle as a model because the General defined the French nation in terms of its high culture, while detesting the philosopher Michel Foucault, who he says was 'one of the gurus' of his students, for shallow relativism and for teaching that `truth' requires inverted commas.

British neoconservatism has also been directly influenced by its US counterpart. One example is the Henry Jackson Society, founded in Cambridge in 2005, and named after Senator Henry 'Scoop' Jackson, a key influence on US neoconservatism.

== People associated with British neoconservatism ==
The list includes public people identified as personally neoconservative.

=== Politicians ===
- Nicholas Boles
- Liam Fox
- Michael Gove – Editor of The Spectator, former Chancellor of the Duchy of Lancaster and former Conservative MP for Surrey Heath
- Greg Hands
- William Hague
- Michael Howard
- George Osborne
- Iain Duncan Smith
- Tom Tugendhat
- Liz Truss
- Ed Vaizey

=== Journalists and commentators ===
- David Aaronovitch
- Niall Ferguson
- Douglas Murray (author)
- Melanie Phillips
- David Pryce-Jones

== Think tanks and publications ==
- Henry Jackson Society
- Policy Exchange
- Royal United Services Institute
- The Spectator

== See also ==
- Euston Manifesto

== Notes ==
- ^Bat Ye'or Bat Ye'or defined "dhiminitude" as the condition of the non-Muslim persons forced to live under Islamic law in the context of Jihad.
