= Douglas Murray (author) =

British author and political commentator (born 1979)

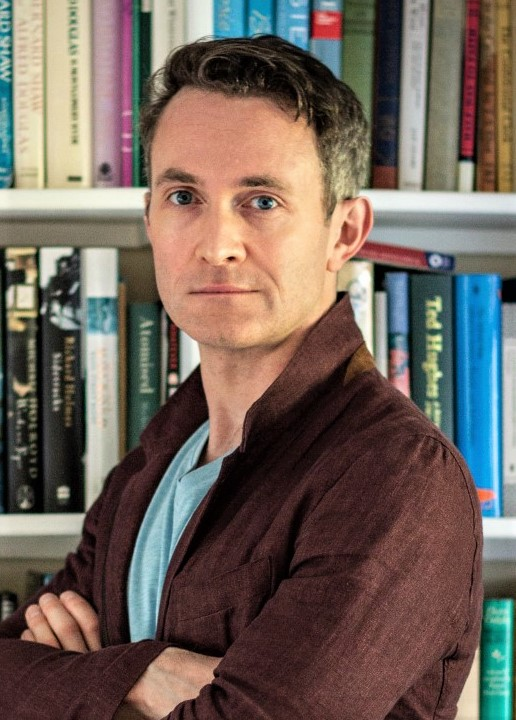
- Murray in 2019
- Born: Douglas Kear Murray; 16 July 1979 (age 47); Hammersmith, London, England
- Education: Magdalen College, Oxford (BA)
- Occupations: Author; political commentator
- Writing career
- Period: 2000–present
- Subjects: Politics; culture; history
- Notable works: Neoconservatism: Why We Need It (2006); The Strange Death of Europe: Immigration, Identity, Islam (2017); The Madness of Crowds: Gender, Race and Identity (2019)
- Website: douglasmurray.net

Douglas Kear Murray (born 16 July 1979) is a British conservative political commentator, cultural critic, author, and journalist. He is an associate editor of the conservative British political and cultural magazine The Spectator, and has been a regular contributor to The Times, The Daily Telegraph, The Sun, the Daily Mail, New York Post, National Review, The Free Press, and UnHerd.

His books include Neoconservatism: Why We Need It (2006), The Strange Death of Europe: Immigration, Identity, Islam (2017), The Madness of Crowds: Gender, Race and Identity (2019), The War on the West (2022), and On Democracies and Death Cults: Israel, Hamas and the Future of the West (2025).

Murray was the associate director of the Henry Jackson Society, a conservative think tank, from 2011 to 2018.

Murray is a critic of immigration into Europe and of Islam. He became better known internationally due to his advocacy for Israel after the October 7 attacks in 2023.

Murray has been praised by conservatives and criticised by others. Articles in the academic journals Ethnic and Racial Studies and National Identities associate his views with Islamophobia and he has been described as promoting far-right ideas such as the Eurabia, Great Replacement, and Cultural Marxism conspiracy theories.

== Early life and education ==
Murray was born in Hammersmith, London, to an English school teacher mother and a Scottish, Gaelic-speaking father who had been born on the Isle of Lewis and who worked as a civil servant. He has one elder brother. In an interview with The Herald, Murray stated that his father had intended to be in London temporarily but stayed after meeting his mother, and that they "encouraged a good discussion around the dinner table" when he was growing up but "neither are political".

Murray was educated at his local state primary and secondary schools, before going to a comprehensive which had previously been a grammar school. Recalling this experience in 2011, he wrote, "My parents had been promised that the old grammar school standards and ethos remained, but none did. By the time I arrived, the school was what would now be described as 'an inner-city sink school', a war zone similar to those many of the children's parents had escaped from." Murray's parents withdrew him from the school after a year. He won scholarships to St Benedict's School, Ealing, and subsequently to Eton College, taught briefly at a school near Aberdeen, then took a degree in English at Magdalen College, Oxford.

== Publications ==
At age 19, while in his second year at the University of Oxford, Murray's Bosie: A Biography of Lord Alfred Douglas was published, which Christopher Hitchens described as "masterly". Bosie was awarded a Lambda Award for gay biography in 2000. After leaving Oxford, Murray wrote a play, Nightfall, about the Swedish diplomat Raoul Wallenberg, who rescued thousands of Jews from the Nazis.

In 2006 Murray authored a defence of neoconservatism – Neoconservatism: Why We Need It – and went on a speaking tour promoting the book in the United States. The publication was subsequently reviewed in the Arabic newspaper Asharq Al-Awsat by the Iranian author Amir Taheri: "Whether one agrees with him or not Murray has made a valuable contribution to the global battle of ideas." In 2007, he assisted in the writing of the Center for Strategic and International Studies's report Towards a Grand Strategy for an Uncertain World: Renewing Transatlantic Partnership, written by Klaus Naumann, John Shalikashvili, Lord Inge, Jacques Lanxade, and Henk van den Breemen. His book Bloody Sunday: Truths, Lies and The Saville Inquiry was (jointly) awarded the 2011–2012 Christopher Ewart-Biggs Memorial Prize and longlisted for the 2012 Orwell Book Prize. In June 2013, Murray's self-published e-book Islamophilia: a Very Metropolitan Malady was released.

In 2017, Bloomsbury published Murray's The Strange Death of Europe: Immigration, Identity, Islam, which spent almost 20 weeks on The Sunday Times bestseller list and was a No. 1 bestseller in non-fiction. It has since been published in over 20 languages. In The Strange Death of Europe, Murray argued that Europe "is committing suicide" by allowing non-European immigration into its borders and losing its "faith in its beliefs". The book received a polarised response from critics. Juliet Samuel of The Daily Telegraph praised Murray, saying that: "His overall thesis, that a guilt-driven and exhausted Europe is playing fast and loose with its precious modern values by embracing migration on such a scale, is hard to refute." An academic review in the Israel Journal of Foreign Affairs acclaimed the book as "explosive" and "an elegantly written, copiously documented exposé of Europe's suicidal hypocrisy". Rod Liddle of The Sunday Times called the book "a brilliant, important and profoundly depressing book".

Other reviews of the book were highly negative. In The Guardian, the political journalist Gaby Hinsliff described Strange Death as "gentrified xenophobia" and "Chapter after chapter circles around the same repetitive themes: migrants raping and murdering and terrorising", also stating that Murray offers little definition of the European culture which he claims is under threat. Writing in The New York Times, Indian novelist Pankaj Mishra described the book as "a handy digest of far-right clichés". Mishra accused Murray of defending Pegida, of writing that the English Defence League "had a point", and of describing Hungarian politician Viktor Orbán as a better sentinel of "European values" than George Soros. Writing in The Intercept, Murtaza Hussain criticised what he called the "relentlessly paranoid tenor" and "apocalyptic picture of Europe" portrayed in the book, while challenging the links Murray made between non-European immigration and large increases in crime. In Middle East Eye, Georgetown University in Qatar professor Ian Almond called the book "a staggeringly one-sided flow of statistics, interviews and examples, reflecting a clear decision to make the book a rhetorical claim that Europe is doomed to self-destruction".

Murray wrote about social justice and identity politics in his 2019 book The Madness of Crowds: Gender, Race and Identity which became a Sunday Times bestseller. Murray's narration of the book was nominated as an audio book of the year for the British Book Awards. In the book, Murray points to what he sees as a cultural shift, away from established modes of religion and political ideology, in which various forms of identity can provide markers of social status. He divides his book into chapters dealing with four different identity groups: "Gay", "Women", "Race" and "Trans." Murray criticises the work of French philosopher Michel Foucault for what he sees as a reduction of society to a system of power relations. Murray's book drew polarised responses from critics. Historian Tim Stanley in The Daily Telegraph praised the book, calling Murray "a superbly perceptive guide through the age of the social justice warrior". Katie Law in the Evening Standard said that Murray "tackled another necessary and provocative subject with wit and bravery". Conversely, William Davies gave a highly critical review of Murray's work in The Guardian, describing the book as "the bizarre fantasies of a rightwing provocateur, blind to oppression".

Murray's book The War on the West: How to Prevail in the Age of Unreason was published in 2022 and debuted at number one on The Bookseller's nonfiction bestseller list in the UK, having sold 11,673 copies in its first week. It also reached the New York Times bestseller list in the United States. The book was characterised by columnist Gerard Baker as an examination of attempts to destroy Western civilisation from sources within. Robert Colville, writing in the Sunday Times, called it "a convincing and often terrifying case that the barbarians are at the gates", and that Murray argues in the book that "a cultural war (...) is being waged remorselessly against all the roots of the western tradition and against everything good that the western tradition has produced."

Murray's book On Democracies and Death Cults: Israel, Hamas and the Future of the West (2025) dissects the October 7 attacks and the West's response to Israel. This response, in his view, was distorted by global antisemitism. The October 7 massacres are described with their sheer inhumanity which defies comprehension. He does not begin history on October 7 but contextualizes the preceding history. He presents counter-arguments to what he regards as a contemptuous bias with which Israeli affairs have been reported by the mainstream media. By "death cult" Murray means the Hamas goal of annihilation of Israel. This challenge, he says, is not Israel's alone, hence the subtitle is "The Future of the West."

== Career ==
Murray founded the Centre for Social Cohesion in 2007, which became part of the Henry Jackson Society, where he was associate director from 2011 to 2018. The society refused to disclose its donors to the House of Commons' standards watchdog.

=== Media career ===
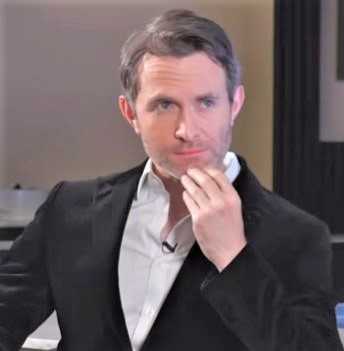
Murray being interviewed on the Mark Steyn Show in 2019

Murray is an associate editor of The Spectator.

In 2016, Murray organised a competition through The Spectator in which entrants were invited to submit offensive poems about Turkish president Recep Tayyip Erdoğan, with a top prize of £1,000 donated by a reader. This was in reaction to the Böhmermann affair, in which German satirist Jan Böhmermann was prosecuted under the German penal code for such a poem. Murray announced the winner of the poetry competition as Conservative MP Boris Johnson (former editor of the magazine, and former mayor of London, and later Prime Minister of the United Kingdom).

==== Roger Scruton tapes ====
In April 2019, New Statesman journalist George Eaton published an article based on an interview with Roger Scruton, which attributed a number of controversial and racist statements to Scruton, who was publicly condemned by various members of Parliament and dismissed from his position as a government housing adviser as a result.

Murray condemned Eaton and the New Statesman for "journalistic dishonesty" and urged Eaton and New Statesman editor Jason Cowley to share the original recording of the interview. When the New Statesman initially refused, Murray acquired the original recording of the interview from unknown sources, which formed the basis of his article in The Spectator titled "The Scruton Tapes: Anatomy of a Modern Hit Job" showing that Scruton's remarks had been taken out of context and misrepresented by Eaton.

The New Statesman subsequently published an apology to Scruton for Eaton's misrepresentation of his words, and housing secretary James Brokenshire apologised to Scruton for his dismissal. Shortly before he died in January 2020, Scruton wrote an article for The Spectator in which he called Murray 'brave' and spoke of his gratitude for Murray's 'generous defence' of his reputation.

== Political views ==
=== Ideology ===
Academic and journalistic sources have variously described Murray's ideology and political views as conservative, neoconservative, far-right, alt-right and Islamophobic. British journalist and broadcaster Peter Oborne described Douglas Murray as an anti-Muslim polemicist. Murray has argued that there is an effort by the left to destroy Western culture, and has argued that criticisms of Western leaders and philosophers are motivated by attempts to hurt the West.

Murray has been accused of putting a socially acceptable face on far-right ideologies. British writer Nafeez Ahmed argued in Middle East Eye that Murray's support for free speech in the wake of the Charlie Hebdo shooting and the January 2015 Île-de-France attacks was "really just a ploy for far-right entryism". In 2019 an article in Social Policy Review described Murray's views as a kind of "mainstreamist" ideology that defies easy categorisation as extremist while remaining "entangled with the far right". Murray has also been described as promoting far-right conspiracy theories, the Eurabia conspiracy theory and the cultural Marxism conspiracy theory.

Philosopher Bernard-Henri Lévy has said of Murray, "Whether one agrees with him or not" he is "one of the most important public intellectuals today". Writer Ayaan Hirsi Ali and columnist Sohrab Ahmari have praised Murray's work and writing on Islam in Europe.

In 2020 columnist Bari Weiss placed Murray within the intellectual dark web, a loosely affiliated group of commentators, with whom she is largely sympathetic but also critical, including Bret Weinstein, Dave Rubin, Joe Rogan, and Sam Harris. Murray has rejected his placement within this group. In 2021, Murray began working for Weiss' The Free Press, and Weiss has described him as a friend. Murray has also confronted Rogan over Rogan's platforming of people, such as Darryl Cooper and Ian Carrol, who Murray sees as having dangerous and fringe views on topics such as Israel, Ukraine and World War II.

=== Christianity ===
Murray stated that he was an Anglican until his twenties. Murray said he lost his faith due to no longer believing in the Virgin birth and finding what Murray described as "repetitions, contradictions and absurdities" within the Bible and Quran. In a 2024 interview, he said that he identifies as agnostic.

Murray has since described himself as a cultural Christian and a Christian atheist. He has frequently praised Christian values and has stressed the importance of Christianity's role in building Western civilization saying "you cannot take Christianity out of the West and have anything that's recognizably the West". He has also criticized Christian churches for breaking away from teaching their traditional beliefs and the Gospels.

In 2018, Murray engaged in a series of discussions about religion with Sam Harris and Jordan Peterson.

=== Islam and Muslims ===
In a February 2006 speech to the Dutch Parliament, Murray said "conditions for Muslims in Europe must be made harder across the board: Europe must look like a less attractive proposition." and that "All immigration into Europe from Muslim countries must stop." Murray's former coworker at the Centre for Social Cohesion, James Brandon, interpreted this speech as calling for the collective punishment of Muslims. After Murray refused politician Paul Goodman's offer to disown these comments, the Conservative Party frontbench severed formal relations with Murray and his Centre for Social Cohesion.

According to Brandon, Murray failed to distinguish Islam from Islamism. Brandon said he attempted to "de-radicalise" Murray to ensure that only Islamists were targeted and not "Muslims as a whole". Brandon writes that Murray has privately retracted some of his comments. In 2010, during an Intelligence Squared US debate titled "Is Islam a Religion of Peace?", Murray argued in his contribution against the motion on the grounds that "[Islamic Prophet] Muhammad was a bad man", citing episodes from Muhammad's private life and his beheading of Jews.

In 2008 Murray listed the cases of 27 writers, activists, politicians, and artists — including Salman Rushdie, Maryam Namazie, and Anwar Shaikh, all three of whom had received death threats due to their criticism of Islam. Murray said that "Unless Muslims are allowed to discuss their religion without fear of attack there can be no chance of reform or genuine freedom of conscience within Islam."

In 2009 Murray was prevented from chairing a debate at the London School of Economics between academic Alan Sked and Hamza Tzortzis on the topic "Islam or Liberalism: Which is the Way Forward?", with the university citing security concerns following a week-long student protest against Israel's invasion of the Gaza strip. The debate took place without Murray chairing. The move was criticised by The Daily Telegraph and The Spectator.

In June 2009, Murray accepted an invitation to a debate with Islamist Anjem Choudary, leader of the banned militant group Al-Muhajiroun, on the subject of Sharia law and British law at Conway Hall. Members of Al-Muhajiroun acting as security guards tried to segregate men and women at the entrance of the event. Clashes broke out near the entrance between Choudary's and Murray's supporters, and Conway Hall cancelled the debate because of the attempted forced separation of men and women. Outside the building, a confrontation between Choudary and Murray over the cancellation of the event occurred. Murray's Centre for Social Cohesion later published a study arguing that one-in-seven Islam-related terrorist cases in the UK could be linked to Al-Muhajiroun.

In the wake of the 2017 London Bridge attack, Murray called for "less Islam" and for reduced immigration.

=== Immigration ===
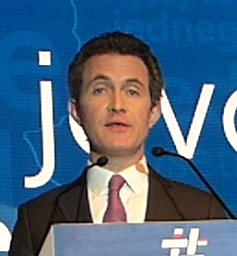
The Future of Europe International Conference, 2018 - The Strange Death of Europe: Immigration, Identity, Islam

Murray is a vocal critic of mass immigration. In March 2013, Murray said that London was a "foreign country" due to "white Britons" becoming a minority in 23 of the 33 London boroughs. In Murray's book The Strange Death of Europe, he writes that Europe and its values are committing suicide due to mass immigration; in the opening pages, he calls for halting Muslim immigration. In the book, he also details crimes committed by immigrants in Europe and writes favourably of immigration hard-liner Viktor Orbán.

In 2018 Murray filmed a video for PragerU entitled "The Suicide of Europe". In the video, he condemned "The mass movement of peoples into Europe...from the Middle East, North Africa and East Asia," and criticised European multiculturalism. Alex Kotch interviewed a senior editor at the Anti-Defamation League's Center on Extremism, Mark Pitcavage, who accused the video of being "filled with anti-immigrant and anti-Muslim rhetoric". Similarly, the Southern Poverty Law Center claimed that the video was a "dog whistle to the extreme right".

In September 2016, Murray supported Donald Trump's proposal for a wall along the southern border of the United States. In January 2017, Murray defended Executive Order 13769, which banned entry to the U.S. by citizens of seven Muslim-majority countries.

=== Gender and sexuality ===
Murray is openly gay. In his book The Madness of Crowds: Gender, Race and Identity, Murray said that homophobia has mostly been vanquished in the West.

Murray has said that it is a lie that a man can become a woman. Media Matters for America reported that in September 2020, during an appearance on Joe Rogan's podcast, Murray paraphrased Camille Paglia and said that "at the end of every empire, they get interested in sexual fluidity, hermaphroditism, and so on." He has stated that he thinks there is no such thing as non-binary gender.

In September 2019, Murray said in an interview that women are held to a different standard than men when it comes to sexual behaviour, citing instances involving Drew Barrymore, Jane Fonda, and Mayim Bialik behaving sexually towards men without backlash from the media.

=== Foreign policy ===
Murray speaking at the Future of Europe conference in Budapest, Hungary in 2018

In his book Neoconservatism: Why We Need It, Murray argues that neoconservatism is necessary for fighting against dictatorships and human rights abuses. Murray wrote in support of the Iraq War in 2004, and defended the war against critics on multiple occasions. He has called for continuing the war on terror on Iran, Syria, and any regime which supports terrorism. In 2021, Murray chastised the Biden administration for withdrawal of US troops from Afghanistan.

In March 2018, Hungarian politician Viktor Orbán posted a photo on his official Facebook account of himself reading the Hungarian-language edition of The Strange Death of Europe by Murray. In May 2018, Murray was personally received by Orbán in Budapest as part of the "Future of Europe" conference, along with other conservative figures such as American political strategist Steve Bannon, and according to Hungarian state media had an individual discussion and photograph with Orbán.

=== Israel and antisemitism ===
In 2013, Murray condemned journalist Owen Jones for claiming that Israel had killed an 11-month old child in a military strike. Jones responded by criticising Murray for ignoring a UN report which said an Israel airstrike had killed numerous innocent civilians. In 2014, Murray defended and supported Israel during the 2014 Gaza War. Murray also defended Israel's right to defend itself, saying, "If you don't believe that Israel has the right to stop a group that has proposed repeatedly since its existence that it wants to annihilate Israel, if you believe that Israel doesn't have the right to try and stop this enemy, then of course you don't believe Israel has the right to exist; you believe Israel has the right to die." In private, Murray and David Frum helped write speeches for Israeli diplomat Ron Prosor during the conflict. During a visit to Israel in 2019, Murray praised Israeli society's "attitude towards nationalism", and lauded Israel's approach to border security.

Starting in October 2023, Murray reported from Israel for six months following the October 7 attacks. He visited the kibbutzim that were attacked in the October 7 war and interviewed Israeli Prime Minister Benjamin Netanyahu. Murray has been a supporter of Israel during the ongoing Gaza war. On 12 October 2023, after the Hamas-led October 7 attacks, he was invited to present a speech at the Lauderdale Road Synagogue in London which defended Jews and the State of Israel, and which gathered almost one million views online. Murray has been a supporter of Israel's military response to the October 7 attacks. He spent around 6 months in Israel, visiting Gaza twice, and writing in defense of Israel's actions. Murray has criticised anti-Israel protests and rhetoric in Western countries like Britain as being motivated by antisemitism and support for terrorism rather than genuine concern for Palestinians. He has described some protests as "terrorist marches" and said they are organised by pro-Hamas factions aiming to spread disinformation.

Murray has argued that much of the criticism of Israel stems from either explicit antisemitism, anti-Western ideology, or ignorance about the realities of the Israeli-Palestinian conflict being exploited by malicious actors.

In April 2024, he received an honorary award from President of Israel Isaac Herzog and Minister of Diaspora Affairs Amichai Chikli for being a "friend to the Jewish people and fighting the resurgence of antisemitism" due to his coverage of the 2023 Hamas-led attack on Israel and the resulting war.

In December 2024, Murray accompanied actor Kevin Spacey in his visit to the Israel–Gaza border. They toured areas impacted by the October 7 attacks.

On April 10, 2025, Murray appeared on The Joe Rogan Experience alongside Dave Smith to debate the Israeli–Palestinian conflict. During the podcast Smith accused Murray of "selective empathy" for the people of Israel and not the people of Gaza. Murray later criticised Rogan for platforming people who spread conspiracy theories and misinformation. Although this was praised by some media outlets, Murray's conduct throughout the debate was criticised on social media.

== Other activities ==
Murray is on the international advisory board of NGO Monitor, a Jerusalem-based NGO described as pro-Israel and right-wing, which was founded in 2001 by professor Gerald M. Steinberg. As of 2022, he was also one of the directors of the Free Speech Union, an organization established by British social commentator Toby Young in 2020 which advocates for freedom of speech, and criticises cancel culture.

In March 2025, he won a libel suit against Guardian Media Group as a result of Kenan Malik, a columnist for The Observer, wrongly attributing comments Murray had made months previously to the riots that erupted across Britain following the stabbing of three young girls in the UK in 2024. Murray received an "unreserved apology" and a "substantial" financial judgement.

In August 2025, he won a libel suit that was brought against him by Muslim activist Mohammed Hijab, because Murray said in 2022 that Hijab had inflamed racial tensions in Leicester during riots between Muslim and Hindu communities. The judge ruled that this was “substantially true”.

== Honours and awards ==
- Manhattan Institute – 2024 Alexander Hamilton Award.
- Special recognition from President Isaac Herzog of Israel in 2024.
- Pillars of Jerusalem award in 2025.

== Personal life ==
Murray is openly gay. He had a regular partner for 10 years up until 2018.

== Works ==
- Bosie: A Biography of Lord Alfred Douglas. Sceptre. 2000. ISBN 978-0-340-79380-0.
- Neoconservatism: Why We Need It. Social Affairs Unit. 2006. ISBN 978-1-59403-344-5.
- Hate on the State: How British libraries encourage Islamic extremism. Co-authored with Brandon, James. Centre for Social Cohesion. 2007. ISBN 978-1-903386-62-0.
- Victims of Intimidation: Freedom of Speech Within Europe's Muslim Communities. Co-authored with Verwey, Johan Pieter. Centre for Social Cohesion. 2008. ISBN 978-0-9560013-1-3.
- Bloody Sunday: Truths, Lies and the Saville Inquiry. Dialogue. 2011. ISBN 978-1-84954-149-7.
- Islamophilia: A Very Metropolitan Malady. emBooks. 2013. ISBN 978-1-62777-050-7.
- The Strange Death of Europe: Immigration, Identity, Islam. Bloomsbury. 2017. ISBN 978-1-4729-4224-1.
- The Madness of Crowds: Gender, Race and Identity. Bloomsbury. 2019. ISBN 978-1-4729-5995-9.
- The War on the West: How to Prevail in the Age of Unreason. Harper Collins. 2022. ISBN 978-0-06-316202-0.
- On Democracies and Death Cults: Israel and the Future of Civilization. Broadside Books. 2025. ISBN 978-0063437135.

== Sources ==
- Busher, Joel (2013). "Grassroots activism in the English Defence League: Discourse and public (dis) order". In Taylor, Max; Holbrook, Donald (eds.). Extreme Right Wing Political Violence and Terrorism. A&C Black. p. 70. ISBN 978-1-4411-4087-6. "Popular commentators and public figures among the [EDL] activists that I have met include Geert Wilders, Robert Spencer, Melanie Philips, Andrew Gilligan, Douglas Murray, Pat Condell, and some of the commentators who contribute to forums like Alan Lake's Four Freedoms website."
