= Caroline Cox, Baroness Cox =

British politician and businesswoman

The Right Honourable The Baroness Cox FRCS FRCN
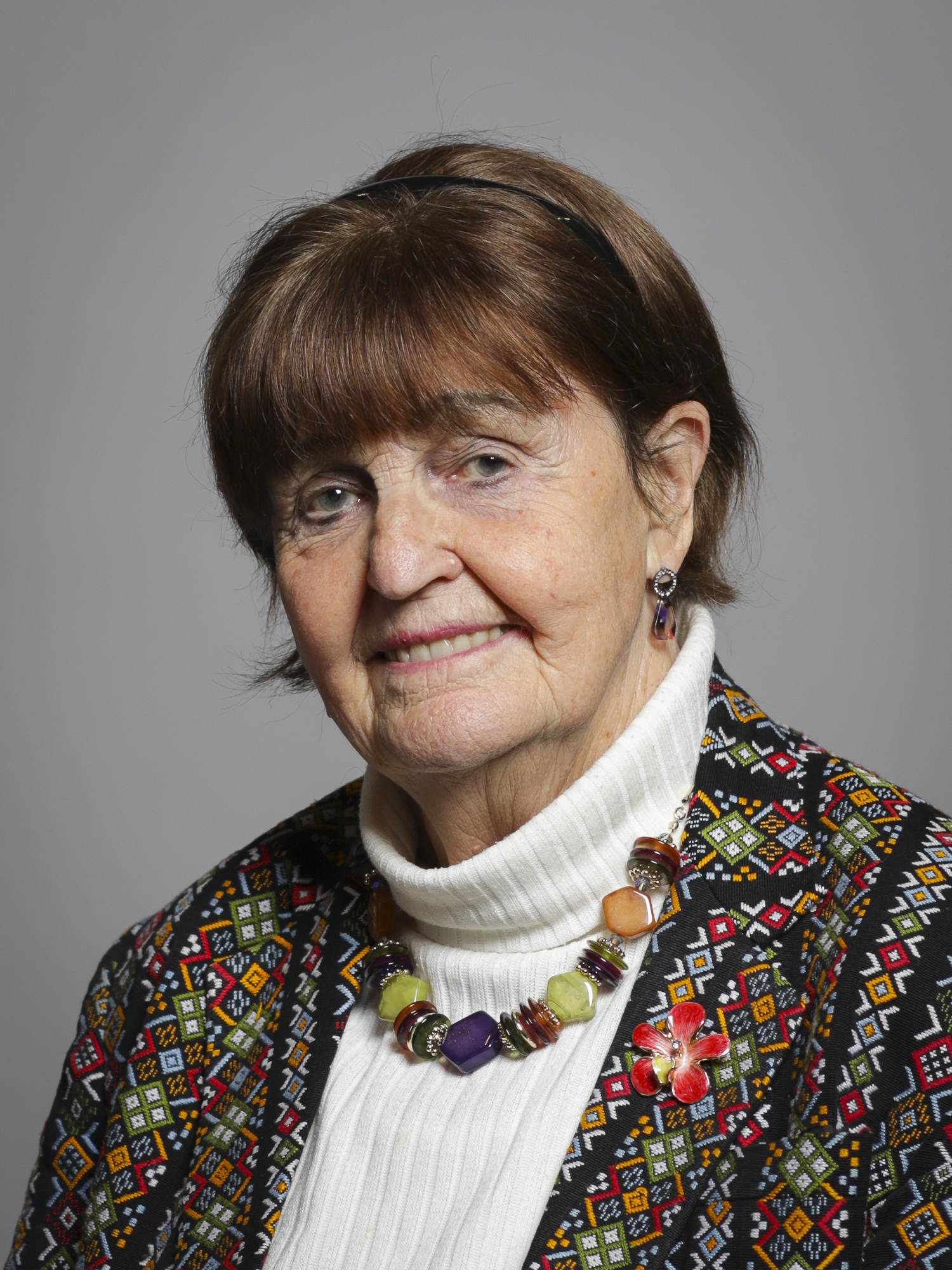
- Official portrait, 2018

Member of the House of Lords
- Lord Temporal
- Life peerage 24 January 1983

Personal details
- Born: Caroline Anne McNeill Love; 6 July 1937 (age 89) London, England
- Party: Crossbench (2004–present); Conservative (until 2004)
- Education: University of London; University of Newcastle-upon-Tyne

Caroline Anne Cox, Baroness Cox, FRCS, FRCN (born Caroline Anne McNeill Love; born 6 July 1937) is a cross-bench member of the British House of Lords. She is also the founder of an organisation called Humanitarian Aid Relief Trust (HART). Cox was created a life peer in 1983 and was a deputy speaker of the House of Lords from 1985 to 2005, as well as being a minister in government. She was also a Baroness-in-Waiting to Queen Elizabeth II. She was Founder Chancellor of Bournemouth University, Chancellor of Liverpool Hope University from 2006 to 2013, and is an Hon. Vice President of the Royal College of Nursing. She was a founder Trustee of MERLIN Medical Emergency Relief International. She is a recipient of the Commander Cross of the Order of Merit of the Republic of Poland.

She is a lay Anglican, closely identified with the Church of England. According to a biography by Andrew Boyd, she is a practising third-order Anglican Franciscan.

== Background ==
Cox was born on 6 July 1937 in London. She is the daughter of Robert McNeill Love, a surgeon and co-author of the textbook known as "Bailey and Love". She was educated at Channing School in Highgate. She became a state registered nurse at London Hospital from 1958, and a staff nurse at Edgware General Hospital from 1960.

She married Dr Murray Newall Cox in 1959, remaining married to him until he died in 1997. The couple had two sons and one daughter. In the late 1960s she studied for a degree at the University of London where she graduated with a first class honours degree in Sociology in 1967 and a master's degree.

== Academic and thinktank career and subsequent activities ==
On graduating, Cox became a sociology lecturer at the Polytechnic of North London rising to become Principal Lecturer. From 1974 she was head of the Department of Sociology. An Evangelicals Now article sympathetically describes her approach to her discipline: "As a committed Christian she presented a Christian view of Sociology." According to Evangelicals Now: "It was a time of student unrest and the students organised demonstrations to disrupt lectures or meetings which they considered anti-Marxist. Cox bore the brunt of this and in 1974 the students passed a vote of no confidence in her." Her background in sociology led her to write books on the subject for nurses.

In 1975, Cox co-wrote (with John Marks and Keith Jacka) The Rape of Reason: The Corruption of the Polytechnic of North London, published by Churchill Press, attacking "Communist activity" at her workplace. She resigned from the Polytechnic in 1977 and was a tutor at the Open University. She was involved in the thinktank Institute for the Study of Conflict and contributed to its report, the Gould report, on left-wing activism in British universities, in which she focused on "Marxist bias" in the Open University.

In 1977 she moved to become Director of the Nursing Education Research Unit at Chelsea College of the University of London and remained in this post until 1984. She was made a Fellow of the Royal College of Nursing in 1985. She was also made an Honorary Fellow of the Royal College of Surgeons. She was later founding Chancellor of Bournemouth University. In 2006 she received an honorary law degree from the University of Dundee and was installed as the Chancellor of Liverpool Hope University in the same year.

=== The Right To Learn ===
After experiencing politically motivated educational disruption whilst working as Principal Lecturer, Sociology at the Polytechnic of North London, she co-wrote The Pied Pipers of Education (1981) for the Social Affairs Unit and worked with the Centre for Policy Studies, for which she wrote the influential pamphlet The Right to Learn (1982). She co-founded and co-directed the Educational Research Trust, founded in 1980, with John Marks; they were consulted about the drafting of the 1988 Education Reform Act, which introduced the National Curriculum, grant-maintained schools and City Technology Colleges.

She was involved in the Institute for European Defence and Security Studies, an organization funded by The Heritage Foundation in the early 1980s for which she co-authored Peace Studies: A Critical Survey in 1984 with Roger Scruton, which was published by the conservative think tank Civitas. She was a director of the Conservative Philosophy Group from 1983 to 1985. With Scruton and others she wrote Education and Indoctrination. In the mid-1980s, she worked with Scruton as part of the Hillgate Group of Conservative activists; their pamphlet Whose Schools? A Radical Manifesto, which she co-authored, was published in 1986. In 1987 she co-founded the Committee for a Free Britain, funded by Rupert Murdoch, which at one point called for "the legalisation of all drugs". She was the executive director of the Institute for the Study of Terrorism in 1985–1990.

Since its founding in 2007, she has been closely involved, first as an advisor and from 2009 as director, in the Centre for Social Cohesion. She is a director of the Gatestone Institute.

== Member of House of Lords ==
Her peerage was announced on 15 December 1982 on a list of "working peers", on the recommendation of Prime Minister Margaret Thatcher, and she was granted the title of Baroness Cox, of Queensbury in Greater London, on 24 January 1983. Cox initially sat as a Conservative and served briefly as a Baroness-in-Waiting to Queen Elizabeth II. She served as a Deputy Speaker of the House of Lords from 1986 to 2006.

=== Foreign affairs ===
Shortly after receiving her peerage in 1983, Baroness Cox became involved in advocating for humanitarian efforts in then communist-ruled Poland, lobbying Prime Minister Margaret Thatcher for government support, and personally delivering medical supplies by truck convoy. This approach of personally visiting areas of humanitarian need would become a hallmark of her international advocacy work because she could then speak to The House with greater authority having 'been an eyewitness', and having 'been with the people and seen the reality'. For her work in Poland she was awarded the Commander Cross of the Order of Merit of the Republic of Poland.

Cox then became a frequent contributor to Lords debates on Africa, and also raised other "forgotten conflicts" in letters to the press. She was already highlighting fighting in Sudan in September 1992, criticising Sudan's Islamist government and backing Dr. John Garang's Sudan People's Liberation Army.

After spending two years investigating the situation in Azerbaijan, Cox criticised the government's treatment of Armenians in the breakaway region of Nagorno-Karabakh in 1993. She has stated that her stance is the "advocacy for Karabakh Armenians". In 2015, she was a member of the Armenian All-Party Parliamentary Group. She is a strong supporter of self-determination for the Armenians of Nagorno-Karabakh. By 2003 she had made more than 60 trips to the region. Frank Pallone, Jr., the co-chairman of the US Congressional Caucus on Armenian Issues, praised her devotion to Armenia and Karabakh. On 15 February 2006 she was awarded the Mkhitar Gosh Medal by the President of Armenia Robert Kocharyan.

Cox is one of eleven officers of the All-Party Parliamentary Group on North Korea. The Group stated that the Obama administration brought with it an opportunity for a formal cessation of hostilities and normalisation of relations with North Korea.

=== Religious Freedom and Women's Rights ===
Since the 1980s, Baroness Cox has advocated for religious freedom for all religions internationally, especially in regions of religious persecution. She has petitioned many questions to the House of Lords advocating religious freedoms, stating to The House that, 'Diverse faith communities suffer persecution in many countries, including the Baha’is in Iran and Egypt, Ahmadyyia Muslims in Pakistan, the Falun Gong and Uighur Muslims in China, Rohingya Muslims in Burma and multi-faith communities of Muslim, Christian and African traditional believers in the states of Blue Nile and Southern Kordofan in Sudan. All deserve the support of the international community for protection of their fundamental human right to practise their faith freely.'.

She has also campaigned to ensure that religious fundamentalism does not infringe on the 'rights enshrined in UK law'. In the aftermath of the September 11 attacks and growing militant Islamic movements, she wrote in 2003 The 'West', Islam and Islamism: Is ideological Islam compatible with liberal democracy? with John Marks, published by Civitas, which argued "that Islamist terrorism was only part of a broader ideological challenge of fundamentalist Islam, comparable to communist propaganda efforts during the Cold War".

In order to protect women's rights in the context of religious tribunals, Cox introduced the Arbitration and Mediation Services (Equality) Bill to the House of Lords, initially on 10 May 2012. It was 'motivated by concern for Muslim women, with the observation that "Equality under the law is a core value of British justice. My bill seeks to preserve that standard. Many women say: 'We came to this country to escape these practices only to find the situation is worse here.". It had its second reading and debate on 19 October 2012, but went no further.

The bill aimed to prevent discrimination against Muslim women and 'jurisdiction creep' in Islamic tribunals, which would be forced to acknowledge the primacy of English law under her Bill and would have introduced an offence carrying a five-year jail sentence for anyone falsely claiming or implying that sharia courts or councils have legal jurisdiction over family or criminal law. The bill included clauses to protect women's rights by banning the sharia practice of giving women's testimony only half the weight of men's. In a similar way to Jewish Beth Din courts, sharia tribunals can make verdicts in cases involving financial and property issues which, under the Arbitration Act 1996, are enforceable by the County Court or the High Court and Baroness Cox stated that "We cannot sit here complacently in our red and green benches while women are suffering a system which is utterly incompatible with the legal principles upon which this country is founded. If we don't do something, we are condoning it." The Bill was described by critics as "inflammatory". It did not reach a vote as it ran out of time.

Cox continues fighting to stop sharia 'seeping' into enforcing divorce settlements. Cox re-introduced her legislation on 11 June 2014. One leading Muslim Conservative Party activist said "the Bill will not help to achieve any of its intended goal but will alienate many Muslims".

Cox, speaking at a 2014 event organised by the Yuval Ne’eman Workshop for Science, Technology and Security at Tel Aviv University and The Israeli Institute for Strategic Studies, mentioned the alleged ‘Trojan Horse plot’ in her speech as an example of secret takeover strategies by ‘Islamists’ in Africa made in order to ‘Islamize’ the continent. She said "“Islam is using the freedoms of democracy to destroy it.”

In 2014, she hosted the parliamentary launch of Sharia Watch UK, an organisation led by UKIP candidate Anne Marie Waters aiming to 'document the implementation of Sharia law in Britain'. Cox said Sharia law "undermines the most fundamental principles of equality enshrined in British law" in respect of its treatment of women.

In February 2023 it was reported in The Guardian that Cox and Lord Pearson were members of a secret group called the New Issues Group, which had been operating out of the House of Lords for over a decade and had worked with far-right anti-Muslim activists. Cox has been described as part of the counter-jihad movement.

She has also campaigned for greater protection of young women at risk of Female Genital Mutilation, raising to the house in 2013 that, 'There is a child somewhere today in this country, in school, in a hospital A and E Department or on a bus, who has had FGM or is at risk of this torture, who is counting on us to help her with her physical or emotional trauma—or crying out to stop it happening. That child’s protection is our responsibility.'

=== Education ===
Whilst stating to The House that she 'welcomes teaching that increases tolerance and understanding, and which reduces the likelihood of victimisation of homosexual groups or individuals', she supported Section 28, which limited the "promotion" of homosexuality in British schools.

During the debates over the Education Reform bill, Cox worked together with Michael Alison to ensure that a commitment was made that state education was 'broadly Christian' in character. The bill later passed as the Education Reform Act 1988. She backed the reforms to reduce powers of Local Education Authorities in 1993.

Baroness Cox has petitioned the government to be more comprehensive in its education of young women at risk of Female Genital Mutilation, stating that the education system is a 'weak link' in protecting young women and that 'education about FGM should also be a compulsory element of personal, social, health and economic education, starting with primary-age children, to enable them to seek help, protection and prevention'.

=== Relationship with Europe and Migration ===
Cox considers herself to be a 'tentative Eurosceptic', considering that, 'Sharply diverging demographics within the EU will make EU-wide one size fits all policies inappropriate in many spheres'. She rebelled over the Maastricht Treaty, in favour of letting the country decide by supporting an amendment to require a nationwide referendum on ratification on 14 July 1993. In May 2004 she joined three other Conservative peers in signing a letter published by the UK Independence Party urging voters to support it in the elections to the European Parliament. The Leader of the Conservative Party, Michael Howard, immediately withdrew the party whip, formally expelling them from the parliamentary party. Cox now sits in the House of Lords as a crossbencher.

She sits on the Advisory Council of Migration Watch, and has also advocated for the rights of domestic immigrant workers in the UK to ensure they receive legal protection regarding working conditions.

=== Hosting Controversial Figures ===
In 2002, she controversially endorsed and hosted the launch of the book Great Britain has Fallen by Wale Babatunde, a minister at the World Harvest Christian Centre in London, which said "that multi-culturalism is ruining Britain by importing 'foreign practices', homosexuality is 'destructive' and that abortion can be directly equated with the Holocaust" and described lesbianism as "against nature". In response, Labour's Tom Watson called for her expulsion from the Conservative Party.

In February 2009, Cox and UKIP peer Lord Pearson invited Dutch Freedom Party leader Geert Wilders to show the anti-Islam film Fitna before the House of Lords. However, Wilders was prevented from entering the UK on the instructions of Labour Home Secretary Jacqui Smith. In response, Cox and Pearson accused the Government of appeasing militant Islam.

In 2010, Cox and Pearson successfully hosted Wilders and his film screening in the UK, with 200 members of the English Defence League marching in support of the screening, as well as anti-fascist protests and 50 arrests. Lady Cox said the visit had been a victory for free speech, saying: "You don't have to agree but it is important to debate sensibly in a responsible and very democratic way." At the event, Wilders called for an end to immigration to Europe from Muslim countries, but that Muslims already in Europe who agree to obey the law would be welcome to remain. A Home Office spokesperson said the government "regrets the decision by Baroness Cox and Lord Pearson".

== NGO work and Christian activities ==
Since 2009, Baroness Cox has participated in a conservative umbrella body within the Church of England, the Federation of Confessing Anglicans, led by her close associate, then Bishop of Rochester Michael Nazir-Ali.

=== The Tushinskaya Children's Hospital Trust ===
Baroness Cox is president of the Tushinskaya Children's Hospital Trust and worked closely with its late patron, Diana, Princess of Wales. Baroness Cox and the Princess of Wales opened the hospital's school of paediatric nursing in 1995. The Trust enabled parents to spend more time with their children whilst they were in hospital.

=== Humanitarian Aid Relief Trust ===
The Humanitarian Aid Relief Trust (HART), founded by Baroness Cox in 2003, works to provide lasting change through aid and advocacy for those suffering oppression and persecution, who are largely neglected by the international media. An Australian branch of HART was established in 2009.

=== Christian Solidarity International and Worldwide ===
Cox was active in Christian Solidarity International (CSI) before leading the breakaway Christian Solidarity Worldwide in 1997. She was president of the latter until 2006, when she was replaced by Jonathan Aitken, thereafter remaining as its patron.

During the 1992–93 Armenia-Azerbaijan war, CSI broke Azerbaijan’s blockade of the contested Nagorno-Karabakh territory numerous times to deliver humanitarian aid and document acts of violence against the Christian Armenian inhabitants of Nagorno-Karabakh. CSI also partnered with the Andrei Sakharov foundation to send aid to refugees from Nagorno-Karabakh. Witnessing the war on the ground, CSI published a detailed account of the First Nagorno-Karabakh War titled Ethnic Cleansing in Progress: War in Nagorno Karabakh co-authored by Cox with John Eibner. Cox visited the Lachin corridor in 2023 and called the blockade of the corridor by Azerbaijan a modern day tragedy.

CSI’s involvement with Sudan began in 1992, when Cox and Eibner, two of the organization's leaders, traveled to southern Sudan at the invitation of local churches to observe the effects of the civil war on the Christian populations there. CSI became especially involved in "redeeming" slaves (buying their freedom) in 1995.

Between 1997 and 2000, Christian Solidarity Worldwide (CSW) directly intervened to buy the freedom of alleged slaves, and in a letter to The Independent on Sunday Cox claimed and redeemed 2,281 slaves on eight visits to Sudan. Both the veracity of this claim as well as the rationale, ethics, and legality of "slave redemption" have been questioned by others in humanitarian community. Cox repeated the figure in 2011, adding that she had spent £100,000 buying and freeing slaves, a tactic most anti-slavery charities condemned, arguing that such purchases only perpetuate and encourage the trade.

In 1995 she won the Wilberforce Award. She is also a patron of the Christian Institute.

=== Global Panel Foundation and Prague Society ===
Cox is a member of the Board of Advisors of the Global Panel Foundation, an NGO that works behind the scenes in crisis areas around the world. Baroness Cox is also a member of the Prague Society for International Cooperation, an NGO which grew out of the dissident-movement against Communism. The main goals are to fight corruption in Central and Eastern Europe and the development of a new generation of responsible, well-informed leaders and thinkers.

=== Disability activism ===
Cox supports disability causes as a member of the World Committee on Disability. In 2004 she was a judge for the Franklin Delano Roosevelt International Disability Award, distributed annually at the United Nations in New York to a nation that has met the goals of the UN World Programme of Action Concerning Disabled Persons.

=== Syria controversy ===
Cox has been a supporter of Syria's President Bashar al-Assad. She visited him during the Syrian Civil War, during the siege of Aleppo, along with Michael Nazir-Ali, fellow crossbench peer Lord Hylton, and Andrew Ashdown, an Anglican vicar. She was widely condemned. Labour MP John Woodcock, vice-president of the All Party Parliamentary Group on Syria, said: "It is shocking to see a British parliamentarian giving international pariah al-Assad a photo opportunity to distract from the brutal and ongoing slaughter he is perpetrating on Syrian families. Whatever good intentions this British delegation has will fail; their presence at this man's side can only strengthen him as his campaign of terror continues." Liberal Democrat peer Baroness Hussein-Ece said it was "shameful" for members of the House of Lords to "sit down for a chat with a mass murderer and a war criminal". Russian state media claimed Cox said that Assad had an “openness for the development of civil society, democracy and change”. After her visit, in early 2017, she went to the US to lobby for president Assad's government. While there, she expressed doubt that Syrian government forces were responsible for Khan Shaykhun chemical attack.

In late 2017, she returned to Syria again, along with former Archbishop of Canterbury, George Carey. She reportedly met with an Assad advisor named on American and European Union sanctions lists as complicit in Syrian government war crimes. Again, the visit was widely condemned by politicians and human rights groups in the UK, and described by analysts as a “propaganda coup” for the Assad government. In a subsequent parliamentary debate, she referred to Syrian rebels as "jihadists".

== Media appearances ==
Baroness Cox regularly appears on the BBC Daily Politics television programme and has presented the "Soap Box" with "A Moral Maze". As of 2017, she also appeared on Russia TV and other channels associated with the Russian government as she felt they were more frank about Islam's threat to Western traditions.

== Honours ==
Cox has been honoured with the Wilberforce Award.

Coat of arms of Caroline Cox, Baroness Cox
| Escutcheon Azure a sword in fess the blade couped at the point Argent the hilt pommel and quillons to the sinister Or between two ancient lamps also Or enflamed Proper. Supporters Dexter a horse Argent crined and hoofed Or, sinister a unicorn Argent its horn Or crined and unguled Gold. Motto Think And Thank |

== Bibliography ==
- A Sociology of Medical Practice (1975)
- Rape of Reason: The Corruption of the Polytechnic of North London (Keith Jacka, with Caroline Cox and John Marks, jt au 1975)
- The Right to Learn (jt au 1982)
- Sociology: A Guide for Nurses, Midwives and Health Visitors (jt au 1983)
- Choosing a State School: how to find the best education for your child (jt au 1989)
- Trajectories of Despair; misdiagnosis and maltreatment of Soviet orphans (with John Eibner 1991)
- Ethnic Cleansing in Progress: war in Nagorno Karabakh (1993)
- Islam, Islamism and the West: Is ideological Islam compatible with liberal democracy? (2005)
- Made to Care: the case for residential and village communities for people with a mental handicap
- Baroness Cox: A voice for the voiceless. (1999) Boyd, A. Lion Books. ISBN 0-7459-3735-7

== Published Biographies ==
Lady Cox has been the subject of two published biographies, Baroness Cox: A Voice for the Voiceless by Andrew Boyd; and Baroness Cox: Eyewitness to a Broken World by Lela Gilbert.
