= Educational Research Trust =

Educational charity based in England

- Founded: 1985; 41 years ago
- Purpose: Education
- Region served: United Kingdom

The Educational Research Trust is a British charity based in Harrow, London, England. It was founded in 1985 by John Marks and Baroness Cox) to improve standards in schools. The trust was consulted about the drafting of the 1988 Education Reform Act, which introduced the National Curriculum, grant-maintained schools and City Technology Colleges.

== Organization ==
The Trust's main charitable objects as listed on documents lodged with the Charities Commission are:

- To promote the advancement of knowledge in the field of education in all its branches
- To promote and undertake research into education or educational standards of any kind (but with particular reference to the philosophical and religious principles of involved in education)
- To publish and disseminate the useful results of any research undertaken as aforesaid

=== Trustees and directors ===
The charity's trustees are Mrs Jessica Douglas-Home, Professor Roger Scruton, and Mr L. Norcross. The organisation's directors are Dr John Marks, a former Professor of the private University of Buckingham and Baroness Cox. They are both also directors of the Centre for Social Cohesion.
