= The Strange Death of Europe =

2017 book by Douglas Murray

- Cover of the 2018 updated edition
- Author: Douglas Murray
- Language: English
- Subjects: Politics; immigration; Islam
- Publisher: Bloomsbury Publishing
- Publication date: 4 May 2017
- Publication place: United Kingdom
- Media type: Print (Hardcover and paperback)
- Pages: 352
- ISBN: 978-1-4729-4224-1
- OCLC: 1027567742
- Preceded by: Islamophilia: A Very Metropolitan Malady
- Followed by: The Madness of Crowds: Gender, Race and Identity
- Text: The Strange Death of Europe at Internet Archive

The Strange Death of Europe: Immigration, Identity, Islam is a 2017 book by the British journalist and political commentator Douglas Murray. It was published in the United Kingdom in May 2017, and in June 2017 in the United States.

The book's title was inspired by George Dangerfield's classic of political history The Strange Death of Liberal England, published in 1935.

== Thesis ==
Murray contends that European civilization as it has historically existed will not survive. He explores several factors in explaining this: The main is the ongoing demographic shift caused by combination of mass immigration of new peoples with high birth rates, European low birth rates, and the resilience of Muslim peoples to integration. European politicians are too weak to halt the shift. At "the same time Europe lost faith in its beliefs, traditions, and legitimacy," and became overwhelmed by the sense of self-hatred, compassion, and historical guilt.

== Reception ==
The Strange Death of Europe received a polarized reception among critics and commentators. Writing in the National Review, Michael Brendan Dougherty praised it as "informed by actual reporting across the Continent, and a quality of writing that manages to be spritely and elegiac at the same time. Murray's is also a truly liberal intellect, in that he is free from the power that taboo exerts over the European problem, but he doesn't betray the slightest hint of atavism or meanspiritedness". Rod Liddle of The Sunday Times called the book "a brilliant, important and profoundly depressing book". In The Daily Telegraph, Juliet Samuel summarised Murray's book by saying, "His overall thesis, that a guilt-driven and exhausted Europe is playing fast and loose with its precious modern values by embracing migration on such a scale, is hard to refute". Conservative political commentator John O'Sullivan concluded in his review that "Europe is drifting towards Eurabia". Other commentators and writers who spoke positively of the book included Roger Scruton and Nick Cohen.

Conversely, other reviews were very negative. Writing in The Guardian, the political journalist Gaby Hinsliff described Strange Death as "gentrified xenophobia" and "Chapter after chapter circles around the same repetitive themes: migrants raping and murdering and terrorising; paeans to Christianity; long polemics about how Europe is too 'exhausted by history' and colonial guilt to face another battle, and is thus letting itself be rolled over by invaders fiercely confident in their own beliefs", while also pointing out that Murray offers little definition of the European culture he claims is under threat. Pankaj Mishra's review in The New York Times described the book as "a handy digest of far-right clichés". In The Intercept, Murtaza Hussain criticized the "relentlessly paranoid tenor" of Murray's work and said that its claims of mass crime perpetuated by immigrants were "blinkered to the point of being propaganda", while noting the book's appeal to the far right. In Middle East Eye, Georgetown professor Ian Almond called the book "a staggeringly one-sided flow of statistics, interviews and examples, reflecting a clear decision to make the book a rhetorical claim that Europe is doomed to self-destruction".

A more mixed review of the book in The Economist claimed it "hit on some unfortunate truths", but "shows an incomplete picture of Europe today." Furthermore, it said that "the book would benefit, however, from far more reporting" and claimed Murray often "lets fear trump analysis" and was "prone to exaggeration."

== Editions ==
- Murray, Douglas (2017-05-04), The Strange Death of Europe: Immigration, Identity, Islam (Hardcover ed.), London: Bloomsbury Continuum, ISBN 978-1-4729-4224-1
  - Murray, Douglas (2018-06-14), The Strange Death of Europe: Immigration, Identity, Islam (Paperback ed.), London: Bloomsbury Continuum, ISBN 978-1-4729-5800-6 - added Murray's Afterword on pp. 321–337 at April 2018.
- Murray, Douglas (2018-03-12), Der Selbstmord Europas: Immigration, Identität, Islam (in German), translated by Krisztina Koenen (EDITION TICHYS EINBLICK ed.), München: FinanzBuch Verlag, ISBN 978-3-95972-105-9
- Murray, Douglas (2018-04-25), L'étrange suicide de l'Europe: Immigration, identité, Islam, TOUC.ESSAIS (in French), translated by Julien Funnaro, Paris: L'artilleur, ISBN 978-2-81000-825-4
- Murray, Douglas (2018-11-15), La strana morte dell'Europa. Immigrazione, identità, Islam (in Italian), translated by Annamaria Biavasco e Valentina Guani, Vieenza: Neri Pozza Editore, ISBN 978-88-545-1701-1
- Murray, Douglas (2018-12-14), Seiyō no jishi: Imin, Aidentitī, Isuramu (in Japanese), translated by Atsuo Machida, Takeshi Nakano (foreword), Tokyo: Toyo Keizai Inc., ISBN 978-4-492-44450-4

== See also ==
- The Death of the West (2001)
- Germany Abolishes Itself (2010)
- Le Suicide français (2014)
