= Christian Solidarity International =

Christian human rights NGO

- Abbreviation: CSI
- Formation: 1977; 49 years ago
- Type: Non-governmental organization
- Legal status: Special Consultative Status at the UN
- Purpose: Human rights of Christians
- Headquarters: Zurich, Switzerland
- Region served: Worldwide
- Leaders: John Eibner
- Website: csi-int.org

Christian Solidarity International (CSI) is a Switzerland-based Christian NGO with affiliates in the United States, Czech Republic, France, Germany, Hungary, and South Korea. The organization drew international attention to the resurgence of slavery during the Second Sudanese Civil War as well as for the organization's controversial slave-buy-back campaign which, between 1995 and 1999, paid slave owners for the freedom of more than 100,000 people.

In 2023, the organization’s special consultative status at the United Nations Economic and Social Council was restored, previously lost in 1999 at the request of the Sudanese government.

== Current Campaigns ==
The organization currently is engaged in four distinct campaigns.

| Campaign title | Focus Area |
| "End the Sanctions on Syria" | Advocates for the lifting of broad-based Western economic sanctions that CSI believed afflicted the welfare of ordinary Syrians, especially religious minorities. Supports maintaining targeted sanctions. |
| "Stop the New Armenian Genocide" | Raises international awareness about the forced displacement and persecution of over 100,000 Armenians from Nagorno-Karabakh. Campaigns for the release of political detainees and prevention of further aggression. |
| "Nigeria Report" | Documents ongoing sectarian violence and persecution of Christians by extremist groups and state actors. Promotes international recognition of the situation as a genocide and urges protective measures for vulnerable communities. |
| "Free the Captives" | Focuses on freeing individuals who have been imprisoned, enslaved, or abducted because of their Christian faith. Urges international pressure to release captives and uphold religious freedom. |

The organization is also a member of the Alliance Against Genocide (AAG), and works with the American Anti-Slavery Group (AASG) and Coalition for the Defense of Human Rights (CDHR).

== History ==
CSI was founded in 1977 in Switzerland by Swiss pastor and writer Hansjürg Stückelberger.

In the 1990s, several groups broke away from the central CSI organization and became independent NGOs. These splinter groups include International Christian Concern, founded by Steve Snyder in 1995, Christian Solidarity Worldwide, founded by Baroness Caroline Cox in 1997, and Christian Freedom International, founded by Jim Jacobson in 1998.

=== Slave buy-back programme ===
CSI's participation in slave liberation efforts in Sudan has received criticism. In 1999, UNICEF called the practice of buying slaves to free them "intolerable," saying that it was not a "lasting solution" to the slavery problem and faulting it for implicitly accepting that human beings can be purchased. UNICEF also said that paying money for slaves provided combatants in the war with cash for buying weapons. Human Rights Watch stated that buying back slaves might provide a "monetary incentive" for further slave raiding and warned of the "risk of fraud in the redemption process. " In 2002, a United States State Department report on the issue declared, "As a matter of principle, no person holding another who has been abducted or enslaved should be paid to secure that person's release. ...we believe that some legitimate concerns about this practice have been raised." Other critics agree that the campaign "encourages the taking of slaves" and "reduces the incentive for owners to set them free without payment" (The New York Times), or "undercuts" the "battle against slavery" (Richard Miniter for The Atlantic).

CSI responded to UNICEF's 1999 critique by claiming that it never brought American dollars into the warzone, and redeemed slaves only with Sudanese pounds to decrease the potential for fueling the arms trade. Others, including Francis Bok who was a slave in Sudan for 10 years, have defended CDI's buy-back-slave program, noting that the organization has purchased the freedom of about 80,000 people.

=== International Religious Freedom Act ===
The organization was also instrumental in applying legislative pressure that resulted in the passing of the USA's International Religious Freedom Act of 1998.

=== Sudan and UN status ===
In 1999, at the request of the Government of Sudan, the United Nations revoked CSI's status as a consultative NGO. The trigger for the change in status was when CSI allowed John Garang, the leader of the Sudanese People’s Liberation Movement, to speak on its behalf at the UN Commission on Human Rights. John Garang, would later became the First Vice President of Sudan following the 2005 Comprehensive Peace Agreement, which ended the country’s 23-year civil war. An opinion piece in The New York Times by A. M. Rosenthal described the revocation as a "piece of nastiness" that amounted to "permitting a slave-taking nation to stifle an organization that struggles for slave-freeing”.

In response to the Darfur genocide, CSI helped to launch the "Sudan Campaign" in the summer of 2004, along with Freedom House, the Institute for Religion and Democracy, and a number of left-wing activists. The campaign led to petitions that multinational corporations and pension funds divest from Sudan and staged a civil disobedience program which involved a number of prominent civil rights leaders and human rights activists being arrested at the Sudanese embassy in Washington DC.

=== Middle East campaign ===
In 2008, journalist Charles Sennott wrote that CSI was "overreacting to events in the Middle East" in its campaign to save Iraqi Christians. In 2009, CSI published a study of the abduction and forced marriage of young Christian Coptic girls by Muslim families.

=== Restoring UN status ===
In 2012, CSI reapplied for special consultative status at the UN, but its application was repeatedly stalled by the UN NGO Committee through procedural delays. In June 2023, an ECOSOC vote (24 in favor, 12 against, 11 abstentions) overturned the committee’s previous rejection, and re-instated CSI's special consultative status.

=== Nagorno-Karabakh ===
In October 2020, CSI said Armenian Christians in Nagorno-Karabakh were again under attack by Azerbaijani forces backed by Turkey and jihadist fighters from Syria. It appealed for solidarity and emergency aid for displaced residents, spoke publicly for threatened Christians, and warned of another Armenian genocide. In January 2023, CSI called for an airlift between Yerevan and Stepanakert.

== See also ==
- Anti-Christian sentiment
- International Christian Concern, a Christian human rights NGO
- Persecution of Christians
- Religious intolerance
- Religious persecution
- Slavery in Sudan
- Second Sudanese Civil War
