= The Happiness Industry =

2015 book by William Davies

The Happiness Industry: How Government and Big Business Sold Us Well-Being
- Author: William Davies
- Language: English
- Subject: Psychology, Opposition to Positive Psychology, Philosophy, Politics, Sociology
- Published: 2015
- Publisher: Verso Books
- Publication place: United Kingdom
- Media type: Print (hardcover and paperback)
- Pages: 314

The Happiness Industry: How Government and Big Business Sold Us Well-Being is a 2015 book written by William Davies, in which the author proposes that the contemporary notions of happiness and well-being are being warped by the forces of numerous governmental and business institutions to transform happiness, as a concept, into something that promotes consumption.

== Summary ==
William Davies begins his work by analyzing the philosophy of 19th century Utilitarian theorist Jeremy Bentham, who famously asserted that humanity can objectively determine ethical decisions by measuring the pleasure or pain that results as a consequence. This begins the rise of what Davies regards as "The Anti-Philosophical Agnosticism" in the psychological community, wherein happiness as a concept is warped from being a personal subjective experience to an objective quantifiable phenomenon. This "Anti-Philosophical Agnosticism" is further reflected in the works of economist William Stanley Jevons, behaviorist John Watson, and The Chicago School of Economics. The main problem of quantifying pleasure and happiness is there is no one factor that may be objectively observed, since emotions are by their natures subjective experiences; so, according to Davies, psychologists have used other units to measure happiness such as money, dopamine, and body language. Using quantifiable physical phenomenon to measure happiness ultimately reduces happiness to a simple utility.

The promotion of this psychological perspective is leading to greater amounts of mental health problems, alienation and manipulation by political and economic elites. Davies warns that the continued expansion of mass surveillance, targeted advertising and psychological profiling is leading to a society in which individuals' emotions are constantly being manipulated by state and corporate forces to be politically docile and economically efficient.

== Reception ==
The Happiness Industry was reviewed in magazines and newspapers, including The Guardian, The Independent, and Kirkus Reviews. The book has received mostly positive reviews from critics, especially those of the political left. Literary critic Terry Eagleton praised Davies in a review published by The Guardian.

== See also ==
- Late capitalism
- Surveillance capitalism
- Positive psychology
- Big data
- Consumerism
- Criticism of capitalism
- Happiness economics
