= Centre for Social Cohesion =

British think tank

- Merged into: Henry Jackson Society
- Formation: 2007
- Dissolved: 2011
- Headquarters: London, UK
- Director: Douglas Murray

The Centre for Social Cohesion (CSC) was a right-wing British think tank with its headquarters in London. Founded in 2007 as part of another London think tank, Civitas, it became independent in 2008 and was eventually subsumed into a separate London think tank, the Henry Jackson Society, in April 2011.

The director of the CSC was writer and commentator Douglas Murray, the author of Neoconservatism: Why We Need It. According to Al Jazeera, the CSC produced reports that covered issue areas including the rise of Islamist extremism and neo-fascism in the United Kingdom, as represented by the British National Party (BNP).

== Foundation and constitution ==
CSC was established with funding of circa £275,000 from Civitas. The organisation was constituted as a company limited by guarantee. It was incorporated and registered with Companies House in June 2008. Companies House records indicate that, as of 5 January 2009, the company's directors were Baroness Cox, former professor of the private University of Buckingham, Dr John Marks, and author Dr Ruth Dudley Edwards. Cox and Marks are also directors of the Educational Research Trust.

CSC shared its Clutha House premises in London with The Pilgrim Trust, Civitas, and Policy Exchange. Unlike similar think tanks, including its stable fellows Civitas and Policy Exchange, the Centre for Social Cohesion is not registered with the Charity Commission for England and Wales. According to Companies House, the Centre for Social Cohesion was dissolved on 15 January 2013.

== Activities and director ==
The CSC's web site indicated that its aims were to foster new attitudes to help bring Britain's ethnic and religious communities closer together, while strengthening British traditions of openness, tolerance, and democracy. It researched ethnic and religious communities and organisations in the UK and published analyses.

The centre's Director was Douglas Murray, author of Neoconservatism: Why We Need It, and the CSC's web site indicated that its researchers were trained in journalism, philosophy, and Islamic affairs, and include speakers of Arabic, Bengali, Urdu, and other Asian and European languages. The CSC web site indicated that it studied challenges to liberal society, secular democracy, and religious pluralism. The CSC took the position that Islamism represents a threat to social cohesion, and analysed its impact in this context. The Centre published regular reports, produces media releases, held seminars, and explored how best to promote tolerance, civic values, and greater cohesion in Britain.

James Brandon describes his struggles with Douglas Murray at the CSC, which eventually caused the former to leave. According to Brandon, while the CSC seriously addressed the problem of Islamism, it often didn't distinguish between Islamism and Islam. Brandon had to struggle against Murray to ensure only Islamists were targeted and not "Muslims as a whole."

== Media reception ==
The CSC said that it had no political affiliations and aimed to be impartial and non-partisan in carrying out its work. A frequently referenced media source, the CSC was labelled by parts of the media such as the BBC and The Guardian as "right leaning", its research has been described as "controversial" and it attracted criticism from the National Assembly Against Racism, the National Union of Students and the Scottish-Islamic Foundation, whose chief executive Osama Saeed described the CSC, along with the Policy Exchange, as a "right-wing 'stinktank'".

The CSC's findings were more favourably received by other media outlets. Melanie Phillips of The Spectator described the centre as "invaluable", and the Telegraph's Damian Thompson described Douglas Murray as the centre's "brilliant young director" in his Daily Telegraph blog.

== See also ==
- List of UK think tanks
