= Neoconservatism: Why We Need It =

2006 book by Douglas Murray

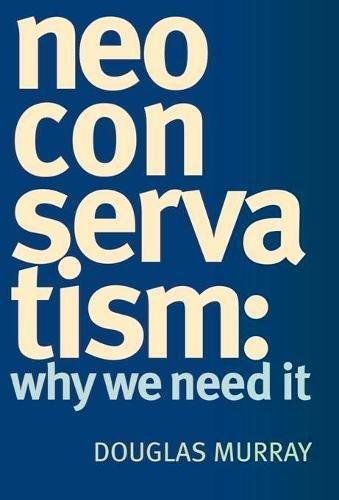
- Cover
- Author: Douglas Murray
- Language: English
- Subject: Conservatism
- Publisher: Encounter Books
- Publication date: 28 August 2006
- Publication place: United Kingdom
- Media type: Print
- Pages: 248
- ISBN: 978-1-59403-147-2
- Preceded by: Bosie: A Biography of Lord Alfred Douglas
- Followed by: Hate on the State: How British libraries encourage Islamic extremism

Neoconservatism: Why We Need It is a 2006 book by Douglas Murray, in which the author argues that neoconservatism offers a coherent platform from which to tackle genocide, dictatorships and human rights abuses in the modern world, that the terms neoconservativism and neocon are often both misunderstood and misrepresented, and that neoconservativism can play a progressive role in the context of modern British politics.

The book was described by the Social Affairs Unit as "a vigorous defence of the most controversial philosophy of politics".

== Background ==
In a 2006 interview, Murray explained that he had written the book

because I was increasingly frustrated that the debate in the West really had reached such a low ebb that most of our terms of definition even, have been lost; I mean the fact that the word 'neocon' which was and is a fairly nuanced term had become simply a term to denote somebody as a warmonger or a kind of ultra-hawk or the far, far right of the Republican party. I want to first of all explain what neocons are and what they aren't ... what neoconservatism is and what it isn't ... to show people really that far from being a sort of awful cult or clique ... that neoconservatives like myself simply believe certain things and view the world in certain ways. I think many, many people share our opinion—it's not hard for people to see that it's not a prejudice to regard democracies and tyrannies as being on different moral planes.

== Synopsis ==
In the book's introduction, Murray writes, "Neoconservatism is not a political party, or social set, but a way of looking at the world. It is a deeply rooted and relevant philosophy which only seems to be out of kilter with modern thought because there is so little modern thought."

The book is divided into four parts: "Neoconservatism in Theory", "Neoconservatism in Practice", "Relativism and the Iraq War", and "Neoconservatism in America".

In 2006, Melanie Phillips summarised the book's main contentions as follows:

- The US political philosopher Leo Strauss's work was distorted for politically motivated reasons, and his influence in creating neoconservatism exaggerated.
- Neoconservatism's defining characteristic is moral clarity and "its recognition of the evils of moral collapse both in the domestic agenda of moral relativism and abroad."
- US foreign policy after 9/11 was not dictated by neoconservatism but brought about a confluence of thinking between neocons and old-style conservatives.
- The vilification of neoconservatism by so-called liberals in Europe and the US derives from desperation that only neocons have coherent policies for tackling genocide, dictatorships and human rights abuses, but the liberals had none.
- Opposition to the Iraq War was fuelled by moral equivalence, hatred of Israel and a media vendetta biased against the West.
- Neoconservatism should offer a way forward for the British Conservative Party, which, in its current state, is the antithesis of the neoconservative ideal.

== Reception ==
At the ConservativeHome website, Jeremy Brier wrote that "His confident and scholarly homage to neoconservatism is both an exhibition of and an argument for moral clarity" and

Murray also reserves some appropriately pointed words for the anti-war brigade: 'Its immoral members openly celebrate violent attacks on western society; its more moral members are simply incapable of coming up with any but the most hollow reasons for why such attacks are wrong'. The way out of this malaise and the denouement of Murray's thesis is not to revert to an old-fashioned conservatism that revels in 'archaism, cliquey anachronism and snobbery' but for Conservatives to embrace neoconservative ideas and become a powerful voice for freedom, liberty and justice. In his final chapter, Murray sets out what a British, neoconservative landscape would look like, including slashed taxes, elite universities and an end to dealings with the European Courts or European Conventions on Human Rights. Most compellingly, he advocates our vital understanding that the UN should not be the 'parliament of the world', a theme which runs through this book.

Brier concludes: "This outstanding short book, always written with wit, elegance and flair, enables one not just to understand better the world in which we live, but to understand with a burning clarity our own duties and responsibilities within it".

Journalist Christopher Hitchens wrote in the Washington Examiner that "The word 'neoconservative' is itself a joke that has gone too far ... Quite plainly, a political faction that advocates the subversion of the status quo cannot reasonably be termed 'conservative' in any sense" but that Murray

writes with energy and wit about the need for a radical Toryism that can transcend the ossified party that now bears the name.

In his native England, the debate that Americans have been having about "the war on terrorism" is in many ways conducted in reverse.

A good bit of the Left, whether pro-Blair or otherwise, is strongly in favor of removing the Taliban and Saddam Hussein and relying on both military and moral force to do so.

While on the Right, a significant part of the old Establishment has given vent to long-buried anti-American instincts, and even blames Blair for attracting or motivating Islamist killers.

This tension offers a huge opportunity for anyone who is capable of thinking for himself.

Of course, the most flagrant offenders against morality and common sense are still the nihilistic pseudo-leftists, who claim to see no real difference between Western democracy and those who desire to murder its voters at random. (Murray selects a fairly renowned academic literary theorist named Terry Eagleton, who wrote that there was no real difference between suicide bombers and those who leaped to their death in flames from the upper floors of the World Trade Center. Neither group, you see, had any real "choice"....)

In a more circumspect review in The Weekly Standard, Peter Berkowitz wrote that Murray's "optimism and boldness, it must be said, sometimes lead him to overstate his case or gloss over difficulties, not least in his estimate of neoconservatism's contemporary appeal" and

In addition to clarifying the connection between relativism and the resentment, envy, and arrogance that characterize so much progressive criticism of the United States and its fight against Muslim extremism, at least two other critical issues must be addressed to fill out Murray's introduction to neoconservatism. First, what lessons from the neoconservative critique of social engineering at home can be applied to the program for promoting liberty and democracy abroad? And second, what steps can be taken to minimize the tensions involved in seeking to conserve liberal democracy, a doctrine and way of life whose guiding principle—individual freedom—constantly struggles against the constraints of tradition, custom, and authority?

== See also ==
- British neoconservatism
