= Henry Jackson Society =

Transatlantic think tank based in London

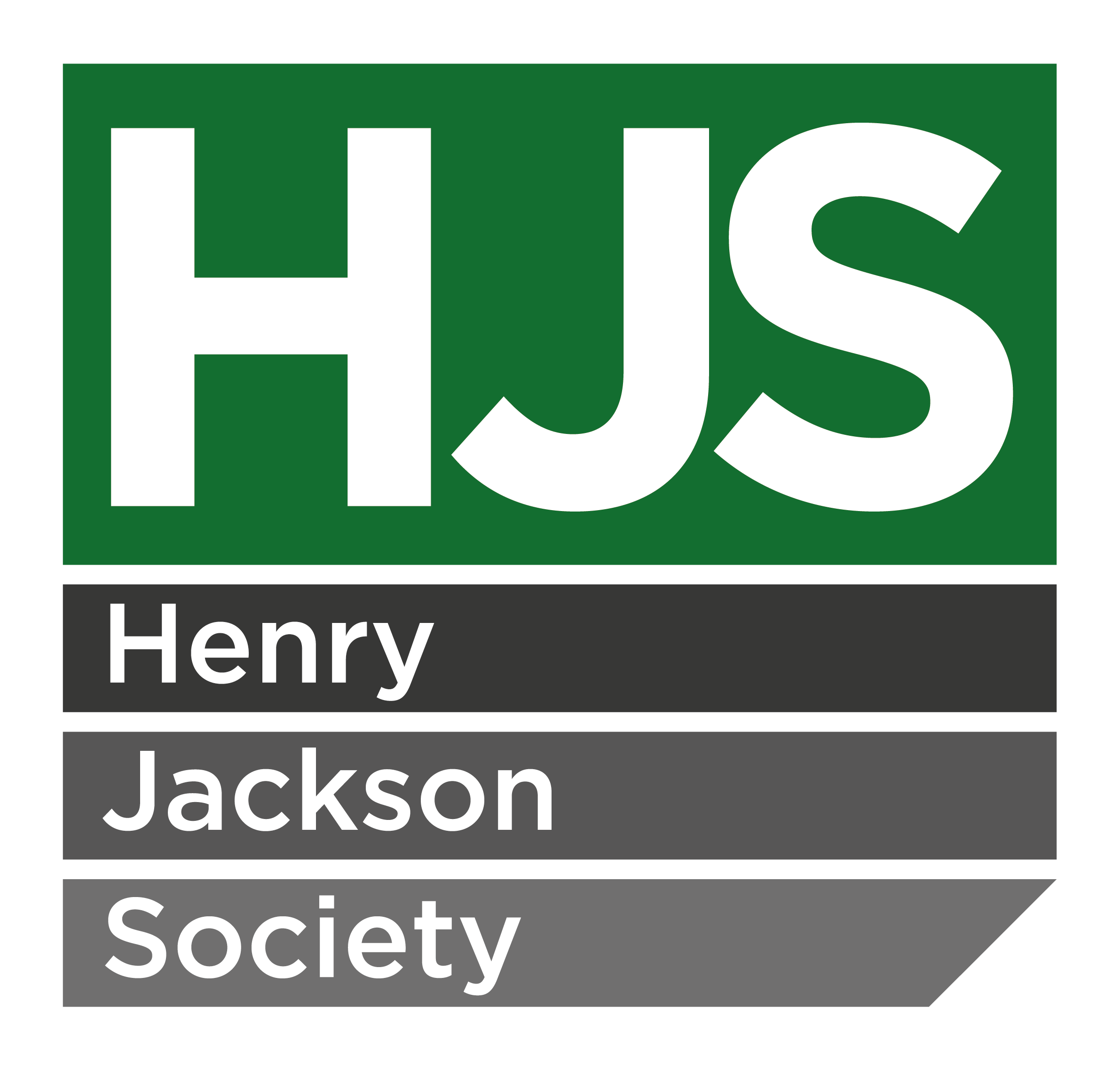
- Abbreviation: HJS
- Formation: 11 March 2005; 21 years ago
- Type: Think tank
- Registration no.: 07465741
- Headquarters: Millbank Tower, London
- Fields: Foreign policy, defence policy, counter-terrorism
- Executive Director: Alan Mendoza
- Revenue: £1.13 million (2025)
- Expenses: £1.18 million (2025)
- Staff: 10 (2025)
- Volunteers: 18 (2025)
- Website: www.henryjacksonsociety.org

The Henry Jackson Society (HJS) is a trans-Atlantic foreign policy and national security think tank, based in the United Kingdom. While describing itself as non-partisan, its outlook has been described variously as right-wing, neoliberal, and neoconservative. The Society is named after 20th century U.S. Senator and Democrat Henry M. Jackson.

The Society identifies itself with a "forward strategy" to spread democracy and liberal values globally including civil rights, environmental concern, and capitalism. It is currently focused primarily on supporting global democracy in the face of threats from the People's Republic of China and Russia. The Society is also known for its reports related to Islamic and far-right extremism.

== History ==
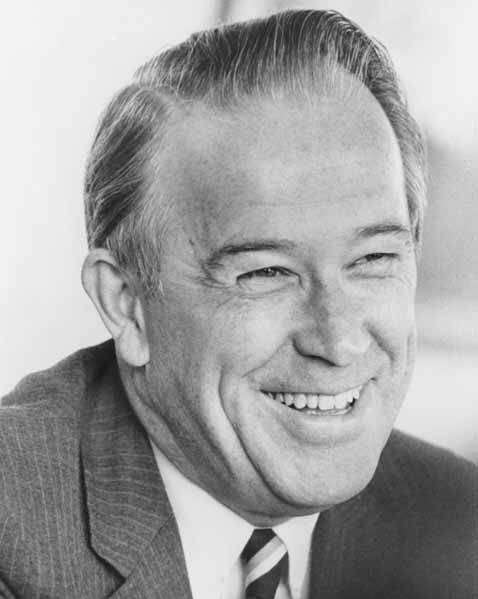
Henry M. Jackson, a Democratic US Senator, after whom the think tank is named

The society was founded on 11 March 2005 by academics and students at Cambridge, including Brendan Simms, Alan Mendoza, Gideon Mailer, James Rogers and Matthew Jamison. It was named after Henry M. Jackson, an American senator (Democratic party) who tried to run in the 1976 United States presidential election. Jackson supported "New Deal" type politics at home and advocated for a strong anti-communist policy abroad. He opposed a detente with the Soviet Union. Jackson was widely respected by Republicans, and thus served as a symbol of bipartisanship. Republicans like Paul Wolfowitz prefer to call themselves a "Jackson Republican" as a substitute for the term neoconservative. It organises meetings with speakers in the House of Commons. By 2017, the society was described as promoting interventionist foreign policy to protect democracy and human rights.

In 2006, the Society worked to raise the profile of the Ahwazi Arabs of Iran, who it claimed were being oppressed by the Iranian government.

In 2011, HJS merged with the Centre for Social Cohesion (CSC), a think tank deemed by some to have anti-Muslim views. Douglas Murray also joined HJS in 2011. Both the merger and Murray's views were opposed by some HJS members like Marko Attila Hoare. Hoare left HJS in 2012, over, what he called, Murray's anti-Muslim and anti-immigration views.

After the merger, individuals who had donated to the CSC, became a significant source of income for the HJS.

In 2013, the president of HJS submitted to the UK Parliament that Britain should consider militarily intervening in conflicts early (as opposed to "last resort") and that intervention "is what we do and who we are".

In 2014, when far right news outlet Breitbart expanded into the UK, its managing editor was Henry Jackson Society member Raheem Kassam.

In 2015, American politician Bobby Jindal spoke at an HJS event alleging that Muslims had established "no-go zones" where they enforce Sharia. (See Bobby Jindal#No-go zones for further information)

Having been founded at the University of Cambridge, the organisation was later moved to London.

In 2017, Hannah Stuart, one of the Society's Research Fellows, released Islamist Terrorism: Analysis of Offences and Attacks in the UK (1998–2015), which profiled every individual convicted under terrorism legislation in the UK between those dates with an Islamist connection.

In June 2020, UK Prime Minister Boris Johnson announced that the UK's Department for International Development would be merged into the Foreign and Commonwealth Office. The plan had first been proposed in a report published by the Henry Jackson Society in 2019, for which Johnson had authored the foreword.

On 19 November 2025, Alan Mendoza, the society's executive director and councillor for Westminster City Council, left the Conservative Party and joined Reform UK, becoming the latter's chief advisor on global affairs.

== Initial ideology ==
The Henry Jackson Society was founded on the belief that Britain needed to take a more active and assertive role on the world stage. It was critical of the Clinton administration for, in HJS' view, not using its military and economic power to change the behavior of others. As the HJS believed that "only modern liberal democratic states are truly legitimate", the HJS was critical of the UN and other multinational organizations that allowed membership to non-"modern liberal democratic" countries. The HJS believed that if EU was to operate militarily, it should be within NATO, as that would allow the US a veto, something a purely EU force would not.

Among the HJS' early members and supporters were Brendan Simms and Conservative MPs Michael Gove and Ed Vaizey. Simms had written a prominent critique of the British policy in Bosnia. Michael Gove had written pro-Israel documents, arguing Israel was legitimate to seize Arab territory. Gove also did not believe that the UK needed UN approval to invade Iraq, given the UK is a democracy while the UNSC gives the veto to non-democratic countries.

In 2006, American political journalist, Michael Allen, described the society as "a non-partisan group that convenes transatlantic center-left, center-right and independent figures committed to Jackson's legacy of 'democratic geopolitics.'"

== Structure and projects ==
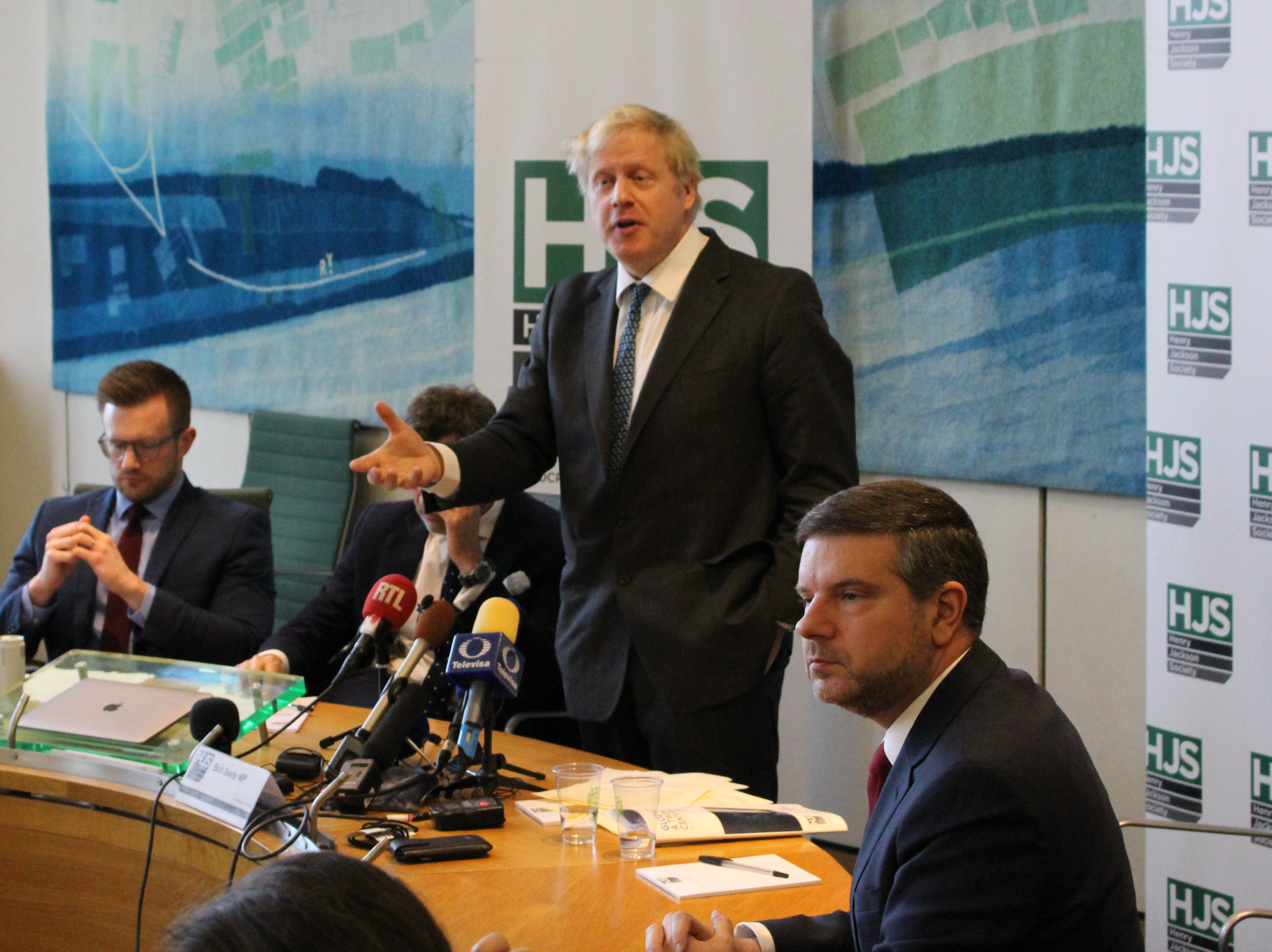
Prime Minister Boris Johnson speaking on Global Britain and foreign aid at the Henry Jackson Society on 11 February 2019

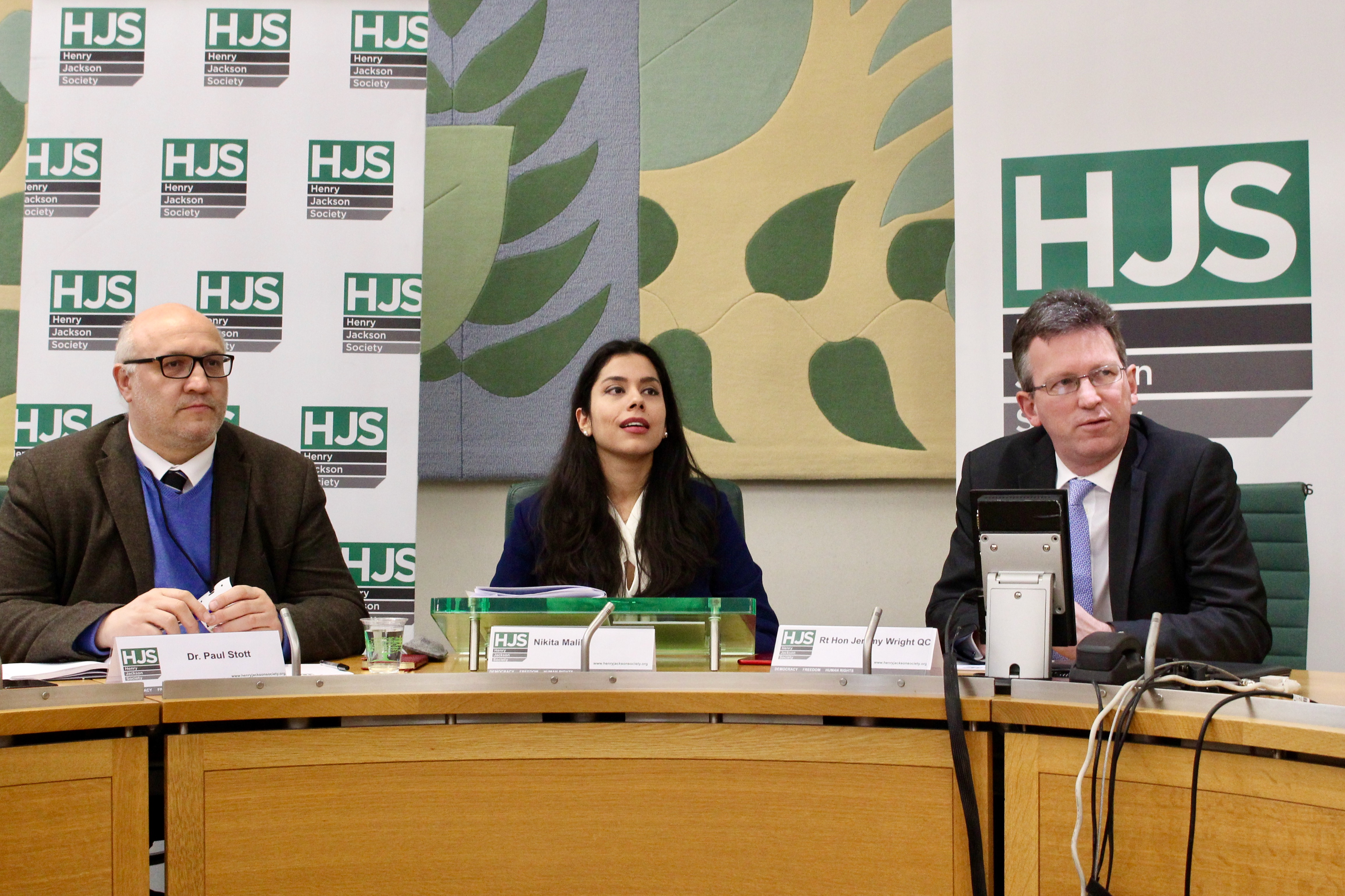
Jeremy Wright speaking at the launch of the society paper "Free to be Extreme" in January 2020 with Nikita Malik and Paul Stott

The society has produced a breadth of research reports and papers, with a recent focus on the impact of COVID-19 on civil liberties, critiques of far-right extremism in western democracies and the possible legal response to China's COVID-19 culpability. Other areas of research include Islamic extremism and Islamist terrorism, crackdowns on human rights and democracy, and various facets of foreign policy and defence. Its current workstreams include:

- Asia Studies Centre. This Centre seeks to provide "an in-depth understanding of the structural shifts, regional complexities and historic tensions that exist alongside the tremendous economic and social growth that traditionally characterise the 'rise of Asia'". Publications include a paper on the possible outcomes of the negotiations with North Korea, and the need to safeguard critical national infrastructure in the West from vulnerabilities which may be built in by China.
- Global Britain Programme. Focuses on "the need for an open, confident and expansive British geostrategic policy in the twenty-first century – drawing on the United Kingdom's unique strengths not only as an advocate for liberalism and national democracy, but also as a custodian of both the European and international orders". This programme has published papers on what the European Union 'owes' the United Kingdom, and has advocated for increased military spending by NATO members.
- Russia & Eurasia Studies Centre. Researches domestic and foreign policy issues in Russia and the former Soviet states. In 2018, the Conservative MP Bob Seely published a paper through this Centre which sought to define 'Contemporary Russian Conflict', and in which he accused the government of Vladimir Putin of pursuing KGB-style tactics.
- Centre for the New Middle East. Established following the Arab Spring, the Society describes this Centre as "dedicated to monitoring political, ideological, and military and security developments across the Middle East and providing informed assessments of their wide-ranging implications". The Centre has released reports highly critical of Iran.
- Centre on Radicalisation & Terrorism. Focuses on the threat to the UK and elsewhere from Islamist terrorism. Reports have ranged from analyses of the UK charitable sector to the way in which criminals utilise the darknet.
- Student Rights. Created in 2009 "as a reaction to increasing political extremism and marginalisation of vulnerable students on campus". This project has tracked what it describes as "extreme" speakers on British university campuses. Nafeez Ahmed accused the project "Student Rights" of having far-right sympathies after the project defended the fascist British National Party.
  - Critics say that "Student Rights" attempted to discredit Muslims groups on campus via misleading claims. For example, Student Rights failed to determine whether the gender segregation at Muslim student events was voluntary or enforced, but instead sought to link it to extremism. In 2014, the National Union of Students condemned Student Rights and said the accused it of "demonising Muslims".
- Centre for Social and Political Risk. In September 2018, the Society announced the creation of a new centre, which would "identify, diagnose and propose solutions to threats to governance in liberal Western democracies", focusing on social cohesion and integration; freedom of speech and political correctness; demographic change; and other issues.
- Henry Jackson Initiative for Inclusive Capitalism. In 2012, the Society started a transatlantic conversation about growing income inequalities and their threat to the capitalist system.

Recent projects by the think tank include studying the discrepancy between jail terms in the UK for Islamic extremists and far-right offenders. The Director of the Centre on Radicalisation and Terrorism found that Islamist extremists are sentenced to "an average 73.4 months compared with 24.5 months for far-right offenders, despite the government's ambition to treat both strains of extremism in the same way".

== Criticism ==
The think tank has been described by The Herald as having right-wing and neoconservative leanings, though it positions itself as non-partisan. It was described in the Australian Financial Review as neoliberal.

Think-tank discussions on the Middle East and Islam have led to some media organisations criticising the Society for a perceived anti-Muslim agenda (Islamophobia). Marko Attila Hoare, a former senior member, cited related reasons for leaving the think tank and Scottish Labour leader Jim Murphy was urged, in 2015, to sever his links with the Society.

According to a report by the Cordoba Foundation in 2015, "right-wing politics is apparent not only in the ideas that the Henry Jackson Society promotes, but also emerges distinctly on examination of its funders".

The Muslim Council of Britain criticised the Society in 2017 for making "oblique references to the usual slurs levelled at Muslims: that Muslims do not integrate, are not part and parcel of British society, and are therefore likely to be terrorists".

Co-founder Matthew Jamison, who now works for YouGov, wrote in 2017 that he was ashamed of his involvement, having never imagined the Henry Jackson Society "would become a far-right, deeply anti-Muslim racist ... propaganda outfit to smear other cultures, religions and ethnic groups". He claimed that "The HJS for many years has relentlessly demonised Muslims and Islam".

In 2020, the society paid damages to the UK Muslim educational channel Huda Television Ltd, having confused it in 2018 with the similarly named Egyptian station, Huda TV, which it accused of a "radical agenda" and hosting Islamic extremist content.

Facebook has partnered with the society and spoken about it publicly. Their spokesperson has said:

Our work with groups like the Henry Jackson Society is critical to helping the industry understand and make progress on these important issues. It is through collaborations like these and with governments, academics, and others companies, through the Global Internet Forum to Counter Terrorism, that we improve our collective ability to prevent terrorists and violent extremists from exploiting digital platforms.

Dr Nafeez Ahmed, executive director of the Institute for Policy Research & Development, criticised the group for hawkishly advocating for regime changes and war-mongering in the Middle East and "hyping up US homeland terror". He wrote in The Guardian that the society's list of international patrons was like reading a list of 'Who's Who' of American right-wing hawks, and alleged that the think tank was behind Tory foreign policy that serves Anglo-American financial, security and fossil fuel interests in the Arab world.

In 2026, the society was declared an undesirable organization in Russia.

== Statement of principles ==
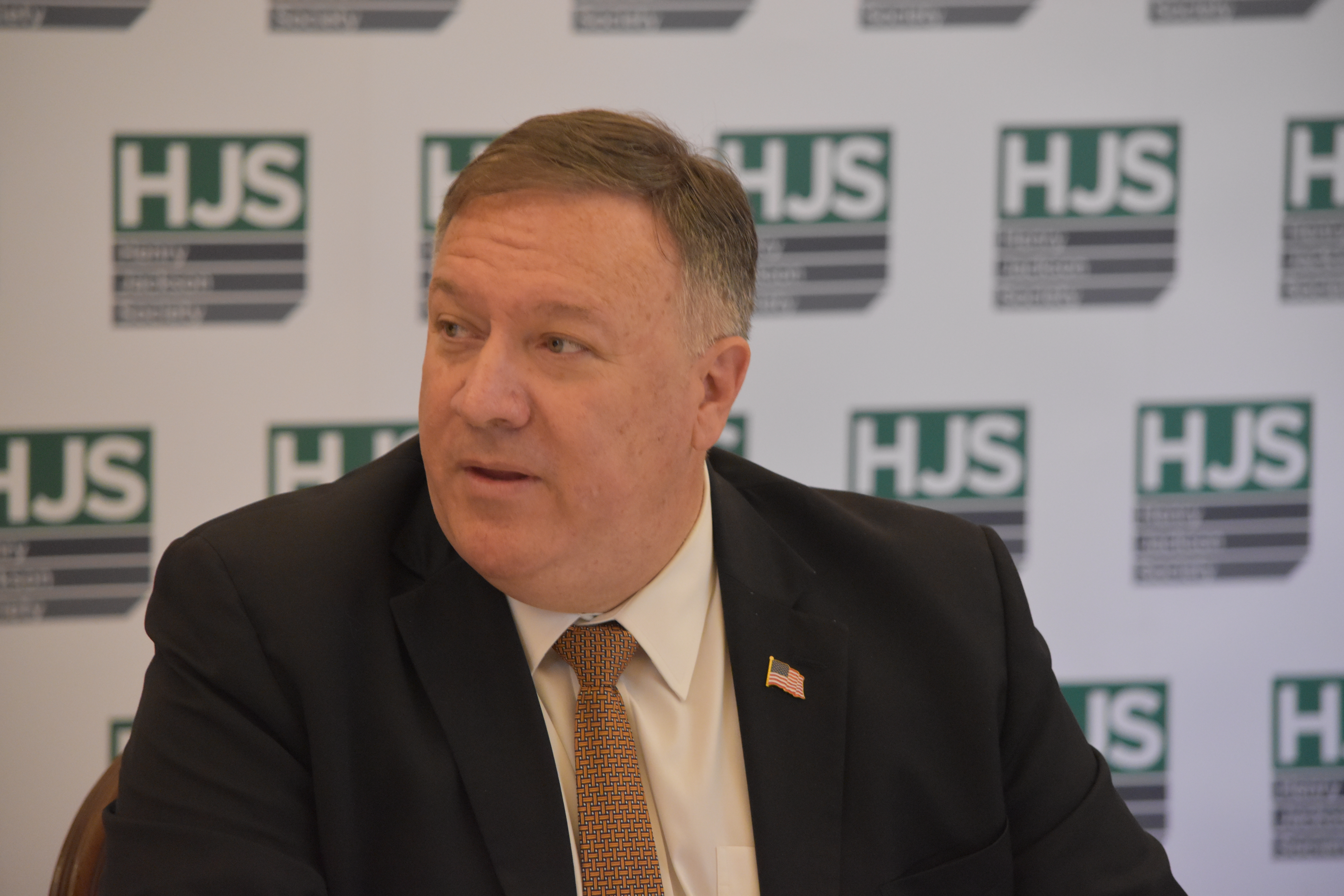
US Secretary of State Mike Pompeo speaking at a Henry Jackson Society event in support of the UK decision to secure data networks, 21 July 2020

The Henry Jackson Society first articulated its statement of principles on 11 March 2005, two years after the Iraq War. Some of the statement of principles were later modified. Both the original and modified versions are given below.

- 1. Believes that modern liberal democracies set an example to which the rest of the world should aspire.
- 2 (original). Supports a 'forward strategy' to assist those countries that are not yet liberal and democratic to become so. This would involve the full spectrum of 'carrot' capacities, be they diplomatic, economic, cultural or political, but also, when necessary, those 'sticks' of the military domain.
- 2 (updated). Supports a 'forward strategy' – involving diplomatic, economic, cultural, and/or political means – to assist those countries that are not yet liberal and democratic to become so.
- 3 (original). Supports the maintenance of a strong military, by the United States, the countries of the European Union and other democratic powers, armed with expeditionary capabilities with a global reach.
- 3 (updated). Supports the maintenance of a strong military, by the United States, the countries of the European Union and other democratic powers, armed with expeditionary capabilities with a global reach, that can protect our homelands from strategic threats, forestall terrorist attacks, and prevent genocide or massive ethnic cleansing.
- 4. Supports the necessary furtherance of European military modernisation and integration under British leadership, preferably within NATO.
- 5. Stresses the importance of unity between the world's great democracies, represented by institutions such as NATO, the European Union and the OECD, amongst many others.
- 6 (original). Believes that only modern liberal democratic states are truly legitimate, and that any international organisation which admits undemocratic states on an equal basis is fundamentally flawed.
- 6 (updated). Believes that only modern liberal democratic states are truly legitimate, and that the political or human rights pronouncements of any international or regional organisation which admits undemocratic states lack the legitimacy to which they would be entitled if all their members were democracies.
- 7. Gives two cheers for capitalism. There are limits to the market, which needs to serve the Democratic Community and should be reconciled to the environment.
- 8. Accepts that we have to set priorities and that sometimes we have to compromise, but insists that we should never lose sight of our fundamental values. This means that alliances with repressive regimes can only be temporary. It also means a strong commitment to individual and civil liberties in democratic states, even and especially when we are under attack.

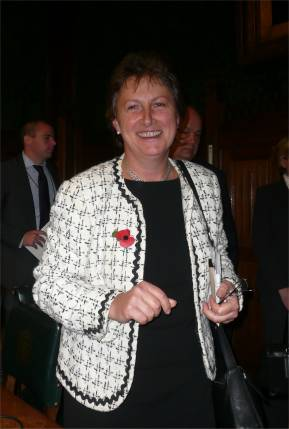
Gisela Stuart, longtime Labour Party MP, is one of the signatories to the Henry Jackson Society statement and has served on its board.

According to the Henry Jackson Society, initial signatories of the statement of principles included:

- Members of Parliament Michael Ancram, Michael Gove, Edward Vaizey, David Willetts, Denis MacShane, Fabian Hamilton, Gisela Stuart
- former MPs David Trimble, Jackie Lawrence, Greg Pope
- former soldier Tim Collins
- Richard Dearlove, former head of the British Secret Intelligence Service, and formerly Master of Pembroke College, Cambridge
- American economist Irwin Stelzer
- Oliver Kamm, journalist at The Times

International patrons included Richard Perle, William Kristol, former CIA Director R. James Woolsey Jr., and former Lithuanian leader Vytautas Landsbergis.

== Funding ==
The Henry Jackson Society is a registered charity in England and Wales and receives financial backing from private donations and grant-making organisations which support its work.

The income of the society increased significantly from 2009 to 2014, from £98,000 to £1.6 million per year. In July 2014 Lynn Forester de Rothschild claimed that she had financed the Caring Capitalism summit and that the society and its executive director Alan Mendoza were holding £137,000 of "surplus funds" from the conference that should be returned to the couple's investment company EL Rothschild, and so moved to civil proceedings. According to the society's 2014 financial statements, the claim was settled in October without an admission of liability. In 2017, The Times wrote that the society was paid £10,000 a month by the Japanese embassy in London to conduct an anti-China propaganda campaign. The campaign was said to be aimed at planting Japan's issues about China in British newspapers The Sunday Times, The Daily Telegraph, The Guardian and The Economist.

The UK Home Office paid the society over £83,000 between 2015 and 2017 to produce a report on UK connections to Islamist terrorism.

In 2009 the society became the secretariat of two all-party parliamentary groups (APPGs), for Transatlantic and International Security, chaired by Gisela Stuart, and for Homeland Security, chaired by Bernard Jenkin. A transparency requirement upon non-profit organisations acting as secretariat at that time was that they must reveal any corporate donors who gave £5,000 or more to the organisation. In 2014, following a query, the society refused to disclose this information and resigned its position, so as to comply with the rules. The Parliamentary Commissioner for Standards, Kathryn Hudson, upheld a complaint against these APPGs, but noted that the society had already resigned, and its non-provision of secretariat services therefore "appears to have taken effect" as the rules intended. The case was closed with no further action taken, and the APPGs themselves dissolved with the dissolution of Parliament in March 2015. The APPG Rules were subsequently changed so that only non-profit organisations providing services to APPGs of more than £12,500 in value need to declare corporate donors.

== Sources ==
- Dodds, Klaus (2008). "Thinking Ahead: David Cameron, the Henry Jackson Society and British Neo-conservatism" (PDF). British Journal of Politics and International Relations. 10 (3): 347–363. doi:10.1111/j.1467-856x.2008.00327.x.
- Griffin, Tom; Aked, Hilary; Miller, David; Marusek, Sarah (2015). The Henry Jackson Society and the degeneration of British neoconservatism: Liberal interventionism, Islamophobia and the 'War on Terror'. University of Bath. ISBN 978-0-9570274-4-2.
