= The Madness of Crowds: Gender, Race and Identity =

2019 book by Douglas Murray

- First edition
- Author: Douglas Murray
- Language: English
- Subjects: Politics, race, LGBT, feminism
- Publisher: Bloomsbury Publishing
- Publication date: 17 September 2019
- Media type: Print (Hardcover and Paperback)
- Pages: 288
- ISBN: 978-1-63557-998-7
- Preceded by: The Strange Death of Europe
- Followed by: The War on the West: How to Prevail in the Age of Unreason
- Text: The Madness of Crowds: Gender, Race and Identity at Internet Archive

The Madness of Crowds: Gender, Race and Identity is a 2019 book by conservative British journalist and political commentator Douglas Murray. It was published in September 2019. The book attracted polarized reviews.

== Thesis ==
The book examines issues of sexual orientation, feminism, race and trans identity. It describes new culture wars playing out in workplaces, universities, schools and homes in the names of social justice, identity politics and intersectionality. The book is an attempt to counter the prevailing views on sexuality, gender, and race. Murray is critical of virtue signaling and other aspects of 21st century progressivism: "How might somebody demonstrate virtue in this new world? By being ‘anti-racist’, clearly. By being an ‘ally’ to LGBT people, obviously. By stressing how ardent your desire is whether you are a man or a woman - to bring down the patriarchy." Murray's book is divided into four main sections which align with different identity groups: "Gay", "Women", "Race" and "Trans", with Murray arguing that modern attitudes to each have been distorted by a sense of victimhood and the negative impact of political correctness.

The book points to what Murray sees as a cultural shift, away from established modes of religion and political ideology, and towards a society in which various forms of victimhood can provide markers of social status. The book is divided into sections dealing with different forms of identity politics, including types of LGBT identity, feminism, and racial politics. The author criticises the work of French philosopher Michel Foucault for what he sees as a reduction of society to a system of power relations.

== Reception ==
The Madness of Crowds received varying reviews from critics. Tim Stanley in The Daily Telegraph praised the book, calling Murray "a superbly perceptive guide through the age of the social justice warrior". Katie Law in the Evening Standard said that Murray "tackled another necessary and provocative subject with wit and bravery". Writing for the Financial Times, Eric Kaufmann said that Murray's book "performs a great service in exposing the excesses of the left-modernist faith".

Conversely, William Davies in The Guardian was highly critical of the book, describing it as "the bizarre fantasies of a rightwing provocateur, blind to oppression." Davies was particularly sceptical of Murray's notion that the social sciences, typified by thinkers like Michel Foucault and Judith Butler, had become dominated by Marxist influences, and noted the irony of Murray championing liberal values while praising the authoritarian Hungarian prime minister Viktor Orbán. Writing in The Times Literary Supplement, Terry Eagleton was also critical, likening the book's polemic to "a history of conservatism which views it almost entirely through the lens of upper-class louts smashing up Oxford restaurants."

Michael Laver on Society characterizes the book as a litany of complaints from an older generation of liberal thinkers against a new generation that is replacing them, in a process Laver regards as natural. According to Laver, rising intolerance is not a characteristic of a left or right outlook, but of the Internet as a venue. He criticises Murray for failing to explore the reasons for this, writing, "The problem, of course, is that to write off your opponents as 'mad,' 'bad' or 'deranged' means giving up any attempt to understand them. And giving up any attempt to understand people who disagree with you means that you will lose the argument."

== See also ==
- Cynical Theories
