= John Eibner =

American human rights activist

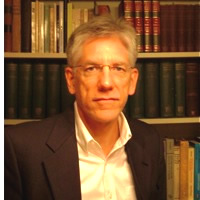

Personal details
- Born: Buffalo, New York
- Education: Barrington College (B.A.); University of London (Ph.D.)
- Occupation: Human rights activist

John Eibner (born June 1952) is an American human rights activist. He was the CEO of Christian Solidarity International-USA until 2021. He was on the board of the American Anti-Slavery Group, and a member of the Institute of Historical Research at the University of London.

== Life and career ==
Eibner was born and raised in upstate New York, but has lived for most of his adult life in Britain and Switzerland. He is married with two daughters.

Eibner received a BA degree in history from Barrington College in Rhode Island, and his Ph.D. in history from the University of London.

From 1986 to 1990, Eibner worked for the Keston Institute in London, an organization that monitored and promoted religious freedom in the former communist countries of Eastern Europe.

In 1990, Eibner joined Christian Solidarity International. During the Karabakh Movement (1988-1991) and the subsequent First Nagorno-Karabakh War of 1992-1994, Eibner led CSI relief expeditions to CSI to Armenians in the blockaded territory of Nagorno-Karabakh, and to Azerbaijanis displaced from their homes in Nagorno-Karabakh.

In 1992, the New Sudan Council of Churches invited Eibner to come to southern Sudan to observe the effect of the Sudanese civil war on Sudan's Christian population. The atrocities Eibner witnessed there, including mass slaughter and slave raiding by government-supported militias, led him to describe the Sudanese government's campaign against the south as "genocide" in an October 1992 article for Wall Street Journal Europe. According to author Richard Cockett, Eibner's article marks the first use of the word "genocide" in connection with modern Sudan.

Under Eibner's leadership, CSI became the first advocacy group on the ground during the Sudanese civil war. Eibner also pioneered the practice of slave redemption, partnering with local Christian and Muslim tribes to retrieve and negotiate for the release of slaves captured by Arab raiders from the north. CSI has documented over 80,000 people who have returned from slavery through this system.

In 2008, Eibner started a campaign called Save Iraqi Christians in order to draw attention to mass violence directed at Iraq's Christian minority. He has traveled to Iraq to deliver supplies to Christian refugees, document cases of anti-Christian violence, and meet with local church leaders.

Eibner has testified before the U.S. House of Representatives, the Subcommittee on Africa, the Congressional Human Rights Caucus and the United Nations Commission on Human Rights. Eibner has briefed senior policymakers at the White House and the State Department about religious persecution abroad, and has led delegations of lawmakers and journalists to critical areas in Sudan and Nagorno-Karabakh.

== Bibliography ==
- In the eye of the Romanian storm: the Heroic Story of Pastor Laszlo Tokes, by Felix Corley and John Eibner, published by Old Tappan, 1990, ISBN 0-8007-5379-8.
- Ethnic cleaning in progress: War in Nagorno-Karabakh, by Caroline Cox and John Eibner, published by the Institute for Religious Minorities in the Islamic World, 1993, ISBN 3-9520345-2-5.
- Christians in Egypt: Church under siege, John Eibner, ed., published by the Institute for Religious Minorities in the Islamic World, 1993, ISBN 3-9520345-1-7.
- The Future of Religious Minorities in the Middle East, John Eibner, ed., published by Rowman & Littlefield, 2017, ISBN 978-1-4985-6196-9
- Chapter on Sudan, Christianity in North Africa and West Asia, Kenneth R. Ross, Mariz Tadros, Todd M. Johnson, eds., 2018, ISBN 978-1-4744-2805-7
