= Hansjürg Stückelberger =

Hansjürg Stückelberger (born 6 December 1930, Schiers) is a Swiss writer and pastor of the Swiss Reformed Church.

He studied theology in Zürich, Basel, Göttingen and Paris and ministered as pastor in several Swiss towns. In the 1970s he organized demonstrations against the persecution of Christians in the Soviet Union. Ten thousands of people attended these silent demonstrations in Zürich and Bern. In 1977 he founded Christian Solidarity International (CSI) and in 2006 Zukunft CH of which he was president until 2018.

Stückelberger's book Europas Aufstieg und Verrat - Eine christliche Deutung der Geschichte (Rise and Betrayal of Europe - a Christian Interpretation of History) appeared in 2011. In 2020 he published the book Freiheit, Demokratie und christliche Werte - Liebe heilt die Gesellschaft (Liberty, Democracy and Christian Values - Love Heals the Society).

He is married and has five children.
