= On Democracies and Death Cults: Israel, Hamas and the Future of the West =

2025 book by Douglas Murray

- Author: Douglas Murray
- Subject: 2023 Hamas attack on Israel, Gaza war, Antisemitism
- Genre: Political journalism
- Publisher: HarperCollins (Broadside Books)
- Publication date: 2025
- Pages: 240

On Democracies and Death Cults is a 2025 book by British journalist Douglas Murray. HarperCollins published the book in the United Kingdom with the subtitle Israel, Hamas and the Future of the West and in the United States with the subtitle Israel and the Future of Civilization. In the book, Murray offers his own response to the October 7 attacks, the international community's reaction to the Gaza war, and what he deems to be Western societies' resurgence of antisemitism. In April 2025, the book debuted on the New York Times Best Sellers list for Hardcover Nonfiction.

== Background ==
The non-Jewish Murray spent several months in Israel after October 7, 2023. There, he interviewed survivors, hostage families, political leaders, military chiefs, and intelligence officials. As part of his research, he visited Gaza embedded with the Israel Defense Forces as well as neighboring countries. Murray's project was his investigation into what the October 7 attack revealed about broader ideologies in Western democracies.

He became known internationally for his advocacy and support of Israel after the October 7 attacks in 2023.

Articles in the academic journals Ethnic and Racial Studies and National Identities associate his views with Islamophobia and he has been described as promoting far-right ideas such as the Eurabia, Great Replacement, and Cultural Marxism conspiracy theories.

== Content ==
The book's first chapter recollects the October 7 attacks with witnesses and survivor testimonies. Murray examines Hamas's ideological foundations, and argues that its embrace of death as a political and religious value stands in fundamental contrast to the values of Western democracies In the book, Murray distinguishes between Hamas and Nazis – he notes that Nazis attempted to hide their crimes against the Jewish people in Europe, whereas Hamas openly celebrates them. He also addresses the historical background to the Israeli–Palestinian conflict when he discusses of the 1967 and 1973 wars, the emergence of Hezbollah in Lebanon, and Iranian influence across the region.

The book also touches upon pro-Palestinian protests in the United Kingdom and on Western university campuses following October 7, which Murray says points to a resurgence of antisemitism in the West.

Murray visited the grave of Baruch Goldstein, the perpetrator of the Cave of the Patriarchs massacre, as part of his investigation into extremism in Israel and the Palestinian territories. He visited a high-security prison to interview individuals involved in the attacks and the perpetrators who committed them.

“to look into the eyes of the people who had been so high on the thrill of death who had demonstrated such ecstasy as they brought it on men, women, and children that morning.”

Murray also recollects various rescue operations during the October 7 attacks, particularly about an individual named Ben Shimoni.

Ben managed to escape the party, taking four other terrified partygoers with him in his car. He drove them to safety in Beersheba, 30 minutes away. Then he headed back to the site of the party. On that trip he managed to save another group of five young people and also took them to safety. Each time, his passengers begged him not to go back into the firefight. But he had a mission. On the third attempt, carrying three more survivors in his car, the terrorists caught him …

His central conclusion is that Israeli soldiers fight out of a love of life, rather than a glorification of violence, and that Western democracies would benefit from a similar perspective.

== Reception ==
The Jerusalem Post described the book as presenting a "clear-eyed, reasoned, and deeply researched view" of the October 7 attacks, praising Murray's access to primary sources and his framing of Hamas ideology. Jewish News praised Murray's historical depth, his dispassion as a non-Jewish commentator, and the power of the survivor testimony he gathered. The book was also praised by U.S. President Donald Trump. In the United Kingdom, it reached the national bestseller list in the Daily Mail. The Spectator lauded it as mapping the historical path to the conflict through first-hand testimony and scholarship.

The Manhattan Institute, at which Murray is a senior fellow, called the book "deeply reasoned, clear-eyed, and grounded in fact," and an "essential read" for those seeking to understand the Israeli-Palestinian conflict.

=== Accuracy ===
In a lengthy review in the Middle East Eye, journalists Peter Oborne and Irfan Chowdhury documented "factual errors, unsourced claims, and misleading framing" throughout the book. Among the errors they identified: Murray incorrectly dated the first large London protest as October 15 when it occurred on October 14, he conflated a separate Hizb ut-Tahrir demonstration with the main Palestine Solidarity Campaign march. Murray also wrote that "two young Muslim girls" who "wore depictions of hang gliders" similar to those that had attacked the Nova party "appeared before a Muslim judge, who let them go without charges". In fact three women, all in their late twenties, were brought before a judge, and were all found guilty of suspicion of supporting a terrorist organisation and each was sentenced to 12-month conditional discharges. The religion of the three women was not established. The review pointed out how irrational it was to claim that they had not been charged, since that is why they were being judged. They further alleged that Murray's claim that up to a dozen UNRWA employees were "found" to have participated in the October 7 attacks overstated the findings of the UN's Office of Internal Oversight Services, who had determined that only nine staff members out of over 30,000 had "possibly" participated. Oborne and Chowdhury had given Murray the chance to comment before publication of their review, he had not replied.

The book also received a negative review by Nathan J. Robinson in Current Affairs, who opined that Murray excludes "every piece of information that undercuts his thesis" and accused him of "spreading outright falsehoods". Robinson criticized Murray for sourcing the quote "Children are tools to be used against Israel. We will sacrifice them for the political support of the world." attributed to Ismail Haniyeh and that Robinson was unable to verify, to an anonymous tweet in the endnotes. He further criticized the book for claiming that the Palestinian Authority had insisted that "no Palestinian state could have Jews in it" without an endnote citation, to which Robinson refuted the claim as being "the opposite of the truth", citing that the Palestinian Declaration of Independence prohibits discrimination on grounds of race or religion, as well as the Fatah Revolutionary Council having two elected Jewish members.

== Sales ==
The book debuted on the New York Times Best Sellers list for the week ending April 12, 2025, appearing on both the Combined Print & E-Book Nonfiction and Hardcover Nonfiction lists.
