= International Christian Concern =

International Christian human rights organization

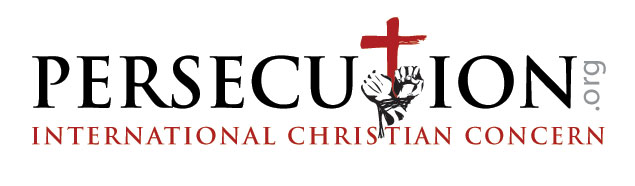
- Abbreviation: ICC
- Formation: 1995
- Type: 501(c)(3)
- Tax ID no.: 52-1942990
- Purpose: Christian based human rights organization
- Location: 2020 Pennsylvania Avenue, NW, Washington DC, USA
- Region served: Worldwide
- President: Shawn Wright
- Revenue: 2,298,138 (2018)
- Website: persecution.org

International Christian Concern (ICC) is an ecumenical, non-governmental, non-partisan Christian organization, located in Washington, DC, whose concern is the human rights of Christians and religious minorities. Its mission is to help religious minorities from all forms of persecution through assistance, advocacy, and awareness.

== History ==
ICC was founded in 1995 by Steve Snyder, former president of the USA Division of Christian Solidarity International to assist persecuted Christians from all denominations who affirm the Apostles' Creed, inclusive of Catholic, Orthodox, and Protestant Christians. In 2002, Snyder was succeeded as ICC President by Jeff King, who had served 11 years with Campus Crusade for Christ.

The organization has issued reports on persecution of Christians in countries such as China, Saudi Arabia, Iraq, and Algeria. In recent years ICC has also worked to raise the profile of religious persecution in Mexico, Pakistan, Egypt, and India along with individual cases such as Sudanese Christian mother Meriam Ibrahim and Pakistani Christian farmhand Asia Bibi.

== Publications ==
ICC offers a free monthly magazine subscription entitled Persecution.

Top stories, videos and original news releases are located on the organization's website.

== See also ==
- Christian Solidarity International, a Christian human rights NGO
- Open Doors, Christian nonprofit organization dedicated to supporting the persecuted church
