= William Davies (political writer) =

English writer, political and sociological theorist

- Born: 1976 (age 48–49)
- Occupation(s): Author, critic

Education
- Education: University of London

Philosophical work
- Main interests: Capitalism, Neoliberalism, Happiness, Expertise, Consumerism
- Notable ideas: "Anti-Philosophical Agnosticism", "The Happiness Industry", "Demedicalization of Psychiatry"
- Website: https://williamdavies.blog/

William Davies (born 1976) is an English writer and political and sociological theorist. His work focuses on the issues of consumerism, happiness, and the history and function of expertise on society. Davies has written for a variety of newspapers and periodicals including The Guardian, New Left Review, London Review of Books, and The Atlantic. In 2015 Davies published his second book The Happiness Industry, which assesses the relationship between consumer capitalism, big data and positive psychology. Davies is Professor of Political Economy at Goldsmiths, University of London, where he is co-director of The Political Economy Research Centre in London.

== Works ==
- The Limits of Neoliberalism: Authority, Sovereignty and the Logic of Competition (2014)
- The Happiness Industry: How Government and Big Business Sold Us Well Being (2015)
- Nervous States: Democracy and the Decline of Reason (2019)
- This is Not Normal: The Collapse of Liberal Britain, Verso Books, 2020 ISBN 978-1-8397-6090-7

== Selected articles ==
- “Leave, and Leave Again”, London Review of Books (2019)
- "What is “neo” about Neoliberalism?", The New Republic (2017)
- "On mental health, the royal family is doing more than our government", The Guardian (2017)
- "The Age of Pain", The New Statesman (2017)
- Davies, William (30 May 2022). "This age of inflation reveals the sickness ailing Britain's economy: rentier capitalism". The Guardian. London, United Kingdom. ISSN 0261-3077.
