= Ian Almond =

Literary scholar

- Born: 1969 (age 56–57); Skipton, North Yorkshire, England

Academic background
- Education: Edinburgh University

Academic work
- Institutions: University of Bari; Erciyes University; Boğaziçi University; Georgia State University

Ian Almond (born 1969) is a literary scholar. He is professor of world literature at Georgetown University School of Foreign Service in Qatar.

== Biography ==
Ian Almond was born in 1969 in Skipton, England. He received his PhD in literature at Edinburgh University, and worked for University of Bari in Italy, Erciyes University and Boğaziçi University in Turkey, Frei University in Germany, and Georgia State University in the US, before coming to Georgetown University School of Foreign Service Qatar in 2013.

Almond specializes in post-colonial theory, South Asian literature, representations of Islam and world literature. His works primarily focus on Islam. He is interested in showing how Islam has been an overlooked factor in the formation of Europe. His book Two Faiths, One Banner: When Muslims Marched with Christians across Europe's Battlegrounds is a history of Muslim-Christian military alliances in Europe.

Almond theorizes in History of Islam in German Thought from Leibniz to Nietzsche that Marx, Hegel, Nietzsche and Kant knew more about Islam than conventionally assumed. In his work on philosophy, he argues that many postmodernists rely on Orientalist tropes in writing about Islam. His works seek to explore the repressed spirituality of allegedly secular authors.

He is the author of five books. His books have been translated into several languages, including Arabic, Turkish, Persian, Korean, Indonesian and Bosnian. The Arabic translation of his book Sufism and Deconstruction was shortlisted among seven other books for the Sheikh Zayed Book Prize.

== Selected publications ==
- Almond, Ian (2004). Sufism and Deconstruction: A Comparative Study of Derrida and Ibn ʻArabi. Routledge. ISBN 9780415320436.
- Almond, Ian (2007). The new Orientalists: postmodern representations of Islam from Foucault to Baudrillard. London: I. B. Tauris. ISBN 978-1-84511-398-8.
- Almond, Ian (2009). Two Faiths, One Banner: When Muslims Marched with Christians Across Europe's Battlegrounds. Harvard University Press. ISBN 9780674061767.
- Almond, Ian (2010). History of Islam in German Thought from Leibniz to Nietzsche. New York: Routledge. ISBN 9780415995191. OCLC 229019549.
- Almond, Ian (2015). The thought of Nirad C. Chaudhuri: Islam, empire, and loss. New York: Cambridge University Press. ISBN 978-1-107-09443-7.
- Almond, Ian (2021). World literature decentered: beyond the "West" through Turkey, Mexico and Bengal. Routledge studies in comparative literature. New York, NY: Routledge. ISBN 978-0-367-68337-5.
