= Israeli–Palestinian conflict in video games =

The Israeli–Palestinian conflict has been the subject of several video games, mainly smaller ones developed by independent studios or individual developers. Some can be categorized as serious games, others as newsgames or educational games. Many have been controversial.

== 1980s-1990s ==
During the First Intifada, a game called Intifada (1989) was released. Players act as an Israeli soldier attempting to disperse a riot by attacking Palestinians with a variety of weapons including rubber bullets and live ammunition. Created by a supporter of the Kach party, the game features Meir Kahane becoming Defense Minister after the game is won. Although the game was criticized by the Education Ministry and liberal Israelis as encouraging violence against Palestinians, it was popular in Israel.

One of the first games dealing with the conflict was the government simulation game Conflict: Middle East Political Simulator, released in 1990 for DOS by Virgin Mastertronic. The game places the player in control of the prime minister of Israel after his predecessor has been assassinated. The main focus of the game was however not the conflict between Israel and Palestine as much as between Israel and its neighboring states.

In 1999, Islamic Fun, a software package including a mini-game where the player fights Israel, was released by a UK company.

== 2000s ==
The 2000s saw the release of several video games exploring the conflict. Under Siege (2005), developed by Syrian company Afkar Media, is a first-person shooter that tells the story of a young Palestinian resisting Israeli occupation during the Second Intifada. Global Conflicts: Palestine (2007), developed by Serious Games Interactive, lets players act as a journalist covering the conflict and was pitched as "a video game to promote peace." PeaceMaker (2007), developed by ImpactGames, is a simulation game that allows players to assume the role of either the Israeli Prime Minister or the Palestinian President. The objective is to achieve a peaceful resolution to the conflict through various political and diplomatic decisions.

Raid Gaza! (2008), a browser-based game by an independent developer, similarly lets the player control the then-PM of Israel, Ehud Olmert, but instead awards the player for killing as many Palestinians as possible. While intended as a satirical critique of the disproportionality of the Israeli response to Palestinian rocket attacks, it sparked debates about the ethics and impact of such representations in video games. The satire was lost on some, such as the Lebanese developers Wixel Studios who created the game Gaza Shield (2009), tasking the player to defend innocent Gazans, in an "enraged" response.

== 2014 Gaza War ==
During the 2014 Gaza War, developers sympathetic to both sides of the conflict released video game apps on the Google Play Store and App Store around the war. The themes and content of the games caused controversy, and several were removed.

=== Pro-Israeli apps ===
A screenshot from Bomb Gaza

Bomb Gaza was an app released on 29 July 2014 and was downloaded between 500 and 1,000 times before being removed for Google Play on 4 August. Its logo was an F16 fighter jet, as used by the Israel Defense Forces, and its description was to "drop bombs and avoid killing civilians". The app's maturity setting was set at low, which made it available to younger users. Bomb Gaza was also playable on Facebook before being removed by 5 August. The site retains a page which describes the game as "very addictive and fun".

Other games on Google Play included Gaza Assault: Code Red, which described itself with "Terrorist cells are launching rockets into your country, do you have what it takes to protect your citizens?", and the player controls an Israeli drone. There was also Whack the Hamas, in which the player fights members of Hamas. Its description was "The Hamasites are coming out of their tunnels! Don't let them escape, otherwise they will hurt innocent civilians!" The game claimed to be "inspired by the operation 'Tzuk Eitan'.", an Israeli name for the conflict, often translated to Operation Protective Edge in English. Both were removed by 5 August.

Iron Dome Missile Defense was released by Simon Rosenzweig on 30 July to Apple's App Store, and involves the player using Israel's Iron Dome to defend a city from an unnamed "enemy". Rosenzweig did not name this "enemy" deliberately, stating "I wish not to see apps that support hate in any way".

=== Pro-Palestinian apps ===
Title screen of Rocket Pride

A series of mobile game apps that sympathize with the Palestinians were released on mobile application storefronts in 2014. Rocket Pride was developed by Best Arabic Games. Its description is "supporting heroes besieged in the Gaza Strip from an oppressive occupier" by "controlling the resistance missiles and hitting the objectives assigned to them" through outmanoeuvring the Iron Dome. The game was removed from Google Play on August 5, 2014. Gaza Hero begins with a screen saying "curse Israel". A gameplay mechanic involved the player tapping Israeli soldiers to turn them into food and medicine. In another game Gaza Defender, the player is expected to shoot down Israeli aircraft.

Liyla and the Shadows of War, a 2016 mobile game developed by Palestinian software engineer Rasheed Abueideh, follows the struggles of a Palestinian family's attempts to survive a series of armed attacks in their neighbourhood. The game aims to raise awareness about the treatment of Palestinian civilians in the Gaza Strip by Israeli security forces. Apple's initial decision to reject the listing of Liyla as a game on the Apple Store in May 2016 generated significant coverage from commentators as well as public outcry, which led to a reversal of their position a week after the original release date of Liyla. In June 2021, the PC version of Liyla became the centerpiece for a charity relief bundle that benefit Palestinian civilians, which was offered by indie game developers on the Itch.io website in response to the 2021 Israel–Palestine crisis.

=== Reaction ===
A Google spokesperson said that although the corporation does not comment on specific apps, it "remove[s] apps from Google Play that violate [their] policies." These policies ban apps that advocate "against groups of people based on their race or ethnic origin", or are threatening.

Amnesty International UK said that the apps were "in highly questionable taste" and that players "should consider closing their war games app and instead read about real life right now in Gaza City, Rafah or indeed in southern Israel."

Chris Doyle, the Director of the Council for Arab-British Understanding said of the games "You can have video games that deal with war, but when you base it in a reality of a conflict that' going on right now it's extremely problematic. It's in very, very poor taste and it doesn't create a culture of peace - and we need to, more than ever before." He added "Google, Facebook or any other company that host such games, should be reviewing their policies and making absolutely all efforts to ensure that such games are not hosted on their platforms."

Morton Klein, president of the Zionist Organization of America, said "It is both deplorable and dangerous to glorify Israelis killing Arabs or Arabs killing Israelis."

== 2023–present Gaza war ==
- Fursan al-Aqsa: The Knights of the Al-Aqsa Mosque (2021), updated in 2023 to allow players to reenact the October 7 attacks from the perspective of a Palestinian militant
- The New York Times Simulator (2024), a satirical newsgame criticizing media coverage of the Gaza war

== See also ==
- Muslim Massacre: The Game of Modern Religious Genocide, an online game where the player kills Muslims for the United States
