= Muslim Massacre =

Muslim Massacre may refer to:

- Muslim Massacre (video game), a controversial 2008 amateur computer game
- The various Moro massacres during the dictatorship of former Philippine President Ferdinand Marcos

== See also ==
- Islamic persecution (disambiguation)
