= Muslim Massacre (video game) =

2008 video game

Muslim Massacre: The Game of Modern Religious Genocide
- Developer: Eric 'Sigvatr' Vaughn
- Platform: Microsoft Windows
- Release: January 2008
- Genre: Shoot 'em up
- Mode: Single-player

Muslim Massacre: The Game of Modern Religious Genocide is a controversial 2008 amateur video game by former Something Awful forum member Eric Vaughn under the screen name "Sigvatr". It is a top-down shoot 'em up video game. The aim of the game is to kill all the Muslims that appear on the screen – in the words of its creator, "take control of the American hero and wipe out the Muslim race with an arsenal of the world's most destructive weapons."

== Overview ==
Muslim Massacre was created by Something Awful forum member Eric "Sigvatr" Vaughn. In describing the game, Vaughn explained the game as "something along the lines of metaphorically destroying the stereotypical depiction of a Muslim." The game had a promotional ad on its front page reading "Don't be a liberal...! Download the game now". Muslim Massacre's gameplay has been likened to Robotron: 2084 and Berzerk as the game's directional controls are operated separately to the direction of fire, allowing the player to move in one direction and fire in another, making techniques such as circle strafing possible. Players control an American soldier armed with a pistol who has been parachuted into the Middle East. The player can also pick up special weapons such as a shotgun, a machinegun, hand grenades and a rocket launcher, supplied by an overflying plane. To progress to the game's bosses, the player must kill all the Muslims who appear on-screen during each stage, each of which lasts between sixty and ninety seconds. Some Muslims are dressed as civilians while others are depicted as stereotypical terrorists wearing a suicide vest.

== Reception and controversy ==
=== Critical reaction ===
PC World's Matt Peckham compared it to the Atari video game Berzerk, commenting that without any meaning to it, it is a parody that feels "utterly devoid of anything remotely Swiftian, and which viewed at the mechanical level is pretty weak, monotonous sauce." He noted that as opposed to banning it, people who do not like it should boycott it, while parents should supervise what their children play. Kotaku's Michael McWhertor called it a straightforward shooter, calling its "visual style and retro 8-bit musical nods" well crafted. He felt that it alluded to shooting games such as Contra and Ikari Warriors, ultimately stating that "it doesn't play particularly well, nor is it a bad game." GameSetWatch's Simon Carless gave it a "resounding 'eh'". The game has been downloaded over 100,000 times as of April 11, 2008.

=== Controversy ===
The game, while being released for some time beforehand, gained controversy around the seventh anniversary of the 2001 September 11 attacks. TechRadar's Adam Hartley said that the game was "vile, childish, tedious and desperate to drum-up-controversy". The chief executive of the Muslim youth organization, The Ramadhan Foundation Mohammed Shafiq commented that "encouraging children and young people in a game to kill Muslims is unacceptable, tasteless and deeply offensive". He also stated that it "incites violence toward Muslims and is trying to justify the killing of innocent Muslims", urging both the British government and Internet providers to shut the website down. Inayat Bunglawala of the Muslim Council of Britain said that Vaughn and the ISPs who host the game should be ashamed, stating that "anti-Muslim prejudice is already on the increase and needs to be challenged and not reinforced through tasteless and offensive stunts like this." Similarly, the president of the Islamic Council of Queensland Suliman Sabdia urged for the website to be shut down by Police Minister Judy Spence, commenting that "this is the sort of game which creates hysteria." Spence was concerned with the game, commenting that the website has been "brought to the attention of police, who are making an assessment as to whether it breaches any legislation." A Queensland Police spokesman announced that the game was examined, where "no offence was detected". They referred the matter to Canadian authorities.

Viewer comments on the website of the Arabic television channel Al Arabiya were mixed; some condemned it, while others viewed it as a reaction to Islamist extremists. The website was blocked in some Arab states. Gulf News' Nicholas Coates erroneously suggested that the game was intentionally released to coincide with both the Islamic month of Ramadan and the attacks of September 11, 2001; in fact, it was released in January earlier that year, and gained increased attention around September. He criticized Vaughn for exacerbating poor Muslim relations, referencing the controversy over the Jyllands-Posten Muhammad cartoons controversy and how Vaughn was making the situation worse. He also bemoaned how ratings boards such as the British Board of Film Classification (BBFC) had no oversight of Internet games. Arab News' Aijaz Afaqui referenced violence in American-made video games and the use of Muslim terrorists as enemies in them, citing this game as an example. In the book Halos and Avatars: Playing Video Games with God, author Craig Detweiler discussed the Under Siege series of video games, which he claims that it is both "anti-Semitic and a promotion of Muslims". He makes reference to Muslim Massacre, saying that games such as it seemed to validate the creation of games like this, suggesting that it was a role reversal in response to anti-Muslim sentiment in video games.

Keyser Trad of the Islamic Friendship Association wrote to Australian Attorney General Robert McClelland expressing outrage, stating that it "teaches young people to 'further hate Muslims' and encourages them to carry out 'acts of discrimination, vilification or outright violence against Australian Muslims'." He added that it violated sedition provisions of counter terrorism laws, as well as other laws that "prevent the incitement of violence against sections of Australian society." The AG responded by saying that it was up to the Australian Federal Police to investigate whether it did so. After contacting them, Trad was told that it was up to the Australian Communications and Media Authority (ACMA), though the Sydney Morning Herald noted that there was not much they could do since it is not hosted on Australian servers. Trad also mentioned other groups he had been "palmed off" to, such as the Queensland Anti-Discrimination Commission and the Human Rights and Equal Opportunity Commission, which he found to take years to investigate claims. He added that he had no faith in the ACMA, citing a case where a radio station had to undergo cultural training, which he found to be ineffectual.

=== Creator's reaction ===
In response to Mohammed Shafiq's assertion that, "When kids spend six hours a day on violent games they are more likely to go outside and commit violence", Eric Vaughn told Sky News: "To Mr. Mohammed Shafiq I would like to say that if a kid spends six hours a day on violent games, I think that they aren't likely to go outside at all, so he should not be worried."

Regarding the game itself, Eric Vaughn called it "fun and funny" and that some players have called it a "critical commentary of U.S. foreign policy." However, he noted that, as quoted by Murad Ahmed of The Times, "I think it's pretending to be legitimate commentary and I'm sure there will be lots of people who defend it on those grounds, but ultimately it's just a game where you blow the gently caress (Something Awful's forum word filter for "fuck") out of Arabs." After the controversy, Vaughn took down the game, leaving an apology and a retrospective on his actions on the website. However, in response to developer of Super Columbine Massacre RPG! developer Danny Ledonne's comments on the matter, he said that his apology was fake, commenting that he was just "fucking with everyone the entire time and have had great success." Ledonne responded by hoping that he was not doing it for "the lulz" like V-Tech Rampage developer Ryan Lambourn, adding that he would define a success as "the opportunity to think more critically about the elements your game addresses." Vaughn claimed that the message was that Muslims needed to "suck it down and stop getting offended by everything", adding that "if they learnt to just ignore people, things would be better." He also noted that it was not just to Muslims, but all people, stating that "there are people all around the world who will do things that make you mad." Vaughn commented that the game's depictions of Muslims was no more negative than television news, adding that he did not feel that children would be affected, and that parents were responsible for instilling positive attitudes in their children.

== See also ==
- Ethnic Cleansing
- Islamic Fun!
- Under Siege
- Persecution of Muslims
- 2014 Israel–Gaza conflict in video games
