= Mohammed Shafiq =

British political commentator

- Born: 25 January 1979 (age 47); Rochdale, Greater Manchester, England
- Occupations: Muslim public figure, political commentator
- Children: 4
- Website: www.mohammedshafiq.net

Mohammed Shafiq (born 25 January 1979) is a British media personality known for his commentary on Islam in the United Kingdom.

Shafiq has spoken out against extremism and terrorism since 2001, condemning the 2007 Glasgow Airport attack. In October 2013, he was warned by anti-terrorist police about death threats being made by the Al-Shabaab terrorist group. In January 2014, he led a campaign in reaction to Maajid Nawaz tweeting an image from the Jesus and Mo cartoon. He was criticised by many in the media and social media as whipping up hatred against Nawaz.

== Career ==
=== Ramadhan Foundation ===
In August 2005, he became press spokesman of the Ramadhan Foundation, a group aimed at helping young Muslims in the United Kingdom and fostering interfaith dialogue. Whilst representing the Foundation, he has become a regular face in British media, commenting on British-Muslim issues and perspectives.

=== Muslim Unity Convention ===
Shafiq was the project manager for the first Muslim Unity Convention, held in the aftermath of the 7/7 attacks in 2005 at the Bridgewater Hall in Manchester. He was a member of the organising committee of the second International Muslim Unity Convention held in October 2009 in Kuala Lumpur, Malaysia.

== Media ==
Shafiq has appeared regularly on television and radio since 2005, when the newly elected Pope, Benedict XVI made a controversial speech in Germany, and Shafiq appeared on Sky News and BBC News 24 to discuss the issue. Shafiq was a senior presenter and head of News and Politics on Ummah Channel and presents various shows including the Debate Night show and is also the main English-speaking presenter. Shafiq also regularly reviews the newspapers on Stephen Nolan's weekend late night show on Fridays at midnight on BBC Radio 5 Live along with former Conservative MP Jerry Hayes.

He has been accused by MEP Daniel Hannan of being a "rent a quote" beloved of journalists for his controversial views,

=== Rochdale sex trafficking case ===
In interviews and in published articles regarding the Rochdale sex trafficking gang, Shafiq has made controversial statements regarding members of the Pakistani community who had been involved in grooming girls, blaming them for harbouring a racist attitude towards white girls. He observed there was an over representation of Pakistani men convicted of child sexual exploitation and on-street gang grooming in which the majority of victims are white.

=== Al-Shabaab threats ===
In October 2013, Shafiq was alerted by anti-terrorist police that he, as well as a number of other prominent Muslim figures in the UK, had been specifically mentioned in a propaganda video created by Al-Shabaab, the terrorist group responsible for the attack on the Westgate shopping mall in Kenya. The video attacked Shafiq and others for "selling out" and had urged jihadists in the UK to take action, citing the murder of Lee Rigby as an example to follow. Shafiq was later offered special protection by the police.

== Political affiliation ==
Shafiq was a member of the Labour Party for two months in 1997 but resigned when the government introduced tuition fees against the promises before the election. He joined the Liberal Democrats. In February 2008, he was asked to resign as vice-chairman of Rochdale Liberal Democrats, following comments he posted online under the name "Deeplish Lad", accusing a colleague of racism and using "tricks from the BNP handbook" – a move said by Lib Dem sources to be "the final straw". He returned to the Labour Party in 2015. In 2026, Shafiq was elected onto Rochdale Borough Council for the Milkstone and Deeplish ward, representing The Workers Party of Britain.

== Personal life ==
He was born to parents from Pakistan. Shafiq attended Springhill High School in Rochdale and Bury College. He is married, having four daughters.

== Controversies ==
=== Maajid Nawaz Controversy ===
In January 2014 Liberal Democrat parliamentary candidate Maajid Nawaz, a secular Muslim, posted a "Jesus and Mo" image on his Twitter account. The image depicts Jesus saying "Hey" and Mohammed saying "How ya doin". Shafiq then posted on Twitter "We will notify all Muslim organisations in the UK of his despicable behavior and also notify Islamic countries." Shafiq further Tweeted "Ghustaki Rasool Quilliam," linking Nawaz's anti-extremist think tank with an Urdu term which means "defamer of the prophet". Maajid Nawaz has since received a number of death threats. Shafiq also reportedly organized an on-line petition to Nick Clegg to have Nawaz removed as a Liberal Democrat candidate, though when the organizers of the petition, named as SA et al., were contacted by the press they distanced themselves from Shafiq. The online petition asking Clegg to suspend Nawaz eventually had 22,927 supporters, a counter petition calling for Clegg to discipline Shafiq received 8,375 supporters.
