= Dreams on a Pillow =

Upcoming 2026 video game

- Developer: Rasheed Abueideh
- Publisher: Rasheed Abueideh
- Platform: Windows
- Release: Q4 2026
- Genre: Stealth
- Mode: Single-player

Dreams on a Pillow is an upcoming 2.5D stealth game developed by Rasheed Abueideh. It follows Omm, a woman attempting flee from her home in Palestine to Lebanon during the Nakba. The game is scheduled to release in late 2026 on Windows, with console releases planned in the future.

== Setting ==
Inspired by Palestinian folk tale, Dreams on a Pillow is set in 1948 during the Nakba. After the killing of her husband by a zionist militia in al-Tantura, Omm runs home to get her newborn son, but in the panic mistakenly picks up a pillow instead. She flees to Lebanon with the pillow, having becomes emotionally attached to it. During gameplay, Omm experiences hallucinations when not holding the pillow but is unable to perform certain actions while holding it. Each level, Omm enters a dream state portraying her childhood in pre-Nakba Palestine. The gameplay takes place in a 2.5D perspective and uses color to contrast a vibrant pre-Nakba environment and a grayscale post-Nakba environment. Events portrayed in the game include the Tantura massacre, Atlit concentration camp, the Fall of Haifa, and the poisoning of Acre.

== Development ==
Developer Rasheed Abueideh is based in Nablus, and released Liyla and the Shadows of War in 2016. Despite support for the game, he struggled to find funding partners to develop future games, and opened a nut roastery in the West Bank. His roastery shut down due to attacks by Israeli settlers making travel to the roastery unsafe, leading Abueideh to return to video game development. He announced the game in November 2024 through crowdfunding platform LaunchGood. According to Abueideh, other crowdfunding platforms had refused his project. By the end of November 2024, it had raised US$49,000. The campaign reached its fundraising goal of US$200,000 in January 2025 and closed its campaign after raising US$244,000. The game received support from Palestinian Voices in Games, an international professional support network for Palestinian game developers launched in September 2025. The network helped secure additional resources and recruit volunteer artists and animators to assist in production of the game. A second round of funding is planned before the game's release to raise a total of US$495,000.

Abueideh stated that he aimed to disprove the Zionist phrase "a land without a people for a people without a land" by utilizing historical documentation and imagery. He also aimed to show the psychological and mental impact of the Nakba on civilians. Abueideh stated that the pillow in the game represents the "lost dream of Palestine and also the future dream as well." Inspirations for the game include the depiction of mental health and psychological struggles in Hellblade, the perspective and narrative style of Oxenfree, and the wordless storytelling of Ico.

== Release ==
The game is scheduled to release in late 2026 on Windows, with console releases planned in the future.

== See also ==
- This War of Mine
- Israeli–Palestinian conflict in video games
