= Radical: My Journey out of Islamist Extremism =

2012 memoir by Maajid Nawaz

- First edition book cover
- Author: Maajid Nawaz
- Original title: Radical: My Journey from Islamist Extremism to a Democratic Awakening
- Language: English
- Subject: Islamism, extremism
- Genre: Autobiography
- Publisher: WH Allen
- Publication date: 5 July 2012
- Media type: Print (hardcover, paperback)
- Pages: 296 pp
- ISBN: 9780753540770

Radical: My Journey out of Islamist Extremism is a 2012 memoir by the British activist Maajid Nawaz, who is also a former Islamist. First published in the United Kingdom, the book describes Nawaz's journey "from Muslim extremist to taking tea at Number 10". The United States edition contains a preface for American readers and a new, updated epilogue.

Radical was described by The Daily Telegraph as a "horrifying reflection on modern Britain". It was entered for the 2013 Orwell Prize for political writing of outstanding quality. The book has been translated into the Portuguese language and published by Texto. In 2015, the author announced on Twitter that the book was being translated into the Arabic language.

== Synopsis ==
Born and raised in Essex, England, Nawaz found expression of his rebellious impulses in early life in hip hop, graffiti, and relationships with girls. A crisis of identity and news of a massacre of Muslims in Bosnia led him toward radical Islamist group Hizb ut-Tahrir, which translates as "The Liberation Party". He rose through the ranks of the organisation, and became a rabble-rousing speaker and international recruiter.

Nawaz travelled around the United Kingdom setting up cells and taking part in organisation of the party. While studying Arab in Egypt, he, along with other friends, was arrested by Hosni Mubarak's secret police. There, he faced a five-year prison term, mental torture and solitary confinement. Mixing with different stripes of religious and liberal Muslims, Nawaz underwent an intellectual transformation. There, he sat with Islamists, jihadists, assassins of Anwar Sadat, leaders of Muslim Brotherhood and Hizb ut Tahrir, liberal Muslims, men convicted for homosexuality, and Muslims convicted for leaving Islam.

On his release, Nawaz publicly renounced Islamist ideology and devoted his life to countering the Islamist view of the world. This move cost him his marriage, and fellow activists abandoned him. Other sacrifices include estrangement from his family and his friends, and loss of personal security. He built a network of supporters and colleagues, and started a foundation, named Quilliam, to challenge the rising tide of Islamism worldwide. He makes use of recruitment tactics that he once used in Hizb ut Tahrir to reverse extremism.

== Reception ==
Former British prime minister Tony Blair described it as "a book for our times", and said that such a book could only be written by someone who has lived the experience of going in and out of extremism. Tina Brown, editor-in-chief of Newsweek, termed it one of the essential books to understanding the path to radicalism. According to Ed Husain, a former Islamist and co-founder of Quilliam, this book is more powerful than civilian casualties from United States drone strikes because it helps to suppress the ideas on which terrorism is built. According to Kate Allen, the director of British section of Amnesty International, the book charts a redemptive journey from innocence, to bigotry, to radicalism, and back. Historian Tom Holland admired the book and termed it to be a cross between Homeland and Skins.

About the book, The Daily Telegraph wrote: "Because of its violent, continent-crossing story, this book seems quite out of the ordinary, but in its underlying tone, I find it reassuringly familiar." In its review, the New Humanist wrote: "Nawaz's book is very much a companion piece to Ed Husain's The Islamist (which was published in 2007), in that it is a much-needed insider’s account of Islamic extremism and, as such, it merits the description of "essential reading" for anyone seeking to understand what motivates bright, educated young men to embrace the fascist ideology of Islamism." About the author, The Indian Express wrote: "What a life, what a compelling storyteller. In parts you'll need to remind yourself that what reads like an engrossing, fast-paced, action-packed thriller, a piece of fiction, is in fact a real-life account."

In a critical review, the American online magazine International Policy Digest said that Radical is a "mesmerizing tale of personal struggle" but "does remarkably little to sufficiently articulate a comprehensive remedy to the problem" of Islamism that Nawaz described. Additionally, the review mentioned how the United States version of Radical is devoid of any serious discussion of the role United States foreign policy might have played in fanning Islamist extremism.

== Book events ==
In August 2012, Nawaz presented his story at the Edinburgh International Book Festival. In May 2015, he talked about his journey out of Islamist extremism at the World Affairs Councils of America in Houston. That same month, he talked to Oliver Bullough at the Hay Festival about radical extremism. In July 2015, Nawaz discussed at the Aspen Ideas Festival about his transformation from Essex boy into an Islamist.

== See also ==
- Islam and the Future of Tolerance
