= Islam and the Future of Tolerance =

2015 book by Sam Harris and Maajid Nawaz

- Authors: Maajid Nawaz, Sam Harris
- Language: English
- Subject: Islam
- Publisher: Harvard University Press
- Publication date: October 2015
- Media type: Print (Hardcover)
- Pages: 120 pp
- ISBN: 978-0-674-08870-2
- Preceded by: Waking Up: A Guide to Spirituality Without Religion Radical: My Journey out of Islamist Extremism

Islam and the Future of Tolerance: A Dialogue is a 2015 book collaboration between American author Sam Harris and British activist Maajid Nawaz. The book has been subsequently adapted into a documentary film of the same title.

== Contents ==
The book is in dialogue format, and features an exchange between Harris, an atheist and a critic of religion, and Nawaz, a former Islamist-turned-liberal activist. Harris argues that the doctrines of Islam are dangerous while Nawaz defends Islam by arguing that those dangerous doctrines have been circumvented by the tradition. Nawaz further argues that like any other religion, Islam is open to reform and will find its place in a secular world.

The book is published with the explicit purpose of furthering difficult conversations about Islam without "devolving into bigotry or caricature". The book also explores the differences between the religion of Islam and the ideology of Islamism.

== Reception ==
The Economist, in its review, called it "a short but intensive dialogue" and noted that "at times, Mr Nawaz is disarmingly frank." It goes on to say that Nawaz acknowledges that reformist Muslims like himself are a minority, but he insists that Islamists are also a minority because the majority are conservative Muslims. After speculating on the percentages of political Islamists, liberals, and social conservatives in the Muslim community, and predicting the odds of success of the liberals depending on the support they get from the conservatives, The Economist declares the task a "tall order" and states "no wonder Mr. Harris is politely sceptical."

New Statesman called it "something of a unicorn" and credited the book for discussing "Islamism and jihadism from a historical as well as a philosophical angle, with no trace of sentiment or dogma." Brian Stewart in the National Review also rated it positively, declaring it "provocative and profane" and lauded the authors for "endeavoring to provide a spark".

Publishers Weekly also gave it a positive review, noting that "Harris, maintaining his provocative persona, asks questions and tosses ultimatums in the direction of Nawaz, who deftly replies with well-reasoned and thoughtful responses that will inform and inspire." According to cognitive scientist Steven Pinker, "This honest and intelligent dialogue is a superb exploration of the intellectual and moral issues involved." In the New York Journal of Books, Tara Sonenshine wrote, "The answer, they [Nawaz and Harris] seem to suggest, may rest in the ancient art of conversation, which this book offers." She concluded that Islam and the Future of Tolerance "may not change hearts or minds, but it will provoke thought and discussion—and that is a contribution."

In a pre-published review, Kirkus Reviews wrote, "A wider range of viewpoints might have made this discussion even more valuable, but readers with a knee-jerk opinion of Islam will learn a lot." Reviewing for The New York Times, Canadian author Irshad Manji wrote, "Their back-and-forth clarifies multiple confusions that plague the public conversation about Islam." She writes, "Harris is right that liberals must end their silence about the religious motives behind much Islamist terror. At the same time, he ought to call out another double standard that feeds the liberal reflex to excuse Islamists: Atheists do not make nearly enough noise about hatred toward Muslims."

== Film ==
January 2017 film teaser featuring Sam Harris on liberal Muslims

A documentary of the same title, which focuses on dialogues between Harris and Nawaz, and includes interviews with Douglas Murray and Ayaan Hirsi Ali, was released on 11 December 2018.

== See also ==
- Criticism of Islamism
- Criticism of Islam
- The End of Faith (2004)
- Radical: My Journey out of Islamist Extremism (2012)
- Heretic: Why Islam Needs A Reformation Now (2015)
