= Usama Hasan =

British Muslim activist

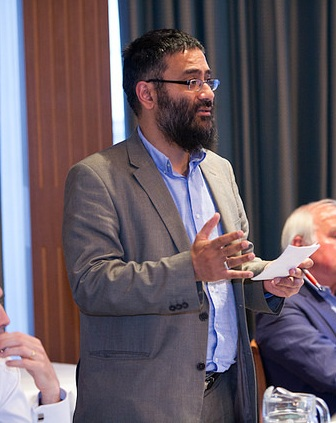
- Hasan speaking at Army and Navy Club, Saint James, London
- Born: 26 October 1971 (age 54); London, England, UK
- Citizenship: British
- Occupation: Commentator
- Organization: Quilliam

Religious life
- Movement: Liberal progressivism
- Website: unity1.wordpress.com

Usama Hasan is a British Senior Analyst at the Tony Blair Institute for Global Change and has described himself as a "a full-time counter-extremism practitioner since 2012". He was also a senior researcher in Islamic Studies at the Quilliam Foundation until it was closed down in April 2021. He is a former senior lecturer in business information systems at Middlesex University, and a Fellow of the Royal Astronomical Society.

== Career ==
Hasan who comes from an Indo-Pakistani family holds no formal qualifications in Islamic Studies or Arabic language from any Islamic university but states he was taught personally by his father, Suhaib Hasan, who is a Saudi Arabia-trained Islamic scholar, while his grandfather, Abdul-Ghaffar Hasan Al-Hindi (d. 2007), was a scholar as well, having taught at the Islamic University of Medina at the request of the influential Salafi scholar Al-Albani.

=== Jihadist claims ===
He has claimed that he fought in Afghanistan against the Soviet occupation.

=== Quilliam Foundation ===
Hasan was Senior Researcher at the Quilliam Foundation, whose activities have been heavily criticised by commentators and academics for their "deplorable work towards the institutionalisation of Islamophobia and the destruction of civil liberties...and the far-right thugs that they have empowered as well as legitimised through their work". During this time Hasan was involved in talks with Tommy Robinson of the English Defence League in which context he stated that "Robinson has always been against Islamism — political Islam — rather than Muslims".

=== British government counter-extremism agenda ===
Hasan was a member of the United Kingdom's Foreign and Commonwealth Office's Projecting British Muslims delegations to Egypt in 2008 and to Afghanistan (Helmand) in 2010, was a Keynote Speaker at the Anglo-Syrian government-sponsored conference "The Message of Peace in Islam" in Damascus in 2009, and is a Patron of both the Forum for the Discussion of Israel and Palestine (FODIP) and Friends of the Bereaved Families Forum. Usama was also a speaker at the Google Ideas/Council on Foreign Relations Summit Against Violent Extremism (Dublin, 2011).

=== Media appearances ===
He has appeared on television programmes, including BBC Hardtalk, CNN, and has also written various columns for The Guardian and The Washington Post.

== Views and controversies ==
Hasan has expressed a number of views on Islam which have provoked strong reactions among Muslims and others.

=== Evolution ===
Hasan has previously argued in favour of a compatibility between Islam and human evolution, arguing the mention of Adam and Eve in the Quran is purely symbolic.

Hasan has argued that Islam is compatible with the theory of evolution, describing the story of Adam and Eve as "children's madrasa-level understanding" of human origins while pointing to antecedents of the modern theory of evolution among medieval Muslim philosophers like Ibn Khaldun (d.1406) and Ibn Miskawayh (d.1030). His lectures have been disrupted by hecklers and has reportedly received death threats.

Hasan later retracted some of his views on evolution. Several British Muslim writers, including Inayat Bunglawala and Yahya Birt, backed his right to free speech. On 5 January 2013, he was featured in a debate against Yasir Qadhi titled Have Muslims Misunderstood Evolution?, in which he argued in favor of human evolution.

=== Power struggles at the Masjid al-Tawhid ===
Hasan complained to British state authorities about "extremism" at the London Masjid al-Tawhid mosque and, in May 2012, as part of the arbitration process, he and all other trustees voluntarily stepped down from their positions as Trustees of the mosque. In June 2012, the new Trustees of the Trust changed the locks of the Mosque doors and employed security guards. According to the website of the Masjid al-Tawhid, the Hasan family "want to ... regain personal control of the mosque" and the vice chair Mehmud Patel said that "the mosque has 'effectively been run as a family affair, not a charity' by Usama Hasan and his father Suhaib Usama, and conflict as a result of the trustees' attempts to move away from this model of operation was inevitable".

=== Al-Shabaab video threat ===
In October 2013 Hasan was alerted by anti-terrorist police that he and other Muslim figures in the UK who had spoken out against Islamist extremism had been targeted by a propaganda video created by Al-Shabaab, the terrorist group responsible for the attack on the Westgate shopping mall in Kenya.

=== Fatwa against ISIS ===
In 2014 Hasan and others issued a fatwa condemning British Muslims fighting for the "oppressive and tyrannical" Islamic State of Iraq and the Levant. Their fatwa "religiously prohibites" would-be British jihadists from joining the Islamic State and orders all Muslims to oppose ISIL's "poisonous ideology".

=== Summer fasting times ===
Hasan believes that Muslims in the UK should fast shorter hours – rather than the dawn-to-sunset hours that most Muslims do – as summer days at such latitudes can run for up to 19 hours.

=== Tony Blair Institute for Global Change ===
Hasan's reports for the Tony Blair Institute with the foreword by Michael Nazir-Ali have been criticized by Salaam as "hegemonic project to save the Muslim world from itself and coax it towards 'a model of Muslim civil religion that mirrors the United States'...it is a repackaging of Neo-Con wisdom 16-years on".
