= Islamic persecution =

Islamic persecution may refer to:

- Persecution of Muslims
- Persecution by Muslims

== See also ==
- Muslim Massacre (disambiguation)
