= Liyla and the Shadows of War =

2016 video game

- Developer: Rasheed Abueideh
- Publisher: Rasheed Abueideh
- Platforms: Android; iOS; Windows
- Release: May 18, 2016: Android; WW: May 18, 2016 iOS; WW: May 22, 2016 Windows; WW: June 3, 2021
- Genre: Platform game
- Mode: Single-player

Liyla and the Shadows of War is a 2016 freeware video game released for mobile platforms and Windows. It follows the struggles of a Palestinian family's attempts to survive a series of armed attacks in their neighbourhood. Inspired by actual events which took place during a specific phase of the Israeli–Palestinian conflict, the 2014 Gaza War, the game aims to raise awareness about the treatment of Palestinian civilians in the Gaza Strip by Israeli security forces. It was created by Rasheed Abueideh.

Apple's controversial decision to reject the listing of Liyla as a game on the Apple Store in May 2016 generated significant coverage from commentators as well as public outcry, which led to a reversal of their initial position a week after the original release date of Liyla. In June 2021, the PC version of Liyla became the centerpiece for a charity relief bundle that benefit Palestinian civilians, which was offered by indie game developers on the Itch.io website in response to the 2021 Israel–Palestine crisis.

== Gameplay ==
Liyla and the Shadows of War is a video game which combines gameplay elements from the platformer and "choose your own adventure" genres. It follows a Palestinian man who attempts to return to his family and help guide them to safety. The game takes place at night, in shadows, as the player character attempts to avoid drones and missiles which indiscriminately target defenseless civilians. The game does not contain music and is accompanied only by ambient environmental noises, or explosions and gunfire. The player character may jump and interact with certain objects in order to progress through each level. The player is occasionally presented with branching narrative choices, although choosing not to move on at the first opportunity results in a swift death for the protagonist's daughter Liyla and consequently a game over scenario. For the game's last scene, the only option given to players is to let Liyla travel with an ambulance, which is destroyed by a missile shortly after it disembarks.

== Development and release ==
"Palestinians in the mainstream media are always dehumanized. Their personal stories are not covered, they ignore that we exist, that we have feelings, that we are living under attack, and that we don't have rights as everyone else in the world. I tried to make something to break that."

— Rasheed Abueideh

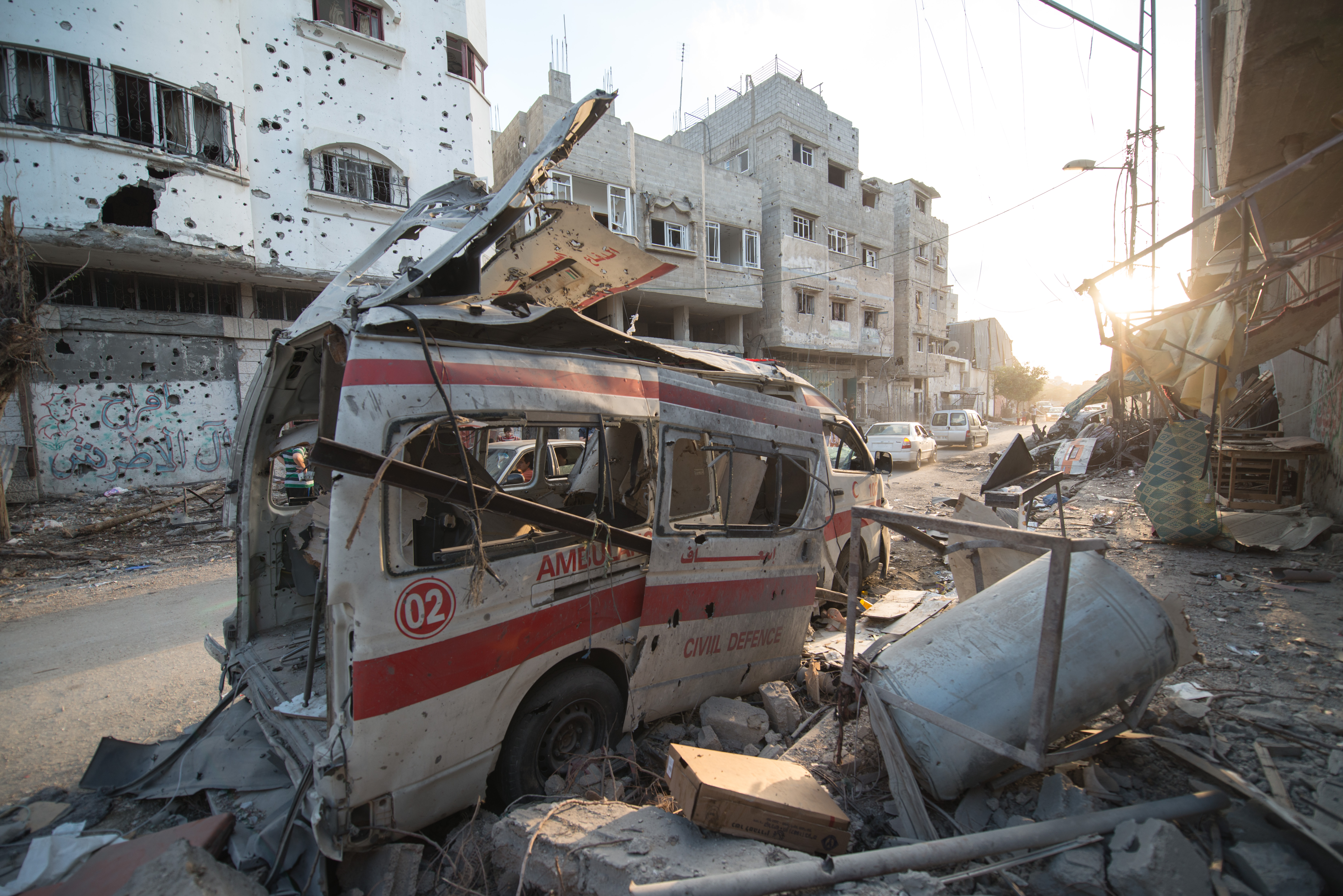
The remains of an ambulance vehicle in the Gaza Strip, destroyed during the 2014 Gaza War. The story of Liyla is based on actual events that occurred during the conflict.

Liyla and the Shadows of War is created by Rasheed Abueideh, a Palestinian software engineer based in the West Bank city of Nablus. The art style and gameplay of Limbo and certain story beats from The Last of Us served as major influences for Liyla. Abuedieh was inspired to develop a video game about the 2014 Gaza War after witnessing a series of ground bombardments and air strikes conducted by Israeli forces against Palestinian settlements in the region. He was particularly moved by a picture he saw of a father carrying the body of his dead daughter, which became the basis of Liyla as he was concerned about his inability to protect his family in the event that they become embroiled in an armed conflict. Abueideh wanted the bleakness of Liyla's final fate to convey the sense of hopelessness and helplessness experienced by many Palestinian survivors in the face of indiscriminate violence committed against them throughout the Israeli–Palestinian conflict, such as the 2014 Israeli shelling of UNRWA Gaza shelters.

Abueideh started his work in secrecy, and took care not to share anything on his social media platforms out of concern for his personal safety. He eventually assembled a team of three people including himself, who were all located in different countries. Each team member voluntarily developed the game in their spare time outside of their full time occupations. Abueideh and his team spent about two years working on the game, during which he had to read extensively about the events of the 2014 Gaza War and repeatedly watch footage of the war. Abueideh was primarily responsible for designing the game and writing its code, while the other team members managed the game's animations and illustration work respectively. Development for Liyla was co-funded by Suomalaiset Nettikasinot, a Finnish online casino company.

Liyla was scheduled to be simultaneously released on the Apple Store and Google Play Store in May 18, 2016. The iOS version was delayed after Apple initially rejected the listing of Liyla as a "game" on the Apple Store due to its politically-charged content. Abueideh received a request from Apple asking him to recategorize Lilya as an app under News or Reference as opposed to Games. This meant the removal of all references to Liyla being a "game" out of its descriptive text. By May 22, 2016, Apple reversed its controversial position not to allow Liyla into the App store or have it listed as a Game. The Android version of Liyla launched on the Google Play Store without any issues.

The PC version of Liyla was released on June 3, 2021, and was featured as the centerpiece for Itch.io’s Palestinian Aid bundle organize by indie game developers Alanna Linayre and Rami Ismail. Launched that same month and offering over one thousand games, the bundle raised over $900,000 US dollars for the United Nations Relief and Works Agency in Gaza by the time it concluded its one week run.

== Controversy and reception ==
Jared Nelson from Touch Arcade and David Rudin from Killscreen criticized Apple's initial position of rejecting Liyla as a game. Nelson speculated that it is due to the fact that Abueideh chose to depict the actual events he had experienced as opposed to a fictional government or events. After analyzing the flaws of the Apple Store's policy on perceived political content, Rudin determined that the perceived "demand to not be too political" is unreasonable and rejected the notion that "humans who make games or the characters who figure in games" could be reduced to being apolitical in order to conform to standards imposed by entities like Apple. Matt Kamen highlighted the perceived double standards practiced by Apple as Israeli Heroes, a pro-Israel mobile game patterned after popular title Angry Birds which feature cartoon missiles, had been categorized as a game on the Apple Store since October 2013. Abueideh attributed the resultant public outcry after he decided to disclose on social media Apple's explanation behind their rejection of Liyla as instrumental in the reversal of Apple's prior position, though he expressed surprise at the level of support he had received for the game.

Liyla secured over a dozen nominations and special awards throughout 2016. In November 2016, Liyla won the Excellence in Storytelling award at the first International Mobile Gaming Awards for the Middle East and North Africa. Brandon Boatman from Hardcore Gamer spotlighted Liyla for its attempt to deliver a message about the grim reality of war faced by Palestinian civilians. While he felt that the "major unfortunate drawback" of Liyla is its exceedingly short length, he praised the game's for its "impressive job of packing quite a few elements" into its gameplay and narrative. In light of renewed hostilities and the escalation of violence during the 2021 Israel–Palestine crisis, Wired staff found that Liyla is "more relevant than ever", and cited its lasting cultural impact with examples like its pivotal role as part of Itch.io's Palestinian relief initiative.

== See also ==
- Israeli–Palestinian conflict in video games
- Dreams on a Pillow
