= Ed Husain =

British Bangladeshi writer (born 1974)

Professor Edmund “Ed” (Mohamed) Husain
- Born: Mohamed Husain; 25 December 1974 (age 51); London, England
- Citizenship: British
- Occupations: Senior Fellow at the Council on Foreign Relations and Professor at Georgetown University Co-founder of counter-terrorism think tank Quilliam Foundation,
- Known for: Expertise on the Middle East

Academic background
- Education: MA Middle Eastern Studies, PhD Philosophy in Western Philosophy and Islam, University of Buckingham
- Alma mater: SOAS, University of London, University of Damascus; University of Buckingham
- Doctoral advisor: Sir Roger Scruton
- Website: https://gufaculty360.georgetown.edu/s/contact/0031Q00002OtBvlQAF/edmund-mohamed-mahbub-husain

Edmund “Ed” (Mohamed) Husain (born 25 December 1974) is a British author based in the US, co-founder of the counter-extremism think tank Quilliam Foundation, Professor at Georgetown University's School of Foreign Service, Adjunct Professor of International and Public Affairs at Columbia University, and Senior Fellow at the Council on Foreign Relations (CFR). As a political advisor he has worked with leaders and governments across the world. Husain's work at CFR focuses primarily on U.S. foreign policy towards the Middle East generally, and specifically at the intersection of Arab-Israeli relations after the Abraham Accords, the geopolitical interplay of Arab Gulf states, China-Muslim world dynamics, and Islamist terrorism. At Columbia and Georgetown Universities, he teaches classes on global security, Arab-Israeli peace, Race, Religion, and Terrorism, and the shared intellectual roots of the West and Islam.

He was previously a senior fellow and director of the Atlantic Council’s N7 Initiative which is focused on peace in the Middle East and broadening and strengthening relationships between Israel and its Arab and Muslim neighbours. He has held senior fellowships at think tanks in London and New York, including at the Council on Foreign Relations (CFR) at the height of the Arab uprisings (2010–2015). While at CFR, his policy innovation memo led to the US-led creation of a Geneva-based global fund to help counter terrorism: the Global Community Engagement and Resilience Fund (GCERF). GCERF continues to combat terrorism-inspiring ideologies around the world. He is also a member of the editorial board of the Studies in Conflict & Terrorism, a monthly peer-reviewed academic journal covering research on terrorism and insurgency.

Husain was a senior advisor at the Tony Blair Institute for Global Change. From 2018 to 2021, he completed his doctoral studies on Western philosophy and Islam under the direction of the English philosopher Sir Roger Scruton. He is the author of The Islamist (Penguin, 2007), The House of Islam: A Global History (Bloomsbury, 2018), and Among the Mosques (Bloomsbury, 2021). His writing has been shortlisted for the George Orwell Prize. A regular contributor to Spectator Magazine, he has appeared on the BBC and CNN and has written for the Telegraph, The Times, the New York Times, the Guardian and other publications.

== Early life ==
A native of London's East End, Husain was born to a Saudi Arabian mother and Bengali Muslim father who was a descendant of the saint Shah Jalal from the Hadramout region of Yemen. Husain’s father migrated from India to England in 1957. In his first book, The Islamist, Husain explains that "in ethnic terms [he] considers himself Indian", adding that in his family line there is "Arab ancestry; some say from Yemen and others the Hijaz." Today, Husain maintains familial connection to Arabia as his maternal cousins teach Hadith literature to students and worshippers in the Prophet Mohamed’s Mosque in Medina, Saudi Arabia.

== Education ==
Husain has a BA in history from the University of London, and later studied at SOAS, University of London, where he completed an MA in Middle Eastern Studies under Professor Gerald Hawting and Professor Charles Tripp. He also spent two years studying at the University of Damascus in Syria.

His doctoral research on The Common Intellectual Inheritance of Islam and the West was under the supervision of Sir Roger Scruton at The University of Buckingham. While many interpret Scruton as anti-Muslim, Husain saw Scruton as a friend of classical Islam.

== Career ==
After completing his undergraduate degree, Husain worked for HSBC in London for several years. He then moved to Damascus, where he worked for the British Council teaching English whilst studying Arabic at the University of Damascus. After two years in Syria, Husain and his wife moved to Jeddah to be closer to the Muslim holy sites of Mecca and Medina while continuing to work for the British Council.

Upon his return to Britain, Husain co-founded a think tank, the Quilliam Foundation, with Maajid Usman Nawaz. The aim of the organisation was to "challenge extremist narratives while advocating pluralistic, democratic alternatives that are consistent with universal human rights standards" and to stand "for religious freedom, equality, human rights and democracy". Husain then worked as a senior advisor at the Tony Blair Institute for Global Change.

Husain later joined the Council on Foreign Relations in New York, where he was Senior Fellow in Middle Eastern Studies. He focused on trends within Arab Islamism, perceptions of the West in the Arab world, and US policy toward the Middle East, writing broadly on the Arab Spring and its implications for the region and foreign involvement.

He was appointed to the Freedom of Religion or Belief Advisory Group of the British Foreign and Commonwealth Office in 2014.

In 2017, Husain joined the Wilson Center as a Global Fellow in its Middle East Program. He was a Senior Fellow at Civitas: Institute for the Study of Civil Society in London, where he ran the 'Islam, the West, and Geopolitics' research project.

Husain was appointed as a professor in the Walsh School of Foreign Service in Georgetown University in 2021 and a senior fellow and director of the Atlantic Council’s N7 Initiative in 2023.

== Views ==
While at the Council on Foreign Relations, Husain commented on U.S. policy on issues ranging from the 2011 U.S. congressional hearings on radicalization spearheaded by Rep. Peter King (R-NY) to the events of the Arab Spring and the death of Osama bin Laden. Since joining Civitas, Husain has commented on Islam and society, the British political system, the prospect of a Middle East Federation, and the role of Saudi Arabia in the geopolitics of Islam.

In an article in the Spectator at the end of 2019, Husain highlighted shifting alliances in the Middle East and the possibility of a new Arab-Israeli alliance. It was discussed widely in the region.

He has appeared on CNN, Fox, NPR, BBC, Al-Jazeera, and has been published in the New York Times, Financial Times, Guardian, National Review, Spectator, Telegraph and Jewish Chronicle, among other media outlets.

=== Islam and society ===
Husain supports a liberal interpretation of Islamic jurisprudence, telling one journalist:

In traditional circles, Muslim women are not allowed to marry non-Muslim men...But in a pluralistic world in 2007, where non-Muslim men and Muslim women are marrying, you can't say, 'You can’t do that.'

Husain also questions teachings relating to an Islamic state or Caliphate, arguing:

... a dawlah ([a state] not 'the' state) can and should preserve and protect the religion. But 'the state' is not a rukn [pillar] of the deen (religion i.e. Islam) and without it the deen is not lost. An individual can remain a firm believer, a mutadayyin, without the imam and the jama'ah.

He believes that Islam is fully compatible with Western democratic society, stating that the Quran does not teach a compulsion to faith or the murder of unbelievers. Husain has espoused this view in numerous commentaries, articles, and books, stating:

… the lived reality of Islam as a religion of compassion, pluralism, coexistence, and peace is a far cry from how it is perceived by many in the West.

The raison d’être of Islamic civilisations and the shariah for a thousand years was to provide five things: security, worship, preservation of the family, nourishment of the intellect and protection of property. These are called maqasid, or the higher objectives of the shariah. Britain provides these in multitudes for every Muslim today.

Husain has also urged Muslims in the West to respond to the challenge of Islamic extremism. In an article in the Evening Standard, he stated that:

Too often in Britain, in the name of freedom we provide protection for this murderous mindset. This mix of political ideology and puritan theology leads to the global curse of Salafi-Jihadism. We must stop protecting it...Most victims of Salafi-Jihadism are ordinary Muslims. In Britain, teachers, imams, politicians, social workers and families must not protect intolerance, but reject it.

=== Middle East Federation ===
Husain has called for a federal union of Middle Eastern states along the lines of the European Union in order to defeat religious sectarianism in the region and promote economic and political cooperation.

He writes:

After all, most of its problems – terrorism, poverty, unemployment, sectarianism, refugee crises, water shortages – require regional answers. No country can solve its problems on its own.

=== Saudi Arabia ===
Husain was a noted critic of Saudi Arabia's human rights abuses and role in promoting Islamist extremism worldwide.

He has, however, spoken against isolating Saudi Arabia politically, arguing that the rise of Iranian theocracy in the Middle East requires ever closer alliances between the west and its Arab allies. After appointment of Saudi Prince Mohammed bin Salman, Husain has written in favour of western, and specifically British, support for his early steps towards reform in order to 'shape the future of a global shift towards peace and co-existence' between the Middle East and the West.

Husain now views Saudi Arabia’s role as central to global Muslim leadership, arguing that 2 billion Muslims face the direction of Mecca.

=== Bahrain ===
In an op-ed for the New York Times in 2012, Husain analysed the political unrest in Bahrain in the wake of the Arab Spring after a visit to the reforming Crown Prince Salman bin Hamad bin Isa al-Khalifa. Noting the strong influence of the pro-Iranian anti-democracy cleric Ayatollah Issa Qasim on the Shiite opposition party Al Wefaq (which blocked bills for women's rights and equality that were supported by both the monarchy and Sunni parties), Husain urged the West not to "provide diplomatic cover for rioters and clerics in the name of human rights and democracy".

He called Bahrain a "focal point of what is happening in the Middle East today – the battle to find a balance between preserving the best values of the Islamic tradition while the region eases its way into the modern world."

=== Israel and Palestine ===
Husain supports a two-state solution to end the Israel-Palestinian conflict. He has condemned the suicide bombing of Israeli civilians as well as the killing of Palestinian civilians by the Hamas-led Gazan government, and also what he referred to as the Zionist terrorism of the Stern gang and others.

He has expressed opposition to the international boycott of Israel by activists, stating in 2013 in The New York Times:

Many people condemn Israeli settlements and call for an economic boycott of their produce, but I saw that it was Arab builders, plumbers, taxi drivers and other workers who maintained Israeli lifestyles. Separatism in the Holy Land has not worked and it is time to end it. How much longer will we punish Palestinians to create a free Palestine?

Writing for the Wall Street Journal in 2023, he explained why the Abraham Accords were central to an America-led security architecture between its allies. Husain encouraged the U.S. to "build on the Abraham Accords," arguing in a 2025 Politico article:

As long as mosques, schools, hospitals, universities and charities support the destruction of Israel and death to Jews, the U.S. cannot empower a terror base that gave us Oct. 7 and promises of more such attacks. Nations like Indonesia, Brunei and Mauritania should thus be brought closer to Israel. Palestine must seek peace under new leadership. And if Egypt and Jordan oppose the idea of evacuating Gaza, they must bring their own plan as to how Hamas and Islamic Jihad will be removed from Gaza and the West Bank.

=== ISIL ===
Husain has sought to explain the theological pull of ISIL in the West through analyses of its fundamentalist ideological interpretations of Islam. He has urged western governments to take on a deeper understanding of its extremist worldview, arguing:

Unless we decimate the theological and ideological appeal of Isis, we will see the rise of an even more radicalised and violent force. Isis offers a caliphate and death. Our message needs to be of life, an Islam of the Muslim majority supported by 1,400 years of history. We must help Arab allies to reform, to create a regional Middle East union that transcends artificial borders, creates economic prosperity and reinstates Arab dignity. Terrorists cannot compete on this stage.

=== U.S. response to the Arab Spring ===
On the Arab Spring, he has said:

The Arab world is no longer across the oceans. It is also on our streets here. Millions of American citizens are of Arab descent. Millions more are here as workers and students. What happens over there matters here. Can America make these people proud and empower them against Muslim extremists by changing the American story and making us all safer? Yes, it can. It must.

Husain advocates American soft power and leadership in modeling democracy. Countering the US response to the Egyptian military's raiding of NGO offices in 2012, he said:

The U.S. government should ask its military allies to return to their barracks and cease killing protesters—and that it should tie these demands to U.S. aid. ... The Arab revolutionaries did not look to China or Russia for a model of government. They looked to four-year presidential terms, inspired directly by American democracy. Islamist leaders such as Tunisia's Mohamed Ghannouchi condemn French secularism but highlight American accommodation of religion as a model of a secular state that is less hostile to religion.

However, Husain argued against U.S. military intervention in Syria, stating:

What happens in Syria does not stay in Syria. ... U.S. military intervention in Syria would likely see traditional state actors backing rival groups (Sunnis and Muslim Brotherhood by Turkey and Saudi Arabia, for example, Shia and Alawites by Iran, Druze and Christians by France, a former colonial master, or even indirectly Israel). Worse, there is a real possibility of the emergence of an al-Qaeda-inspired organization inside Syria to fight "Western imperialism," much like al-Qaeda or the "Sunni insurgency" in Iraq.

=== Al-Qaeda ===
In a May 2011 op-ed in The Times, Husain warned against al-Qaeda's success as a brand:

Without doubt, the US was right to remove bin Laden, but it is wrong to think that his death will weaken al-Qaeda. Yes, a colossal psychological blow has been dealt, but al-Qaeda is no longer a mere organisation, but a global brand, an idea, a philosophy that now has its first Saudi martyr from the holy lands of Islam.

However, Husain criticized the September 2011 extrajudicial killing of American citizen Anwar al-Awlaki, explaining that it is "counterproductive to defeating terrorism in the long term because it demolishes the very values that America stands for: the rule of law and trial by jury." Furthermore, "An easier, cheaper and more effective way of discrediting al-Awlaki and countering his message would have been to disclose his three arrests for the solicitation of prostitutes ..."

=== Syrian Civil War and Transitional Government ===
Husain has warned of the involvement of Al-Qaeda and like minded groups in the Syrian Civil War:

Whether Assad stays or goes, jihadism now has a strong foothold in Syria. The Free Syrian Army may wish to dismiss its al-Qaeda allies as irrelevant in order to reassure the West and continue receiving Western support, but the jihadi websites and footage of al-Qaeda fighting in Damascus and Aleppo tell a different story.

In a February 2025 open letter to Secretary of State Marco Rubio, Husain argued against rescinding the Caesar Act and providing sanctions relief to Syria, claiming:

But while Syria’s new leader may have exchanged his fighting gear for a formal suit and tie, we cannot be so easily fooled. His organization is a designated terror group. Indeed, Ahmad al-Sharaa may claim to have changed his spots, but first, we need answers to important questions: What role will a literalist interpretation of Sharia law play in Syria? Did he support the 9/11 attacks? What are his views on Osama bin Laden? How many Americans did he or his organization kill in Iraq? Does he think Hamas and Islamic Jihad are worthy of Syria’s support? And does he recognize the legitimacy of Israel? We can accept change in politicians — Egypt’s Anwar Sadat and Russia’s Mikhail Gorbachev demonstrated clear evidence of it. Absent answers, we owe no support.

== Publications ==
Husain is author of the books The Islamist (2007), House of Islam (2018) and Among the Mosques (2021).

Among the Mosques (2021), his most recent book, explores ten mosques in Northern Britain, tracing how the mainstreaming of literalist interpretations of Islam has fostered the growth of "parallel" Muslim societies. It was praised by The Economist as "a fascinating addition to the Orwellian tradition". The Sajid Javid, MP, writing in The Times, described the book as a “considered and nuanced… must-read” and Tom Holland, author of Dominion, characterized it as "compelling and moving". However, writing in The Literary Review, reviewer Sameer Rahim, commented: “While his title alludes to V S Naipaul's Among the Believers, Husain is unable to match the novelist’s magisterial prose or penetrating insights. Instead, his book careers painfully from the risible to the frankly sinister." An article in The Standard described it as "A controversial book about Islam that has been accused of not making clear its use of pseudonyms as well as making inaccurate claims."

His previous book, the House of Islam (2018), tracks the misgivings of the modern Salafist movement in petrostates across the Middle East that, in the words of The Times, makes "a plea for the renewal of classical, traditional Islam against its extreme and politicised versions." Justin Marozzi in the Times commented that “The common theme, which runs as a deep undercurrent in this book, is extremist Saudi ideology. In a powerful and impassioned polemic, Husain argues that it has poisoned the Muslim world with its narrow, hateful, literalist and intolerant world-view, eschewing ancient Islamic traditions of tolerance and pluralism. Outward religious practice outweighs the call for inner spiritual refinement. Saudi Arabia, he charges, has essentially killed Islam.”

The Financial Times described Husain's writing as an "eloquent [invection] against the Islamist project of enforcing the Salafist interpretation of Islamic sharia law", David Goodhart in The Times praised Husain for "the combination of deep religious commitment and western reformist politics that makes him such a necessary figure", and Kirkus further commended the book as "a welcome introduction to a faith too little understood by those outside of it."

His first book, The Islamist (2007), was shortlisted for the 2008 George Orwell Prize and 2008 PEN Ackerley Prize. The story follows Husain’s experience as a British youth drawn to Islamic fundamentalism before eventually rejecting the movement and its teachings. As Anushka Asthana wrote in the Guardian, The Islamist is a “captivating, and terrifyingly honest, book” that brings readers into the mind of young fundamentalists serving as a “wake-up call to monocultural Britain.” Melanie Phillips of the Daily Mail praised Husain for his "courage" and "intellectual honesty and guts" in The Islamist, and Martin Amis, in a separate piece for The Times, called it a "persuasive and stimulating book".
