= Raid Gaza! =

2008 video game

- Developer: Marcus Richert
- Release: December 18, 2008
- Genre: Real-time strategy
- Mode: Single-player

Raid Gaza! is a short real-time strategy Flash game by Marcus Richert which satirizes the Israel–Palestine conflict from a pro-Palestinian perspective. The game was uploaded to Newgrounds on December 30, 2009, three days into Israel's Operation Cast Lead, and was also released for Android phones through Google Play. It has been referred to as a newsgame and an "editorial game" by Ian Bogost, and as a "journalistic game" by Piotr Kubinski.

== Gameplay ==
The game puts the player in the shoes of the Israeli Defence Forces, responsible with retaliating against the Gaza Strip after the opening cutscene where a lone, meandering Qassam rocket eventually lands on the Israeli side of the border. The player is bluntly tasked with the mission of killing as many Palestinians as possible by a crudely drawn Ehud Olmert. Once the game starts, the player finds themselves ridiculously overpowered with access to "missiles, Merkava tanks, F15I Eagle fighters, and AH-64 Apache attack helicopters," and access to what amounts to unlimited financial assistance from the United States whenever requested through a simple phone call. The computer-controlled opponent, Gaza, on the other hand, continues to send its lonely Qassam rockets, which only occasionally cause any Israeli deaths. All the while, a muzak version of The Carpenters' "Close to You" plays in the background. On occasion, the player "unlocks" random achievements like "Bonus: Hospital hit!"

While there is no true loss condition, the player is "rewarded" with an approving message from Ben Ehud Olmert if they manage to maintain a ratio of more than 25 dead Palestinians per 1 Israeli casualty.

== Reception ==
Video game academic Ian Bogost called the game "headstrong" and "one-sided" but also remarked he found it editorially effective both as "an opinion text and as game." Tony Fortin of French gaming website Merlanfrit said the game did a better job than the news media of describing the "perfect reality" and injustice of the conflict. Stephen Petrina at the University of British Columbia said that the game "strikingly communicated" the "unpalatable horrors of the Israeli-Palestinian conflict" in a "very real way." Dora Kishinevsky of Israeli business website Calcalist said that regardless of what one thinks of the political viewpoint of the game, one must recognize its "impressive effectiveness" as a work of political art. Others were less forgiving: Mike Fahey of Kotaku said it left him feeling a "bit ill," while Matt Peckham of PC World called it "noisy oversimplification" and "music to the choir" and later included the game on a list of "The 15 Most Offensive Video Games Ever Made". Jonathan V. Last of the conservative The Weekly Standard "confessed" that the game "had an effect quite opposite the intended one" on him.

Among users on sites like Newgrounds, the overall reaction has been described as divided but one of shock, despite the site at the time frequently featuring both pornographic and ultra-violent material. The Jerusalem Post reported that "most [comments on Newgrounds] seemed to support Jerusalem's position." Whether ironically or non-ironically, it was reported that young Israelis actually took a liking to the game.

Raid Gaza! was followed by several other games dealing with the conflict from other independent game developers, such as Save Israel and Gaza Defense Force.
