= Jesus and Mo =

British webcomic

- A sample of the comic Jesus and Mo originally published in November 2006, featuring all four of the recurring characters.
- Author(s): Mohammed Jones
- Website: http://www.jesusandmo.net
- Current status/schedule: Published weekly
- Launch date: 24 November 2005
- Genre(s): Satire

Jesus and Mo is a British webcomic created by an artist using the pseudonym Mohammed Jones. Launched in November 2005, the comic is published on its eponymous website once a week now.

== Set-up ==
The comic is simply drawn, typically using a single image for each face, each of which is duplicated for each panel in the strip. It features two present-day religious prophets, Jesus and Mo. While Jesus is portrayed as the bona fide Christian Jesus, Mo claims to be a body double, using casuistry to circumvent the Islamic restriction against pictorial depictions of Muhammad.

Jesus and Mo share a flat (and a bed), and occasionally venture outside, principally to a public house, The Cock and Bull, where they drink Guinness and engage in conversation and debate with an atheist female bartender known simply as Barmaid, who is never drawn but is characterised only as an out-of-frame speech bubble. The barmaid functions as the voice of reason when criticising the Abrahamic religions or religion in general. Other times, Jesus or Mo may act as the voice of reason depending on which religion a particular comic aims to criticise. Jesus will act as the author's mouthpiece if the comic aims to criticise Islam while the character Mo will be used to criticise Christianity. They also converse with each other on a park bench.

The Abrahamic prophet Moses appears in some cartoons. The Hindu deity Ganesha made a one-time appearance; both Jesus and Mo mocked his depicted weight and four arms. Joseph Smith, the founder of Mormonism, has also appeared: his face hidden by a hat, a reference to Smith supposedly reading seeing stones by putting them inside a stovepipe hat and sticking his face inside.

In the comic for 24 September 2008, the author used animation (blinking eyes) in the final panel. Starting with the strip released on 10 November 2009, both of the principal figures were redrawn in a somewhat cleaner style.

== Themes ==
The comic consists mainly of religious satire, often criticising arguments for religion, religious texts and decrees and the actions of believers. As the comic centres on Christian and Muslim figures, the satire is generally directed at the two religions, though some critiques apply to many forms of theism.

== In print ==
Episodes from Jesus and Mo have been published in paperback. Strips 1–50 are published in Vol 1 "Where's the soap?" and strips 51–100 in Vol 2 "Transubstantiated". Vol 3 "Things Not Seen" contains strips 101–140, as well as 10 previously unreleased strips. A fourth compendium of 140 strips '"Big Al"' was published in 2008. All print copies are published by Lulu.

The strip is published sporadically in the British magazine The Freethinker. Three strips were printed in the Danish newspaper Information and one in their online version on 2007-03-22.

== Incidents ==
Members of the London School of Economics Atheist, Secularist and Humanist Society were ordered to cover-up their Jesus and Mo T-shirts at the LSE Students' Union Freshers' Fair in October 2013. A new comic was published in response. In December, the University apologised for the incident.

Muslim Liberal Democrat politician Maajid Nawaz tweeted a picture of one of the Jesus and Mo T-shirts, after the cartoon came up in a discussion on a BBC programme The Big Questions. On the programme, the production team stopped participants from being shown wearing T-shirts with the cartoon, which depicted Jesus saying "Hey" and "Mo" saying "How ya doing?" The BBC had feared a hostile response from some Muslims. On Twitter, Nawaz later wrote that he did not find the T-shirts offensive and that he received death threats for this stance.
