= Islamic Fun =

1999 video game

- Main menu
- Developer: Innovative Minds
- Platform: Windows
- Release: 1999

Islamic Fun (also known as Islamic Fun!) is a 1999 religious and educational video game, consisting of six minigames targeted at children. The game was developed by the United Kingdom-based firm Innovative Minds. The game is notable for its minigame "The Resistance," which allowed players to throw rocks at Israeli tanks upon correctly answering trivia. The game's message was supported by Innovative Minds' "Boycott Israel" page and campaign, which aimed to raise awareness about the treatment of Palestinians in Israel.

== Gameplay ==
Islamic Fun is a collection of six mini-games, all of which involve answering a series of multiple choice questions on a range of Islamic themes. Three levels of questions are available, for children of 5–7 years, 8–10 years, and 11 years and older. The mini-games have different themes and stories that progress via correct answers. "The Resistance" depicts the player as a militant in South Lebanon, where answers provide them rocks to throw at retreating Israeli tanks answers. "Building Blocks" involves the construction of a mosque from blocks gained from right answers. The other four mini-games involve helping an animal achieve a certain goal. "Tree Hop" depicts a cat trying to retrieve his ball, "Meow Tiles" has a cat uncovering image, and "Fishing Bear" involves a bear fishing to feed five guests. The game's sole two-player mini-game, "Two Bunny Race", involves two bunny-rabbits attempting to make the finish line first.

== Development ==
The subgenre of religious educational video game usually consists of simple games targeted to a young audience, with uncomplicated plots and goals, and with the main purpose of teaching players about the main principles of that particular faith. While the purpose of such games are religious education, some of the context and ideology behind them, which view certain political events through the value-laden prism of a specific group, may prove to be problematic to other faiths. In creating the game, Innovative Minds was unconcerned with this and instead focused their efforts on designing an educational game with colourful animation and sound effects that would teach players about Islamic [Surah] and ahādīth. Innovative Minds' stated educational goal for the game is to "offer Muslim-inspired children's video games and other resources online in order to strengthen users' knowledge about Islam", including to encourage a better understanding of Islam in the West. In the case of "The Resistance", the game's authors argue that it was "designed to respond to Zionist expansion and aggression".

== Release and aftermath ==
Islamic Fun was released by Innovative Minds, under the direction of Abbas Panjwani, in 1999. It was distributed from his suburban home in Crawley. The game marketed itself as a Muslim alternative to secular video games. The game only became noticed by the Jewish community over three years after being originally produced in December 2001, after Innovative Minds boycotted Israeli goods on their website. The Board of Deputies of British Jews investigated the legal status of the game in the hopes of making it illegal, but were advised by lawyers there is no current legislation to make this possible.

Panjwani noted that as a result of the boycott, his family had received violent threats, abusive phone calls, several hundred hate e-mails a day, and threats against their website's host providers, and commented that "this matter of the game [Islamic Fun] is the latest of a whole series of abuse we have been receiving simply for practising our right to oppose illegal occupation and atrocities committed by the state of Israel". Subsequent to the boycott incident, the game would receive much media attention in the Western World, particularly after the 2005 London commuter terrorist bombings along with other Islamic games.

Game Revolution noted that as of 2013, the games do not function online.

== Critical reception and analysis ==
"Some in the media have kicked up a fuss over this game. It seems that the media is silent when they, the zionists, use their tanks to slaughter our children but when our children play a shoot-em up game where they shoot zionist tanks in return for correct answers we are accused of training terrorists and instilling hatred towards Jews!"

— Innovative Minds on the negative reception to "The Resistance"

The game became controversial due to the perceived anti-Zionism of "The Resistance" game, and for some of the questions themselves, which seemed designed to promote an Islamist world view. It caused critical reactions in the Western media due to the minigame "The Resistance" and the quotations in other puzzle games.

The document Games: A Look at Emerging Trends, Uses, Threats and Opportunities in Influence Activities argued that these types of games "encourage anti-Semitism and promote terrorism". The book "Global Radical Islamist Insurgency" commented that while game lacked the "overtly violent" nature of other Jihadi games, "The Resistance" minigame "seeks to condition youth to consider violence the appropriate emotional response to perceived injustice". The book deemed the other five minigames "child-friendly amusements". Upon reading the description of "The Resistance" Chicago Sun-Times's Zay N. Smith responded "Uh. Oh, never mind", believing that the game showed a "lack of sense in sensitivity".

The Independent thought the game consisted of a series of "simple games" that aimed to teach players about aspects of Islam, and deemed "The Resistance" the game's "standout". In an article entitled The most bizarre religious video games ever, Grunge noted that some of the questions are asked in an "awfully curious way" deeming the game less "fun trivia" and more "shiny, happy propaganda", while commenting that in "The Resistance", "you are now murdering Jews in a supposedly G-rated religious game". Slate thought the title was one of the "War on Terror's least-frightening video games", though noted that the content would appeal to Jihadist gamers. The New York Post deemed the game "sickening" and "shocking", and noted that The Board of Deputies of British Jews had made a concerted effort to pull the self-described "tragedy" from toy stores. In Jihad for Kids : Free Congress Foundation, Robert Spencer wrote that the game “instills ancient Islamic resentments in today’s youth”.

Halos and Avatars: Playing Video Games with God notes that despite the controversial nature of the "flagged" minigame "The Resistance", some of the minigames such as "Fishing Bear" are "nonreligious-oriented". The book noted that several press outlets had cited a potential connection between "Arab-focus warfare games" like "The Resistance" with reports that Al-Qaeda leaders have used similar games to help train terrorists. Furthermore, the book negatively compared the game to Abu Isa's Quest For Knowledge, which used its platform as a tool to impart messages about patience and empathy through practical subjects of religious education. This is in contrast to Islamic Fun, which uses theoretical subjects of religious education, the which playing through a particular scenario teaches reinforces core values. In its opinion, the title, situated within the genre of Islamogaming, crossed the line from religious teaching to ideological instruction.

Game Revolution thought that "The Resistance" has the "kind of radical militant action that paralyzes Americans with fear", and wondered if Western-made warfare games, with foreign antagonists like in the minigame, similarly made Westerners look like "blood-thirsty killing machines, ravenous for death and destruction". Snowden released a document that listed this game as one of the most likely to place the player on a terrorist watch list.

== See also ==
- Islamism
- Under Siege
- Muslim Massacre
