= Quilliam (think tank) =

British counter-extremism think-tank (2008-2021)

- Founded: 2008
- Founder: Ed Husain; Maajid Nawaz; Rashad Zaman Ali
- Dissolved: 2021
- Location: London, England, UK
- Key people: Maajid Nawaz; Rashad Zaman Ali; Haras Rafiq; David Toube
- Employees: 10

Quilliam was a British think tank co-founded in 2008 by Maajid Nawaz that focused on counter-extremism, specifically against Islamism, which it argued represents a desire to impose a given interpretation of Islam on society. Founded as The Quilliam Foundation and based in London, it claimed to lobby government and public institutions for more nuanced policies regarding Islam and on the need for greater democracy in the Muslim world whilst empowering "moderate Muslim" voices. The organisation opposed any Islamist ideology and championed freedom of expression. The critique of Islamist ideology by its founders―Nawaz, Rashad Zaman Ali and Ed Husain―was based, in part, on their personal experiences. Quilliam went into liquidation in 2021.

== History ==
=== 2007: Foundation and terminology ===
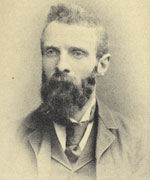
Abdullah Quilliam

Quilliam was established in 2007 by Ed Husain, Maajid Nawaz and Rashad Zaman Ali, three former members of the Islamist group Hizb ut-Tahrir. Husain left in 2011 to join the Council on Foreign Relations in New York. Douglas Murray, who founded the Centre for Social Cohesion (which later morphed into the Henry Jackson Society), stated: "Around the time Ed Husain came to public notice, I recruited him to work with me (through Civitas, the organisation that originally hosted the CSC). He liked my views and I had great hopes for him to become a source for real reform. This gave him the time and financial freedom to set up [Quilliam]."

The organisation was named after Abdullah Quilliam, a 19th-century British convert to Islam who founded Britain's first mosque. The organisation was originally called The Quilliam Foundation, but later rebranded as simply Quilliam.

Quilliam defined Islamism in the following terms:

It is the belief that Islam is a political ideology, as well as a faith. It is a modernist claim that political sovereignty belongs to God, that the Shari'ah should be used as state law, that Muslims form a political rather than a religious bloc around the world and that it is a religious duty for all Muslims to create a political entity that is governed as such. Islamism is a spectrum, with Islamists disagreeing over how they should bring their 'Islamic' state into existence. Some Islamists seek to engage with existing political systems, others reject the existing systems as illegitimate but do so non-violently, and others seek to create an 'Islamic state' through violence. Most Islamists are socially modern but others advocate a more retrograde lifestyle. Islamists often have contempt for Muslim scholars and sages and their traditional institutions; as well as a disdain for non-Islamist Muslims and the West.

Quilliam argued that Islam is a faith, not an ideology, and that "Islam is not Islamism". It also argues that "[Islamists] are extreme because of their rigidity in understanding politics".

The organization's goals were mainly communicated in three ways: through the publication of reports, through involvement with the media, i.e. by taking part in interviews and discussions across Europe and the Middle East, and through its "Outreach and Training" unit, which delivers a "radicalisation awareness programme".

=== 2008: Gaza War ===
On 30 December 2008, just days after the outbreak of the Gaza War, Husain condemned the "ruthless air strikes and economic blockade" of Gaza city by Israel. He predicted that the result would be "rightful support for the beleaguered Palestinian peoples – and a boost to the popularity of Hamas by default".

=== 2010: "Prevent" strategy ===
On 14 June 2010, a strategic briefing paper with a covering letter signed by Nawaz and Hussain was sent to Charles Farr, director of the Office for Security and Counter-Terrorism (OSCT). The briefing paper was intended to be a confidential review of the UK government's anti-terrorism "Prevent" strategy following the 7 July 2005 London bombings, and was "particularly critical of the view that government partnerships with non-violent yet otherwise extreme Islamists were the best way to fend off Jihadism". Although sent "by hard copy alone" with no electronic version, both letter and briefing paper were leaked by being scanned and published on the internet, provoking protests from various groups which had been identified in the Quilliam briefing as sympathetic or supportive of Islamist extremism. According to the briefing document, "The ideology of non-violent Islamists is broadly the same as that of violent Islamists; they disagree only on tactics."

Quilliam's report stated that a unit within Scotland Yard called the Muslim Contact Unit, and a separate independent group called the Muslim Safety Forum, intended to improve the relationship between the police and the Muslim community, were respectively "Islamist-dominated" and "associated with Jamaat e-Islami". Other organisations listed by the Quilliam report included the Muslim Council of Britain and its rival the Muslim Association of Britain, both said to be "associated with the Muslim brotherhood". Also said to have Islamist sympathies or to be associated with Islamist groups were the Islamic Human Rights Commission, the Federation of Student Islamic Societies, the Cordoba Foundation, and the Islam Channel.

The report said of these organisations: "These are a selection of the various groups and institutions active in the UK which are broadly sympathetic to Islamism. Whilst only a small proportion will agree with al-Qaida's tactics, many will agree with their overall goal of creating a single 'Islamic state' which would bring together all Muslims around the world under a single government and then impose on them a single interpretation of sharia as state law." Politicians described by the report as "Islamist-backed" included Salma Yaqoob, then leader of the Respect Party, and George Galloway, also from Respect. Inayat Bunglawala, chairman of Muslims4Uk and a former spokesman for the Muslim Council of Britain, and Fatima Khan, vice-chair of the Muslim Safety Forum, both described Quilliam's list as "McCarthyite". Bunglawala added: "In effect, Quilliam – a body funded very generously by the government through Prevent – are attempting to set themselves up as arbiters of who is and is not an acceptable Muslim."

A Home Office spokesman told the press that the report had not been solicited, but added: "We believe the Prevent programme isn't working as effectively as it could and want a strategy that is effective and properly focused – that is why we are reviewing it."

Nawaz told The Daily Telegraph: "Quilliam has a track record of distinguishing between legal tolerance and civil tolerance – we oppose banning non-violent extremists ... yet we see no reason why tax payers should subsidise them. It is in this context that we wish to raise awareness around Islamism."

=== 2013: English Defence League ===
On 8 October 2013, it was announced that the co-founders of the English Defence League (EDL), Tommy Robinson and Kevin Carroll, had met with Quilliam and intended to leave the EDL. Robinson said that street protests were "no longer effective" and "acknowledged the dangers of far-right extremism". He also said that he intended to continue to combat radical Islamism by forming a new party. Both Robinson and Carroll began taking lessons in Islam from Quilliam member Usama Hasan, and stated their intention to train in lobbying institutions.

In December 2015, Robinson, who founded the anti-Islamic organisation Pegida UK after leading the EDL, said that Quilliam had paid him a total of around £8,000 over a period of six months so they could take credit for his exit from the EDL, although he said that he had already decided to leave the movement before coming into contact with Quilliam. Quilliam said they had paid Robinson as remuneration "for costs associated with outreach that he & Dr Usama Hassan did to Muslim communities after Tommy's departure from the EDL". Quilliam had previously persuaded another member of the EDL, Nick Jode, to leave the EDL. Jode was persuaded by the writings and on-line videos of Maajid Nawaz speaking on behalf of Quilliam, being particularly impressed by Nawaz's debate with Anjem Choudary of the Islamist group Islam4UK.

=== 2016: Dispute with Southern Poverty Law Center ===
In October 2016, the U.S. Southern Poverty Law Center accused Nawaz of being an "anti-Muslim extremist". In June 2018, the SPLC apologised and paid $3.375 million to Nawaz and Quilliam "to fund their work to fight anti-Muslim bigotry and extremism".

=== 2021: Dissolution ===
The Quilliam Foundation Ltd was put into liquidation on 9 April 2021. The same day, Nawaz posted on Twitter: "Due to the hardship of maintaining a non-profit during COVID lockdowns, we took the tough decision to close Quilliam down for good. This was finalised today. A huge thank you to all those who supported us over the years. We are now looking forward to a new post-covid future".

== Funding ==
When Quilliam launched in 2007, the Home Office provided it with £674,608 of funding. In January 2009, The Times published an article stating that Quilliam had received almost £1 million from the British government. The article also said that some "members of the Government and the Opposition" had questioned the wisdom of "relying too heavily on a relatively unknown organisation … to counter extremism".

The government began reducing its funding in 2009 and Quilliam operated at a loss in 2011.

In 2012, the foundation received $75,000 from the Lynde and Harry Bradley Foundation, which funds the David Horowitz Freedom Center. Quilliam also won a grant of over $1 million from the John Templeton Foundation.

The organisation also received £35,000 from banker and BBC chairman, Richard Sharp via his charity, the Sharp Foundation. When asked why he did this, Sharp said he was impressed by Quilliam's "efforts to combat radicalism and extremism".

== Responses ==
=== Tactics ===
According to Alex MacDonald in Middle East Eye, Quilliam was "regularly accused [...] of authoritarianism as well as targeting Muslim groups across the UK and tarring them with the "extremist" label with little evidence." In October 2009, Husain said to The Guardian that he was in favour of Muslims being spied upon by the British state even if they were not suspected of committing crimes. Husain said: "It is gathering intelligence on people not committing terrorist offences. If it is to prevent people getting killed and committing terrorism, it is good and it is right." Douglas Murray described this attitude as 'appallingly illiberal'.

Sayeeda Warsi, the first female Muslim member of a British Cabinet, described Quilliam in her book The Enemy Within (2017) as "a bunch of men whose beards are tame, accents crisp, suits sharp, and who have a message the government wants to hear".

After Quilliam folded in April 2021, Malia Bouattia, former president of the National Union of Students, said that "for 13 years Quilliam reinforced the idea that Muslims are a suspect community and supported the draconian 'counter-terrorism' policies being pushed by the government". She said the foundation "leaves behind a toxic legacy, which will continue to harm the Muslim community in the United Kingdom and beyond".

=== Henry Jackson Society ===
Quilliam worked with the Henry Jackson Society, a neoconservative think tank, and has described Islamophobia as "a crock". In 2006, Murray also called for an end to "all immigration into Europe from Muslim countries".

=== Grooming gangs ===
In December 2017, Quilliam released a report entitled "Group Based Child Sexual Exploitation – Dissecting Grooming Gangs", concluding that 84% of offenders were of South Asian heritage. This report was fiercely criticised for its poor methodology by Ella Cockbain and Waqas Tufail, in their paper "Failing victims, fuelling hate: challenging the harms of the 'Muslim grooming gangs' narrative" which was published in January 2020. In December that year, a further report by the Home Office was released, showing that the majority of CSE gangs were, in fact, composed of white men.

Research has found that group-based child sexual exploitation offenders are most commonly white. Some studies suggest an overrepresentation of black and Asian offenders relative to the demographics of national populations. However, it is not possible to conclude that this is representative of all group-based CSE offending.

– Home Office

Writing in The Guardian, Cockbain and Tufail wrote of the report that "The two-year study by the Home Office makes very clear that there are no grounds for asserting that Muslim or Pakistani-heritage men are disproportionately engaged in such crimes, and, citing our research, it confirmed the unreliability of the Quilliam claim".

=== Focus on Islamism ===
In openDemocracy, Tom Griffin criticised Nawaz for focusing on Islamism, and for defending "counterjihad" figures like Robert Spencer, Pamela Geller and Frank Gaffney.

The emergence of the counterjihad movement had previously been noted in the journal of the Royal United Services Institute as early as 2008. The most comprehensive study of the US counterjihad movement, Fear Inc., by the Center for American Progress, identified its key activists including Frank Gaffney of the Center for Security Policy and David Horowitz of the David Horowitz Freedom Center, both conspiracy theorists who have claimed Hillary Clinton aide Huma Abedin is an agent of the Muslim Brotherhood; as well as Pamela Gellar and Robert Spencer, the co-founders of Stop the Islamization of America. These in turn were funded by a small number of key conservative foundations such as the Donors Capital Fund, the Scaife Foundations, the Lynde and Harry Bradley Foundation and the Abstraction Fund.

== See also ==
- Democracy in the Middle East
- Islamic Modernism

== General and cited references ==
- Nawaz, Maajid; Tom Bromley (2012). Radical. London: W.H. Allen. ISBN 978-0753540770.
