= Fursan al-Aqsa: The Knights of the Al-Aqsa Mosque =

2022 video game

- Developer: Nidal Nijm
- Engine: Unreal Engine 3
- Platform: Microsoft Windows
- Release: April 2022
- Genre: First-person shooter
- Mode: Single-player

Fursan al-Aqsa: The Knights of the Al-Aqsa Mosque (Arabic: فرسان الأقصى, romanized: fursān al-Aqṣā) is a first-person shooter video game developed by Nidal Nijm, an independent Brazilian-Palestinian game developer. The game was first released in April 2022. The game became controversial for allowing players to reenact events such as the October 7 attacks from the perspective of a Palestinian militant.

== Background and overview ==
The game is a first-person shooter set against the backdrop of the Israeli–Palestinian conflict. Its protagonist is Ahmad al-Falastini, a fictional Palestinian militant who was imprisoned by the Israel Defense Forces (IDF) for five years. He embarks on a quest for revenge by joining the Fursan Al-Aqsa resistance group. Both the game and its promotional material prominently include pro-Palestinian political messaging, including the slogan "from the river to the sea".

It was developed by Nidal Nijm, a Brazilian-Palestinian game developer residing in Brazil. Nijm's father was a member of Fatah who immigrated to Brazil after the 1982 Lebanon War. Nijm's father encouraged him to study game development so that he could create a video game that does not depict the West as protagonists and promotes the Palestinian struggle against Israeli oppression.

Nijm developed the game alone over the course of about ten years. He said he intended for the game to "subvert stereotypical representations of Arabs as terrorists" in video games and allow players to take the role of characters he considered freedom fighters. He also wanted to present a Palestinian perspective on the conflict.

== Release ==
A free demo of the game was made available in September 2021 and its release date was scheduled for December 2021. It was given an advisory rating of 18+ by the Brazilian Ministry of Justice. The game went viral because of its portrayal of Palestinian militants killing Israel Defense Forces soldiers. The title was removed from the digital storefront Steam in October 2021, two months before its planned release date. This occurred shortly after the International Legal Forum, an Israeli advocacy group, informed Valve Corporation that the game could violate anti-terrorism laws in the United States. The game was ultimately released in April 2022, and was made available on Steam as of December 2023.

An updated version of the game was released in 2023 which allowed players to reenact the October 7 attacks, as well as other events in the Gaza war. Players could choose to play as a member of Hamas or the Lions' Den militant group. The gameplay involves carrying out suicide bombings, beheadings, and other attacks on Israeli military and police forces. The game received renewed criticism in 2023 both for its depiction of violence against Israelis and because of Nijm's social media posts, which allegedly incited violence against Israeli people and organizations. In an interview with Newsweek, Nijm denied allegations that the game incited violence against Jews or promoted terrorism, claimed it only portrays violence against Israeli military personnel, and stated that he views the Israeli government as terrorists. It has also reportedly been criticized for including music that goes against Islamic principles in its soundtrack.

According to Israeli news site Ynet, the game was not particularly popular despite the controversy and players tended to "quickly abandon the game" after downloading it. Newsweek reported that the game had a peak of 10 concurrent players in October 2023. In October 2024, the game was removed from Steam in the United Kingdom following a request from the Counter-Terrorism Internet Referral Unit.
