= Under Siege (2005 video game) =

- Developer: Afkar Media
- Publisher: Dar al-Fikr
- Designer: Radwan Kasmiya
- Platform: Microsoft Windows
- Release: 2005
- Genre: First-person shooter
- Mode: Single-player

Under Siege (Arabic: تحت الحصار) is a sequel to the video game Under Ash designed by Radwan Kasmiya. Like Under Ash, it is a first-person shooter, with the option of playing the game as a third-person shooter. The game focuses on the lives of a Palestinian family between 1999 and 2002 during the second Intifada. The player shoots at Israeli Defense Force soldiers throughout most of the game. Shooting at civilians or otherwise hurting them ends the game.

== Plot ==
The game begins at the 1994 Cave of the Patriarchs massacre. The player takes on the role of Ahmed, who must incapacitate the shooter Baruch Goldstein, and subsequently fight Israeli forces. The player then takes the role of a 13 year old boy named Mann. Mann steals a flag from the back of a Merkava tank, and is killed by the enraged tank crew.

One year later, Mariam, Ahmed's sister, visits her husband Khaled in prison. She is shocked by the sight of track marks on his arm. She infers from this that the guards have got him hooked on drugs in order to torture him. In order to free her husband, she and Ahmed kidnap an Israeli general. After taking the general to an abandoned building, Ahmed and Mariam are attacked by the Israeli military, and are themselves captured. The player then takes on the role of Khaled, who has been forced to become a spy for Israel in order to escape being tortured in prison. In order to rescue Miriam and Ahmed he interrogates his Shin Bet contact to find out where they are being held, after which Khaled infiltrates Shin Bet's headquarters and frees Ahmed and Miriam. The story then advances to the Battle of Jenin where Ahmed and Khaled are leading the resistance against the Israel Defense Forces attack on the refugee camp.

After Israeli forces break the siege, Khaled is executed in front of Miriam and his son. Miriam takes a hand grenade from a soldier and pulls the pin, committing suicide. On the roof of the building, Ahmed stares at his last bullet.

== See also ==
- Islamic Fun!
