= The Islamist =

2007 book

- Book cover of The Islamist
- Author: Ed Husain
- Language: English
- Subject: Islamism
- Genre: Nonfiction
- Publisher: Penguin Books
- Publication date: May 2007
- Publication place: United Kingdom
- Media type: Print
- Pages: 304
- ISBN: 0-14-103043-7
- OCLC: 78988767
- Dewey Decimal: 320.5/57092 B 22
- LC Class: BP65.G7 H87 2007

The Islamist: Why I Joined Radical Islam in Britain, What I Saw Inside and Why I Left is a 2007 book about Ed Husain's five years as an Islamist. The book has been described as "as much a memoir of personal struggle and inner growth as it is a report on a new type of extremism." Husain describes his book as explaining "the appeal of extremist thought, how fanatics penetrate Muslim communities and the truth behind their agenda of subverting the West and moderate Islam."

== Synopsis ==
The son of Muslim immigrants from Bangladesh and India, living in East London, Husain describes himself as close to his family and their Bengali spiritual guide (pir) he calls 'Grandpa' as a child, but a boffin misfit at the innercity Stepney Green boys secondary school. There he finds some belonging in studying Islam with a friend, Brother Faileek. Their text, Islam: Beliefs and Teachings, by Ghulam Sarwar -- "the first book I read about Islam in English" —tells him that, contrary to his father's teaching, 'religion and politics are one and the same in Islam'. He learns of organizations and people that are dedicated to the creation of 'truly Islamic states' -- Jamaat-e-Islami and its founder Abul Ala Maududi.

At the invitation of Faileek, Husain becomes active in the Young Muslim Organization (YMO) whose parent organization (Islamic Forum Europe) ran the big East London Mosque and was aligned with Jamaat-e-Islami. As an "isolated schoolboy" he is flattered by their attention and impressed with the "dynamism" and "discipline" of the group, but his parents are furious, demanding that he choose between political Islam and the family. Husain runs away from home, coming back only after his father backs down.

Husain goes on to college at the Tower Hamlets College where he is elected president of the Islamic Society—the dominant student organisation on the predominantly South Asian Muslim campus. The Society studies Sayyid Qutb's Milestones, clashes with the secular college administration over the Society's anti-gay stance, its slogan "Islam: the Final Solution", and its demands for a bigger prayer room. The society organizes a successful boycott of the college disco and a Socialist Workers Party speech.

In 1992, the atrocities against fellow Muslims in Bosnia disenchant Husain with YMO and its "parochial" concentration on South Asians. He takes up with a rival group, Hizb ut-Tahrir (HT), impressed with its focus on the international Muslim ummah (community) and its 'methodology for changing the world.'

Along with YMO and HT, other groups -- Islamic Forum Europe, Dawatul Islam, the Wahhabi JIMAS, Hizb ut-tahrir—are all actively preaching in 1990s London that Islam is not just a religion but a complete code of behavior, politics, economics, etc. Not all agree, however, on the exact details of the complete code, or at least who should be in charge, and factional infighting results. In the 1980s, Husain writes, police were called to break up fights between Islamic Forum Europe and Dawatul Islam at East London Mosque. Husain is forced from the Islamic Society presidency by YMO in an acrimonious shouting match, and later forcibly evicted from a mosque while aggressively preaching HT's "concepts". He laments, "I had committed myself to Islamism because I wanted to be a better Muslim, ... not in order to divide Muslims. ... Where was all the brotherhood we spoke about?" Hizb ut-tahri disrupts Muslim events it can't control and in debate would "deny, lie, and deflect" to out-argue its opponents in aggressive style -- "never defend, always offend".

Looking back, Husain also complains of feeling Islamists often misrepresented themselves or important facts. Ghulam Sarwar, was not a scholar of religion but a business management lecturer, and never mentioned in his book his activism in the organization -- Jamaat-e-Islami—he praised. YMO and especially HT use front organisations to hide their activity. After the London 7/7 bombings Husain has lunch with an unnamed "president of a leading Islamist organization in Britain" who in public condemns terrorism, but with Husain lets "slip that he considered that he saw nothing wrong in the destruction of the kuffar (unbelievers), or prayers that call for that destruction." Husain also feels politics are crowding out his "relationship with God", and sees the same in other activists.

In his college history studies Husain learns that the idea of a pure Islamic state, is 'not the continuation of a political entity set up by the Prophet, maintained by the caliphs down the ages (however debatable)', but (according to Husain) borne out of an 'alien', Wahhabi interpretation of Islam. HT founder Taqiuddin al-Nabhani's vision of a state to re-established Islamic caliphate was 'not innovatory Muslim thinking but wholly derived (according to Husain) from European political thought' of Hegel, Rousseau, Antonio Gramsci, and others.

Husain's breaking point with HT comes when a Nigerian-British Christian student is stabbed and killed at Husain's college in connection with an earlier Muslim-Christian confrontation. Husain feels "guilt" as the college HT representative who, he says, "had encouraged Muslim fervour, a sense of separation from others, a belief that Muslims were worthier than other humans." In a press release HT itself denies it had ever operated on the campus (falsely, according to Husain), and misleadingly asserts it is a "nonviolent" group.

After quitting HT, Husain finishes college, finds but then quits a lucrative but soul deadening job in the City, and marries. Only gradually severing his psychologically links with Islamism, he begins to discover 'classical, traditional Islam', which includes Sufi mysticism. He and his wife move to Damascus, Syria and then to Jeddah, Saudi Arabia, close to Mecca, to study Arabic and teach English at the British Council. There he is outraged by the enthusiasm of many of his students for the 7/7 jihadi killing of British civilians, but also startled by the casual racism of the Saudis, and the "misery and squalor" of a Muslim African shantytown in Jeddah amid the wealth and luxury of the Kingdom. He contrasts it to the public housing and benefits provided to poor immigrants in the non-Muslim UK.

As far as I was concerned, Muslims enjoyed a better lifestyle in non-Muslim Britain than they did in Muslim Saudi Arabia. ... All my talk of ummah seemed so juvenile now. .... Racism was an integral part of Saudi society. My students often used the word "nigger" to describe black people. Even dark-skinned Arabs were considered inferior to their lighter-skinned cousins. I was living in the world's most avowedly Muslim country, yet I found it anything but. I was appalled by the imposition of Wahhabism in the public realm, something I had implicitly sought as an Islamist.

Despite Saudi separation of the genders, the lack of respect for women is far worse than in the UK or "secular" Muslim Syria (according to Husain),

In supermarkets I only had to be away from Faye [his wife] for five minutes and Saudi men would hiss or whisper obscenities as they walked past. ....

We had heard stories of the abduction of women from taxis by sex-deprived Saudi youths. At a Saudi friend's wedding at a luxurious hotel in Jeddah, women dared not step out of their hotel rooms and walk to the banqueting hall for fear of abduction by the bodyguards of a Saudi prince who also happened to be staying there. ....

Why had the veil and segregation not prevented such behaviour?

In 2005, Husain returns to London, dismayed to discover what he calls "a sophisticated, entrenched form of Islamism and Wahhabism on the rise" despite the post-7/7 "intense media scrutiny of extremism in Britain." He ends with a call for the "normal" or "mainstream" Islam of "most" British Muslims, rejecting both the Islamist tenets of "subordination of women" and "hatred of Jews, Hindus, Americans, gays", and the Muslim "integration" into non-Muslim British culture with its binge drinking, gambling, and 'Big Brother' and Ladettes lifestyle.

== Reception ==
The book has been "much-praised," although the praise has not been unanimous.

=== Positive ===
The Sunday Times described the book as "insightful and gripping".

Martin Amis wrote that "Ed Husain has written a persuasive and stimulating book."

The Times columnist David Aaronovitch argued that "Husain's account is not sensationalist, tending more to understatement than to hyperbole."

Anushka Asthana of The Observer wrote,

This captivating, and terrifyingly honest, book is his attempt to make amends for some of the wrongs he committed. In a wake-up call to monocultural Britain, it takes you into the mind of young fundamentalists, exposing places in which the old notion of being British is defunct.

The Daily Mail columnist and author of Londonistan, Melanie Phillips says Husain "should be applauded for his courage" and displayed "intellectual honesty and guts".

According to John Gray of the London School of Economics,

The Islamist is first and foremost a riveting personal narrative, but it also carries a powerful and—for some—unfashionable message. Particularly among the new army of evangelical atheists, there will be those who see his story as another proof of the evils of faith schools and of religion in general. Yet Husain did not finally sever his links with Islamism by becoming a militant atheist and converting to an Enlightenment faith in humanity—as secular fundamentalists urge. He did so by rediscovering what he describes as 'classical, traditional Islam', which includes Sufi mysticism

A review from The Age commented that the book

is an important artefact of our age, carrying a valuable testimony. The challenge - likely to be unmet by ideologues - is to reflect upon its totality, rather than appropriate it selectively for some narrow, predetermined cause.

=== Mixed ===
- Brian Whitaker, who was Middle East editor of The Guardian for seven years, concludes his review by writing that,

The tricky question is what, in the hothouse of youthful politics—whether at Oxford, in Liverpool or east London—leads some to violence while others, like Ed Husain, end up writing books about it. Ed doesn't seem to have an answer, and I doubt that anyone else really knows either.

=== Critical ===
- In The Independent, Ziauddin Sardar, complains of what he sees as Husain's "reductive extremist" activity, first embracing "the extremist cleric Omar Bakri Muhammad, and ... the atrocious Hizb ut-Tahir", and then going in the opposite direction blaming multiculturalism "for the radicalisation of Muslim youth". He goes on to dismiss Husain's book, saying "The Islamist seems to have been drafted by a Whitehall mandarin as a PR job for the Blair government."
- Writing in The Guardian, Madeleine Bunting argues that

Husain's book will be used in many debates—the future of multiculturalism, whether infringements of civil liberties are necessary to combat terrorism, what parts of Islamist histories from Asia and the Middle East a British Muslim community needs to jettison. One suspects the naivety which took him into Hizb-ut Tahrir has blinded him as to how his story will be used to buttress positions hostile to many things he holds dear—his own faith and racial tolerance, for example. A glance at the blog response to a Husain piece in the Telegraph reveals how rightwing racism and anti-Islamic sentiment are feasting on his testimony.

- A commentary page piece in The Guardian by Riazat Butt accused Husain of having been a peripheral character whose association with Islamic groups in Britain occurred over a decade ago.

He is happy to reinforce stereotypes and justifies this by saying he knows what inspires terrorists—the likely inference being that his book is an educational tool. But Husain was not a terrorist and his account is dated and misleading. The groups he mentions, and their modus operandi, are more fluid and sophisticated now. Husain provides no new answers and no fresh information. The activities of Hizb ut-Tahrir and their ilk have been well documented already. I have to ask why, when his experiences are firmly based in the 1990s, this book is being published now and is being greeted with an adulation that is both embarrassing and unwarranted.

== See also ==
- Ed Husain
- Maajid Nawaz
- Islamism
- Radical: My Journey out of Islamist Extremism
- Extremism
- East London Mosque
- Islamism in London
- Undercover Mosque
- Londonistan: How Britain is Creating a Terror State Within
- Muslim Brotherhood
- Islamic terrorism
