= Islam: Beliefs and Teachings =

Islam: Beliefs and Teachings is an internationally recognised book by Ghulam Sarwar of the Muslim Educational Trust. It was published by Sarwar as the first English textbook for madrasa students in Britain.

== Publication details ==
- 1st Edition, London 1980 (10,000), reprinted in India 1983 (2,000)
- 2nd Edition, London 1982 (12,000), reprinted in India 12 times 1989-1999 (24,000)
- 3rd Edition, London 1984 (20,000), reprinted in Kuwait 1985 (10,000), London 1987 (20,000)
- 4th Edition, London 1989 (20,000), reprinted in Pakistan 1992 (5,000), London 1992 (20,000), 1994 (20,000), 1996 (20,000)
- 5th Edition, London 1998 (21,000), reprinted in India 2000 (2,000)
- 6th Edition, London 2000 (21,000), reprinted in India 2001 (2,000), 2002 (4,000)
- 7th Edition, London 2003 (21,000), reprinted by The Islamic Foundation at Chennai in India 2004 (4,000)
- 8th Edition, London 2006 (21,000), Pages: 240, ISBN 0-907261-45-0

Overseas editions: French, Norwegian, Romanian, Chinese and Bengali

Sarwar notes in the preface, that "I feel humbled to note that 275,000 copies of my book 'Islam: Beliefs and Teachings' have been printed in England since 1980".

== Approving critique ==
The Independent newspaper call it a "popular school textbook" The Times newspaper say that it is a "standard text for Muslim religious education"

== Critical reception ==
Ed Husain states that "The first book I read about Islam in English was Islam: Beliefs and Teachings by Ghulam Sarwar" and goes on to state that after only being taught about Islam orally by his family, Sarwars book "filled a gap".

As he was taught that Islam and politics do not mix he says that "one part of the book has stayed with me." This being the chapter "Political System in Islam". He says that Sarwar said that Politics within Islam is fundamental.

The book was written in collaboration with Usamah K. Ward, Prof Dr. Muhammad Abdul Jabbar Beg, Dr. Faruq Nurul Arefin, Dr. Muhammad Qamarul Hasan and Nasreen Sarwar, Farhat Yasmeen Sarwar, Ruqaiyyah Waris Maqsood (Rosalyn Kendrick) (former head of Religious Studies) and Syed Dohan Nuh.

== Copyright infringement ==
Sarwar writes in the preface of the 8th Edition that:

- "It is sad to note that the book has been pirated in the United States, India and the Far East. We do not know how many thousands of copies have been pirated, but the estimated number is quite substantial. We would urge publishers, booksellers, teachers and all readers not to sell or buy pirated copies of the book. Piracy is a menace and dealing in pirated books is like dealing in stolen goods. We hope the combined efforts of honest publishers, booksellers and readers will help us stop the cancer of piracy."

== See also ==
- Ghulam Sarwar (writer)
- Muslim Educational Trust
