= Londonistan: How Britain Is Creating a Terror State Within =

2006 book by Melanie Phillips

Londonistan: How Britain is Creating a Terror State Within
- Author: Melanie Phillips
- Language: English
- Subjects: Islamic terrorism Politics
- Publisher: Encounter Books
- Publication date: 2006
- Publication place: United Kingdom
- Media type: Print (Hardcover)
- Pages: 212
- ISBN: 1-59403-144-4
- OCLC: 64595883
- Dewey Decimal: 363.3250941 22
- LC Class: HV6433.G7 P55 2006

Londonistan: How Britain is Creating a Terror State Within is a 2006 best-selling book by the British journalist Melanie Phillips about the spread of Islamism in the United Kingdom over the previous twenty years. The book was published in London by Encounter Books.

== Reception ==
According to Kenan Malik in The Independent, Phillips's arguments share some striking similarities with Islamists. He wrote that, "Both insist that we are in a religious world war between the forces of good and evil. Both believe that only religion can help restrain decadent behaviour and establish a proper moral framework. Both abhor the growth of secular humanism. Both see Britain as "a debauched and disorderly culture of instant gratification, with disintegrating families, feral children and violence, squalor and vulgarity on the streets".

Describing the book in The American Conservative magazine, the writer Theodore Dalrymple wrote "the British journalist Melanie Phillips documents not only the establishment and growth of Muslim extremist groups in London but the administrative incompetence and cultural weakness that permitted it to happen. Some pusillanimity that she records would be funny if it were not so deeply disturbing."

Writing for The Daily Telegraph, the historian and writer Michael Burleigh decided that the book could not be more "timely" and praised her "sensible suggestions".

David Smith, writing for The Observer, compared Phillips to "a crazed boxer" who "comes out swinging wildly and some of her punches land. ... But her shrill, hectoring tone does her no favours." Smith also claims that Phillips is wrong to say that piggy banks were banished from British banks in case Muslims were offended, "a small point, perhaps, but a telling one".

Phillips has been noted to have praised the scholarship of Bat Ye'or, and Londonistan has been described by Christopher Othen as "her own book about the localised version of Eurabian dhimmitude all around her".

== See also ==
- Criticism of multiculturalism
- Eurabia
- The Islamist
- Islamist demonstration outside Danish Embassy in London in 2006
- Islamophobia
- Londonistan
- Londonstani
- Undercover Mosque

== Bibliography ==
- Phillips, Melanie (2006). Londonistan. New York: Encounter Books. ISBN 1594031444.
