= Education Reform Act 1988 =

Act of the Parliament of the United Kingdom

Education Reform Act 1988 (Note: Section 238(1).)
- Act of Parliament
- Parliament of the United Kingdom
- Long title: An Act to amend the law relating to education.
- Citation: 1988 c. 40
- Territorial extent: Whole act England and Wales; ss. 131, 134, 202-205, 207, 214-216, 231, 232, 235-236 and 238 and Sch. 8 and 11 Scotland; ss. 208 and 217(1) Northern Ireland; amendments of legislation which extends to Northern Ireland and Scotland also extend there (Note: Section 38.)

Dates
- Royal assent: 29 July 1988
- Commencement: Various dates from 29 July 1988 to 1 August 1992 (Note: Section 236.)

Other legislation
- Amends: London Government Act 1963; Employers' Liability (Compulsory Insurance) Act 1969; Pensions (Increase) Act 1971; Rent Act 1977; County Courts Act 1984
- Amended by: Planning (Consequential Provisions) Act 1990; Further and Higher Education Act 1992; Education (Schools) Act 1992; Tribunals and Inquiries Act 1992; Charities Act 1993; Employment Tribunals Act 1996; Employment Rights Act 1996; Education Act 1996; Audit Commission Act 1998; Statute Law (Repeals) Act 2004; Charities Act 2011

Status: Amended

Text of statute as originally enacted

Revised text of statute as amended

Text of the Education Reform Act 1988 as in force today (including any amendments) within the United Kingdom, from legislation.gov.uk.

The Education Reform Act 1988 (c. 40) is an act of the Parliament of the United Kingdom that introduced multiple changes to the education system in England and Wales, including the introduction of Key Stages and the National Curriculum. It replaced many rules and structures that had been in place since the 'Butler' Education Act 1944.

== Provisions ==
The main provisions of the Education Reform Act are as follows:

- Academic tenure was abolished for academics appointed on or after 20 November 1987.
- An element of choice was introduced, where parents could specify which school was their preferred choice.
- City Technology Colleges (CTCs) were introduced. This part of the Act allowed new more autonomous schools to be taken out of the direct financial control of local authorities. Financial control would be handed to the head teacher and governors of a school. There was also a requirement for partial private funding. There were only fifteen schools that were eventually set up. The successor to this programme was the establishment of academies.
- Controls on the use of the word 'degree' were introduced with respect to UK bodies.
- Grant-maintained schools (GMS) were introduced. Primary and secondary schools could, under this provision, remove themselves fully from their respective local education authorities and would be completely funded by central government. Secondary schools also had limited selection powers at the age of eleven.
- 'Key Stages' (KS) were introduced in schools. At each key stage a number of educational objectives were to be achieved.
- Local management of schools (LMS) was introduced. This part of the Act allowed all schools to be taken out of the direct financial control of local authorities. Financial control would be handed to the head teacher and governors of a school. For further education colleges, the greater autonomy brought in by the 1988 Act was extended by the Further and Higher Education Act 1992 to become complete independence of local authority control, as colleges were 'incorporated'.
- The National Curriculum (NC) was introduced.
- The Inner London Education Authority was abolished with effect from 1 April 1990 and its functions transferred to the inner London Boroughs.

== Commencement ==
Date of commencement	Provisions	Authority for commencement
29 July 1988	ss. 1; 2(1)(b) and (2); 3 and 4; 14 and 15 and Sch. 2; 20 to 22 and 23(1); 25; 33 to 45 and Schedule 3; 46 to 104 and Sch. 4 and 5; 105; 112 and 113; 116; 119; 137 to 151; 153 to 201 and Sch. 8 as far as relating to the Education Assets Board, Sch. 9 and 10 and para. 67 of Sch. 12; 202 to 208 and Sch 11; 212 and 213; 217; 219 so far as relating to grant-maintained schools; 221 to 225 and 227(1); 230 to 235 and Sch. 6; 236; Part I of Sch. 12, paras. 60, 81, 82 and 102 of that Sch. and s. 237(1) so far as relating to those provisions and s. 238	s. 236(1)
29 September 1988	ss. 2(1)(a) and (3); 6, 8, 9, 10(1), 11 and 13 and Sch. 1	s. 236(3)
1 April 1990	Part II of Sch. 12; Part I of Sch. 13 and s. 237(1) so far as relating to those provisions	ss. 236(4) and (5)

== Use of the word 'degree' ==
The Act uses a common technique in UK legislation in that it makes it illegal to offer or advertise any qualification that appears to be, or might be mistaken for, a UK degree.

This restriction is then removed in respect of qualifications from bodies on a list maintained by statutory instrument.

== Religion ==
The act required "broadly Christian" acts of worship in schools. The National Muslim Education Council objected and requested that the wording to be changed to "the worship of the one supreme God".

This requirement was built upon in the School Standards and Framework Act 1998.
