= Gautam Malkani =

British financial journalist and author (born 1976)

- Born: 27 August 1976 (age 49); Hounslow, London, England
- Education: Christ's College, Cambridge (Social and Political Sciences)
- Occupations: Journalist; author

Gautam Malkani (born 27 August 1976) is a British journalist and the author of the novel Londonstani. He has worked for The Financial Times on its UK news desk in London, at the Washington bureau, and was an associate editor on the FT Weekend Magazine, after a spell on the newspaper's Business Life section.

== Biography ==
He was born in Hounslow, London on 27 August 1976. Malkani's father is Sindhi and his mother was a Ugandan of Indian descent. He studied Social and Political Sciences at Christ's College, Cambridge. Malkani currently resides in London.
