= Safa Khulusi =

Iraqi writer and poet (1917-1995)

- صفاء عبد العزيز خلوصي
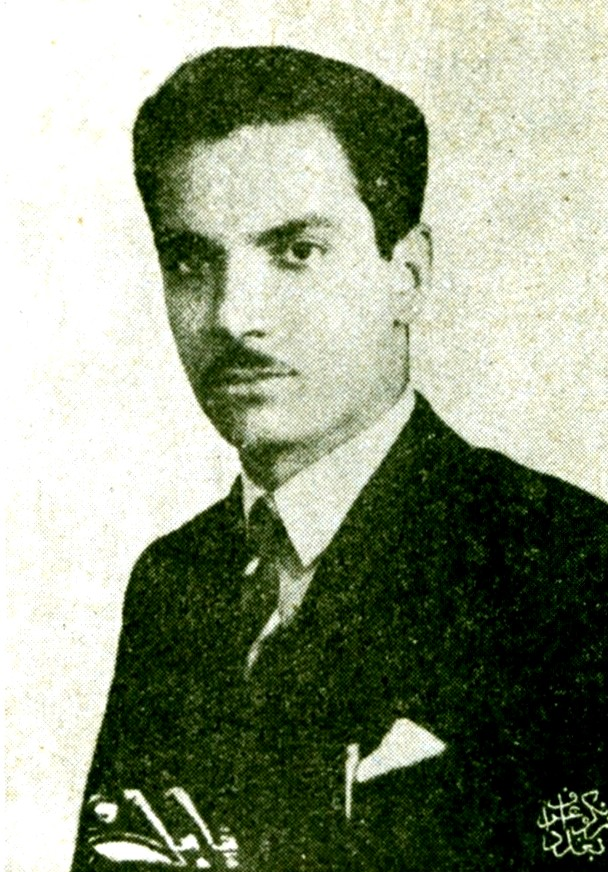
- Safa Khulusi (age 24 years) as he appears on the cover of his first novel published in 1941
- Born: 17 August 1917; Baghdad, Ottoman Empire
- Died: 8 September 1995 (aged 78); London, England
- Occupations: Linguist, writer, poet, journalist, translator, lexicographer, historian
- Spouse: Sabiha Al-Dabbagh

Safa Abdul-Aziz Khulusi (Arabic: صفاء عبد العزيز خلوصي; 1917–1995) was an Iraqi historian, novelist, poet, journalist and broadcaster. He is known for mediating between Arabic- and English-language cultures, and for his scholarship of modern Iraqi literature.

Apart from his literary output, he is now mainly remembered for his theories on the Shakespeare authorship question, which involved the view that Shakespeare either was an Arab or was heavily influenced by Arabic literature.

== Background and career ==
Khulusi was born in Baghdad, the son of a lawyer. His mother died when he was four years old. His family originates from Khanaqin. His grandfather resettled the family in Baghdad where he served as an officer in the Ottoman army, but was killed during the military withdrawal from Mesopotamia at the end of World War I.

Khulusi was inspired to pursue a literary career from an early age by his uncle, the novelist and poet Abdul-Majid Lutfi. Khulusi travelled to London in 1935 on an academic scholarship, living there until the latter stages of World War II and insisting on staying in the city during The Blitz. He returned to Iraq late in the war.

An Arab nationalist, Khulusi turned down an offer of a ministerial position in the post-war British administration of Iraq. Instead, he divided his time between Britain and Iraq, establishing an academic career in both countries. His first novel Nifous Maridha (Sick Souls) was published in 1941, when he was 24 years old. His first academic post was as a lecturer in Arabic Studies at the School of Oriental and African Studies, London University. During his tenure (1945–50) he completed a PhD in Arabic literature in 1947. In 1951 he was appointed as Professor of Arabic at the University of Baghdad. He also served as head of the Arabic Department at al-Mustansiriya University.

In 1959, Khulusi married Sabiha Al-Dabbagh (1922–1998), one of the first women to graduate as a medical doctor in Iraq. Following postgraduate training in the United States she returned to practice in Baghdad, where she was introduced to Khulusi. She later became a regular contributor to health programmes on the Arabic section of the BBC World Service and a campaigner for women's health in the Middle East. The couple had two children, a son and a daughter.

Khulusi's work mediated modern European and American developments in scholarship. He extended the academic tradition of comparative literature, publishing Dirasat fi al-Adab al-Muqarin wa al-Mathahib al-Adabia (Studies in Comparative Literature and Western Literary Schools) in 1957, and al-Tarjama al-Tahlilia (Analytical Translation) in the same year. Although concentrating on literary and historical scholarship, Khulusi also published novels, short stories and poetry during this period. In addition, he translated modern Iraqi literature into English, publishing a number of translations of the work of Atika Wahbi Al-Khazraji. In Oxford in 1972, he became one of the editors of the Concise Oxford English-Arabic Dictionary of Current Usage which sought to match new developments in both languages. He later published A Dictionary of Contemporary Idiomatic Usage. His books Fann al-Tarjama (The Art of Translation) and Fann al-Taqti' al-Shi'ri wa al-Qafia (The Art of Poetry: Composition and Prosody) were widely read and went through many editions. He was also a regular broadcaster on the BBC's Arabic service and a presenter of cultural programs on Iraqi television.

While participating in the Arabic literary revival Khulusi attempted to remain ‘neutral’ in the unstable politics of the era. In 1958 the king Faisal II of Iraq and his family were overthrown in a violent revolution. One of their executioners was an army officer who had been one of Khulusi's students. Many years later, when Khulusi met the man again and questioned him on his role in the king's death, the former student answered "all I did was remember Palestine, and the trigger on the machine-gun just set itself off". During Saddam Hussein's regime Khulusi spent most of his time in England where he enjoyed a greater freedom of expression in his writing, returning to Iraq for a couple of months a year to avoid the English winter. On one such visit, he explained to a friend who asked why he didn't remain in Baghdad permanently, "Our roots are here, but it's there that we flower best."

Khulusi was a devout Muslim. He was one of a group of scholars who assisted in the academic and religious reformation of the madrasas in Najaf. Khulusi was elected Chairman of the National Muslim Education Council of the UK. He sought to improve Islamic education, while also supporting co-operation between faiths. He also defended traditions of tolerance within Islam. He wrote widely for Muslim publications.

== Shakespeare and the theory of Arab ancestry and Arabic influence ==
The Chandos portrait of Shakespeare. Khulusi argued that the dusky features and pointed "Islamic" beard were evidence of Shakespeare's Arabic ethnicity.

Following the lead of the 19th-century Arab scholar Ahmad Faris Shidyaq, Khulusi wrote a book which attempted to prove that William Shakespeare was an Arab, the original form of his name being "Shaykh Zubayr". Academic Eric Ormsby summarizes Khulusi's claims as follows,

In a massive tome, the professor argued that the lone survivor of the shipwreck of an Arab merchant vessel washed up on the shores of Elizabethan England and made his way, wet, bedraggled, and famished, to the nearest village where he found hospitality and shelter. Establishing himself, there our mariner quickly mastered English and in short order was churning out remarkable poems and dramas. Relocated to Stratford-on-Avon and London, he rose to prominence in the theater, even winning the favor of the Virgin Queen. His original name had been Shaykh Zubayr, but (though there is no letter p in the Arabic alphabet) this was soon anglicized to Shakespeare.
This thesis, which would have delighted Jorge Luis Borges, rested not merely on fanciful historical supposition but on a mad, meticulous, and painstaking inventory of Shakespeare's vocabulary. The Iraqi argued, with the unassailable logic of the truly demented, that most of Shakespeare's language could be traced back to Classical Arabic.... Even more telling, our scholar detected scores, even hundreds, of borrowings and "cognates" in the Bard's works. To give but one example: the Arabic adjective nabil, which means "noble," occurs, naturally enough, throughout the plays and poems.

Khulusi's thesis was expounded in Arabic publications. He also wrote several articles in English on Shakespeare and Arabian literature for the Islamic Review, but did not claim Shakespeare himself was Arabian in these publications. In 1966 he suggested that Romeo and Juliet draws on the "basically Arabian" concept of Platonic love. In 1970 he summarized his arguments about Shakespeare's language, but confined himself to the suggestion that the poet was "under the influence of Arabic style".

His view that Shakespeare had Arabic ancestors is highly speculative and lacks any evidence. His opinions have been opposed by other scholars including Abdul Sattar Jawad, Abdullah Al-Dabbagh, Eric Ormsby, Ferial Ghazoul, as well as the Egyptian scholar Ibrahim Hamadah, who devoted a book, ‘Urubat Shakespeare (The Arabism of Shakespeare) 1989, to refuting Khulusi's thesis. Libyan leader Muammar Gaddafi endorsed Khulusi's views in 1989.

== Abu Nuwas in America ==
His novel Abu Nuwas fi Amrika (Abu Nuwas in America), written during Khulusi's sojourn in Chicago, has been called a "hilarious satire" recounting the extraordinary adventures that befall the Abbasid poet Abu Nuwas, wine- and boy-lover, when he is miraculously transported into America, from his presence on a stamp brought into that country. Part parody of Arabic works on the bewildering experience of life in the West, part picaresque novel, it has the hero tour the louche subcultures, gay and heterosexual, of America from Queens through Las Vegas to Los Angeles, while rising ineluctably to become an authority in the United States on the Arab world.

Notwithstanding the high satiric energy of the novel, Khulusi's intention was to introduce American culture to an Arab readership. He compares Iraqi and American nationalism and the practice of religion in his adopted culture with the Muslim faith. He concludes that, just as American identity comes from a melting pot of peoples, so too is Arab identity, a cultural commitment by peoples of markedly different ethnic background who have come to intermarry, and replace the allegiance of blood with an attachment to a shared language and culture.

== Arabic poetry in English ==
Khulusi set out to introduce English readers to contemporary Iraqi poetry by translating the works of some of the most prominent and influential poets of the first half of the 20th century. This was a period of significant social and political change, an era of wars and civil strife, and also a time when poetry was highly valued and influential in Arab society and particularly in Iraq. The appearance of a famous poet at a public meeting for example, would generate a large crowd, and mainstream daily newspapers regularly replaced their lead paragraph with poetic verses employing all manner of eloquence and rhetoric to win the affection of the reader and sway a political argument.

=== Political and social themes ===
From the end of the 19th century, the rise to prominence of talented radical poets Jamil Sidqi al-Zahawi (1863–1936) and Ma'ruf al-Rusafi (1875–1945) popularized poetry containing social and political themes. According to Khulusi, both al-Zahawi and al-Rusafi learned from contemporary Turkish poets, such as Tawfiq Fikrat, the value of charging poetry with powerful messages. Al-Rusafi was the more ferocious and shocking in his political attacks, while Zahawi's ire was directed at what he believed to be outdated social attitudes.

Al-Zahawi's poetry extolling a utopian society was his attempt to set the agenda for a social revolution, particularly on views towards women in post-Ottoman Iraq. According to Khulusi, this was largely unwelcomed at the time, but proved nonetheless influential as a catalyst for change in the decades that followed. Khulusi renders the incendiary work including what he calls “Zahawi's tirade against the veil”:

O Daughter of Iraq! tear the veil into pieces,
And go about unveiled, for life demands revolutions.
Tear it and burn it without delay
For indeed it is a false guardian.

Khulusi illustrates al-Zahawi's attempt to introduce the concept of gender equality in his celebrated poem Ba'da alfi 'Am (A Thousand Years Hence):

If you happen one day to see their women
You will stand perplexed, like someone who has lost his sense
They share with men their hard work briskly
And they do their work ably and perfectly.
They sit side by side with men in courts,
And display ideas and thoughts that are so close to perfection.
Amongst them are governors and generals
Amongst them are soldiers and workers.
Their marriage is none other than a contract
It is observed by a couple so long as love endures.
But the upbringing and education of their children
is according to their law, the responsibility of their government
Which is the Mother of all.

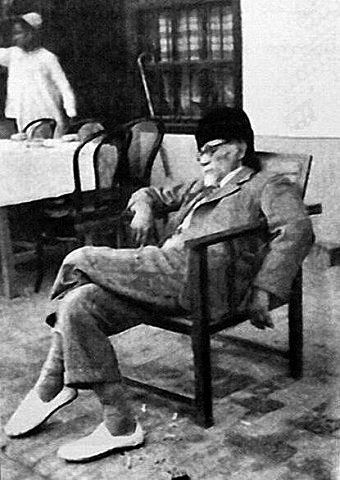
Jamil Sidqi al-Zahawi devoted his energy to versifying the quest for gender equality in Iraqi society

As with al-Rusafi and al-Zahawi before him, Muhammad Mahdi al-Jawahiri (1899–1997) also versified his challenge to the established attitudes towards women. He chose a less aggressive, more persuasive tone which Khulusi attempts to capture in this sample of his translation:

We have merchandise that provides us with children
We raise and lower its price according to financial crises.
I found her in other nations as object of pride
That brightens the house, the markets and the churches.

According to Khulusi, al-Jawahiri takes up the cause of social exclusion and poverty from al-Rusafi. He illustrates the gulf in society by describing life in the houses and villas of the rich, built next to shanty dwellings where the deprived live in squalid conditions with their children and livestock.

In those palaces and rich houses,
Nights of dancing rakishly pass
Where the legs of the beautiful ladies are bare.
Liquors and wines are brought to them from East and West,
From wherever they are distilled best.
And only next door to them a woman lies on the ground
Scorpions flirting with her flanks.

In Khulusi view, al-Jawahiri was also “the poet of every revolutionary movement”. The revolt of January 1948 was one example. He composed long epics on the subject, and elegized his brother, Ja'far al-Jawahiri who died during the revolt. The same year saw war in the Holy Land and Jawahiri directed his anger at Arab leaders who promoted themselves during this time as 'saviours of Palestine'. Khulusi tries to capture the tone of sarcasm of the original poem:

He defeated the calamity with his handkerchief.
Boastfully pretending, like a silly lad
That his eyes burst with tears.

Martial law in 1948 was officially a means to protect the military operations in Palestine and to save the rear of the Arab armies. According to Khulusi, the law was skilfully extended to deal with young men with liberal ideas. Living close by, al-Jawahiri regularly passed the prison gates in Baghdad and could see groups of young men, from all backgrounds and professions, being led inside, and relatives waiting for news of other men already taken. In his poem al-Jawahiri says:

May you not wait for long.
And may the shackled time hurry your steps forward
So Balasim, give the teacher his due,
And support him, for he has no supporter.
If it be possible for a free man to prostrate himself in adoration,
Then I would have been a prostrated slave to the teacher.

Later in the same poem he adds prophetically:

A future era will say of our present state of affairs
With which we are being scorched:
Curse thee you extinct era!

=== Women and poetry ===
Following al-Zahawi's death in 1936, Salma al-Malaika (1908–1953) writing under the name Umm Nizar, enters the Iraqi literary scene. According to Khulusi, her first poem is also the very first to be published for any woman in Iraq and appropriately its al-Zahawi's elegy.

When merciless death called on you,
Poetry burst into tears to mourn
The Iraqi nation, when it saw
Your charming place vacant,
O you who had brought back
To the East its past glory,
Which it had nearly forgotten but for you.

Umm Nizar refers to al-Zahawi's poetry on the subject of emancipation. Khulusi records that al-Zahawi wrote about a fictitious character named Leila who is denied her rightful and equal place in society. Leila is intended to symbolize the Iraqi woman. Umm Nizar writes:

Who is now to defend Leila:
O thou who were her champion?
We never thought that you would one day forsake her.
When you were singing, you used to inspire even inanimate objects
With feeling, intelligence and perception.

According to Khulusi, Umm Nizar echoes al-Zahawi's message, calling on women to break the fetters of centuries and step forward as saviours of their country. He reports that the feminist genre of her poetry adds a description of the status of women and their achievements during various periods of Islamic civilization. She details their intolerable position in 1930s and 40s Iraq, and describes in verse how the place of women has not only fallen far behind modern civilization, but far below where it had been in the Middle Ages. The following couplet affords a good example of Umm Nizar's style as depicted by Khulusi.

We have become so used to weakness;
And felt so contented and at home with our misfortune,
That we do not aspire in our life to anything
Save a skirt and a mirror!

Umm Nizar is followed into print by a number of other women including her daughter Nazik Al-Malaika, who writes emotional, imaginative and rebellious odes. Lami'a 'Abbas 'Amara is noted for her humor and epigrammatic lines. 'Atika Wahbi al-Khazraji versifies the tragedy of Majnoon Layla. Fatina al-Naib, better known by her pen-name Saduf al-'Ubaydiyya, composes poetry for her own personal enjoyment rather than public acclaim and eventually finds that she has completed the contents of four volumes. Khulusi renders entire poems and extracts of this ground-breaking literary work and illustrates the range and versatility of these pioneering women.

== Selected publications ==
- Nifous Maridha (Sick Souls), novel in Arabic 1941
  نفوس مريضة
- Bint al-Siraj, Rihla ila Spania (The Saddlers Daughter, Travels Through Spain) 1952
  بنت السراج ، رحلة الى اسبانيا
- Abu-Nuwas fi Amrika (Abu-Nuwas in America) 1956
  أبو نؤاس في أمريكا
- Fann al-Tarjama (The Art of Translation) 1956
  فن الترجمة
- Dirasat fi al-Adab al-Muqarin wa al-Mathahib al-Adabia (Studies in Comparative Literature and Western Literary Schools) 1957
  دراسات في الأدب المقارن والمذاهب الأدبية
- al-Tarjama al-Tahlilia (Analytical Translation) 1957
  الترجمة التحليلية
- al-Nafitha al-Maftuha: Siwar Min al-Sharq wa al-Gharb (The Open Window: Images from East and West) 1958
  النافذة المفتوحة : صور من الشرق والغرب
- Dirasa Hawl Shakespeare (Study of Shakespeare) al-Ma'rifa Journal, Baghdad 1960
  دراسة حول شكسبير، مجلة المعرفة ، بغداد
- Islam Our Choice (1961)
- The History of Baghdad (in the First Half of the 18th Century). Elaboration on the manuscript by Abdu al-Rihman al-Suwaidi (1962)
  تاريخ بغداد لابن السويدي ، تحقيق صفاء خلوصي
- Fann al-Taqti' al-Shi'ri wa al-Qafia (The Art of Poetry: Composition and Prosody) 1963
  فن التقطيع الشعري والقافية
- al-Mawaqi' al-Goghrafia wa Asmaa al-A'laam fi al-Masrahiat al-Shakespeareia (Geographic Locations and Place Names in Shakespearian Plays) 1964
  المواقع الجغرافية واسماء ألاعلام في المسرحيات الشكسبيرية
- Arabian Influence on the concept of Platonic love in Shakespeare, Islamic Review, (Oct 1966)
- al-Fasir aw Sharih Diwan abi't-Tayyib al-Mutanabbi Li Ibn Jinni (Elaboration on the Diwan of Abi't-Tayyib al-Mutanabbi, and the commentary of Ibn Jinni) 1969
  الفسر إو شرح ديوان أبي طيب المتنبي لابن جني
- A Literary History of The Arabs (Tarikh al-Arab al-Adabi), English original by Reynold Nicholson, translated into Arabic by Safa Khulusi 1970
  تاريخ العرب الأدبي ، رينولد نكلسن ، ترجمة صفاء خلوصي
- The Logical Basis of Arabic Grammar, Islamic Review, (July/Aug 1970)
- Arabic Aspects of Shakespeare. Parallel Texts from Othello and Macbeth. Islamic Review (Sept 1970)
- A Comparative Study of Shakespearian and Arabic Grammar, Islamic Review, (Oct/Nov 1970)
- Jafar al-Khalili and the Story of Modern Iraq (1976)
- 'Ma'rūf al Ruṣāfī in Jerusalem', in Arabic and Islamic garland: historical, educational and literary papers presented to Abdul-Latif Tibawi, Islamic Cultural Centre London (1977), pp. 147–152.
- A Dictionary of Contemporary Idiomatic Usage. English- Arabic. National Publishing House, Baghdad (1982)
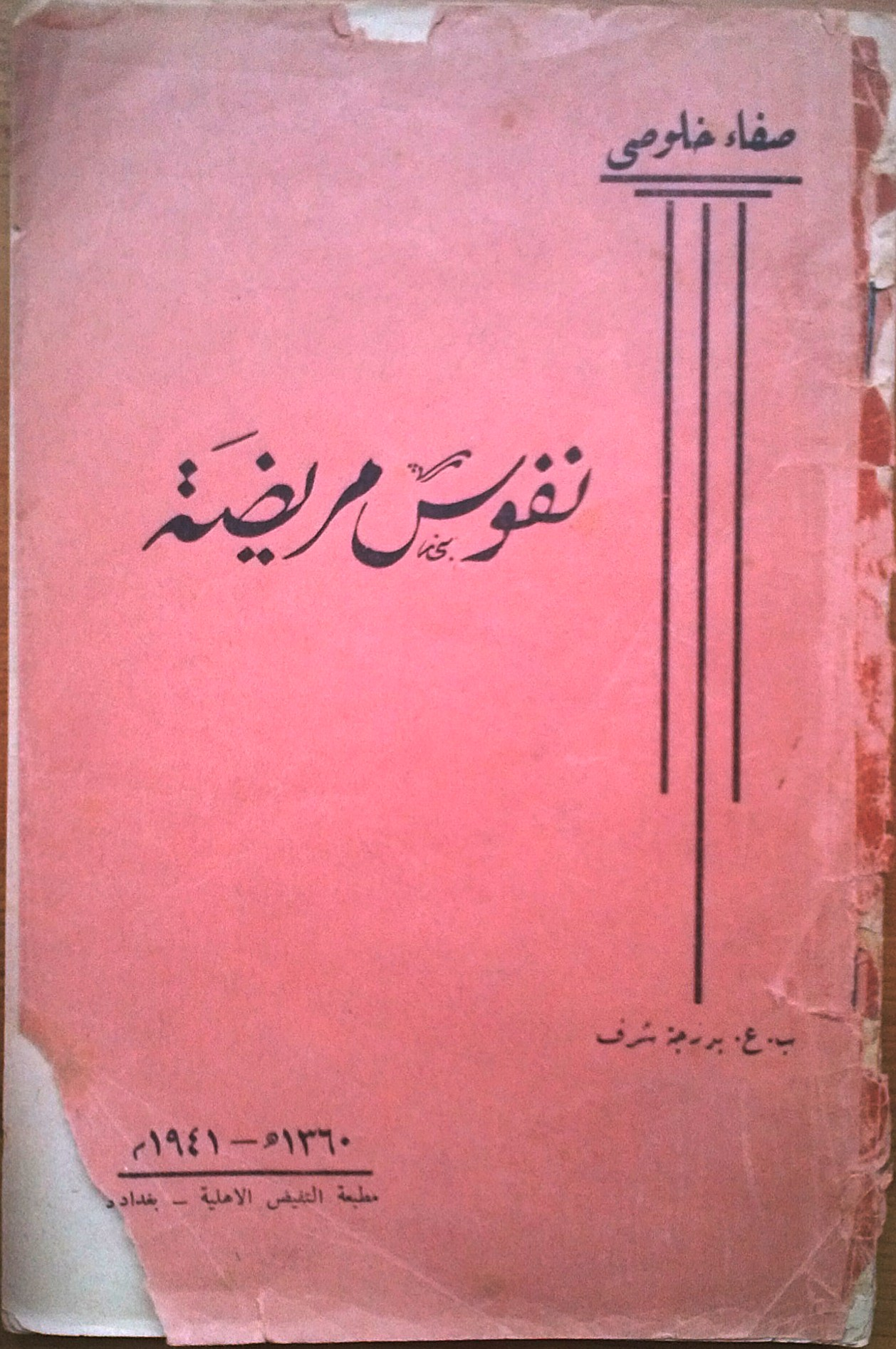
Nifous Maridha (Sick Souls) 1941

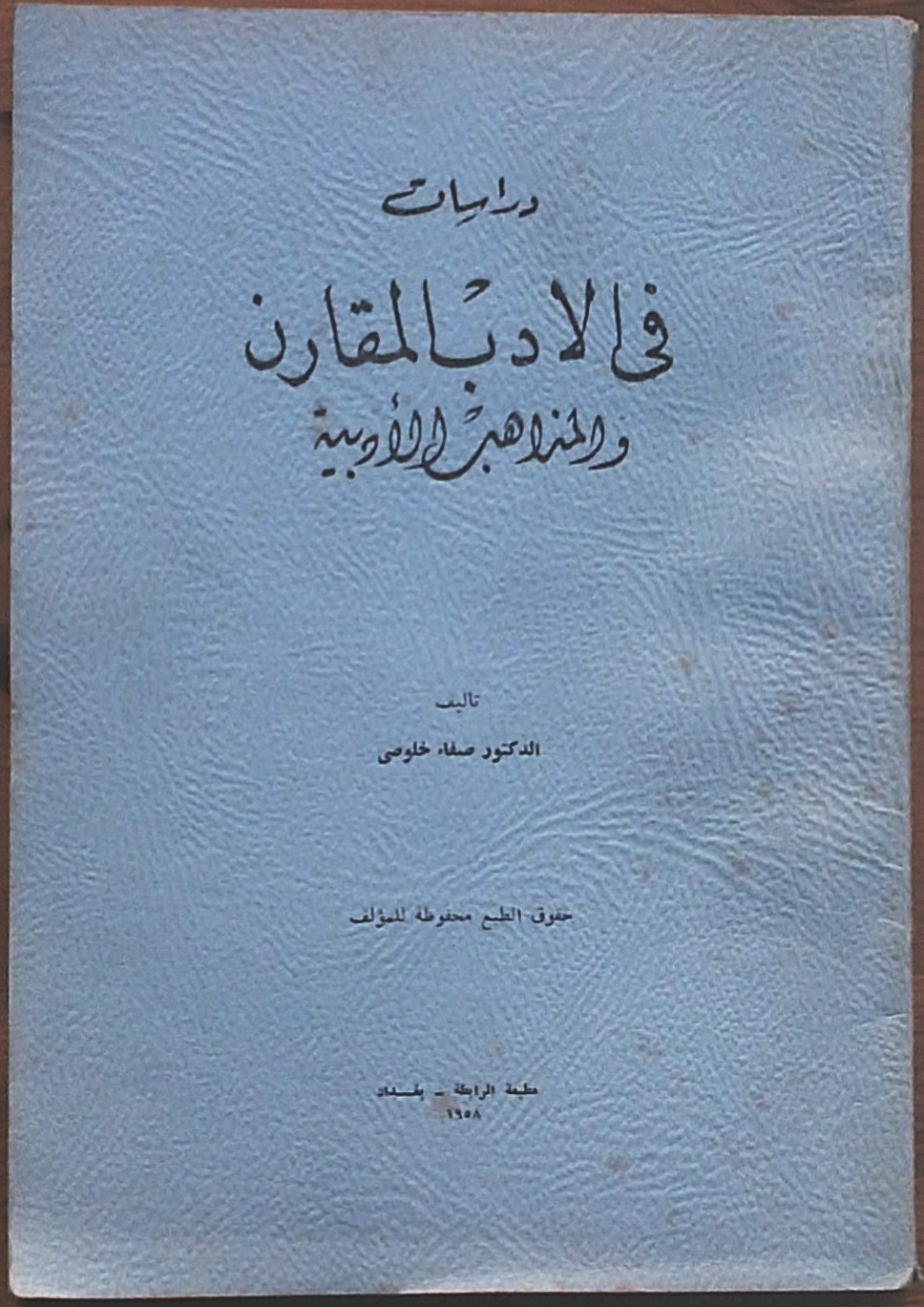
Dirasat fi al-Adab al-Muqarin wa al-Mathahib al-Adabia (Studies in Comparative Literature and Western Literary Schools) 1957

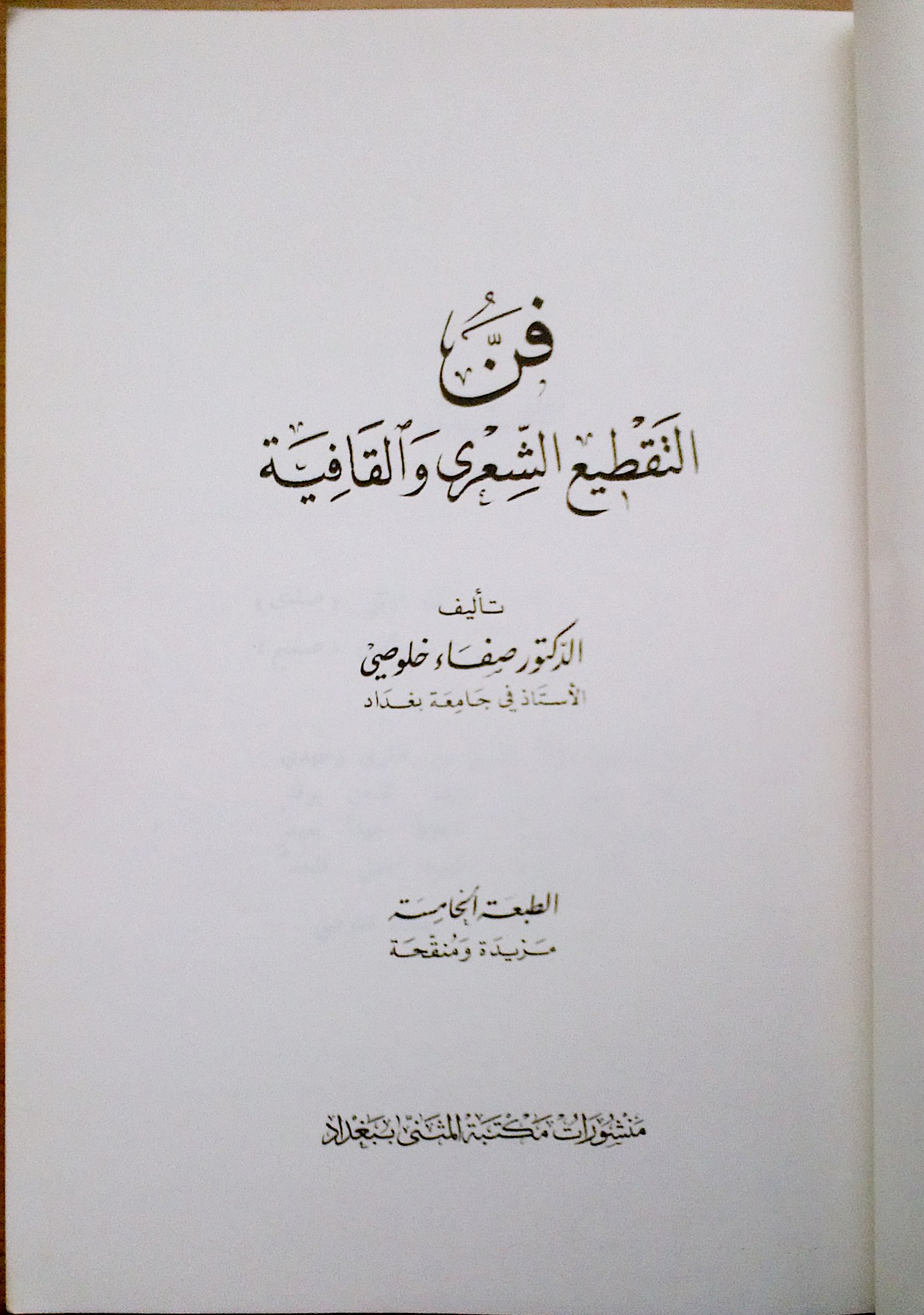
Fann al-Taqti' al-Shi'ri wa al-Qafia (The Art of Poetry: Composition and Prosody) 1963

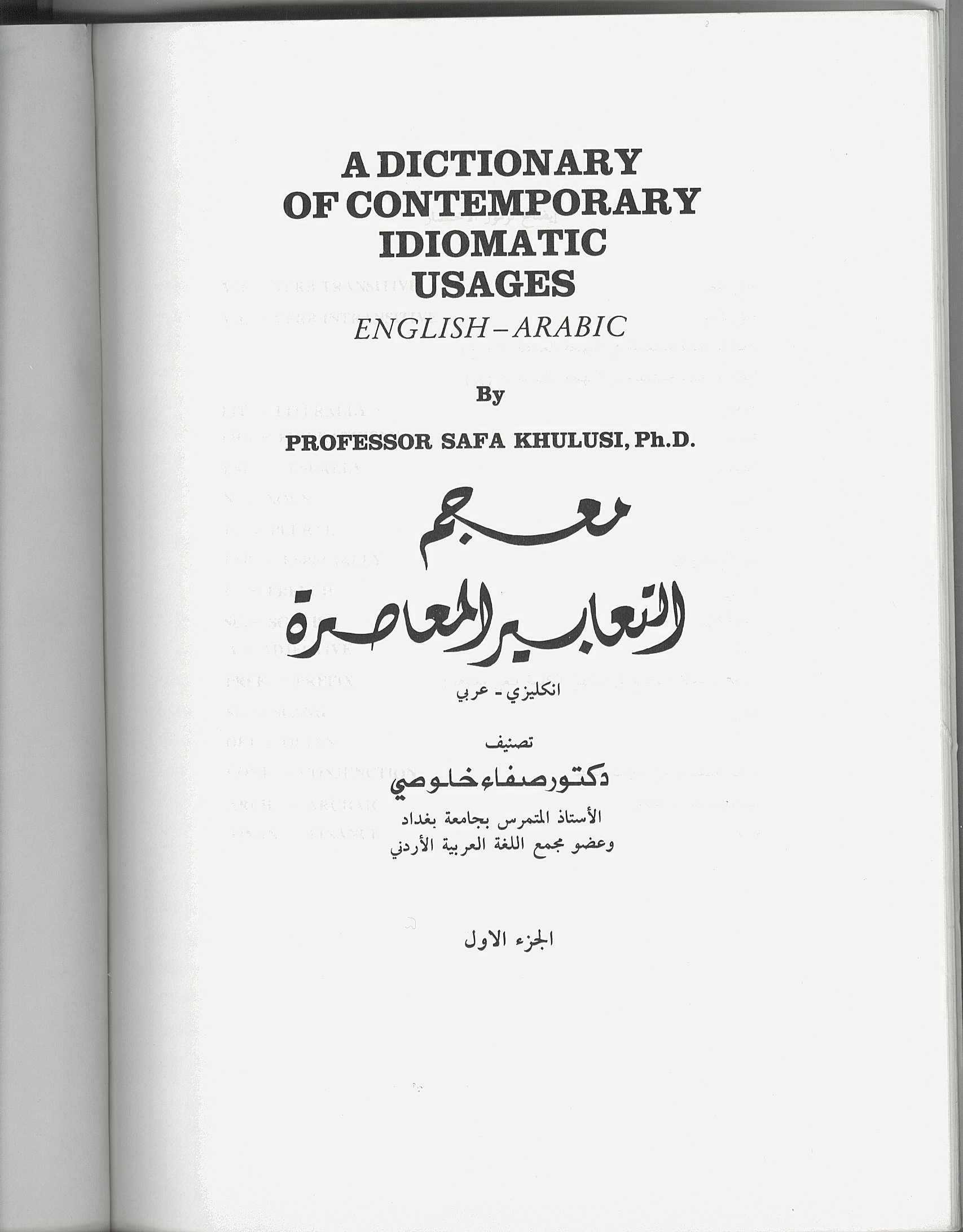
A Dictionary of Contemporary Idiomatic Usages. English- Arabic (1982)
