= Muslim Educational Trust =

Islamic organization based in the United Kingdom

- Abbreviation: MET
- Formation: 1966; 60 years ago
- Type: Educational Organisation
- Location: London
- Coordinates: 51°34′09.3″N 0°06′41.9″W
- Chairman: Prof Ghulam Sarwar
- Website: www.muslim-ed-trust.org.uk

Muslim Educational Trust (MET) is an educational organisation offering information, advice and publications about education and the educational needs of children to parents in particular. It is based in London.

== Schooling ==
From the early 1970s, the Trust started up Islamic religious lessons for Muslim pupils. Schools in the UK had Christian religious lessons as standard, but pupils were allowed to opt out of these classes. The Trust began giving alternative Islamic lessons for pupils to be held during the time in school that they had Christian based religious lessons. Newham was the first borough to allow the Islamic lessons, along with Hackney, followed by Bradford and other cities outside of London. Approx 20 volunteers taught these classes throughout the 1970's.

== Support ==
The Trust began supporting efforts to open private Islamic schools in 1974, and by 1992, 23 Islamic schools were open, all supported by the Trust. Important leaders in this movement were Ibrahim Hewitt, Yusuf Islam (formerly Cat Stevens), Afzal Rahman, and Ghulam Sarwar. In 1991, Sarwar wrote a book, British Muslims and Schools, which focuses on why such schools should exist and why they should receive public funding like other British schools.

== See also ==
- National Muslim Education Council
