= Joshua Rozenberg =

British solicitor, legal affairs commentator, and journalist (born 1950)

Joshua Rozenberg KC (hon)
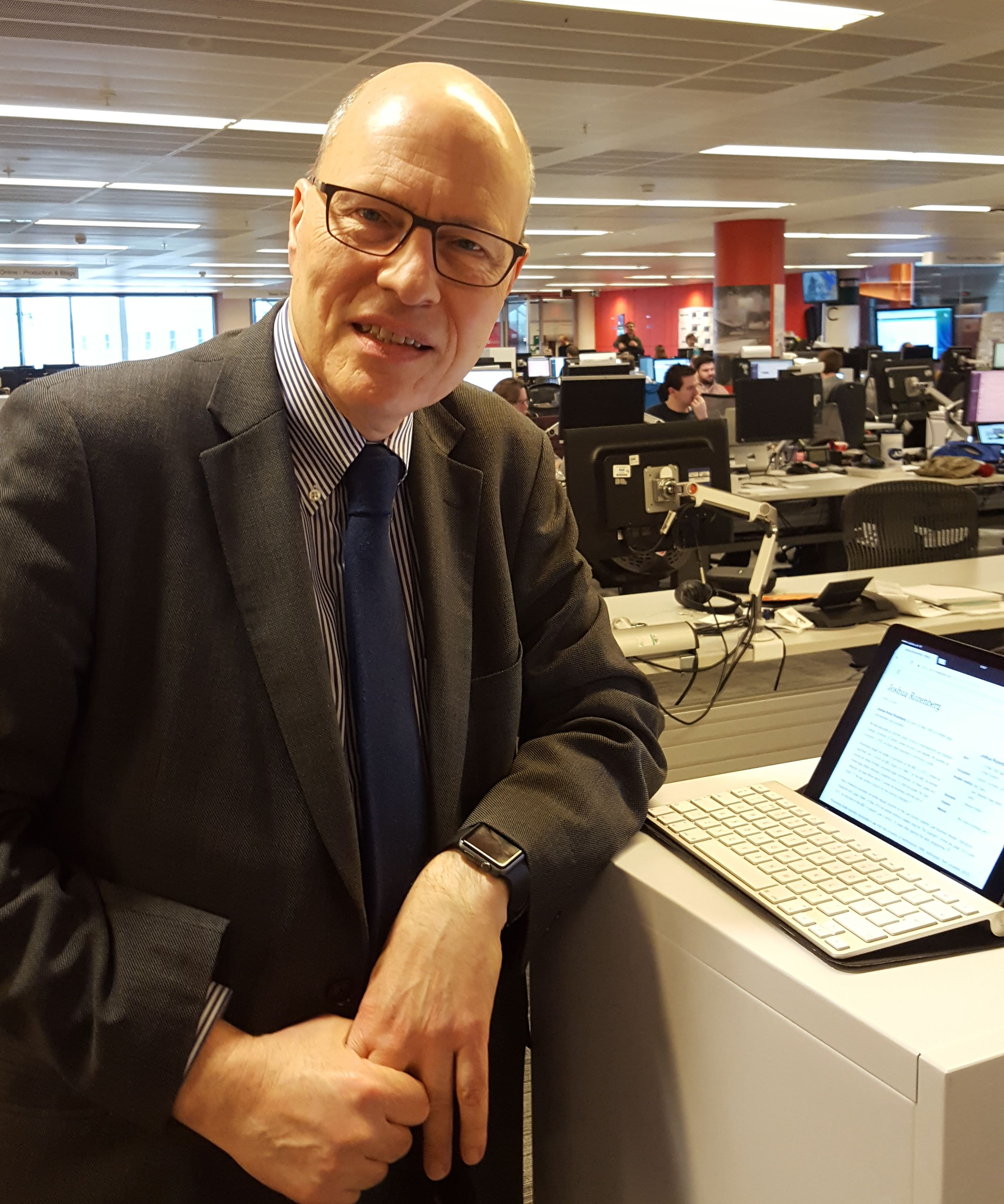
- Rozenberg in 2017
- Born: Joshua Rufus Rozenberg; 30 May 1950 (age 76); United Kingdom
- Occupations: Solicitor, journalist, author
- Notable credit(s): BBC News; Daily Telegraph legal affairs editor
- Spouse: Melanie Phillips
- Children: 2
- Joshua Rozenberg's voice recorded 10 March 2017
- Website: http://www.rozenberg.net

Joshua Rufus Rozenberg (born 30 May 1950) is a British solicitor, legal affairs commentator, and journalist.

== Education and career ==
Joshua Rozenberg was educated at Latymer Upper School in Hammersmith and Wadham College, University of Oxford, where he took a law degree. He qualified as a solicitor in 1976 after training at Dixon Ward solicitors in Richmond, London, although he never practised law.

Rozenberg began his career in journalism in 1975 at the BBC, where he launched Law in Action on BBC Radio 4 in 1984. At the BBC he worked as a producer, reporter and then legal correspondent. In 2000 he left to join The Daily Telegraph as legal affairs editor, where he remained until the end of 2008.

He resigned from his Telegraph position in 2007, explaining in 2015 his reasons for doing so. While reporting for the newspaper on the House of Lords legal ruling on the applicability of the Human Rights Act 1998 outside Britain, Telegraph editors pressured him to include a statement that, under the ruling, legal claimants against the actions of British Army in Iraq would be entitled to millions of pounds in compensation. In Rozenberg's view this was not accurate, and he refused to include the statement. According to Rozenberg, Telegraph news editors later altered one of his reports without his knowledge to include such a statement, one that Rozenberg had warned them was false; the claim appeared under his by-line. (Note: The House of Lords case being, Al-Skeini and others (Respondents) v. Secretary of State for Defence (Appellant); Al-Skeini and others (Appellants) v. Secretary of State for Defence (Respondent))

After leaving the Telegraph Rozenberg wrote a column for the Evening Standard. A freelance journalist since his Telegraph tenure, he writes regular columns for the Law Society Gazette and The Critic. He wrote a weekly column for The Guardian's online law page from 2010 to 2016. Also in 2010, nearly 25 years after leaving the radio programme, he returned to the BBC to present Law in Action until its final edition in March 2024. He continues to be seen on BBC Television News as a legal affairs analyst.

== Recognition ==
Rozenberg holds honorary doctorates in law from the University of Hertfordshire (1999), Nottingham Trent University (2012), the University of Lincoln (2014) and the University of Law (2014). Rozenberg is also an honorary bencher of Gray's Inn, and is a non-executive board member of the Law Commission. He has won the Bar Council's Legal Reporting Award four times. In January 2016, he was made an honorary Queen's Counsel (now known as King's Counsel; KC).

== Publications ==
- Joshua Rozenberg (12 January 1995). The Search for Justice. Hodder & Stoughton. ISBN 0-340-62859-6.
- Joshua Rozenberg (24 April 1997). Trial of Strength, Richard Cohen Books, ISBN 1-86066-094-0.
- Joshua Rozenberg (11 March 2004). Privacy and the Press. OUP Oxford. ISBN 0-19-925056-1.
- Rozenberg, Joshua (21 April 2020). Enemies of the People?. Bristol University Press. ISBN 9781529204506.

== Personal life ==
Rozenberg is married to journalist Melanie Phillips; the couple have two children. He is Jewish.
