= Ghulam Sarwar (writer) =

Bangladeshi-born writer

- Born: Bengal Presidency, British India
- Citizenship: British
- Education: Govt College of Commerce, University of Dhaka
- Spouse: Feroza Sarwar

Ghulam Sarwar is a Bangladeshi-born British writer on Islam in English and director of the Muslim Educational Trust (MET).

== Biography ==
Sarwar was born in the Bengal Presidency (now Bangladesh), British India. He graduated with honours in commerce from the Government College of Commerce, Chittagong and also received his Master of Business and Management from the University of Dhaka.

Sarwar is director of the Muslim Educational Trust (MET), which the Charity Commission for England and Wales describes as, "An educational charity devoted to the catering for the educational needs of Muslims and their children in the UK".

== Works ==
Ed Husain writes that when he was a juvenile, Sarwar's Islam: Beliefs and Teachings was used in religious education classes in Britain, and that as of 2007 it continued to be used as an introductory text in schools, mosques and Muslim homes there.

His other written works include:

- Islam for Younger People. (1981) Muslim Educational Trust. ISBN 090726140X
- The Children’s Book of Salah. Muslim Educational Trust. ISBN 0907261094
- British Muslims and Schools. Muslim Educational Trust. ISBN 0907261434
- Sex Education: The Muslim Perspective. Muslim Educational Trust. ISBN 0907261418
- Syllabus and Guidelines for Islamic Teaching. Muslim Educational Trust. ISBN 0907261078
- Muslims and Education in the UK. Muslim Educational Trust. ISBN 0907261434

== See also ==
- British Bangladeshi
- List of British Bangladeshis
