= Londonstani =

2006 novel by Gautam Malkani

- Londonstani
- Author: Gautam Malkani
- Language: English
- Genre: Novel
- Publisher: Fourth Estate
- Publication date: 2006
- Publication place: United Kingdom
- Media type: Print (Hardback & Paperback)
- Pages: 342 pages
- ISBN: 978-0-00-723175-1
- OCLC: 156793206

Londonstani is Gautam Malkani's debut novel published in the United Kingdom in 2006. The book's name is derived from the setting of the novel, London, and the story's subject matter, the lives of second and third generation South Asian immigrants. The book was highly promoted, but did not do well commercially.

The novel was a "much-anticipated debut" well before its release, as a result of the book's reception at the 2005 Frankfurt Book Fair and the six-figure advance reportedly paid for the rights to the book by publishing company Fourth Estate. Publication was accompanied by an expensive promotion campaign including a tour of the United States. According to Time magazine, the advance for the book as the first part of a two-book deal was $675,000. Despite the attention paid to the book, sales were relatively weak and by April 2008 only 15,000 copies had been sold. The Guardian reported that people in the publishing industry started talking of the "Londonstani effect"—when a much-hyped novel can't sell as well as was expected.

== Contents ==
The novel's action is set in Hounslow, a London neighbourhood, and its main character is a young man, Jas, who joins a gang of Sikh and Hindu youngsters making a living on the side unlocking stolen cell phones. When they take a phone from the wrong person, Jas and his three friends become engaged in "a shadowy scheme that leads to Terrible Consequences." Besides being pursued by gangsters, Jas also has to deal with cultural problems after he falls in love with a Muslim girl.

== Critical reception ==
Suhayl Saadi and Tim Martin, both writing in The Independent, called the novel "a competent debut by a talented writer" and "a bold and vigorous debut," respectively.

The novel's language is a mixture of different British dialects (including texting abbreviations), which critics such as Tim Martin ("The addictive exuberance of Jas's patter is also a form of literary prestidigitation") seem to approve of. Others are less convinced. Suhayl Saadi (a writer of Pakistani descent), for instance, praises "the powerful, sometimes homoerotic, depiction of violence and sexual frustration" but notes that the "good" people in the novel all tend to speak in Received Pronunciation accents ("Empathy is created for South Asians only if they speak with a British accent") and this linguistic stereotyping leads Saadi to conclude that Londonstani "is a shabby, 21st-century, Orientalism and is not dissimilar from the mentality via which the Middle East is being re-colonised."

The plot, and especially the ending, was praised by some and severely criticized by others. Tim Martin praised the "shattering twist that maintains total narrative cogency while turning the entire book upside down," but Suhayl Saadi calls it "contrived and unconvincing" and complains of a "clunky" plot. James Bridle, on ReadySteadyBook, agrees, in an otherwise positive review: "The less said about the final twist, which smacks of rushed, massive-advance-mediated desperation, the better." Mandy Sayer, writing for the Sydney Morning Herald, praises the novel for exuding a "charming, original energy" but criticizes "the surprise ending and resolution [which] is disappointing, clichéd and trite." Her overall conclusion: "As a contemporary cultural artefact, Londonstani is second to none. As a novel, it is overwritten and undercrafted. I have no doubt it will do very well."

Within two years after its publication, Londonstani became the subject of a full-length academic article: "Escaping the Matrix" by Michael Mitchell studies the book for its perspective on multi-cultural England.

=== Reception outside the UK ===
Critics in the United States were generally positive. Donald Morrison, in Time, praised the novel's language ("The novel is written in an imaginative mix of English, Punjabi, Urdu, profanity, gangsta rap and mobile-phone texting") in an altogether positive article. The New York Times book editors picked the novel as an "Editors' choice" in August 2006. A full-length review in The New York Times was mixed, criticizing its "teenage flaws" and "an embarrassingly sophomoric twist for a denouement"; still, Sophie Harrison praised its "extra-aural overtones."

In the Netherlands, responses were positive and both novel and author received a great deal of coverage. NRC Handelsblad published a lengthy review, which concluded by calling the book an interesting debut by a promising writer. Vrij Nederland published a lengthy interview with the author (he was in the Netherlands promoting the book). VPRO's 3VOOR12 reported on the 2006 edition (named "Londonstani," after Malkani's novel) of "Crossing Border," an annual festival in The Hague which combines music and literature, featured Dutch and British bands (including Panjabi Hit Squad and British Asian Ms Scandalous), and Malkani reading passages from his book. A review on a Hindu website praised the novel for its many deftly handled and relevant plotlines and its linguistic qualities, and saw Malkani's portrayal of "Londonstanis" as relevant to "Hollandistanis" also. Trouw, however, called the book shallow, and Dutch writer Robert Vuijsje called it the worst book of the year.

Londonstani appears to have received little attention in the German or French press, and what attention it got was negative.
