= Melanie Phillips =

English journalist (born 1951)

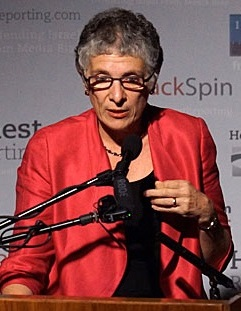
- Phillips in 2014
- Born: 4 June 1951 (age 75); London, England
- Education: St Anne's College, Oxford
- Occupations: Journalist; author; publisher
- Notable credits: The Times and Jewish News Syndicate columnist; Former columnist for The Guardian, The Spectator and the Daily Mail; Author of Londonistan
- Spouse: Joshua Rozenberg
- Children: 2
- Website: melaniephillips.com

Melanie Phillips (born 4 June 1951) is an English public commentator. She began her career writing for The Guardian and New Statesman. She currently writes for The Times, The Jerusalem Post, the Jewish News Syndicate, and The Jewish Chronicle, covering political and social issues from a socially conservative Zionist perspective.

During the 1990s, critics alleged that Phillips became increasingly associated with right-wing politics and the far-right, and her work has been linked by some commentators to the Eurabia conspiracy theory. Phillips and her supporters have disputed these characterisations, describing her views as stemming from consistent concern for social policy and extremism. She has stated: "I haven't changed. I am still fighting for what I perceive to be truth, justice and a concern for the vulnerable." Others, in 2003, pointed to her long career across a range of publications and her receipt of the Orwell Prize as evidence that her views are not easily categorised. Phillips has also described herself, quoting the prominent neoconservative Irving Kristol, as a "liberal who has been mugged by reality".

Phillips has appeared as a panellist on the BBC Radio 4 programme The Moral Maze and BBC One's Question Time. She was awarded the Orwell Prize for Journalism in 1996, while she was writing for The Observer. Her books include the memoir Guardian Angel: My Story, My Britain.

== Early life ==
Melanie Phillips was born in Hammersmith, the daughter of Mabel (née Cohen) and Alfred Phillips. Her family is Jewish, and emigrated to Britain from Poland and Russia. Her grandfather changed his name to "Phillips" as British immigration officials were unable to pronounce his surname. She describes her family as living as outsiders in an impoverished area of London, who "kept their heads down and tried to assimilate by aping the class mannerisms of the English". Her father, Alfred, was a dress salesman, while her mother, Mabel, ran a children's clothes shop, and both were committed Labour voters. She has stated that her father was "gentle, kind, and innocent", an "overgrown child", and that "as my other parent, he just wasn't there", which taught her "how the absence of proper fathering could screw up a child for life". She was educated at Putney High School, a girls' fee-paying independent school in Putney, London. Later, she read English at St Anne's College, Oxford.

== Journalism career ==
Phillips trained as a journalist on the Evening Echo, a local newspaper in Hemel Hempstead. After winning the Young Journalist of the Year award in 1976, she spent a short period at New Society magazine.

She joined The Guardian newspaper in 1977, becoming its social services correspondent and social policy leader writer. In 1982, she defended the Labour Party at the time of the split with the Social Democratic Party. In 1984, she became the paper's news editor, and was reported to have fainted on her first day. Her opinion column began in 1987. While working for The Guardian, Phillips was persuaded by playwright and theatre director Julia Pascal to write a play called Traitors, which Pascal then directed. It was performed at the Drill Hall from January 1986. The play was set at the time of the 1982 Lebanon War, and centred on the moral dilemmas of a Jewish journalist who, as political editor of a liberal magazine, has to decide whether to veto an article written in anti-Semitic tones, and also whether she is right to publish a leaked document about the Falklands War. The play was reviewed by John Peter in The Sunday Times as "a play of blistering intelligence and fearless moral questioning", although he considered it bordering on implausible. According to Phillips, writing in December 2017, it was the only positive review the play received.

Phillips left The Guardian in 1993, stating that her relationship with the paper and its readers had become "like a really horrific family argument". She took her opinion column to The Guardian's sister-paper The Observer, then to The Sunday Times in 1998, before beginning her association with the tabloid Daily Mail in 2001. She also wrote for The Jewish Chronicle, The Jerusalem Post, and other periodicals.

In November 2010, The Spectator and Phillips apologised, and agreed to pay substantial compensation and legal costs to a prominent British Muslim whom they falsely accused of anti-Semitism. The following year, Phillips resigned from the magazine after it apologised, and paid compensation, for another of her pieces which, it said, contained an allegation that was "completely false"; the New Statesman reported The Spectator paid compensation and costs of "tens of thousands of pounds".

Since 2003, she has written a blog, once hosted by The Spectator, but following her resignation from the magazine in June 2011, it is hosted on her website. In September 2013, it emerged that her Mail column was to end, although, according to Phillips, the newspaper wanted her to continue to write features and other articles for it.

In 2013, she launched an e-book publishing company called emBooks, to promote her book, together with several others, and self-promotional merchandise to the US market. She currently writes for The Times.

She had a weekly radio show on Voice of Israel, an internet radio station, is a regular panellist on BBC Radio's The Moral Maze, and appears frequently on the BBC's TV political shows, Question Time and The Daily Politics.

== Views and opinions ==
The BBC has said that Phillips "is regarded as one of the [British] media's leading right-wing voices", and a "controversial" columnist. Nick Cohen wrote in 2011 that she has become vilified by The Guardian. Phillips herself stated in 2006, during an interview with Jackie Ashley for the newspaper, that it often misrepresents her opinions.

=== International issues ===
==== Irish independence ====
Phillips expressed opposition to Irish independence, declaring on 7 March 2017 in her column in The Times, that the "most troublesome bits" of the UK are "showing signs of disuniting". For her, Scottish nationalism and Irish republicanism are cultural phenomena "rooted in romanticism and myth", while Englishness "came to stand proxy for all the communities of the British Isles". In particular, she wrote, "Ireland itself has a tenuous claim to nationhood" because the Irish Free State was only established in 1922. She denounced "attempts at secession by tribes" in Northern Ireland. The Irish Times said that the piece had met with objections from both unionists and republicans. The Irish ambassador to the United Kingdom, Daniel Mulhall, said on Twitter that the country's sovereignty is "based on strong sense of identity, distinctive culture & shared values and interests", and rejected her claim.

She is ambivalent about the Northern Ireland peace process, stating that, on the one hand, it has strengthened the Union with Great Britain, and saved lives, but that, on the other hand, it has rewarded terrorism, "undermined the rule of law", and exchanged bombs for "paramilitary, mafia-style control of some areas of Northern Ireland". In June 2014, in the context of Britain's first entirely secret trial for centuries, Phillips said that such legal proceedings are justifiable in certain circumstances.

==== Islam ====
Phillips was criticised for an article she wrote in The Jewish Chronicle which suggested that "the taunt of Islamophobia is used to silence any criticism of the Islamic world, including Islamic extremism", and "facilitates" anti-Semitism. The newspaper's editor, while not offering regret for publishing the article, did acknowledge that the article had been divisive, and apologised to readers who had been angered or upset by the piece. Simon Kuper, writing in the Financial Times, accused her in 2011 of being an advocate for the Eurabia conspiracy theory.

==== Iran ====
Phillips is a staunch critic of the Islamic Republic of Iran, and has written and spoken frequently about the threat she perceives it to be, particularly if it were to obtain nuclear weapons. She has drawn criticism for her hard-line approach from commentators at The Guardian.

==== Israel ====
Phillips's criticisms of liberal Jews who disagree with her positions on Israel have been mocked or condemned by writers such as Alan Dershowitz, Rabbi David Goldberg, and Jonathan Freedland, who criticised Phillips's labelling of Independent Jewish Voices, a group of liberal Jews, as "Jews For Genocide". Freedland wrote in The Jewish Chronicle: "Now, as it happens, I have multiple criticisms of IJV ... but even their most trenchant opponents must surely blanch at the notion that these critics of Israel and of Anglo-Jewish officialdom are somehow in favour of genocide—literally, eager to see the murder and eradication of the Jewish people ... it is an absurdity, one that drains the word 'genocide' of any meaning".

==== Gaza and Palestine ====
In March 2024, Phillips said on BBC Question Time that it was "completely untrue" that Gazans were being denied access to food and humanitarian aid, that photos and videos on YouTube showed stocked food markets in Gaza, and that supplies had been stopped from going into Gaza because they had been "stolen by Hamas". She also said that the UN was "compromised" by links to Hamas, and that a ceasefire would lead to more deaths. The i Paper fact-checked these claims, and found no evidence to support them.

In October 2025, at a conference called "Rage Against the Hate" organised by Shurat HaDin at the Museum of Jewish Heritage in New York City, in her speech, Phillips denied the existence of Palestinians and stated that only Jewish people have any "entitlement" to Palestine. She also stated that the West is facing a "death cult" in the "forces of Islam".

==== United States ====
Early in the presidency of Barack Obama, Phillips accused him of "adopting the agenda of the Islamist", and of being "firmly in the Islamists' camp". Shortly after Obama's re-election for a second term, Phillips said that, "Four years ago, America put into the White House a sulky narcissist with an unbroken history of involvement in thuggish, corrupt, far-left, black power, Jew-bashing, west-hating politics". She warned that Obama would lead America into a "terrifying darkness". The Independent termed it "rather odd", and an "angry rant".

Phillips wrote in defence of president-elect Donald Trump on 14 November 2016: "Believing the smears they have created, the Trumpophobes then smear the public for voting for the man they have thus smeared. This, of course, is precisely why millions voted against the liberal establishment and for Trump, as well as for Brexit, in the first place".

A year later, she criticised Trump for retweeting videos from Britain First's leader Jayda Fransen, calling them "beyond stupid, reckless and reprehensible". She added that "Trump has given an enormous boost to a group that should be treated as totally beyond the pale. Although campaigning against Islamic extremism, intolerance and religious fascism is not just acceptable but necessary, some groups which do so are totally unacceptable because they themselves promote extremism, intolerance or fascism. Britain First is squarely in that category."

=== Climate change ===
Phillips opposes the scientific consensus on climate change. In 2013, she argued that "there is no evidence for global warming... the seas are not rising any more than is in any way out of the ordinary, the ice is not decreasing, it is increasing, the polar bears are increasing in number, and the temperature is going down, not up". She believes that, "The warming that was observed between 1978–1998 has stopped and global temperatures have plateaued". She has further argued that "Man-made global warming theory has been propped up by studies that many scientists have dismissed as methodologically flawed, ideologically bent or even fraudulent". She has written that, "The claim that CO_{2} emissions are acidifying the oceans is a favourite of climate-change alarmists", and that "claims that coral reefs are doomed by ocean acidification are overplayed".

Phillips' published views on these topics have been rebutted by scientists and academics, including John Krebs and Nicholas Stern.

=== MMR vaccine ===
Phillips supported Andrew Wakefield, whose fraudulent work triggered controversy about the MMR vaccine and led to his being struck off the medical register. Through numerous articles in the Daily Mail and The Spectator, Phillips championed Wakefield's claims, while casting doubt on their rebuttal by scientists, doctors, and politicians. Her attacks on MMR attracted criticism from scientists and science writers. Phillips continued to support Wakefield after his research methods and motives began to attract serious scrutiny and criticism: "While Mr Wakefield is being subjected to a witch-hunt, and while the parents of the affected children are scandalously denied legal aid to pursue the court case which may well have finally brought to light the truth about MMR, those powerful people in the medical establishment are continuing to misrepresent the evidence."

In May 2010, Andrew Wakefield was struck off the Medical Register for "serious professional misconduct", and is currently barred from practising medicine in the UK. Phillips's support of Wakefield's "findings", and her campaign against the MMR vaccine, has been both widely noted, and credited for significantly undermining public trust in vaccines.

=== Domestic issues ===
==== Immigration ====
In a criticism of Labour Party policy in 2009, Phillips characterised immigration as "a politically motivated attempt by ministers to transform the fundamental make-up and identity of this country", an opinion that was favourably cited by mass murderer Anders Breivik in his manifesto before the 2011 Norway attacks.

==== Party politics ====
She has argued that the Conservative Party lost its way after the retirement of Margaret Thatcher. She also said in 2013 that the UK Independence Party was prepared to embody "truly conservative attitudes" and had attracted a sizeable protest vote, despite its "unsustainable spending policies". She has also offered tempered praise of Tony Blair's attitude to Islamic extremism, and she supported his policy of entering the Iraq War.

==== Education ====
In All Must Have Prizes, published in 1996, Phillips offered a critique of the British education system, saying that an egalitarian and non-competitive ethos (progressivism; multicultural education) had led to a catastrophic fall in standards. She criticised John Dewey's "disastrous influence". One academic critic said that "Phillips gets Dewey quite wrong", for example in claims that Dewey promoted ahistoric and cultureless education. Phillips criticised one academic paper — on primary-school children's constructions of British identity. Its authors responded with a follow-up study, showing that young adolescents, in common with their counterparts in primary schools, adopt a pluralist viewpoint, with virtually no nationalist or racist comments.

==== Culture ====
Phillips became a "scathing critic of modern Britain" which she described in 2006 as "a debauched and disorderly culture of instant gratification, with disintegrating families, feral children and violence, squalor and vulgarity on the streets".

==== Drugs ====
In 2008, Ruth Runciman, chair of the UK Drugs Policy Commission, called "allegations" Phillips made that the commission was "intent on bringing about the legalisation of drugs" "an absolute travesty and a wilful misrepresentation".

==== Gay rights ====
She opposed the introduction of civil partnerships for gay couples in the UK, and has said that what she calls "the traditional family [...] has been relentlessly attacked by an alliance of feminists, gay rights activists, divorce lawyers and cultural Marxists who grasped that this was the surest way to destroy Western society". She has said that giving IVF fertility treatment to lesbian women would "help destroy our understanding of human identity". She said the UK government was "brainwashing" children by including references to gay people in lessons in schools. She received the "Bigot of the Year" award from gay equality organisation Stonewall in 2011.

== Personal life ==
Phillips is married to Joshua Rozenberg, former legal affairs editor for the BBC. The couple have two children.

== Published works ==
- The Divided House: Women at Westminster, Sidgwick and Jackson, 1980, ISBN 0-283-98547-X.
- Doctors' Dilemmas: Medical Ethics and Contemporary Science by Melanie Phillips & John Dawson, Harvester Press, 1985, ISBN 0-7108-0983-2.
- All Must Have Prizes, Warner, 1998, ISBN 0-7515-2274-0.
- The Sex-Change Society: Feminised Britain and the Neutered Male, Social Market Foundation, 1999, ISBN 1-874097-64-X.
- America's Social Revolution, Civitas: Institute for the Study of Civil Society, 2001, ISBN 1-903386-15-2.
- The Ascent of Woman: A History of the Suffragette Movement and the Ideas Behind it, Little, Brown, 2003, ISBN 0-316-72533-1.
- Londonistan: How Britain Is Creating a Terror State Within, Gibson Square Books Ltd, 2006, ISBN 1-903933-76-5.
- The World Turned Upside Down: The Global Battle Over God, Truth and Power, New York, Encounter Books, 2010, ISBN 978-1-59403-375-9.
- Guardian Angel: My Story, My Britain, emBooks, 1 edition (1 May 2013), ASIN B00CMA0KP6
- The Legacy (novel), Bombardier Books, 2018 ISBN 978-1-68261-566-9
- Guardian Angel: My Journey from Leftism to Sanity, Bombardier Books, 2018.
- The Builder's Stone. How Christians & Jews Built the West, Wicked Son, 2025, ISBN 979-8895650349.
- Fighting the Hate: A Handbook for Jews Under Siege, Wicked Son, 2026, ISBN 979-8895656303.
