= Ruqaiyyah Waris Maqsood =

British writer

Ruqaiyyah Waris Maqsood, (born Rosalyn Rushbrook in 1942, later Rosalyn Kendrick) is a British author of some forty books on Islam and other subjects.

== Biography ==
Maqsood was born in London in 1942. She graduated from the University of Hull in 1963 with an honours degree in Christian Theology, and gained a DipEd in 1964. Maqsood was a convert to Islam from Christianity in 1986. She taught religious studies in the United Kingdom for more than thirty years. Prior to her retirement in 1996, she had been head of religious education at a Hull secondary school.

She has written more than forty books on religious topics. Under her first married name Rosalyn Kendrick, she wrote several books about aspects of Christian theology. From 1992, she published a large body of writing to introduce Islam to English speaking people. Her book for children, Islamic Mosques (2005), includes information about mosques and how to pronounce Islamic terms. Need to Know?: Islam (2008) was considered a contemporary "Tablīgh" by Insights.

== Bibliography ==
Title	Year	Publisher	Notes
Does God Have a Body? and Other Questions	1977	SCM Press, London	as Rosalyn Kendrick
Jesus of Nazareth: Plays for the Classroom	1979	Edward Arnold, London	as Rosalyn Kendrick
Setting the Foundations: A Guide to the Study of the Life and Teaching of Jesus Christ as Presented in the First Three Gospels	1983	Hulton Educational, Amersham	as Rosalyn Kendrick
The Trouble with God: An Introduction to the Philosophy of Religion	1983	H.E. Walter, Worthing, West Sussex	
In the Steps of Jesus: Insights into the Life and World of Christ	1985	Hulton Educational, Amersham	as Rosalyn Kendrick
Examining Religions: Moral Issues in Six Religions, ed. W. Owen Cole	1991	Heinemann, Oxford	as Rosalyn Kendrick
The Separated Ones: Jesus, the Pharisees, and Islam	1991	SCM Press, London	
Where Did I Go Wrong?	1992	St. Paul Publications	as Rosalyn Rushbrook
Sacred Texts: The Qur'an	1993	Heinemann, Oxford	
Petra: A Traveller's Guide	1994	Garnet Press, Reading	
For Heaven's Sake	1994	Ta-Ha Publications, London	
Thinking about God	1994	American Trust Publications, Plainfield, Indiana	
Living with Teenagers: A Guide for Muslim Parents	1995	Ta-Ha Publications, London	
The Story at I'd	1995	Heinemann Educational, Oxford	
Life Beyond Death: Christian Response to Bereavement	1995	Canterbury Press, Norwich	as Rosalyn Kendrick
The Muslim Marriage Guide	1995	Quilliam Press, London	
Islam: A Dictionary	1996		
The Beautiful Commands of Allah	1997	Goodword Books, New Delhi	
Bride of the Nile	1998	Wolfhound Press	YA fiction
The Muslim Prayer Encyclopaedia: A Complete Guide to Prayers as Taught by the Prophet Muhammad	1998	Goodword Books, New Delhi	
After Death, Life: Thoughts to Alleviate the Grief of All Muslims Facing Death and Bereavement	1998	Goodword Books, New Delhi	
Living Islam: Treading the Path of the Ideal	1998	Goodword Books, New Delhi	
A Basic Dictionary of Islam	1998	Goodword Books, New Delhi	
The Beautiful Promises of Allah	1998	Goodword Books, New Delhi	
The Beloved Prophet	1999	Able Publishing, Knebworth	
The Problem of Evil	2000	Adam Publishers, Delhi	
The Sign of the Gnat	2000	Adam Publishers, Delhi	
The Mysteries of Jesus: A Muslim Study of the Origins and Doctrines of the Christian Church	2000	Sakina Books, Oxford	
GCSE Islam – the Do-it-Yourself Guide	2001	Goodword Books, New Delhi; IPCI, Birmingham	
What Every Christian Should Know about Islam	2002	Islamic Foundation, Leicester	
Islamic Mosques	2005	Raintree, Oxford	
Teach Yourself Islam	1994; 3rd ed. 2006	Hodder and Stoughton, London	
Islam – An Introduction: Teach Yourself	2010		
Islam Made Simple: Flash	2011		
Islam (Collins Need to Know?)	2012	HarperCollins, London	
