= National Muslim Education Council =

Islamic organization based in the United Kingdom

The National Muslim Education Council is a British charity founded in 1978 by the Union of Muslim Organisations of UK. Its first chairman was Safa Khulusi.

Its mission is to "coordinate educational activities with other education charities. To help in training, education of Muslim adults and children. To promote religious activities and participate in inter-faith education boards."

The council publishes documents and papers on religious education. In 1988, it lobbied the government to change the UK's Education Reform Act which required "broadly Christian" acts of worship in schools. They wanted the wording to be changed to "the worship of the one supreme God". They also wanted the standing Advisory Committees on Religious Education to have more input from Muslims. In 2001 Syed Aziz Pasha, secretary of the council, defended Muslim religious teaching in the light of a report that excessive study of the Quran was leading to poor educational performance by Pakistani children in the UK.
